= 2015 in paleontology =

Paleontology or palaeontology is the study of prehistoric life forms on Earth through the examination of plant and animal fossils. This includes the study of body fossils, tracks (ichnites), burrows, cast-off parts, fossilised feces (coprolites), palynomorphs and chemical residues. Because humans have encountered fossils for millennia, paleontology has a long history both before and after becoming formalized as a science. This article records significant discoveries and events related to paleontology that occurred or were published in the year 2015.

== Cnidarians ==
Name	Novelty	Status	Authors	Age	Unit	Location	Notes	Images
Acropora darrellae	Sp. nov	Valid	Santodomingo, Wallace & Johnson	Miocene		Indonesia	A staghorn coral, a species of Acropora.	
Acropora elenae	Sp. nov	Valid	Santodomingo, Wallace & Johnson	Miocene		Indonesia	A staghorn coral, a species of Acropora.	
Acropora emanuelae	Sp. nov	Valid	Santodomingo, Wallace & Johnson	Miocene		Indonesia	A staghorn coral, a species of Acropora.	
Acropora hasibuani	Sp. nov	Valid	Santodomingo, Wallace & Johnson	Miocene		Indonesia	A staghorn coral, a species of Acropora.	
Acropora laurae	Sp. nov	Valid	Santodomingo, Wallace & Johnson	Late Oligocene		Malaysia	A staghorn coral, a species of Acropora.	
Acropora renemai	Sp. nov	Valid	Santodomingo, Wallace & Johnson	Miocene		Indonesia	A staghorn coral, a species of Acropora.	
Actinaraea michoacanensis	Sp. nov	Valid	Filkorn & Pantoja-Alor	Early Cretaceous (early Aptian)	Cumburindio Formation	Mexico	A stony coral belonging to the family Actinacididae, a species of Actinaraea.	
Actinastrea chumbitaroensis	Sp. nov	Valid	Filkorn & Pantoja-Alor	Early Cretaceous (late Albian)	Mal Paso Formation	Mexico	A stony coral belonging to the family Actinastraeidae, a species of Actinastrea.	
Australastraea	Gen. et comb. et 2 sp. nov	Valid	Denayer & Webb	Carboniferous (Mississippian)		Australia	A rugose coral belonging to the group Stauriida and the family Lithostrotionidae. A new genus for "Lithostrotion" columnare Etheridge (1900); genus also contains "Orionastraea" columellaris Pickett (1966), "Lithostrotion" parvicolumnare Pickett (1966), "Lithostrotion" wilkinsoni Pickett (1966) and "Orionastraea" flemingi Webb (1990), as well as new species Australastraea arcifera and Australastraea carinata.	
Axisvacuus tenerus	Sp. nov	Valid	Fedorowski	Carboniferous (early Serpukhovian)		Poland	A rugose coral belonging to the group Stauriida and the family Antiphyllidae, a species of Axisvacuus.	
Birkenmajerites	Gen. et sp. nov	Valid	Fedorowski	Carboniferous (early Serpukhovian)		Poland	A rugose coral belonging to the group Stauriida and the family Ostravaiaidae. The type species is Birkenmajerites primus.	
Cairnsipsammia	Gen. et sp. nov	Valid	Baron-Szabo	Early Cretaceous (late Barremian–early Aptian)	Schrattenkalk Formation	Austria	A stony coral belonging to the family Dendrophylliidae. The type species is C. merbeleri.	
Chekhovichia	Nom. nov	Valid	Doweld	Late Silurian		Kyrgyzstan; Russia; Uzbekistan	An anthozoan belonging to the group Heliolitoidea and the family Innaporidae; a replacement name for Rotalites Leleshus (1970).	
Chelmia	Gen. et sp. nov	Valid	Fedorowski	Carboniferous (early Serpukhovian)		Poland	A rugose coral belonging to the group Stauriida. The type species is Chelmia radiata.	
Cionodendron smithi	Sp. nov	Valid	Denayer & Webb	Carboniferous (early Viséan)		Australia	A rugose coral belonging to the group Stauriida and the family Lithostrotionidae; a species of Cionodendron.	
Craspedophyllia japonica	Sp. nov	Valid	Stanley & Onoue	Late Triassic		Japan	A stony coral belonging to the family Reimaniphylliidae, a species of Craspedophyllia.	
Crassialveolites niigataensis	Sp. nov	Valid	Niko, Ibaraki & Tazawa	Devonian		Japan	A tabulate coral belonging to the family Alveolitidae.	
Crateroseris stefani	Sp. nov	Valid	Eliášová	Late Jurassic (Tithonian)	Štramberk Limestone	Czech Republic	A stony coral belonging to the family Synastraeidae, a species of Crateroseris.	
Cryptosepta	Gen. et sp. nov	Valid	Gretz, Lathuilière & Martini	Early Jurassic (Hettangian)		France	A zardinophyllid coral. The type species is Cryptosepta nuda.	
Dendrophyllia okamotoi	Sp. nov	Valid	Niko, Suzuki & Taguchi	Miocene	Katsuta Group	Japan	A species of Dendrophyllia.	
Echinophyllia sassellensis	Sp. nov	Valid	Budd & Bosellini	Oligocene		Italy		
Eocolumastrea	Gen. et comb. nov	Valid	Löser & Zell	Cretaceous		Romania	A stony coral belonging to the group Faviina and the family Columastraeidae. A new genus for "Columnocoenia" ksiazkiewiczi bucovinensis Morycowa (1971) (raised to the rank of a separate species Eocolumastrea bucovinensis)	
Eokoninckocarinia gemmina	Sp. nov	Valid	Denayer	Carboniferous (Mississippian)	Yaricak Formation	Turkey	A rugose coral belonging to the group Stauriida, possibly a member of the family Koninckocariniidae.	
Goniophyllum osloense	Sp. nov	Valid	Johannessen in Wright	Silurian (late Telychian)	Vik Formation	Norway	An operculate coral, a species of Goniophyllum.	
Guembelastraea kanmerae	Sp. nov	Valid	Stanley & Onoue	Late Triassic		Japan	A stony coral belonging to the family Guembelastraeidae, a species of Guembelastraea.	
Halucinophyllia	Gen. et sp. nov	Valid	Eliášová	Late Jurassic (Tithonian)	Štramberk Limestone	Czech Republic	A stony coral belonging to the family Latomeandridae. The type species is Halucinophyllia subridens.	
Heteropistophyllum carchensis	Sp. nov	Valid	Löser, Arias & Vilas	Early Cretaceous (Aptian and Albian)		Mexico; Spain	A stony coral belonging to the family Elasmocoeniidae, a species of Heteropistophyllum.	
Isopora matahari	Sp. nov	Valid	Santodomingo, Wallace & Johnson	Miocene		Indonesia	A staghorn coral, a species of Isopora.	
Latiphyllia mexicana	Sp. nov	Valid	Filkorn & Pantoja-Alor	Early Cretaceous (late Albian)	Mal Paso Formation	Mexico	A stony coral belonging to the family Montlivaltiidae, a species of Latiphyllia.	
Leleshusia	Nom. nov	Valid	Doweld	Late Ordovician		China; Kazakhstan; Russia; Tajikistan; Uzbekistan	An anthozoan belonging to the group Heliolitoidea; a replacement name for Granulina Leleshus (1975).	
Margarosmilia mizukamia	Sp. nov	Valid	Stanley & Onoue	Late Triassic		Japan	A stony coral belonging to the family Margarophylliidae, a species of Margarosmilia.	
Mycetophyllopsis azteca	Sp. nov	Valid	Filkorn & Pantoja-Alor	Early Cretaceous (late Albian)	Mal Paso Formation	Mexico	A stony coral belonging to the family Montlivaltiidae, a species of Mycetophyllopsis.	
Munusculum	Gen. et sp. nov	Valid	Eliášová	Late Jurassic (Tithonian)	Štramberk Limestone	Czech Republic	A stony coral belonging to the suborder Microsolenina. The type species is Munusculum martinaseki.	
Nervophyllum lukoviensis	Sp. nov	Valid	Fedorowski	Carboniferous (early Serpukhovian)		Poland	A rugose coral belonging to the group Stauriida and the family Aulophyllidae, a species of Nervophyllum.	
Nudacolumastrea	Gen. et sp. nov	Valid	Löser & Zell	Cretaceous		Spain	A stony coral belonging to the group Faviina and the family Columastraeidae. The type species is Nudacolumastrea stefani.	
Occulogermen	Gen. et sp. nov	Valid	Fedorowski	Carboniferous (early Serpukhovian)		Poland	A rugose coral belonging to the group Stauriida and the family Lithostrotionidae. The type species is Occulogermen luciae.	
Orbignygyra? incognita	Sp. nov	Valid	Filkorn & Pantoja-Alor	Early Cretaceous (late Albian)	Mal Paso Formation	Mexico	A stony coral belonging to the family Dendrogyridae, possibly a species of Orbignygyra.	
Ovalastrea malpaso	Sp. nov	Valid	Filkorn & Pantoja-Alor	Early Cretaceous (late Albian)	Mal Paso Formation	Mexico	A stony coral belonging to the family Latomeandridae, a species of Ovalastrea.	
Paraclausastrea vorarlbergensis	Sp. nov	Valid	Baron-Szabo	Early Cretaceous (late Barremian-early Aptian)	Schrattenkalk Formation	Austria	A montlivaltiid stony coral, a species of Paraclausastrea.	
Paracycloseris effrenatus	Sp. nov	Valid	Filkorn & Pantoja-Alor	Early Cretaceous (late Albian)	Mal Paso Formation	Mexico	A stony coral belonging to the family Cunnolitidae, a species of Paracycloseris.	
Paraleptoria	Gen. et comb. nov	Valid	Budd & Bosellini	Eocene (Lutetian) to Oligocene (Rupelian)		Italy	A new genus for "Meandrina" polygonalis Catullo (1856); genus also includes "Diploria" flexuosissima d'Achiardi (1868).	
Parascolymia bracherti	Sp. nov	Valid	Reuter in Reuter, Wiedl & Piller	Miocene (Langhian‒early Serravallian)	Leitha Limestone	Austria	A stony coral belonging to the family Lobophylliidae, a species of Parascolymia.	
Pickettodendron	Gen. et comb. et sp. nov	Valid	Denayer & Webb	Carboniferous (Tournaisian)		Australia	A rugose coral belonging to the group Stauriida and the family Lithostrotionidae. A new genus for "Lithostrotion" williamsi Pickett (1966); genus also contains "Schoenophyllum" dalmaensis Webb (1990), as well as new species Pickettodendron nudum.	
Preverastraea coatlicueae	Sp. nov	Valid	Filkorn & Pantoja-Alor	Early Cretaceous (late Albian)	Mal Paso Formation	Mexico	A stony coral belonging to the family Rhipidogyridae, a species of Preverastraea.	
Preverastraea tociae	Sp. nov	Valid	Filkorn & Pantoja-Alor	Early Cretaceous (late Albian)	Mal Paso Formation	Mexico	A stony coral belonging to the family Rhipidogyridae, a species of Preverastraea.	
Pseudoroemeripora sugimurai	Sp. nov	Valid	Niko, Fujikawa & Haikawa	Permian	Akiyoshi Limestone Group	Japan	A tabulate coral.	
Retiophyllia tosaensis	Sp. nov	Valid	Stanley & Onoue	Late Triassic		Japan	A stony coral belonging to the family Reimaniphylliidae, a species of Retiophyllia.	
Rotiphyllum plumeum	Sp. nov	Valid	Fedorowski	Carboniferous (early Serpukhovian)		Poland	A rugose coral belonging to the group Stauriida and the family Antiphyllidae, a species of Rotiphyllum.	
Sakalavastraea perturbata	Sp. nov	Valid	Lösser & Sklenář	Late Cretaceous (late Cenomanian)	Peruc-Korycany Formation	Czech Republic	A stony coral belonging to the group Faviina.	
Saltocyathus cumburindioensis	Sp. nov	Valid	Filkorn & Pantoja-Alor	Early Cretaceous (early Aptian)	Cumburindio Formation	Mexico	A stony coral. Originally assigned to the family Rhipidogyridae and to the genus Saltocyathus, but subsequently transferred to the family Rayasmiliidae and to the genus Rayasmilia.	
Sclerangia	Gen. et sp. nov	Valid	Baron-Szabo & Cairns	Miocene	Chipola Formation	United States	A rhizangiid stony coral. The type species is Sclerangia floridana.	
?Sochkineophyllum symmetricum	Sp. nov	Valid	Fedorowski	Carboniferous (early Serpukhovian)		Poland	A rugose coral belonging to the group Stauriida and the family Polycoeliidae, possibly a species of Sochkineophyllum.	
Sylviella	Gen. et comb. et 4 sp. nov	Valid	Eliášová	Late Jurassic (Tithonian)	Štramberk Limestone	Czech Republic	A stony coral belonging to the suborder Caryophylliina. The type species is "Haplaraea" columnaris Ogilvie (1897); genus also contains new species Sylviella exquisita, Sylviella multisepta, Sylviella noveni and Sylviella benjamin.	
Sylviellopsis	Gen. et sp. nov	Valid	Eliášová	Late Jurassic (Tithonian)	Štramberk Limestone	Czech Republic	A stony coral belonging to the suborder Caryophylliina. The type species is Sylviellopsis erici.	
Tegocoenia	Gen. et comb. nov	Valid	Eliášová	Late Jurassic (Tithonian)	Štramberk Limestone	Czech Republic	A stony coral belonging to the family Placophylliidae. The type species is "Diplocoenia" jasenica Frajová (1960).	
Thalamocaeniopsis mexicanensis	Sp. nov	Valid	Filkorn & Pantoja-Alor	Early Cretaceous (late Albian)	Mal Paso Formation	Mexico	A stony coral belonging to the family Thamnasteriidae, a species of Thalamocaeniopsis.	
Thamnarea hornosensis	Sp. nov	Valid	Filkorn & Pantoja-Alor	Early Cretaceous (early Aptian)	Cumburindio Formation	Mexico	A stony coral belonging to the family Actinacididae, a species of Thamnarea.	
Thamnasteria tonantzinae	Sp. nov	Valid	Filkorn & Pantoja-Alor	Early Cretaceous (late Albian)	Mal Paso Formation	Mexico	A stony coral belonging to the family Thamnasteriidae, a species of Thamnasteria.	
Thamnasteriamorpha okudai	Sp. nov	Valid	Stanley & Onoue	Late Triassic		Japan	A stony coral belonging to the family Tropiastraeidae, a species of Thamnasteriamorpha.	
Thecosmilia guerreroensis	Sp. nov	Valid	Filkorn & Pantoja-Alor	Early Cretaceous (late Albian)	Mal Paso Formation	Mexico	A stony coral belonging to the family Montlivaltiidae, a species of Thecosmilia.	
Variabilifavia ausuganensis	Sp. nov	Valid	Budd & Bosellini	Oligocene (late Rupelian–early Chattian)		Italy		
Yakunopora mabutii	Sp. nov	Valid	Niko	Permian (Wordian)	Iwaizaki Limestone	Japan	A tabulate coral belonging to the group Favositida and the family Pachyporidae.	
Zaphrentites rotiphylloides	Sp. nov	Valid	Fedorowski	Carboniferous (early Serpukhovian)		Poland	A rugose coral belonging to the group Stauriida and the family Stereophrentidae, a species of Zaphrentites.	
Zaphriphyllum daleki	Sp. nov	Valid	Denayer	Carboniferous (late Tournaisian)	Yılanlı Formation	Turkey	A rugose coral belonging to the family Ekvasophyllidae, a species of Zaphriphyllum.	
Zaphrufimia anceps	Sp. nov	Valid	Fedorowski	Carboniferous (early Serpukhovian)		Poland	A rugose coral belonging to the group Stauriida and the family Stereophrentidae, a species of Zaphrufimia.	

== Brachiopods ==
Name	Novelty	Status	Authors	Age	Unit	Location	Notes	Images
Alaskothyris	Gen. et sp. nov	Valid	Blodgett, Baranov & Santucci	Devonian (Givetian)		United States	A stringocephalid terebratulid brachiopod. The type species is Alaskothyris frosti.	
Albasphe	Gen. et sp. nov	Valid	Halamski et al.	Middle Triassic (Ladinian)		Croatia	A member of Terebratulida. The type species is Albasphe albertimagni.	
Alexenia? delepinei	Sp. nov	Valid	Chacón & Winkler Prins	Carboniferous (Pennsylvanian)		Spain	A member of Productidae, possibly a species of Alexenia.	
Ambikella bundellaensis	Sp. nov	Valid	Waterhouse	Permian (Asselian)	Bundella Formation	Australia	A member of Spiriferida belonging to the family Ingelarellidae.	
Amictocracens? brocki	Sp. nov	Valid	Popov et al.	Cambrian	Parahio Formation	India	A member of Acrotretida belonging to the family Acrotretidae, possibly a species of Amictocracens.	
Anidanthia aplini	Sp. nov	Valid	Waterhouse & Balfe	Permian (Changhsingian)	South Curra Limestone	Australia	A member of Productida belonging to the superfamily Paucispiniferoidea and the family Anidanthidae.	
Aphelotreta khemangarensis	Sp. nov	Valid	Popov et al.	Cambrian	Parahio Formation	India	A member of Acrotretida belonging to the family Acrotretidae, a species of Aphelotreta.	
Auriculispina kanmerai	Sp. nov	Valid	Tazawa & Shintani	Permian (Sakmarian)	Sakamotozawa Formation	Japan	A member of Productida belonging to the family Kansuellidae.	
Betaneospirifer gigoomganensis	Sp. nov	Valid	Waterhouse	Permian (Changhsingian)	Gigoomgan Limestone	Australia	A member of Spiriferida belonging to the family Georginakingiidae. Originally described as a species of Betaneospirifer, subsequently transferred to the genus Neilotreta.	
Bifida rara	Sp. nov	Valid	Baranov	Devonian (Emsian)		Russia	A member of Atrypidae, a species of Bifida.	
Bockelia canalis	Sp. nov	Valid	Benedetto	Ordovician (Darriwilian)	Los Azules Formation	Argentina	A member of Strophomenida belonging to the superfamily Plectambonitoidea and the family Taffidae; a species of Bockelia.	
Bookeria	Gen. et 2 sp. et comb. nov	Valid	Waterhouse	Permian	Tiverton Formation	Australia	A member of Productida belonging to the superfamily Proboscidelloidea and the family Paucispinauriidae. The type species is B. sparsispinosa; genus also includes new species B. drysdalei, as well as "Terrakea" pollex Hill (1950) and "Paucispinauria" geniculata Waterhouse (1986).	
Briggsia	Gen. et comb. nov	Junior homonym	Waterhouse	Permian (possibly Asselian)		Australia	A member of Productida belonging to the superfamily Proboscidelloidea and the family Auriculispinidae. The type species is "Bandoproductus" hastingsensis Briggs (1998); genus also includes "Bandoproductus" youdalensis Briggs (1998). The generic name is preoccupied by Briggsia Craig & Randall (2009).	
Castrillonia	Gen. et sp. nov	Valid	García-Alcalde	Devonian		Spain	A member of Orthida belonging to the family Rhipidomellidae. The type species is C. vivaldiana.	
Chilcorthis	Gen. et sp. nov	Valid	Benedetto	Ordovician (Darriwilian)	Los Azules Formation	Argentina	A member of Orthida belonging to the superfamily Plectorthoidea. The type species is Chilcorthis huarpe.	
Chonetinetes elongatus	Sp. nov	Valid	Afanasjeva, Jun-ichi & Tomohiko	Permian		Japan	A member of Chonetida belonging to the family Rugosochonetidae, a species of Chonetinetes.	
Chopinia	Gen. et sp. nov	Junior homonym	García-Alcalde & Herrera	Devonian (late Lochkovian or the early Pragian)		Spain	A member of Athyridida belonging to the family Athyrididae. The type species is C. petercarlsi. The generic name is preoccupied by Chopinia d'Abrera (2001).	
Chynithele intermedia	Sp. nov	Valid	Mergl & Jiménez-Sánchez	Devonian (late Emsian)	Daleje-Třebotov Formation	Czech Republic	A member of Discinidae, a species of Chynithele.	
Copperella	Gen. et sp. nov	Valid	Baranov	Devonian (Emsian)		Russia	A member of Atrypidae. The type species is Copperella kaskevichi.	
Cyrtella papula	Sp. nov	Valid	Waterhouse & Balfe	Permian (Changhsingian)	South Curra Limestone	Australia	A member of Spiriferinida belonging to the family Syringothyridae.	
Cyrtonotreta vasculata	Sp. nov	Valid	Benedetto	Ordovician (Darriwilian)	Los Azules Formation	Argentina	A member of Acrotretida belonging to the family Acrotretidae; a species of Cyrtonotreta.	
Dagyssia	Gen. et comb. nov	Valid	Gaetani & Mantovani	Triassic (Anisian)		Croatia; Hungary; Italy; China?	A mentzeliine mentzeliid brachiopod. The type species is "Spiriferina" palaeotypus Loretz (1875); genus might also contain "Mentzelia" multicostata Yang & Xu (1966).	
Dalejina telemanni	Sp. nov	Valid	García-Alcalde	Devonian		Spain	A member of Orthida belonging to the family Rhipidomellidae.	
Drahanorhynchus gleniffensis	Sp. nov	Valid	Mottequin, Sevastopulo & Simon	Carboniferous (Viséan)	Meenymore Formation	Ireland	A member of Orthotetida belonging to the family Schuchertellidae.	
Duartea latoresensis	Sp. nov	Valid	Chacón & Winkler Prins	Carboniferous (Pennsylvanian)		Spain	A member of Productidae, possibly a species of Duartea.	
Echinalosia cenula	Sp. nov	Valid	Waterhouse	Permian	Tiverton Formation	Australia	A member of Productida belonging to the group Strophalosiidina and the family Dasyalosiidae.	
Echinalosia denmeadi	Sp. nov	Valid	Waterhouse & Balfe	Permian (Changhsingian)	South Curra Limestone	Australia	A member of Strophalosiidina belonging to the superfamily Dasyalosioidea and the family Mingenewiidae. Originally described as a species of Echinalosia, subsequently transferred to the genus Capillaria.	
Echinalosia curtosa sulcata	Ssp. nov	Valid	Waterhouse	Permian	Tiverton Formation	Australia	A member of Productida belonging to the group Strophalosiidina and the family Dasyalosiidae. Subsequently raised to the rank of the species Echinalosia? (Echinalosia) sulcata.	
Eodmitria sezgini	Sp. nov	Valid	Gourvennec & Hoşgör	Devonian (latest Givetian to early Frasnian)	Gümüșali Formation	Turkey	A member of Spiriferida belonging to the family Cyrtospiriferidae, a species of Eodmitria.	
Eohadrotreta haydeni	Sp. nov	Valid	Popov et al.	Cambrian	Parahio Formation	India	A member of Acrotretida belonging to the family Acrotretidae, a species of Eohadrotreta.	
Eremithyris? longiquincus	Sp. nov	Valid	Waterhouse	Permian	Tiverton Formation	Australia	A member of Terebratulida belonging to the family Cranaenidae.	
Eucharitina bultyncki	Sp. nov	Valid	García-Alcalde & Herrera	Devonian (early Lochkovian)		Spain	A member of Rhynchonellida belonging to the family Uncinulidae.	
Eucharitina carlsi	Sp. nov	Valid	García-Alcalde & Herrera	Devonian (early Pragian)		Spain	A member of Rhynchonellida belonging to the family Uncinulidae.	
Eurytreta harringtoni	Sp. nov	Valid	Mergl & Herrera in Mergl et al.	Late Cambrian	Lampazar Formation	Argentina		
Evanidisinurostrum saouraense	Sp. nov	Valid	Mottequin et al.	Devonian (Famennian)		Algeria	A rhynchonellid brachiopod, a species of Evanidisinurostrum.	
Fletcherithyris burdenae	Sp. nov	Valid	Waterhouse	Permian	Tiverton Formation	Australia	A member of Terebratulida belonging to the family Dielasmidae.	
Fletcherithyris runnegari	Sp. nov	Valid	Waterhouse & Balfe	Permian (Changhsingian)	South Curra Limestone	Australia	A member of Terebratulida belonging to the family Dielasmidae.	
Geothomasia simplicatas	Sp. nov	Valid	Waterhouse	Permian (Asselian)	Wasp Head Formation	Australia	A member of Spiriferida belonging to the family Ingelarellidae.	
Grantonia murrayi	Sp. nov	Valid	Waterhouse	Permian (Asselian)	Rammutt Formation	Australia	A member of the family Trigonotretidae. Originally described as a species of Grantonia, subsequently tentatively assigned to the genus Trigonotreta.	
Gympietes	Gen. et sp. nov	Valid	Waterhouse	Permian (Asselian)	Rammutt Formation	Australia	A member of the family Rugosochonetidae. The type species is G. aseptus.	
Hadrotreta timchristiorum	Sp. nov	Valid	Popov et al.	Cambrian	Parahio Formation	India	A member of Acrotretida belonging to the family Acrotretidae, a species of Hadrotreta.	
Hibernodonta lakhensis	Sp. nov	Valid	Popov, Holmer & Baars in Popov et al.	Ordovician (Katian)	Chahgonbad Formation	Iran	A rafinesquinid strophomenid brachiopod; a species of Hibernodonta.	
Hindella prima	Sp. nov	Valid	Popov, Holmer & Baars in Popov et al.	Ordovician (Katian)	Chahgonbad Formation	Iran	A meristellid athyridid brachiopod; a species of Hindella.	
Hoskingia glabra	Sp. nov	Valid	Waterhouse	Permian (Asselian)	Rammutt Formation	Australia	A member of Terebratulida belonging to the family Dielasmidae.	
Inflatia ovetensis	Sp. nov	Valid	Chacón & Winkler Prins	Carboniferous (Pennsylvanian)		Spain	A member of Productidae, possibly a species of Inflatia.	
Ingelarella alteplica	Sp. nov	Valid	Waterhouse & Balfe	Permian (Changhsingian)	South Curra Limestone	Australia	A member of Spiriferida belonging to the family Ingelarellidae.	
Ingelarella fergusoni	Sp. nov	Valid	Waterhouse & Balfe	Permian (Changhsingian)	South Curra Limestone	Australia	A member of Spiriferida belonging to the family Ingelarellidae.	
Jafarirhynchus	Gen. et sp. nov	Valid	Popov et al.	Silurian (Telychian)	Niur Formation	Iran	A rhynchotrematoid rhynchonellid brachiopod. The type species is Jafarirhynchus alatus.	
Kerberellus	Gen. et sp. nov	Valid	Devaere, Holmer & Clausen in Devaere et al.	Cambrian (Terreneuvian)	Marcou Formation	France	A mickwitziid-like stem-group brachiopod. The type species is Kerberellus marcouensis.	
Kirkirhynchus	Gen. et comb. nov	Valid	Baranov & Blodgett	Devonian (early Pragian)		United States	A trigonirhynchiid rhynchonellid brachiopod; a new genus for "Camarotoechia" reesidei Kirk & Amsden (1952).	
Koenigoria browni	Sp. nov	Valid	Waterhouse	Permian (Changhsingian)	Gundiah Bridge Greywacke	Australia	A member of Spiriferida belonging to the family Georginakingiidae. Originally described as a species of Koenigoria, subsequently tentatively assigned to the genus Neilotreta.	
Kosagittella robusta	Sp. nov	Valid	Mergl & Jiménez-Sánchez	Devonian (late Emsian)	Daleje-Třebotov Formation	Czech Republic	A member of Obolidae, a species of Kosagittella.	
Ktenopotamorhynchus	Gen. et comb. nov	Valid	Sartenaer	Devonian (Lochkovian)		Czech Republic; Ukraine	A member of Rhynchonellida. The type species is "Rhynchonella" borealiformis Siemiradzki (1906); genus also includes "Plethorhyncha" altera (Barrande, 1879).	
Kutorgina songshanensis	Sp. nov	Valid	Liu et al.	Cambrian		China	A species of Kutorgina.	
Lakismatia sulcata	Sp. nov	Valid	Waterhouse	Permian	Tiverton Formation	Australia	A member of Productida belonging to the group Strophalosiidina and the family Aulostegidae. Originally described as a species of Lakismatia, subsequently tentatively assigned to the genus Lipanteris.	
Leptembolon argentinum	Sp. nov	Valid	Benedetto & Muñoz	Ordovician (Tremadocian)	Santa Rosita Formation	Argentina	A member of Obolidae, a species of Leptembolon.	
Libecoviella lenticularis	Sp. nov	Valid	Mergl & Herrera in Mergl et al.	Late Cambrian	Lampazar Formation	Argentina		
Libecoviella tilcarensis	Sp. nov	Valid	Benedetto & Muñoz	Ordovician (Tremadocian)	Santa Rosita Formation	Argentina	A member of Obolidae, a species of Libecoviella.	
Lingularia salymica	Sp. nov	Valid	Smirnova in Smirnova et al.	Late Jurassic		Russia	A member of Lingulida, a species of Lingularia.	
Lingulella? melonica	Sp. nov	Valid	Mergl & Herrera in Mergl et al.	Late Cambrian	Lampazar Formation	Argentina		
Lochkothele rugellata	Sp. nov	Valid	Mergl & Jiménez-Sánchez	Devonian (late Emsian)	Daleje-Třebotov Formation; Zlíchov Formation	Czech Republic	A member of Discinidae, a species of Lochkothele.	
Lomatorthis? multilamellosa	Sp. nov	Valid	Popov, Holmer & Baars in Popov et al.	Ordovician (Darriwilian)	Chahgonbad Formation	Iran	A glyptorthid orthid brachiopod; possibly a species of Lomatorthis.	
Magniplicatina cranfieldi	Sp. nov	Valid	Waterhouse & Balfe	Permian (Changhsingian)	South Curra Limestone	Australia	A member of Productida belonging to the superfamily Proboscidelloidea and the family Paucispinauriidae.	
Magniplicatina dunstani	Sp. nov	Valid	Waterhouse	Permian (Asselian)	Rammutt Formation	Australia	A member of Productida belonging to the superfamily Proboscidelloidea and the family Paucispinauriidae.	
Maisorthina	Gen. et sp. nov	Valid	García-Alcalde	Devonian (late Emsian)		Spain	A member of Orthida belonging to the family Platyorthidae. The type species is M. saroyani.	
Maorielasma balfei	Sp. nov	Valid	Waterhouse	Permian	Tiverton Formation	Australia	A member of Terebratulida belonging to the family Gilledidae.	
Mariyaspiriferella	Gen. et sp. et comb. nov	Valid	Baranov & Blodgett	Early Devonian		Canada; Russia; United States	A cyrtinid brachiopod. The type species is M. sibirica; genus also includes "Cyrtina" impressio Perry (1984).	
Maxwellosia bryani	Sp. nov	Valid	Waterhouse	Permian	Tiverton Formation	Australia	A member of Productida belonging to the group Strophalosiidina and the family Dasyalosiidae.	
Misensia	Gen. et sp. nov	Valid	Baranov	Devonian (Emsian)		Russia	A member of Atrypidae. The type species is Misensia gracilis.	
Monklandia mcclungi	Sp. nov	Valid	Waterhouse	Permian (Sakmarian)	Rutherford Formation	Australia	A member of Spiriferida belonging to the family Notospiriferidae.	
Neochonetes (Zhongyingia) transversa	Sp. nov	Valid	Zhang et al.	Permian (Lopingian)	Longtan Formation; Yanshi Formation	China	A member of Productida belonging to the family Rugosochonetidae.	
Notospirifer triplicata	Sp. nov	Valid	Waterhouse	Permian	Tiverton Formation	Australia	A member of Spiriferida belonging to the family Notospiriferidae.	
Notostrophia laticostata	Sp. nov	Valid	Waterhouse	Permian	Tiverton Formation	Australia	A member of Strophomenata belonging to the superfamily Orthotetoidea and the family Schuchertellidae.	
Oceania	Gen. et comb. nov	Junior homonym	Poletaev	Carboniferous		Belgium; Russia	A member of Spiriferida belonging to the superfamily Paeckelmanelloidea. The type species is "Spirifer" oceani d'Orbigny (1850). The generic name is preoccupied by Oceania Péron & Lesueur (1810); Poletaev (2024) coined a replacement name Johnsoniana.	
Ogilviella gerensis	Sp. nov	Valid	Baranov	Devonian (Emsian)		Russia	A member of Atrypidae, a species of Ogilviella.	
Oviformia	Gen. et comb. nov	Valid	Waterhouse	Permian	Muree Formation	Australia	A member of Spiriferida belonging to the family Ingelarellidae. The type species is "Spirifera (Brachythyris)" oviformis M'Coy (1847); genus also includes new species O. sweeti.	
Paillettia menae	Sp. nov	Valid	Gourvennec & Hoşgör	Devonian (latest Givetian to early Frasnian)	Gümüșali Formation	Turkey	A member of Spiriferida belonging to the family Adolfiidae, a species of Paillettia.	
Palaeoglossa minima	Sp. nov	Valid	Benedetto	Ordovician (Darriwilian)	Los Azules Formation	Argentina	A member of Obolidae; a species of Palaeoglossa.	
Papulinella wilsoni	Sp. nov	Valid	Waterhouse	Permian	Tiverton Formation	Australia	A member of Spiriferida belonging to the family Notospiriferidae.	
Parmorthina gozonica	Sp. nov	Valid	García-Alcalde	Devonian		Spain	A member of Orthida belonging to the family Dalmanellidae.	
Paryphella acutula	Sp. nov	Valid	Zhang et al.	Permian (Lopingian)	Dalong Formation; Longtan Formation	China	A member of Productida belonging to the family Productellidae.	
Pelmanotreta	Nom. nov	Valid	Skovsted et al.	Early Cambrian		Russia	A replacement name for Cryptotreta Pelman (1977) (preoccupied).	
Permasyrinx archboldi	Sp. nov	Valid	Waterhouse	Permian	Tiverton Formation	Australia	A member of Spiriferinida belonging to the family Syringothyridae.	
Philhedra pauciradiata	Sp. nov	Valid	Benedetto	Ordovician (Darriwilian)	Los Azules Formation	Argentina	A member of Craniidae; a species of Philhedra.	
Plekonella whitehousei	Sp. nov	Valid	Waterhouse	Permian	Tiverton Formation	Australia	A member of Rhynchonellida belonging to the superfamily Wellerelloidea and the family Wellerellidae.	
Portrania	Gen. et sp. nov	Valid	Cocks	Ordovician (late Katian)	Portrane Limestone	Ireland	A chilidiopsoidean brachiopod. The type species is Portrania wrighti Cocks & Harper in Cocks (2015).	
Praeoehlertella lukesi	Sp. nov	Valid	Mergl & Jiménez-Sánchez	Devonian (late Emsian)	Daleje-Třebotov Formation	Czech Republic	A member of Discinidae, a species of Praeoehlertella.	
Prototreta? sumnaensis	Sp. nov	Valid	Popov et al.	Cambrian	Parahio Formation	India	A member of Acrotretida belonging to the family Acrotretidae, possibly a species of Prototreta.	
Psilothyris corbachoi	Sp. nov	Valid	Calzada & Moreno	Early Cretaceous (Aptian)		Spain	A member of Terebratellidina belonging to the family Laqueidae and the subfamily Terebrataliopsinae, a species of Psilothyris.	
Ptychomentzelia	Gen. et comb. et sp. nov	Valid	Gaetani & Mantovani	Middle Triassic		Austria; Bosnia and Herzegovina; Hungary; Italy; Romania; Turkey	A tethyspirine mentzeliid brachiopod. The type species is "Spiriferina" propontica Toula (1896); genus also contains "Spiriferina" ptychitiphila Bittner (1890), as well as the new species Ptychomentzelia ritensis.	
Raisiya	Gen. et sp. nov	Valid	Baranov	Devonian (Emsian)		Russia	A member of Atrypidae. The type species is Raisiya solonchanensis.	
Rhipidomella cervantesi	Sp. nov	Valid	García-Alcalde	Devonian		Spain	A member of Orthida belonging to the family Rhipidomellidae.	
Rugaria semicircularis	Sp. nov	Valid	Afanasjeva, Jun-ichi & Tomohiko	Permian		Japan	A member of Chonetida belonging to the family Rugosochonetidae, a species of Rugaria.	
Rukavischnikovia	Nom. nov	Valid	Doweld	Ordovician (Katian)		Kazakhstan	A member of Spiriferida; a replacement name for Iliella Rukavischnikova (1980).	
Saltaia	Gen. et sp. nov	Valid	Mergl & Herrera in Mergl et al.	Late Cambrian	Lampazar Formation	Argentina	A member of Elkaniidae. The type species is Saltaia lampazarensis	
Savagerhynchus	Gen. et sp. nov	Valid	Baranov & Blodgett	Devonian (early Pragian)		United States	A trigonirhynchiid rhynchonellid brachiopod. The type species is Savagerhynchus hecetaensis.	
Scalenomena	Gen. et comb. nov	Valid	Cocks	Ordovician (early Katian	Craighead Limestone	United Kingdom	A chilidiopsoidean brachiopod. A new genus for "Fardenia" scalena Williams (1962).	
Schizambon cardonalis	Sp. nov	Valid	Mergl & Herrera in Mergl et al.	Late Cambrian	Lampazar Formation	Argentina		
Schizobolus pilasiensis	Sp. nov	Valid	Mergl in Morzadec et al.	Devonian (Givetian)	Floresta Formation	Colombia	A member of the family Trematidae.	
Sillakkudirhynchia	Gen. et comb. nov	Valid	Radulović et al.	Late Cretaceous (Coniacian to early Maastrichtian)	Sillakkudi Formation	India	A member of Rhynchonellida belonging to the family Tetrarhynchiidae. A new genus for "Rhynchonella" plicatiloides Stoliczka (1872); genus also contains "Cretirhynchia" sahnii Radulović & Ramamoorthy (1992).	
Sivorthis precordillerana	Sp. nov	Valid	Benedetto	Ordovician (Darriwilian)	Los Azules Formation; San Juan Formation	Argentina	A member of Orthida belonging to the family Orthidae; a species of Sivorthis.	
Svalbardia armstrongi	Sp. nov	Valid	Waterhouse	Permian	Tiverton Formation	Australia	A member of the family Rugosochonetidae. Originally described as a species of Svalbardia, subsequently transferred to the genus Capillonia.	
Svalbardia saeptata	Sp. nov	Valid	Waterhouse	Permian	Farley Formation	Australia	A member of the family Rugosochonetidae. Originally described as a species of Svalbardia, subsequently transferred to the genus Capillonia.	
Talexirhynchia	Gen. et sp. nov	Valid	Feldman et al.	Middle Jurassic (Callovian)	Mughanniyya Formation	Jordan	A rhynchonellid brachiopod. The type species is Talexirhynchia kadishi.	
Tethyochonetes minor	Sp. nov	Valid	Zhang et al.	Permian (Changhsingian)	Longtan Formation	China	A member of Productida belonging to the family Rugosochonetidae.	
Thecocyrtella dagysii	Sp. nov	Valid	Halamski et al.	Middle Triassic (Ladinian)		Croatia	A member of Spiriferida; a species of Thecocyrtella.	
Theodossia kagarmanovi	Sp. nov	Valid	Bezgodova	Devonian (Frasnian)		Russia	A member of Spiriferida belonging to the family Theodossiidae, a species of Theodossia.	
Theodossia novosemelica	Sp. nov	Valid	Bezgodova	Devonian (Frasnian)		Russia	A member of Spiriferida belonging to the family Theodossiidae, a species of Theodossia.	
Theodossia tcherkesovae	Sp. nov	Valid	Bezgodova	Devonian (Frasnian)		Russia	A member of Spiriferida belonging to the family Theodossiidae, a species of Theodossia.	
Torobolus	Gen. et sp. nov	Valid	Benedetto & Muñoz	Ordovician (Tremadocian)	Devendeus Formation	Argentina	A member of Obolidae. The type species is Torobolus subplanus.	
Trigonirhynchia celtiberica	Sp. nov	Valid	García-Alcalde & Herrera	Devonian (early Pragian)		Spain	A member of Rhynchonellida belonging to the family Trigonirhynchiidae.	
Trigonirhynchia palentina	Sp. nov	Valid	García-Alcalde & Herrera	Devonian (early Pragian)		Spain	A member of Rhynchonellida belonging to the family Trigonirhynchiidae.	
Tumulosulcus	Gen. et comb. nov	Valid	Waterhouse	Permian (Roadian)	Moonlight Sandstone	Australia	A member of Spiriferida belonging to the family Ingelarellidae. The type species is "Ingelarella" magna Campbell (1959).	
Validifera	Gen. et comb. et sp. nov	Valid	Waterhouse	Permian	Tiverton Formation	Australia	A member of Spiriferida belonging to the family Ingelarellidae. The type species is "Ingelarella" valida Campbell (1961); genus includes new species V. prima.	
Yangtzeella chupananica	Sp. nov	Valid	Popov, Holmer & Baars in Popov et al.	Ordovician (Darriwilian)	Chahgonbad Formation	Iran	A clarkellid pentamerid brachiopod; a species of Yangtzeella.	

== Echinoderms ==
Name	Novelty	Status	Authors	Age	Unit	Location	Notes	Images
Aegyptiaris	Gen. et sp. et comb. nov	Valid	Abdelhamid & Abdelghany	Cretaceous (Aptian to Cenomanian)		Egypt	An emiratiid sea urchin. The type species is Aegyptiaris halalensis; genus also contains "Trochodiadema" isidis Fourtau (1921).	
Aganaster jagiellonicus	Sp. nov	Valid	Thuy, Kutscher & Płachno	Carboniferous (late Tournaisian)	Mazurowe Doły Formation	Poland	A brittle star belonging to the suborder Ophiurina, a species of Aganaster.	
Archaeocidaris marmorcataractensis	Sp. nov	Valid	Thompson et al.	Carboniferous (early Pennsylvanian)	Marble Falls Formation	United States	A sea urchin, a species of Archaeocidaris.	
Baficrinus	Gen. et sp. nov	Valid	Prokop & Nohejlová	Devonian (late Emsian)	Daleje-Třebotov Formation	Czech Republic	A crinoid belonging to the group Disparida and the family Zophocrinidae. The type species is Baficrinus vigilis.	
Baudicrinus	Gen. et sp. nov	Valid	Oji & Twitchett	Early Triassic	AI Jil Formation	Oman	A dadocrinid articulate crinoid, a relative of encrinids. The type species is Baudicrinus krystyni.	
Bizarroglobus	Gen. et sp. nov	Valid	Sumrall & Sprinkle	Ordovician	Kanosh Shale	United States	An edrioasteroid. The type species is Bizarroglobus medusae.	
Browerocrinus	Gen. et sp. nov	Valid	Ausich, Peter & Ettensohn	Silurian (Rhuddanian)	Brassfield Formation	United States	A crinoid. The type species is Browerocrinus arthrikos.	
Callocystites fresti	Sp. nov	Valid	Paul	Silurian	Massie Formation	United States	A callocystitid cystoid, a species of Callocystites.	
'Cidaris' labergensis	Sp. nov	Valid	Zonneveld, Furlong & Sanders	Late Triassic	Aksala Formation	Canada	A sea urchin. Zonneveld, Furlong & Sanders (2015) assign it to the form genus 'Cidaris', stressing that it does not imply affinity with the extant genus Cidaris.	
Conollia sporranoides	Sp. nov	Valid	Rahman, Stewart & Zamora	Ordovician (Sandbian)	Balclatchie Formation	United Kingdom	A member of Ctenocystoidea, a species of Conollia.	
Deltoblastus beaveri	Sp. nov	Valid	Morgan	Permian		Timor	A blastoid belonging to the family Schizoblastidae.	
Deltoblastus elevatus	Sp. nov	Valid	Morgan	Permian		Timor	A blastoid belonging to the family Schizoblastidae.	
Deltoblastus ewini	Sp. nov	Valid	Morgan	Permian		Timor	A blastoid belonging to the family Schizoblastidae.	
Dimerocrinites (Dimerocrinites) cheilobathron	Sp. nov	Valid	Clement & Brett	Early Devonian (Lochkovian)	Birdsong Shale	United States	A camerate crinoid belonging to the group Diplobathrida.	
Echinanthus callosensis	Nom. nov	Valid	Carrasco	Eocene (Lutetian)		Spain	A sea urchin; a replacement name for Echinanthus dorsalis Cotteau (1889).	
Ekmelocrinus	Gen. et comb. nov	Valid	Webster & Donovan	Permian		Indonesia	A crinoid. Genus includes Ekmelocrinus amplior (Wanner, 1924), Ekmelocrinus subamplior (Wanner, 1949), Ekmelocrinus ovoides (Wanner, 1949), Ekmelocrinus verbeeki (Wanner, 1916) and Ekmelocrinus vermistriatus (Wanner, 1916).	
Enakomusium	Gen. et comb. nov	Valid	Thuy	Jurassic (Toarcian to Oxfordian)		France; Germany; Switzerland; United Kingdom	A brittle star. A new genus for "Ophioderma" weymouthiense Damon (1880); genus also contains "Ophiomusium" ferrugineum Boehm (1889), "Ophiolepis" leckenbyi Wright (1880), "Ophiomusium" geisingense Kutscher (1992), "Ophiomusium" mammillatum Hess (1966) and "Ophiura" gagnebini Thurmann (1851).	
Eodevonocystis	Gen. et sp. nov	Valid	Clement & Brett	Early Devonian (Lochkovian)	Birdsong Shale	United States	A mitrate belonging to the group Anomalocystitida. The type species is E. marilynni.	
Eodolatocrinus	Gen. et sp. et comb. nov	Valid	Clement & Brett	Late Silurian-early Devonian	Bob Limestone (Brownsport Group); Lower Birdsong Shale	United States	A crinoid belonging to the group Monobathrida. The type species is E. hlabsei; genus also includes "Technocrinus" niagarensis Springer (1921).	
Eohadroblastus	Gen. et sp. nov	Valid	Clement & Brett	Early Devonian (Lochkovian)	Birdsong Shale	United States	A blastoid belonging to the group Fissiculata. The type species is E. inexpectatus.	
Eohalysiocrinus broweri	Sp. nov	Valid	Clement & Brett	Early Devonian (Lochkovian)	Birdsong Shale; Rockhouse Limestone	United States	A disparid crinoid belonging to the group Calceocrinida.	
Eohalysiocrinus gibsoni	Sp. nov	Valid	Clement & Brett	Early Devonian (Lochkovian)	Birdsong Shale; Rockhouse Limestone	United States	A disparid crinoid belonging to the group Calceocrinida.	
Eudimerocrinus hlabsei	Sp. nov	Valid	Clement & Brett	Late Silurian (Pridoli)-early Devonian (Lochkovian)	Decatur Limestone; Rockhouse Limestone	United States	A camerate crinoid belonging to the group Diplobathrida.	
Exaesiodiscus derbyi	Sp. nov	Valid	Scheffler, da Fonseca & Fernandes	Devonian (middle Eifelian)	Maecuru Formation	Brazil	A crinoid, a species of Exaesiodiscus.	
Frasericrinus	Gen. et sp. nov	Valid	Ausich et al.	Early Cretaceous (probably early late Albian)	Peace River Formation	Canada	An isocrinid crinoid. The type species is Frasericrinus mauricensis.	
Globoeocrinus zhaoyuanlongensis	Sp. nov	Valid	Yang et al.	Cambrian	Balang Formation	China	An eocrinoid, a species of Globoeocrinus.	
Guangxicrinus	Gen. et sp. nov	Valid	Webster & Chen	Devonian (Eifelian)	Yingtang Formation	China	A marsupiocrinid crinoid. The type species is Guangxicrinus xiangzhouensis.	
Hemidiadema batalleri	Sp. nov	Valid	Clément	Early Cretaceous (Aptian)		Spain	A sea urchin belonging to the family Glyphocyphidae, a species of Hemidiadema.	
Hemidiadema forcallensis	Sp. nov	Valid	Clément	Early Cretaceous (Aptian)		Spain	A sea urchin belonging to the family Glyphocyphidae, a species of Hemidiadema.	
Hemidiadema malladai	Sp. nov	Valid	Clément	Early Cretaceous (Aptian)		Spain	A sea urchin belonging to the family Glyphocyphidae, a species of Hemidiadema.	
Heviacrinus tromelini	Sp. nov	Valid	Lefebvre et al.	Ordovician (late Darriwilian)		France	A crinoid, a species of Heviacrinus.	
Icthyocrinus erugatus	Sp. nov	Valid	Clement & Brett	Early Devonian (Lochkovian)	Rockhouse Limestone	United States	A cladid crinoid belonging to the group Sagenocrinida.	
Iocrinus africanus	Sp. nov	Valid	Zamora, Rahman & Ausich	Ordovician (Darriwilian)	Taddrist Formation	Morocco	An iocrinid crinoid, a species of Iocrinus.	
Lanxocolumnus (col.) chaleurensis	Sp. nov	Valid	Donovan & Keighley	Silurian (Telychian)		Canada	A crinoid, a species of Lanxocolumnus.	
Lapidaster hellersi	Sp. nov	Valid	Numberger-Thuy & Thuy	Middle Jurassic (earliest Bajocian)		Luxembourg	A brittle star belonging to the family Ophiacanthidae, a species of Lapidaster.	
Laudonomphalus ferreirai	Sp. nov	Valid	Scheffler, da Fonseca & Fernandes	Devonian (middle Eifelian)	Maecuru Formation	Brazil	A crinoid, a species of Laudonomphalus.	
Llanocystis	Gen. et sp. nov	Valid	Zamora, Sumrall & Sprinkle	Cambrian (Furongian)	Wilberns Formation	United States	An eocrinoid of uncertain phylogenetic placement. The type species is Llanocystis wilbernsensis.	
Lovenicystis kopfi	Sp. nov	Valid	Paul	Silurian		United States	A callocystitid cystoid, a species of Lovenicystis.	
Marettocrinus hartti	Sp. nov	Valid	Scheffler, da Fonseca & Fernandes	Devonian (middle Eifelian)	Maecuru Formation	Brazil	A crinoid, a species of Marettocrinus.	
Marettocrinus katzeri	Sp. nov	Valid	Scheffler, da Fonseca & Fernandes	Devonian (middle Eifelian)	Maecuru Formation	Brazil	A crinoid, a species of Marettocrinus.	
Marginix	Nom. nov	Valid	Martínez & del Río	Devonian	Talacasto Formation	Argentina	A brittle star belonging to the order Oegophiurida and the family Encrinasteridae; a replacement name for Marginaster Haude (1995) and Marginura Haude (1999) (both preoccupied).	
Macrostylocrinus tertibrachialis	Sp. nov	Valid	Clement & Brett	Early Devonian (Lochkovian)	Rockhouse Limestone	United States	A camerate crinoid belonging to the group Monobathrida.	
Marsupiocrinus (Amarsupiocrinus) devonicus	Sp. nov	Valid	Clement & Brett	Early Devonian (Lochkovian)	Birdsong Shale	United States	A camerate crinoid belonging to the group Monobathrida.	
Notatudiadema	Gen. et sp. nov	Valid	Abdelhamid & Abdelghany	Late Cretaceous (Cenomanian)		Egypt	A diadematoid sea urchin. The type species is Notatudiadema rekeibensis.	
Ophiocantabria	Gen. et sp. nov	Valid	Blake, Zamora & García-Alcalde	Devonian (Lochkovian)	Furada Formation	Spain	A brittle star belonging to the order Oegophiurida, suborder Lysophiurina and the family Encrinasteridae. The type species is Ophiocantabria elegans.	
Ophiodoris reconciliator	Sp. nov	Valid	Thuy	Middle Jurassic (early Bajocian)	Longwy Formation	France	A brittle star belonging to the family Ophionereididae, a species of Ophiodoris.	
Ophiotitanos aschmannicor	Sp. nov	Valid	Thuy	Middle Jurassic (early Bajocian)	Longwy Formation	France	A brittle star belonging to the family Ophiodermatidae, a species of Ophiotitanos.	
Paracidaris (Anisocidaris) eluveitie	Sp. nov	Valid	Hostettler & Menkveld-Gfeller	Late Jurassic (Oxfordian)	Wildegg Formation	Switzerland	A member of Cidaroida, a species of Paracidaris.	
Parahormocrinus	Gen. et sp. nov	Valid	Clement & Brett	Late Silurian (Pridoli)	Decatur Limestone	United States	A cladid crinoid belonging to the group Sagenocrinida. The type species is P. decaturensis.	
Paramarsupiocrinus	Gen. et sp. nov	Valid	Clement & Brett	Late Silurian (Pridoli)		United States	A camerate crinoid belonging to the group Monobathrida. The type species is P. broadheadi.	
Parapatelliocrinus	Gen. et sp. nov	Valid	Clement & Brett	Devonian (Lochkovian)	Lower Rockhouse Limestone	United States	A crinoid belonging to the group Monobathrida. The type species is P. broweri.	
Pentaridica mendesi	Sp. nov	Valid	Scheffler, da Fonseca & Fernandes	Devonian (middle Eifelian)	Maecuru Formation	Brazil	A crinoid, a species of Pentaridica.	
Polycidaris gygii	Sp. nov	Valid	Hostettler & Menkveld-Gfeller	Late Jurassic (Oxfordian)	Lochen Formation; Wildegg Formation	Germany; Switzerland	A member of Cidaroida, a species of Polycidaris.	
Porosublastus	Gen. et sp. nov	Valid	Sprinkle & Sumrall	Early Ordovician	Ninemile Shale	United States	An edrioasteroid. The type species is Porosublastus inexpectus.	
Probalocrinus	Gen. et comb. nov	Valid	Clement & Brett	Late Silurian (Ludlovian)-early Devonian (Lochkovian)	Birdsong Shale; Henryhouse Formation	United States	A camerate crinoid belonging to the group Diplobathrida. The type species is "Siphonocrinus" dignis Strimple (1963).	
Protogloboeocrinus	Gen. et sp. nov	Valid	Zhao et al.	Cambrian	Balang Formation	China	A member of Eocrinoidea. Genus includes new species P. yini Zhao, Peng & Wu in Zhao et al. (2015).	
Pseudedriophus	Gen. et sp. nov	Valid	Sprinkle & Sumrall	Early Ordovician	Ninemile Shale	United States	An edrioasteroid. The type species is Pseudedriophus guensburgi.	
Quechuacrinus	Gen. et sp. nov	Valid	Guensburg & Waisfeld	Ordovician (Floian)		Argentina	A crinoid. The type species is Quechuacrinus ticsa.	
Ramseyocrinus argentinus	Sp. nov	Valid	Guensburg & Waisfeld	Ordovician (Floian)		Argentina	A crinoid, a species of Ramseyocrinus.	
Rautscholdticrinus	Gen. et comb. nov	Valid	Webster & Donovan	Permian		Indonesia	A crinoid. Genus includes Rautscholdticrinus indicus (Wanner, 1916) and Rautscholdticrinus weidnerii (Wanner, 1937).	
Rhabdocidaris deubelbeissi	Sp. nov	Valid	Hostettler & Menkveld-Gfeller	Late Jurassic (Oxfordian)	Wildegg Formation	Switzerland	A member of Cidaroida, a species of Rhabdocidaris.	
Ristnacrinus oepiki	Sp. nov	Valid	Ausich, Rozhnov & Kammer	Ordovician (Katian)		Estonia	A crinoid related to Iocrinus, a species of Ristnacrinus.	
Salamonicrinus	Gen. et sp. nov	Valid	Trzęsiok	Late Jurassic (Tithonian)		Poland	A cyrtocrinid crinoid. The type species is Salamonicrinus prodigiosum.	
Salirocystis	Gen. et comb. nov	Valid	Paul	Silurian		United States	A callocystitid cystoid; a new genus for "Apiocystites" anna Safford (1869).	
Temnocrinus americanus	Sp. nov	Valid	Ausich, Peter & Ettensohn	Silurian (Rhuddanian)	Brassfield Formation	United States	A crinoid, a species of Temnocrinus.	
Velocrinus	Gen. et sp. nov	Valid	Ausich, Wilson & Vinn	Late Silurian	Kaugatuma Formation	Estonia	A crotalocrinitid crinoid. The type species is Velocrinus coniculus.	

== Conodonts ==
Name	Novelty	Status	Authors	Age	Unit	Location	Notes	Images
Arianagnathus	Gen. et sp. nov	Valid	Männik, Miller & Hairapetian	Silurian	Niur Formation	Iran	A member of Prioniodontida, possibly a balognathid. The type species is Arianagnathus jafariani.	
Dichognathus zhaoi	Sp. nov	Valid	Xiong, Wu & Wang	Ordovician	Tarim Basin	China		
Eolinguipolygnathus radula	Sp. nov	Valid	Aboussalam & Becker in Aboussalam, Becker & Bultynck	Devonian (early Emsian)		Morocco		
Eoplacognathus aisangensis	Sp. nov	Valid	Xiong, Wu & Wang	Ordovician	Tarim Basin	China		
Gapparodus gapparites	Sp. nov	Valid	Yang, Steiner & Keupp	Early Cambrian	Shuijingtuo Formation	China	A member of Furnishinidae; a species of Gapparodus.	
Hayashiella	Gen. et comb. nov	Valid	Kiliç et al.	Late Triassic		Canada; Italy; Japan; Slovakia	A member of Gondolellidae. A new genus for "Metapolygnathus" nodosus Hayashi (1968); genus also includes "Gondolella" carpathica Mock (1979), H. lindae (Orchard) and H. permica (Hayashi).	
Hindeodus capitanensis	Sp. nov	Valid	Wardlaw & Nestell	Permian		United States		
Icriodus ovalis	Sp. nov	Valid	Bultynck in Aboussalam, Becker & Bultynck	Devonian (late Emsian)	Mdâouer-el-Kbîr Formation	Morocco		
Icriodus praerectirostratus	Sp. nov	Valid	Bultynck in Aboussalam, Becker & Bultynck	Devonian (late Emsian)	Timrhanrhart Formation	Morocco		
Mazzaella	Gen. et comb. nov	Valid	Kiliç et al.	Late Triassic		Germany; Hungary; Italy; Turkey	A member of Gondolellidae. A new genus for "Epigondolella" carnica Krystyn (1975); genus also includes "Metapolygnathus" baloghi Kovacs (1977).	
Moskalenkodus	Gen. et comb. nov	Valid	Dzik	Late Ordovician	Krivaya Luka Formation; Makarovo Formation; Tunguz Basin	Russia	A member of Prioniodontida belonging to the family Distomodontidae. A new genus for "Amorphognathus" quinquiradiatus Moskalenko in Kanygin et al. (1977). Genus also includes Moskalenkodus cruciformis (Moskalenko, 1970).	
Neostreptognathodus costatus	Sp. nov	Valid	Wang & Zhang	Early Permian	Amushan Formation	China		
Ozarkodina derenjalensis	Sp. nov	Valid	Männik, Miller & Hairapetian	Silurian	Niur Formation	Iran	A member of Ozarkodinida, a spathognathodontid; a species of Ozarkodina.	
Polygnathus bicristatus	Sp. nov	Valid	Mossoni et al.	Late Devonian or Early Carboniferous		Italy	A member of Ozarkodinida belonging to the family Polygnathidae, a species of Polygnathus.	
Polygnathus nuragicus	Sp. nov	Valid	Mossoni et al.	Late Devonian or Early Carboniferous		Italy	A member of Ozarkodinida belonging to the family Polygnathidae, a species of Polygnathus.	
Postoistodus	Gen. et 2 sp. nov	Valid	Xiong, Wu & Wang	Ordovician	Tarim Basin	China	Genus includes new species P. elongatus and P. tridens.	
Pseudohindeodus brevis	Sp. nov	Valid	Wardlaw & Nestell	Permian		United States		
Pseudopolygnathus granulobatus	Sp. nov	Valid	Mossoni et al.	Late Devonian or Early Carboniferous		Italy	A member of Ozarkodinida belonging to the family Polygnathidae, a species of Pseudopolygnathus.	
Pygodus serrus ambonis	Subsp. nov	Valid	Xiong, Wu & Wang	Ordovician	Tarim Basin	China		
Spathogondolella	Gen. et sp. nov	Valid	Jiang in Chen et al.	Early Triassic		China	The type species is Spathogondolella jiarongensis.	
Vjalovognathus nicolli	Sp. nov	Valid	Yuan, Shen & Henderson in Yuan et al.	Early Permian	Xiala Formation	China	A species of Vjalovognathus.	

== Amphibians ==
=== Research ===
- A study of the anatomy of the skull of Acanthostega gunnari is published by Porro, Rayfield & Clack (2015).
- A study of the skeletal morphogenesis of the lepospondyls Microbrachis pelikani and Hyloplesion longicostatum is published by Olori (2015).
- A study of the anatomy of the skull of the lepospondyl Quasicaecilia texana is published by Pardo, Szostakiwskyj & Anderson (2015).

=== New taxa ===
==== Temnospondyls ====
Name	Novelty	Status	Authors	Age	Unit	Location	Notes	Images
Eocyclotosaurus appetolatus	Sp. nov	Valid	Rinehart, Lucas & Schoch	Middle Triassic	Moenkopi Formation	United States	A capitosaur, a species of Eocyclotosaurus.	
Metoposaurus algarvensis	Sp. nov	Valid	Brusatte et al.	Late Triassic		Portugal	A species of Metoposaurus.	
Parapytanga	Gen. et sp. nov	Valid	Strapasson, Pinheiro & Soares	Middle or late Permian	Rio do Rasto Formation	Brazil	A basal member of Stereospondylomorpha. The type species is Parapytanga catarinensis.	
Procuhy	Gen. et sp. nov	Valid	Cisneros et al.	Permian (Cisuralian)	Lower Pedra de Fogo Formation	Brazil	A member of Trimerorhachidae. The type species is Procuhy nazariensis.	
Timonya	Gen. et sp. nov	Valid	Cisneros et al.	Permian (Cisuralian)	Lower Pedra de Fogo Formation	Brazil	A member of Dvinosauria. The type species is Timonya anneae.	

==== Lepospondyls ====
Name	Novelty	Status	Authors	Age	Unit	Location	Notes	Images
Aletrimyti	Gen. et sp. nov	Valid	Szostakiwskyj, Pardo & Anderson	Permian (Kungurian)	Fairmont Shale	United States	A member of Recumbirostra. The type species is Aletrimyti gaskillae.	
Batropetes appelensis	Sp. nov	Valid	Glienke	Early Permian	Saar–Nahe Basin	Germany	A species of Batropetes.	
Batropetes palatinus	Sp. nov	Valid	Glienke	Early Permian	Saar–Nahe Basin	Germany	A species of Batropetes.	
Dvellecanus	Gen. et sp. nov	Valid	Szostakiwskyj, Pardo & Anderson	Permian (Kungurian)	Fairmont Shale	United States	A member of Recumbirostra. The type species is Dvellecanus carrolli.	

==== Lissamphibians ====
Name	Novelty	Status	Authors	Age	Unit	Location	Notes	Images
Bufo mirus	Sp. nov	Valid	Syromyatnikova	Late Early – early Middle Miocene	Khalagay Formation	Russia	A true toad of uncertain phylogenetic placement, most similar and possibly related to the Mongolian toad.	
Hensonbatrachus	Gen. et sp. nov	Valid	Gardner & Brinkman	Late Cretaceous (Campanian)	Dinosaur Park Formation; Oldman Formation	Canada	A frog. The type species is Hensonbatrachus kermiti.	
Lepidobatrachus australis	Sp. nov	Valid	Nicoli	Late Miocene to Early Pliocene	Monte Hermoso Formation	Argentina	A frog belonging to the family Ceratophryidae, a species of Lepidobatrachus.	
Palaeoplethodon	Gen. et sp. nov	Valid	Poinar & Wake	Eocene or Miocene		Dominican Republic	A lungless salamander found in Dominican amber. The type species is Palaeoplethodon hispaniolae.	
Tyrrellbatrachus	Gen. et sp. nov	Valid	Gardner	Late Cretaceous (Campanian)	Dinosaur Park Formation	Canada	A frog of uncertain phylogenetic placement. The type species is Tyrrellbatrachus brinkmani.	
Varibatrachus	Gen. et sp. nov	Valid	Parmley, Chandler & Chandler	Miocene (late Clarendonian)	Ash Hollow Formation	United States	A frog of uncertain phylogenetic placement. The type species is Varibatrachus abraczinskasae.	

==== Diadectomorphs ====
Name	Novelty	Status	Authors	Age	Unit	Location	Notes	Images
Alveusdectes	Gen. et sp. nov	Valid	Liu & Bever	Late Permian (Wuchiapingian, roughly 256 Ma)	Shangshihezi Formation	China	A diadectid. The type species is Alveusdectes fenestralis.	

== Synapsids ==
=== Non-mammalian synapsids ===
==== Research ====
- Redescription of the anatomy of Tiarajudens eccentricus is published by Cisneros et al. (2015), who compare the species with Anomocephalus africanus.

==== New taxa ====
Name	Novelty	Status	Authors	Age	Unit	Location	Notes	Images
Endothiodon tolani	Sp. nov	Valid	Cox & Angielczyk	Permian	Ruhuhu Formation	Tanzania	A dicynodont, a species of Endothiodon.	
Ichibengops	Gen. et sp. nov	Valid	Huttenlocker, Sidor & Angielczyk	Late Permian	Madumabisa Mudstone Formation	Zambia	A therocephalian. The type species is Ichibengops munyamadziensis.	
Lende	Gen. et sp. nov	Valid	Kruger et al.	Late Permian	Chiweta Beds	Malawi	A burnetiamorph biarmosuchian therapsid. The type species is Lende chiweta.	
Nothogomphodon sanjiaoensis	Sp. nov	Valid	Liu & Abdala	Middle Triassic	Ermaying Formation	China	A therocephalian, a species of Nothogomphodon.	
Ruberodon	Gen. et sp. nov	Valid	Ray	Late Triassic	Tiki Formation	India	A traversodontid cynodont. The type species is Ruberodon roychowdhurii.	
Sinokannemeyeria baidaoyuensis	Sp. nov	Valid	Liu	Middle Triassic	Tongchuan Formation	China	A kannemeyeriiform dicynodont, a species of Sinokannemeyeria.	

== Other animals ==
=== Research ===
- A study of phylogenetic relationships of the Ediacaran animal Namacalathus, interpreting it as a member of Lophotrochozoa related to bryozoans and brachiopods, is published by Zhuravlev, Wood & Penny (2015).

=== New taxa ===
Name	Novelty	Status	Authors	Age	Unit	Location	Notes	Images
Aegirocassis	Gen. et sp. nov	Valid	Van Roy, Daley & Briggs	Early Ordovician		Morocco	A hurdiid radiodont. The type species is Aegirocassis benmoulae.	
Allonnia tintinopsis	Sp. nov	Valid	Bengtson & Collins	Cambrian	Burgess Shale; El Gavilán Formation	Canada; Mexico	A chancelloriid, a species of Allonnia.	
Anguispongia siciliana	Sp. nov	Valid	Senowbari-Daryan, Di Stefano & Abate	Late Triassic		Italy	A demosponge belonging to the group Agelasida and the family Auriculospongiidae.	
Archiasterella coriacea	Sp. nov	Valid	Bengtson & Collins	Cambrian	Burgess Shale	Canada	A chancelloriid, a species of Archiasterella.	
Atrochaetetes conicus	Sp. nov	Valid	Senowbari-Daryan, Di Stefano & Abate	Late Triassic		Italy	A demosponge.	
Banffia episoma	Sp. nov	Valid	Conway Morris et al.	Cambrian	Spence Shale	United States	An early deuterostome, a species of Banffia.	
Carterina burgioi	Sp. nov	Valid	Senowbari-Daryan, Di Stefano & Abate	Late Triassic		Italy; Turkey	A demosponge belonging to the group Agelasida and the family Disjectoporidae.	
Collinsium	Gen. et sp. nov	Valid	Yang et al.	Early Cambrian	Xiaoshiba Lagerstätte	China	A lobopodian belonging to the lineage leading to the velvet worms. The type species is Collinsium ciliosum.	
Colospongia cribrifera	Sp. nov	Valid	Senowbari-Daryan, Link & Riedel	Late Triassic (Norian)		Turkey	A sponge, a species of Colospongia.	
Conochaetetes	Gen. et sp. nov	Valid	Senowbari-Daryan, Di Stefano & Abate	Late Triassic		Italy	A demosponge. Genus includes new species C. magnitubus.	
Costatulites kimi	Sp. nov	Valid	Ghavidel-Syooki et al.	Ordovician (Katian)		Iran	A member of Tentaculita (a group of animals of uncertain phylogenetic placement, possibly molluscs), a species of Costatulites.	
Cyrtograptus fui	Sp. nov	Valid	Wang et al.	Silurian (Llandovery)		China	A graptolite, a species of Cyrtograptus.	
Dailyatia bacata	Sp. nov	Valid	Skovsted et al.	Cambrian		Australia	A tommotiid.	
Dailyatia helica	Sp. nov	Valid	Skovsted et al.	Cambrian		Australia	A tommotiid.	
Disjectopora gaetanii	Sp. nov	Valid	Senowbari-Daryan, Di Stefano & Abate	Late Triassic		Austria; Italy; Oman; Turkey	A demosponge belonging to the group Agelasida and the family Disjectoporidae.	
Eocyathispongia	Gen. et sp. nov	Valid	Yin et al.	Precambrian (Ediacaran)	Doushantuo Formation	China	A sponge. The type species is Eocyathispongia qiania.	
Eokinorhynchus	Gen. et sp. nov	Valid	Zhang et al.	Cambrian (Fortunian)	Dengying Formation	China	A kinorhynch-like scalidophoran. The type species is Eokinorhynchus rarus.	
Eolarva	Gen. et sp. nov	Valid	Zhang & Dong	Cambrian (Fortunian)	Kuanchuanpu Formation	China	An animal of uncertain phylogenetic placement, possibly a cnidarian-grade animal. The type species is Eolarva kuanchuanpuensis.	
Galeactena	Gen. et sp. nov	Valid	Ou et al.	Early Cambrian	Heilinpu Formation	China	A comb jelly. The type species is Galeactena hemispherica.	
Gamascolex vanroyi	Sp. nov	Valid	Gutiérrez-Marco & García-Bellido	Late Ordovician		Morocco	A palaeoscolecid worm, a species of Gamascolex.	
Gemmactena	Gen. et sp. nov	Valid	Ou et al.	Early Cambrian	Heilinpu Formation	China	A comb jelly. The type species is Gemmactena actinala.	
Globucatenula	Gen. et sp. nov	Valid	Senowbari-Daryan, Di Stefano & Abate	Late Triassic		Italy	A demosponge. Genus includes new species G. siciliana.	
Glyptograptus perneri	Sp. nov	Valid	Štorch	Silurian		Czech Republic	A graptolite belonging to the family Retiolitidae, a species of Glyptograptus.	
Guanshanchaeta	Gen. et sp. nov	Valid	Liu et al.	Early Cambrian	Wulongqing Formation	China	A polychaete annelid. The type species is Guanshanchaeta felicia.	
Hindenites parkheadensis	Sp. nov	Valid	Eriksson & von Bitter	Silurian (Wenlock)	Eramosa Lagerstätte	Canada	A polychaete, a species of Hindenites.	
Incertuspongia	Gen. et sp. nov	Valid	Senowbari-Daryan, Di Stefano & Abate	Late Triassic		Italy	A demosponge. Genus includes new species I. maxima.	
Irregulaspongia	Gen. et 2 sp. nov	Valid	Senowbari-Daryan, Di Stefano & Abate	Late Triassic		Italy; Turkey	A demosponge belonging to the group Agelasida and the family Auriculospongiidae. Genus includes I. magna and I. parva.	
Magnicanalifera	Gen. et sp. nov	Valid	Senowbari-Daryan, Di Stefano & Abate	Late Triassic		Italy	A demosponge. Genus includes new species M. lupensis.	
Multilaticanalia	Gen. et 2 sp. nov	Valid	Senowbari-Daryan, Di Stefano & Abate	Late Triassic		Italy	A demosponge. Genus includes new species M. panormitana and M. reticulata.	
Neomonograptus aequabilis latus	Subsp. nov	Valid	Chen et al.	Early Devonian		China	A graptolite, a subspecies of Neomonograptus aequabilis.	
Noritubispongia	Gen. et 2 sp. nov	Valid	Senowbari-Daryan, Di Stefano & Abate	Late Triassic		Greece; Italy; Turkey	A demosponge belonging to the group Agelasida. The type species is N. chaetetiformis; genus also includes N. arcularia.	
Normalograptus frydai	Sp. nov	Valid	Štorch	Silurian		Czech Republic	A graptolite belonging to the family Normalograptidae, a species of Normalograptus.	
Normalograptus parvus	Sp. nov	Valid	Štorch	Silurian		Czech Republic	A graptolite belonging to the family Normalograptidae, a species of Normalograptus.	
Ottoia tricuspida	Sp. nov	Valid	Smith, Harvey & Butterfield	Cambrian	Burgess Shale	Canada	A stem-group priapulid, a species of Ottoia.	
Oymurania	Gen. et sp. nov	Valid	Ushatinskaya in Kouchinsky et al.	Cambrian		Russia; Morocco?	A stem-group brachiopod. The type species is Oymurania gravestocki from Siberian Platform; genus might also contain a second, yet-unnamed species from Morocco.	
Parastylothalamia minima	Sp. nov	Valid	Senowbari-Daryan, Link & Riedel	Late Triassic (Norian)		Turkey	A sponge, a species of Parastylothalamia.	
Pauxillites thaddei	Sp. nov	Valid	Valent & Carbacho	Ordovician (Floian)	Upper Fezouata Formation	Morocco	A member of Hyolitha (a group of animals of uncertain phylogenetic placement, possibly molluscs), a species of Pauxillites.	
Pernerograptus pribyli	Sp. nov	Valid	Štorch	Silurian		Czech Republic	A graptolite belonging to the family Monograptidae, a species of Pernerograptus.	
Polytubithalamia	Gen. et sp. nov	Valid	Senowbari-Daryan, Di Stefano & Abate	Late Triassic		Italy	A demosponge. Genus includes new species P. perforata.	
Preperonidella tabulata	Sp. nov	Valid	Senowbari-Daryan, Di Stefano & Abate	Late Triassic		Italy; Turkey	A demosponge belonging to the group Agelasida and the family Preperonidellidae.	
Protopholoe colombiana	Sp. nov	Valid	Luque, Hourdez & Vinn	Late Cretaceous (Coniacian)		Colombia	An aphroditiform polychaete, a species of Protopholoe.	
Pseudorthograptus mitchelli	Sp. nov	Valid	Štorch	Silurian		Czech Republic	A graptolite belonging to the family Retiolitidae, a species of Pseudorthograptus.	
Pustulispongia	Gen. et sp. nov	Valid	Senowbari-Daryan, Di Stefano & Abate	Late Triassic		Italy	A demosponge. Genus includes new species P. anulifera.	
Pyrgopolon (Septenaria) nekvasilovae	Sp. nov	Valid	Kočí & Jäger	Late Cretaceous (late Cenomanian)	Bohemian Cretaceous Basin	Czech Republic	A polychaete belonging to the family Serpulidae, a species of Pyrgopolon.	
Pyrgopolon (Septenaria) zitti	Sp. nov	Valid	Kočí & Jäger	Late Cretaceous (late Cenomanian)	Bohemian Cretaceous Basin	Czech Republic	A polychaete belonging to the family Serpulidae, a species of Pyrgopolon.	
Quasimolites	Gen. et sp. nov	Valid	Valent et al.	Cambrian	Buchava Formation	Czech Republic	A member of Hyolitha (a group of animals of uncertain phylogenetic placement, possibly molluscs). The type species is Quasimolites quasimodo.	
Rollinschaeta	Gen. et sp. nov	Valid	Parry et al.	Late Cretaceous (Cenomanian)		Lebanon	A polychaete belonging to the family Amphinomidae. The type species is Rollinschaeta myoplena.	
Rostrospongia	Gen. et sp. nov	Valid	Senowbari-Daryan, Di Stefano & Abate	Late Triassic		Italy	A demosponge. Genus includes new species R. magna.	
Sarmentofascis? digitatus	Sp. nov	Valid	Schlagintweit & Krajewski	Late Jurassic-Early Cretaceous (Tithonian-early Berriasian)		Crimean Peninsula	A cladocoropsid stromatoporoid sponge, possibly a species of Sarmentofascis.	
Scathascolex	Gen. et sp. nov	Valid	Smith	Cambrian	Burgess Shale	Canada	A palaeoscolecid worm. The type species is Scathascolex minor.	
Semiuvanella	Gen. et sp. nov	Valid	Senowbari-Daryan, Di Stefano & Abate	Late Triassic		Italy	A demosponge. Genus includes new species S. siciliana.	
Skryjelites	Gen. et sp. nov	Valid	Valent et al.	Cambrian	Buchava Formation	Czech Republic	A member of Hyolitha (a group of animals of uncertain phylogenetic placement, possibly molluscs). The type species is Skryjelites auritus.	
Sphenoecium wheelerensis	Sp. nov	Valid	Maletz & Steiner	Cambrian	Wheeler Shale	United States	A graptolite, a species of Sphenoecium.	
Stipesia	Gen. et sp. nov	Valid	Świerczewska-Gładysz	Late Cretaceous (early Campanian)		Poland	A lithistid demosponge belonging to the family Pleromidae. The type species is Stipesia belchatowiensis.	
Tenuipariespongia	Gen. et sp. nov	Valid	Senowbari-Daryan, Di Stefano & Abate	Late Triassic		Italy	A demosponge belonging to the group Agelasida. The type species is T. conica.	
Thaumactena	Gen. et sp. nov	Valid	Ou et al.	Early Cambrian	Heilinpu Formation	China	A comb jelly. The type species is Thaumactena ensis.	
Thylacocercus	Gen. et sp. nov	Valid	Conway Morris et al.	Cambrian	Wheeler Formation	United States	A vetulicystid deuterostome. The type species is Thylacocercus ignota.	
Trinakrispongia	Gen. et sp. nov	Valid	Senowbari-Daryan, Di Stefano & Abate	Late Triassic		Italy	A demosponge. Genus includes new species T. gracilis.	
Triplicatella papilio	Sp. nov	Valid	Kouchinsky in Kouchinsky et al.	Early Cambrian	Emyaksin Formation	Russia	A member of Hyolitha (a group of animals of uncertain phylogenetic placement, possibly molluscs), a species of Triplicatella.	
Uncinatograptus jadae	Sp. nov	Valid	Chen et al.	Early Devonian		China	A graptolite, a species of Uncinatograptus.	
Vesicotubispongia	Gen. et sp. nov	Valid	Senowbari-Daryan, Di Stefano & Abate	Late Triassic		Italy	A demosponge. Genus includes new species V. triasica.	
Wiwaxia herka	Sp. nov	Valid	Conway Morris et al.	Cambrian	Spence Shale	United States	A stem-lophotrochozoan, a species of Wiwaxia.	
Wiwaxia papilio	Sp. nov	Valid	Zhang et al.	Cambrian	Maotianshan Shales	China	A stem-lophotrochozoan, a species of Wiwaxia.	
Yuknessia stephenensis	Sp. nov	Valid	LoDuca et al.	Cambrian	Burgess Shale; Pierson Cove Formation; Spence Shale; Wheeler Shale	Canada; United States	A species of Yuknessia (originally thought to be an alga, reinterpreted as a member of Pterobranchia by LoDuca et al., 2015).	

== Other organisms ==
Name	Novelty	Status	Authors	Age	Unit	Location	Notes	Images
Actinella goodwinii	Sp. nov	Valid	Siver et al.	Eocene		Canada	A diatom, a species of Actinella.	
Actinella hickeyi	Sp. nov	Valid	Siver et al.	Eocene		Canada	A diatom, a species of Actinella.	
Actinella kimberlitica	Sp. nov	Valid	Siver et al.	Eocene		Canada	A diatom, a species of Actinella.	
Adeliesphaera	Gen. et sp. nov	Valid	Bijl & Brinkhuis	Early Eocene		Antarctica	A dinoflagellate. The type species is Adeliesphaera ohanlonii.	
Annulatubus	Gen. et sp. nov	Valid	Carbone et al.	Ediacaran	Blueflower Formation	Canada	A tubular organism of uncertain phylogenetic placement. The type species is Annulatubus flexuosus.	
Caledonicratis	Gen. et sp. nov	Valid	Zapalski & Clarkson	Carboniferous (Viséan)	Gullane Formation	United Kingdom	An organism of uncertain phylogenetic placement; possibly an animal belonging to the cnidarian family Solanderiidae (the possibility considered to be more probable by the authors of its description) or an alga similar to Perissothallus. The type species is Caledonicratis caridum.	
Callimothallus semicircularis	Sp. nov	Valid	Singh et al.	Early Eocene	Cambay Shale Formation	India	A fungal thallus similar to thalli of members of Microthyriaceae.	
Casparyotorula	Gen. et comb et sp. nov	Valid	Rikkinen, Schmidt & Kettunen in Kettunen et al.	Eocene		Germany; Russia (Kaliningrad Oblast)	A hyphomycete fungus known from Baltic amber and Bitterfeld amber. A new genus for "Torula" globulifera Caspary (1886); genus also contains "Torula" heteromorpha Caspary (1886), as well as the new species Casparyotorula arnoldii.	
Circulodinium? laeve	Sp. nov	Valid	Cheng et al.	Eocene	Anjihaihe Formation	China	A dinoflagellate, possibly a species of Circulodinium.	
Cyclostephanos nepalensis	Sp. nov	Valid	Hayashi in Hayashi & Tanimura	Pleistocene		Nepal	A diatom, a species of Cyclostephanos.	
Cyclostephanos pseudonepalensis	Sp. nov	Valid	Hayashi in Hayashi & Tanimura	Pleistocene		Nepal	A diatom, a species of Cyclostephanos.	
Cyclostephanos ramosus	Sp. nov	Valid	Hayashi & Tanimura	Pleistocene		Nepal	A diatom, a species of Cyclostephanos.	
Cyclotella paleo-ocellata	Sp. nov	Valid	Vossel & Van de Vijver in Vossel et al.	Holocene		Israel	A diatom. Originally described as a species of Cyclotella; transferred to the genus Lindavia by Nakov et al. (2015).	
Dictyosphaera tacita	Sp. nov	Valid	Tang et al.	Tonian	Gouhou Formation	China	An acritarch.	
Donskinica	Gen. nov	Valid	Strelnikova & Kozyrenko				A diatom.	
Elatera minor	Sp. nov	Valid	Vorob'eva & Sergeev in Vorob'eva, Sergeev & Petrov	Early Mesoproterozoic	Kotuikan Formation	Russia	A probable eukaryotic microorganism of uncertain phylogenetic placement	
Eosolena minuta	Sp. nov	Valid	Vorob'eva & Sergeev in Vorob'eva, Sergeev & Petrov	Early Mesoproterozoic	Kotuikan Formation	Russia	A probable eukaryotic microorganism of uncertain phylogenetic placement.	
Gigantosphaeridium	Gen. et sp. nov	Valid	Agić, Moczydłowska & Yin	Late Mesoproterozoic	Baicaoping Formation	China	A microfossil belonging to the stem group of Chloroplastida. Genus includes new species G. fibratum.	
Haslea antiqua	Sp. nov	Valid	Fenner	Paleocene		Southwestern Pacific Ocean (Campbell Plateau)	A diatom, a species of Haslea.	
Hirudiforma	Gen. et 2 sp. nov	Valid	Vorob'eva & Sergeev in Vorob'eva, Sergeev & Petrov	Early Mesoproterozoic	Kotuikan Formation	Russia	A eukaryotic microorganism, possibly a green alga. The type species is H. simmetrica; genus also includes H. lancetica.	
Kaiwaradinium abbreviatum	Sp. nov	Valid	Cheng et al.	Eocene	Anjihaihe Formation	China	A dinoflagellate, a species of Kaiwaradinium.	
Kuckaraukia	Gen. et sp. nov	Valid	Ivantsov, Novikov & Razumovskiy in Razumovskiy et al.	Late Vendian	Basa Formation	Russia	An organism of uncertain phylogenetic placement, might be a unitary organism or as a colony of motionless benthic organisms. The type species is Kuckaraukia multituberculata.	
Lineaforma	Gen. et sp. nov	Disputed	Vorob'eva & Sergeev in Vorob'eva, Sergeev & Petrov	Early Mesoproterozoic	Belt Supergroup; Kotuikan Formation; Roper Group	Australia; Russia; United States	A probable eukaryotic microorganism of uncertain phylogenetic placement. The type species is L. elongata. Possibly a junior synonym of Jixiania lineata.	
Mallomonas schumachii	Sp. nov	Valid	Siver	Eocene		Canada	A synurophyte, a species of Mallomonas.	
Matris	Gen. et sp. nov		Du, Wang & Komiya	Ediacaran	Doushantuo Formation	China	An organism of uncertain phylogenetic placement. Its fossil were originally interpreted as a probable sponge gemmules; this interpretation was criticized by Pronzato, Pisera & Manconi (2017), who stated that the fossils resemble some arcellid testate amoebae. Genus includes new species M. gemmuleanalogi.	
Meliolinites buxi	Sp. nov	Valid	Ma & Sun in Ma et al.	Oligocene	Ningming Formation	China	A fungus belonging to the family Meliolaceae; a species of Meliolinites.	
Notothyrites undulatus	Sp. nov	Valid	Singh et al.	Early Eocene	Cambay Shale Formation	India	A fungal thallus similar to thalli of members of Microthyriaceae.	
Oligosphaeropsis	Gen. et 3 sp. nov	Valid	Cheng et al.	Eocene	Anjihaihe Formation	China	A dinoflagellate. The type species is Oligosphaeropsis accreta; genus also contains Oligosphaeropsis complex and Oligosphaeropsis megaprocessa.	
Palaeoborrelia	Gen. et sp. nov	Valid	Poinar	Miocene		Dominican Republic	A spirochaete belonging to the family Spirochaetaceae known from Dominican amber. The type species is Palaeoborrelia dominicana.	
Palaeoclaviceps	Gen. et sp. nov	Valid	Poinar, Alderman & Wunderlich	Cretaceous (roughly 100 million years ago)		Myanmar	A fungus belonging to the family Clavicipitaceae (a relative of ergots). The type species is Palaeoclaviceps parasiticus.	
Palaeorickettsia	Gen. et sp. nov	Valid	Poinar	Early Cretaceous (late Albian)		Myanmar	Probably a member of Rickettsiales. The type species is Palaeorickettsia protera.	
Palaeozoosporites	Gen. et sp. nov	Valid	Strullu-Derrien in Strullu-Derrien et al.	Devonian (approximately 407 Mya)		United Kingdom	A chytrid-like (i.e. similar to members of Blastocladiomycota and Chytridiomycota) fungus of uncertain phylogenetic placement. The type species is Palaeozoosporites renaultii.	
Rajkanella	Gen. et sp. nov	Valid	Schlagintweit & Rigaud	Late Cretaceous (Cenomanian)		Kosovo	A foraminifer. Genus includes new species R. hottingerinaformis.	
Rhoicosphenia gandhii	Sp. nov	Valid	Thomas, Karthick & Kociolek in Thomas, Kociolek & Karthick	Probably Pliocene or Pleistocene		India	A diatom, a species of Rhoicosphenia.	
Rhoicosphenia indica	Sp. nov	Valid	Thomas, Karthick & Kociolek in Thomas, Kociolek & Karthick	Probably Pliocene or Pleistocene		India	A diatom, a species of Rhoicosphenia.	
Rhoicosphenia patrickae	Sp. nov	Valid	Thomas & Kociolek in Thomas, Kociolek & Karthick	Probably Pliocene or Pleistocene		United States	A diatom, a species of Rhoicosphenia.	
Rhoicosphenia reimeri	Sp. nov	Valid	Thomas & Kociolek in Thomas, Kociolek & Karthick	Probably Pliocene or Pleistocene		United States	A diatom, a species of Rhoicosphenia.	
Rhyniosarcina	Gen. et sp. nov	Valid	Taylor & Krings	Early Devonian		United Kingdom	A member of Cyanobacteria, probably a member or a relative of Chroococcales. The type species is Rhyniosarcina devonica.	
Scepasmatocarpion	Gen. et sp. nov	Valid	Krings & Taylor	Early Devonian		United Kingdom	A fungus of uncertain phylogenetic placement. The type species is Scepasmatocarpion fenestrulatum.	
Sekwitubulus	Gen. et sp. nov	Valid	Carbone et al.	Ediacaran	Blueflower Formation	Canada	A tubular organism of uncertain phylogenetic placement. The type species is Sekwitubulus annulatus.	
Sinotubulites hexagonus	Sp. nov	Valid	Cai et al.	Late Ediacaran	Dengying Formation	China	A tubular organism of uncertain phylogenetic placement, of probable animal affinities; a species of Sinotubulites.	
Sinotubulites pentacarinalis	Sp. nov	Valid	Cai et al.	Late Ediacaran	Dengying Formation	China	A tubular organism of uncertain phylogenetic placement, of probable animal affinities; a species of Sinotubulites.	
Sinotubulites triangularis	Sp. nov	Valid	Cai et al.	Late Ediacaran	Dengying Formation	China	A tubular organism of uncertain phylogenetic placement, of probable animal affinities; a species of Sinotubulites.	
Spiniferites adnatus latispinus	Subsp. nov	Valid	Cheng et al.	Eocene	Anjihaihe Formation	China	A dinoflagellate, a subspecies of Spiniferites adnatus.	
Squamosphaera	Gen. et comb. nov	Valid	Tang et al.	Mesoproterozoic and Neoproterozoic	Gouhou Formation; Kwagunt Formation; Zigazino-Komarovsk Beds	Australia; China; Russia; United States	An acritarch. The type species is "Satka" colonialica Jankauskas (1979).	
Tertiarius juriljii	Sp. nov	Valid	Ognjanova-Rumenova et al.	Pliocene	Vitacevo Formation	Macedonia	A diatom; a species of Tertiarius.	
Tertiarius mariovensis	Sp. nov	Valid	Ognjanova-Rumenova et al.	Pliocene	Vitacevo Formation	Macedonia	A diatom; a species of Tertiarius.	
Tianshandinium	Gen. et sp. nov	Valid	Cheng et al.	Eocene	Anjihaihe Formation	China	A dinoflagellate. The type species is Tianshandinium biconicum.	
Turbiosphaera guersteinae	Sp. nov	Valid	Bijl & Brinkhuis	Early Eocene		Antarctica	A dinoflagellate, a species of Turbiosphaera.	

== See also ==
- Dawn of Humanity (2015 PBS film)
