= Eohadrotreta =

Eohadrotreta Temporal range: Cambrian Stage 2

Scientific classification
- Kingdom: Animalia
- Phylum: Brachiopoda
- Class: Lingulata
- Order: †Acrotretida
- Family: †Acrotretidae
- Genus: †Eohadrotreta; Li and Holmer, 2004

Type species
- Eohadrotreta zhenbaensis Li and Holmer, 2004

Other species
- Eohadrotreta zhujiahensis Li and Holmer, 2004

Extinct genus of acrotretoid brachiopod

Eohadrotreta is an extinct genus of acrotretoid brachiopod that lived during Cambrian Series 2.

== Distribution ==
Fossils of Eohadrotreta zhenbaensis are known from both Antarctica and China.

== Palaeobiology ==
=== Life history ===
During its larval stage, Eohadrotreta had a bivalved protegulum. It metamorphosed by shedding the larval setae and developing a metamorphic shell.
