= Acrotretoidea =

Acrotretoidea Temporal range: Lower Cambrian – Devonian

Scientific classification
- Domain: Eukaryota
- Kingdom: Animalia
- Phylum: Brachiopoda
- Class: Lingulata
- Order: †Acrotretida
- Superfamily: †Acrotretoidea

Families
- Acrotretidae; Curticiidae; Torynelasmatidae; Eoconulidae; Ceratretidae; Ephippelasmatidae; Scaphelasmatidae; Biernatidae

Superfamily of marine lamp shells

Acrotretoidea is a superfamily of brachiopods containing the following families:

| Family | Number of genera | Fossil range |
|---|---|---|
| Acrotretidae | 55 | Lower Cambrian – Silurian |
| Curticiidae | 1 | Middle – Upper Cambrian |
| Torynelasmatidae | 9 | Ordovician (Arenig) – Silurian |
| Eoconulidae | 3 | Ordovician (Arenig – Ashgill) |
| Ceratretidae | 8 | Lower – Upper Cambrian |
| Ephippelasmatidae | 12 | Upper Cambrian – Ordovician |
| Scaphelasmatidae | 6 | Middle Cambrian - Upper Silurian |
| Biernatidae | 5 | Lower Ordovician – Middle Devonian |
