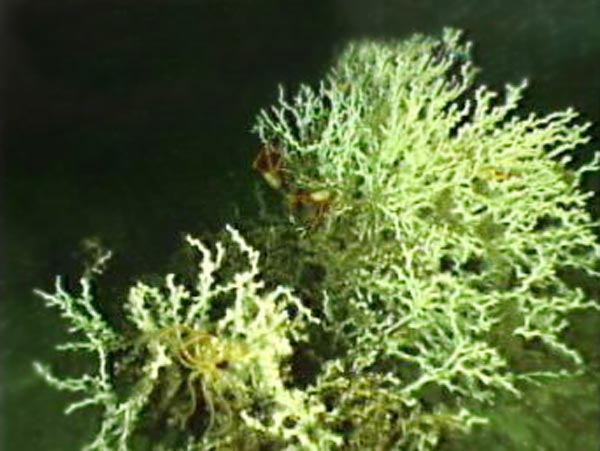
- Lophelia pertusa

Scientific classification
- Kingdom: Animalia
- Phylum: Cnidaria
- Subphylum: Anthozoa
- Class: Hexacorallia
- Order: Scleractinia
- Suborder: Caryophylliina

= Caryophylliina =

Suborder of corals

Caryophylliina is a suborder of stony corals, order Scleractinia.

== List of families ==
- Caryophylliidae Dana, 1846
- Flabellidae Bourne, 1905
- Gardineriidae Stolarski, 1996
- Guyniidae Hickson, 1910
- Turbinoliidae Milne-Edwards and Haime, 1848
