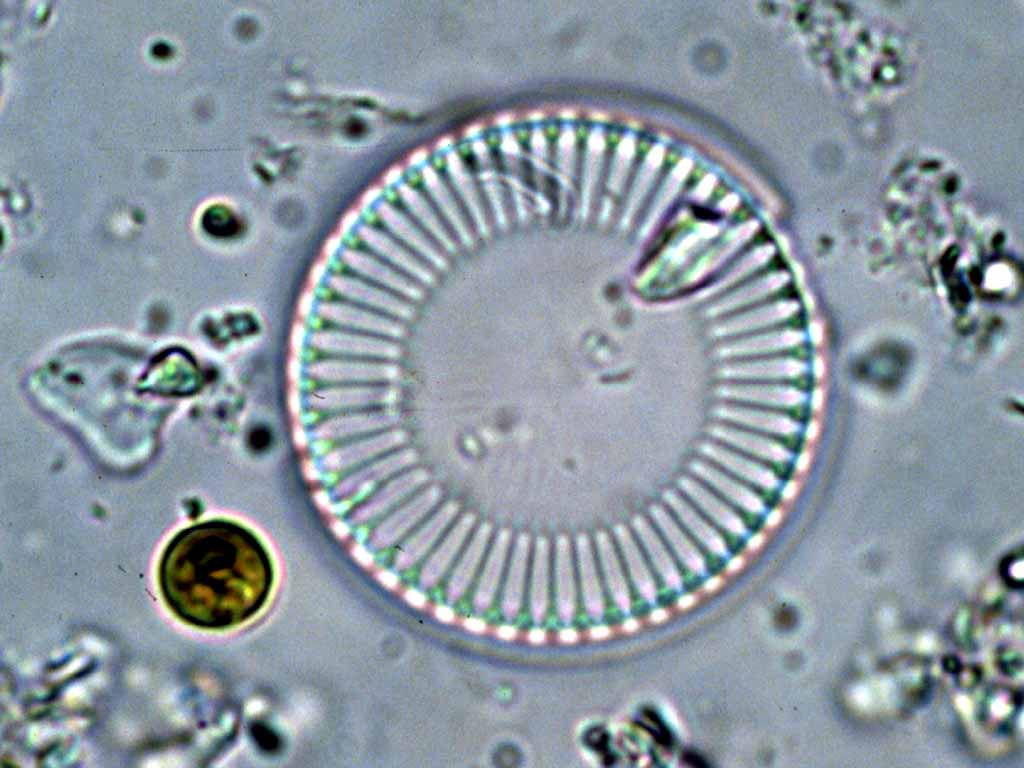
- Cyclotella meneghiniana

Scientific classification
- Domain: Eukaryota
- Clade: Sar
- Clade: Stramenopiles
- Division: Ochrophyta
- Clade: Bacillariophyta
- Class: Thalassiosirophyceae
- Order: Thalassiosirales
- Family: Thalassiosiraceae
- Genus: Cyclotella (Kützing) Brébisson

Type species
- Cyclotella tecta Håkansson & R.Ross

= Cyclotella =

Genus of diatoms

Cyclotella is a genus of diatoms often found in oligotrophic environments, both marine and fresh water. It is in the family Stephanodiscaceae and the order Thalassiosirales. The genus was first discovered in the mid-1800s and since then has become an umbrella genus for over 100 different species, the most well-studied and the best known being Cyclotella meneghiniana. Despite being among the most dominant genera in low-productivity environments, it is relatively understudied.

Cyclotella's habitat has traditionally been described as low-productivity mesotrophic or oligotrophic freshwater environments. However, it is unclear whether there is an archetypal aquatic setting for this genus as some species are more cosmopolitan, such as C. meneghiniana, which occurs in warm, nutrient-rich environments as well as low-productivity environments.

== Etymology ==
The name Cyclotella is derived from the Greek term kyklos, meaning "circle." While "circle" can be used to describe many diatoms, Cyclotella spp. are all circular and have a girdle band arrangement that makes the structure of the organism resemble a wheel.

== History ==
The genus Cyclotella was described in 1838 by Louis Alphonse de Brébisson, a French botanist and photographer. Brébisson shares the credit of discovering the genus with Friedrich Traugott Kützing, a German pharmacist, botanist, and phycologist. This is in spite of the fact that neither one of these scientists ever worked together or even came in contact with one another. In 1849, Kützing published a comprehensive work describing 6000 different algae species, including the most known species of Cyclotella today, C. meneghiniana.

Brébisson describes in the 1838 publication Flore de Normandie, Cyclotella "has a more or less elongated ovoid shape, it is swollen from both sides, and when its center is diaphanous, it resembles two tubular frustules united by their vertices ( translated from French )." Upon distinguishing Cyclotella from other diatom species, there have been over 100 different species of the genus described and taxonomically accepted.

Recent study has separated multiple genera from within Cyclotella, including Cyclostephanos, Discostella and Lindavia. Currently, there are 129 recognized species of Cyclotella and 72 species with uncertain status, but currently placed in Cyclotella. Cyclotella may still be an unnatural group (i.e. polyphyletic or paraphyletic).

== Habitat and ecology ==
Species of Cyclotella are most often found in oligotrophic (nutrient poor) environments. They are most often found in freshwater environments, but can also be found in brackish and marine habitats as well. Many of the freshwater species have been found throughout the United States in stagnant waters. Species that are most commonly found in marine environments are C. caspia, C. litoralis, C. meneghiniana, C. striata, and C. stylorwn.

In a study performed in 1974, it was determined that the optimal osmolar concentration for growth in C. meneghiniana in a medium of 0.5 Osm/L. For references, the osmolarity of seawater is on average, 1 Osm/L. Marine diatoms and algae in general tend to flourish in higher osmolar concentrations due to the increased presence of carbon dioxide and nutrients to be utilized as sustenance, but the low-solute environment Schobert found to be most optimal for the growth of C. meneghiana is consistent with most Cyclotella being found in low-productivity mesotrophic to oligotrophic environments. Species of cyclotella have been found in harsh aquatic environments such as coldwater regions in northern regions of the world.

Another study by Van de Vijver and Dessein found a new species of Cyclotella, C. deceusteriana, in the sub-antarctic region. One of the only ecological characteristics of Cyclotella that is consistent among most of its species is the fact that they are found in stagnant or near-stagnant waters and are immobile. Beyond that, there is a great deal of variation. Many of the Cyclotella species that have been studied have been shown to be found in aquatic environments that are either slightly or highly alkaline. C. distinguenda is known to prefer alkaline waters, and C. gamma has been found in lakes that have a pH range of 7.2 to 7.8. Nutrient concentration in the habitats of Cyclotella spp. varies. C. sensulato has been described as a dominant member of both mesotrophic and oligotrophic environments, as many are, but both C. atomus and C. meneghiniana are found to prefer nutrient-rich environments. Temperature ranges vary between species as well; it was mentioned earlier that C. deceusteriana was discovered in sub-antarctic regions, and C. gamma and C.quillensis have been found in the Northern United States and Saskatchewan, respectively. C. atomus, on the other hand, has been found in warmer lake sediments in California. Colonization patterns of Cyclotella spp. are relatively uniform, in the sense that most of them are solitary organisms. C. meneghiniana, however, has been described to occasionally live in colonies. Of course, the preference of nutrient rich environments of C. meneghiniana conflicts the findings mentioned earlier.

== Morphology ==
The size of Cyclotella varies by species. C. atomus has a diameter of 5-7 μm, whereas C. quillensis can have a diameter up to 24-54 μm. The most studied species of the genus, C. meneghiniana, has a diameter of 6-18 μm. Like all other diatoms, Cyclotella spp. have transparent cell walls. They form biosilica shells using dissolved silicon and carbon acquired from various carbon partitioning pathways.

Other materials Cyclotella spp. use for cell wall biosynthesis are semiconductor metal oxides and extracellular fibers made of chitin. The primary allomorph of chitin that is found most often in diatoms is α-chitin, but Cyclotella and Thalassiosira contain the β-chitin allomorph. Poly N-acetyl glucosamine chains are oriented in a parallel manner and contain intermolecular hydrogen bonds.

The bond chains and hydrogen bonds between molecules form a paracrystalline matrix of β-chitin. This matrix contains pores large enough for whatever solvent is available in the aquatic ecosystem in which Cyclotella spp. reside in to enter the matrix and swell the structure.

Diatoms are unique in the sense that they have valves, created by the two halves of a diatom's test. Cyclotella spp. are no exception, as they form the upper and lower portions of the wall. The girdle bands that support the valves are thin strips of silica and ultimately circumscribe the cell. Each valve has two central tubes traversing its surface, meeting in the middle at the central nodule. The morphology of the Cyclotella cell wall and its valves are important traits that distinguish species from each other. Each species has tangentially undulated valves all throughout their cell wall, regardless of their length, width, and concentration. Frustules contain areolas, that is orifices that mediate the passage of nutrients and exudates across the cell wall for sustenance. The characteristics of these areolas are thought to cause differences in mechanical strength and metabolism among different cells.

Like other monoraphid diatoms, Cyclotella frustules can be characterized as heterovalvar. The cell wall and cell membrane are what are known to this point as what distinguishes Cyclotella from other diatom genera. The cytoplasmic components are assumed to be similar to what other diatoms have. In C. meneghiniana, there are granules scattered and attached at the chromatophore all throughout the cytoplasm. The genus is photosynthetic like all other diatoms, so all species contain one or many pyrenoids traversed by a thylakoid membrane and a chloroplast within the endoplasmic reticulum.

Dictyosomes are also present in the cytoplasm, being in close proximity to the nucleus and making up the golgi complex. The nucleus has been found to change locations in C. meneghiniana throughout generations as a result of the cell diameter gradually decreasing.

== Life cycle ==
Cyclotella meneghiniana divide into two daughter cells during asexual reproduction. The halves are separated by the distinction between the two valves for each cell. Each of the two offspring that arise as a result of cell division have one of the two valves from the parent cell. During the separation of the parent cell, the cytoplasm forms the two offspring valves that will end up complementing the inherited parent valves in the offspring once reproduction is complete.

The offspring valves are formed within a silica deposition vesicle that gradually grows larger and separates into two different offspring valves. The parent valves become a template for the offspring valves being formed, with patterns of striae and the central cell area also being inherited. However, perfect complementation does not occur every generation, which can lead to consecutive generations inheriting a deformed parental valve that was initially a deformed offspring valve in a previous generation. The likeness of the offspring valves to the parental valves is determined by the flexibility of the girdle bands; the other factors are unknown. Vegetative cell division occurs over hundreds of generations for C. meneghiniana, with the cell diameters of the offspring organisms becoming gradually smaller. Regardless of the flexibility of the girdle bands and functionality of vegetative cell division, there is a point where the diameter of C. meneghiniana offspring dips below a certain threshold diameter. It has been observed that at this point, species-specific environmental stimuli induces the change from asexual reproduction to sexual reproduction.

Sexual reproduction occurs with gametes being formed upon reaching the threshold. During the process of meiosis, male Cyclotella cells release sperm and the female Cyclotella cells develop and egg from within the two valves. Following fertilization of the egg, a zygote is formed from the union of the two gametes. The zygote then develops into an auxophore (2n). Once sexual reproduction is complete, the diameter of the offspring is larger and beyond the threshold once again, allowing for the production of another few hundred generations through the asexual division of auxophores.

== Biochemistry ==
Despite there being very little known about the internal morphology of Cyclotella, there have been a sizable number of studies done on the genus' molecular biology and genome. C. cryptica has been identified to be an oleaginous diatom, with a great deal of triacylglycerols. Its genome has been identified to contain many methylated repetitive sequences, which are supposed to function as a way of limiting the occurrences of DNA transposition. C. cryptica was discovered to have a very efficient lipid metabolism, which is needed for its high triacylglycerol production.

Another study conducted in 1992 indicates that C. meninghiana has the largest chloroplast genome and abundance of sequence repeats of any diatom species up to this specific study. The C. meninghiana chloroplast genome alone has a vast amount of equimolar inversion isomers. Many of these isomers differ in their orientation to their single copy sequence counterparts. The species, according to the findings, still has some prokaryotic and land plant gene clusters as well as operons. In comparison to many other diatoms and plant chloroplast studies, C. meninghiana has a diversely rearranged gene order for single copy regions in its genome.

The draft nuclear genome of Cyclotella cryptica strain CCMP332 is 171 Mb long.

== Fossil records ==
Fossils of Cyclotella are not commonly discovered, however there have been a few species found fossilized in freshwater ecosystems. Fossil assemblages have been found in glacial and interglacial segments in oligotrophic and mesotrophic rivers in Europe and Mediterranean regions.

A sample of C. distinguenda was found at the Agios Floros fen, in Southwest Peloponnese, Greece. The fossilized sample was dated to 5700 to 5300 years ago. Support for the recognition of a new diatom species, C. paradistinguenda, was proposed after looking through the sample of C. distinguenda. C. paradistinguenda was dated back to 4600 years ago. Distinctions between the two species can also be described in the differences in stratigraphic distributions between the two, as C. paradistinguenda was found in an upper organic sequence of the sample compared to C. distinguenda.

Another sample of Cyclotella was found at Lake Petén-Itzá, lowland Guatemala. The newfound diatom species were found fossilized morphologically distinct from other Cyclotella species C. petenensis and C. cassandrae. The age of the samples these species came from were dated to 17,000 to 60,000 years ago.
