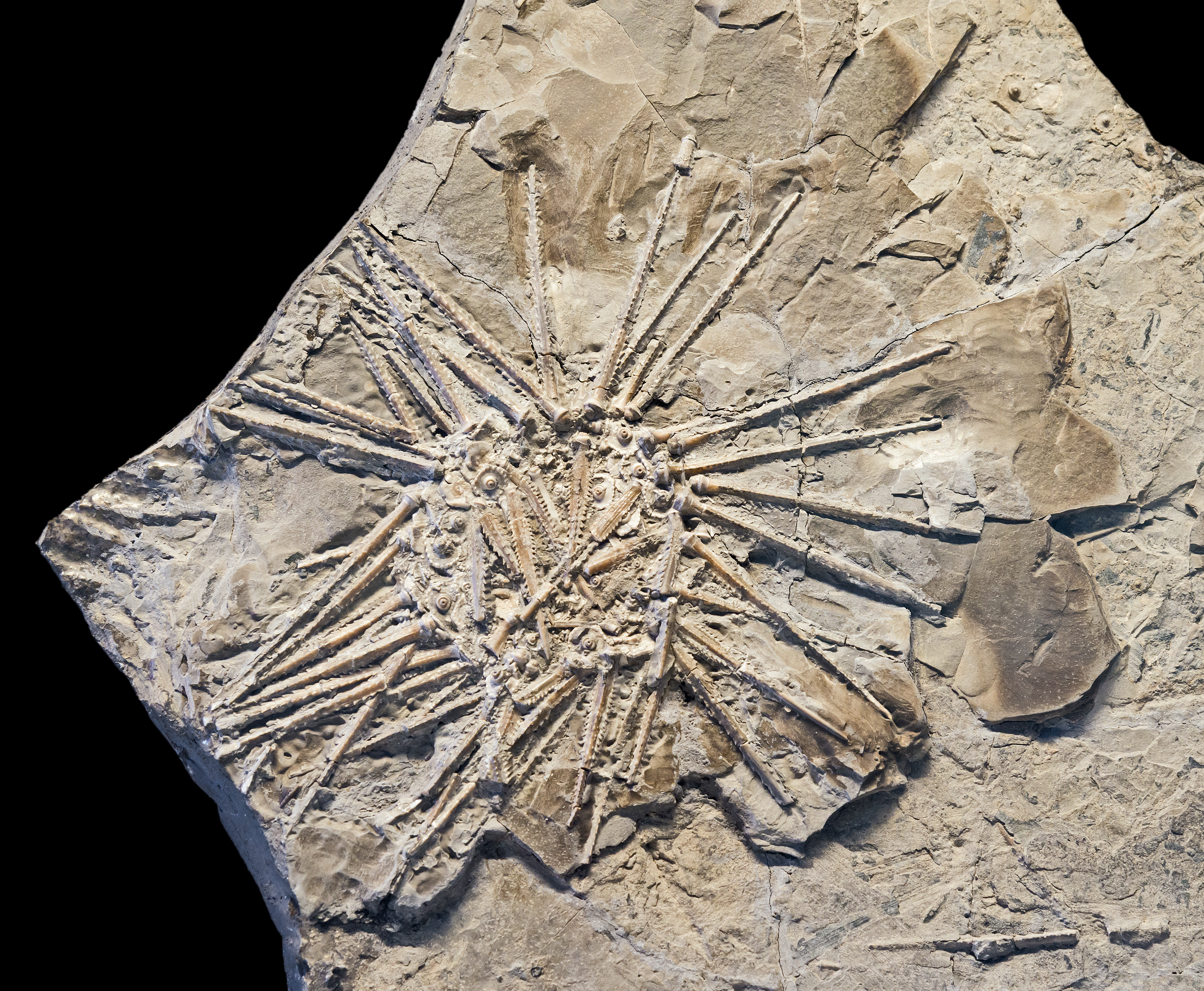
- Archaeocidaris brownwoodensis

Scientific classification
- Kingdom: Animalia
- Phylum: Echinodermata
- Class: Echinoidea
- Order: Cidaroida
- Family: Archaeocidaridae
- Genus: Archaeocidaris McCoy, 1844

= Archaeocidaris =

Archaeocidaris Temporal range: Late Devonian-Late Permian

Extinct genus of sea urchins

Archaeocidaris is an extinct genus of echinoid that lived from the Late Devonian to the Late Permian. Its remains have been found in Africa, Europe, and North America.

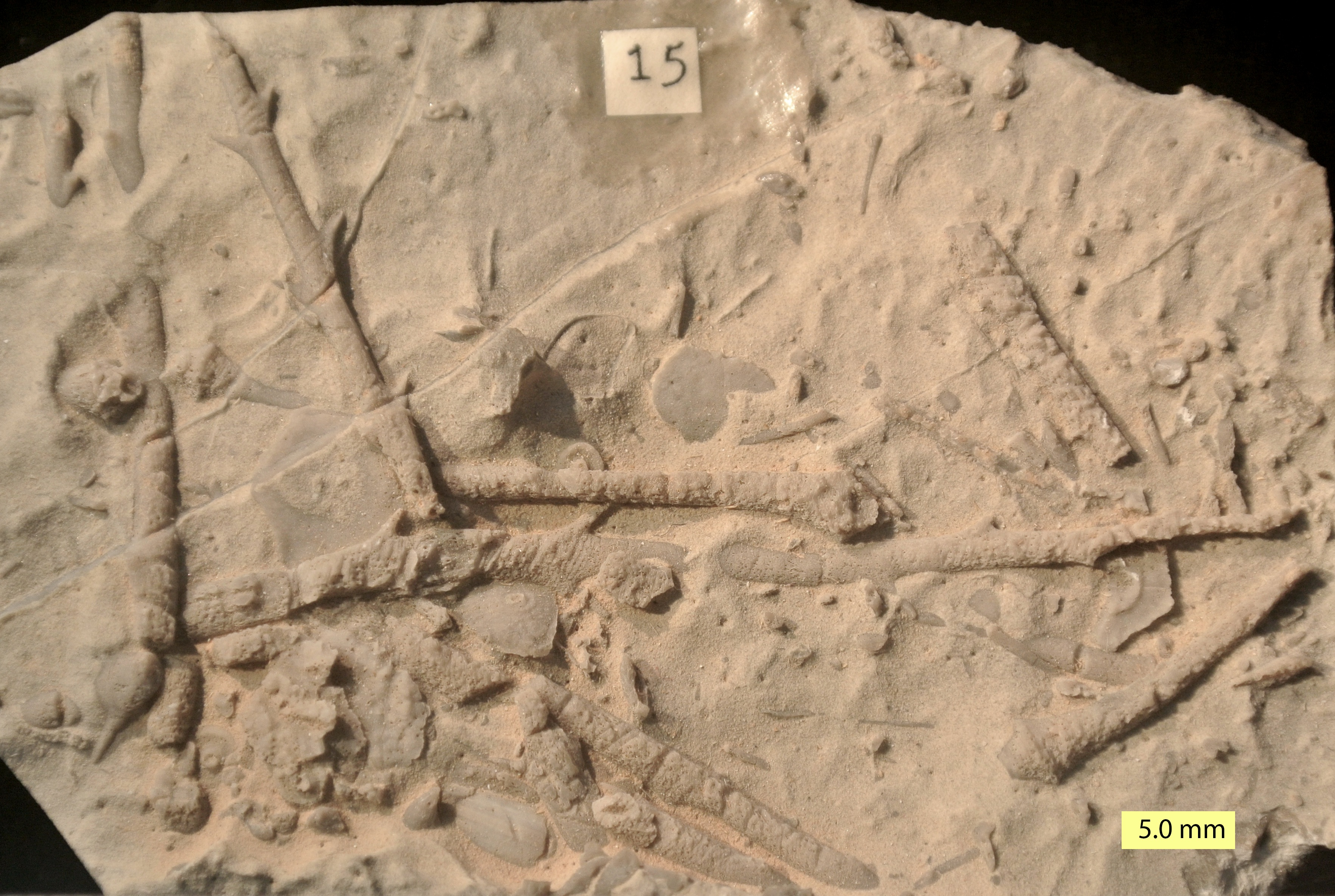
Archaeocidaris plates and spines from the Bird Spring Formation (Carboniferous) exposed in Kyle Canyon, Spring Mountains, southern Nevada.
