= Kuckaraukia =

Scientific classification
- Kingdom: Animalia
- Genus: †Kuckaraukia; Ivantsov, Novikov et Razumovskiy, 2015
- Species: †K. multituberculata

Binomial name
- †Kuckaraukia multituberculata Ivantsov, Novikov et Razumovskiy, 2015

Genus of enigmatic Ediacaran biota

Kuckaraukia is a genus of enigmatic Ediacaran organisms known from fossil casts of a disc-shaped biogenic structure interpreted as bifoliate, with a structured bottom layer and a less resistant top layer. It is unknown if the fossils represent single animals or a colonial organism of some kind.
