= Strophalosiidina =

Scientific classification
- Domain: Eukaryota
- Kingdom: Animalia
- Phylum: Brachiopoda
- Class: †Strophomenata
- Order: †Productida
- Suborder: †Strophalosiidina

Suborder of marine lamp shells

Strophalosiidina is a suborder of Brachiopod containing the families:

- Superfamily Strophalosioidea
  - Family Strophalosiidae
  - Family Chonopectidae
  - Family Araksalosiidae
- Superfamily Aulostegoidea
  - Family Aulostegidae
  - Family Cooperinidae
  - Family Scacchinellidae
- Superfamily Richthofenioidea
  - Family Richthofeniidae
  - Family Hercosiidae
  - Family Cyclacanthariidae
  - Family Gemmellaroiidae
