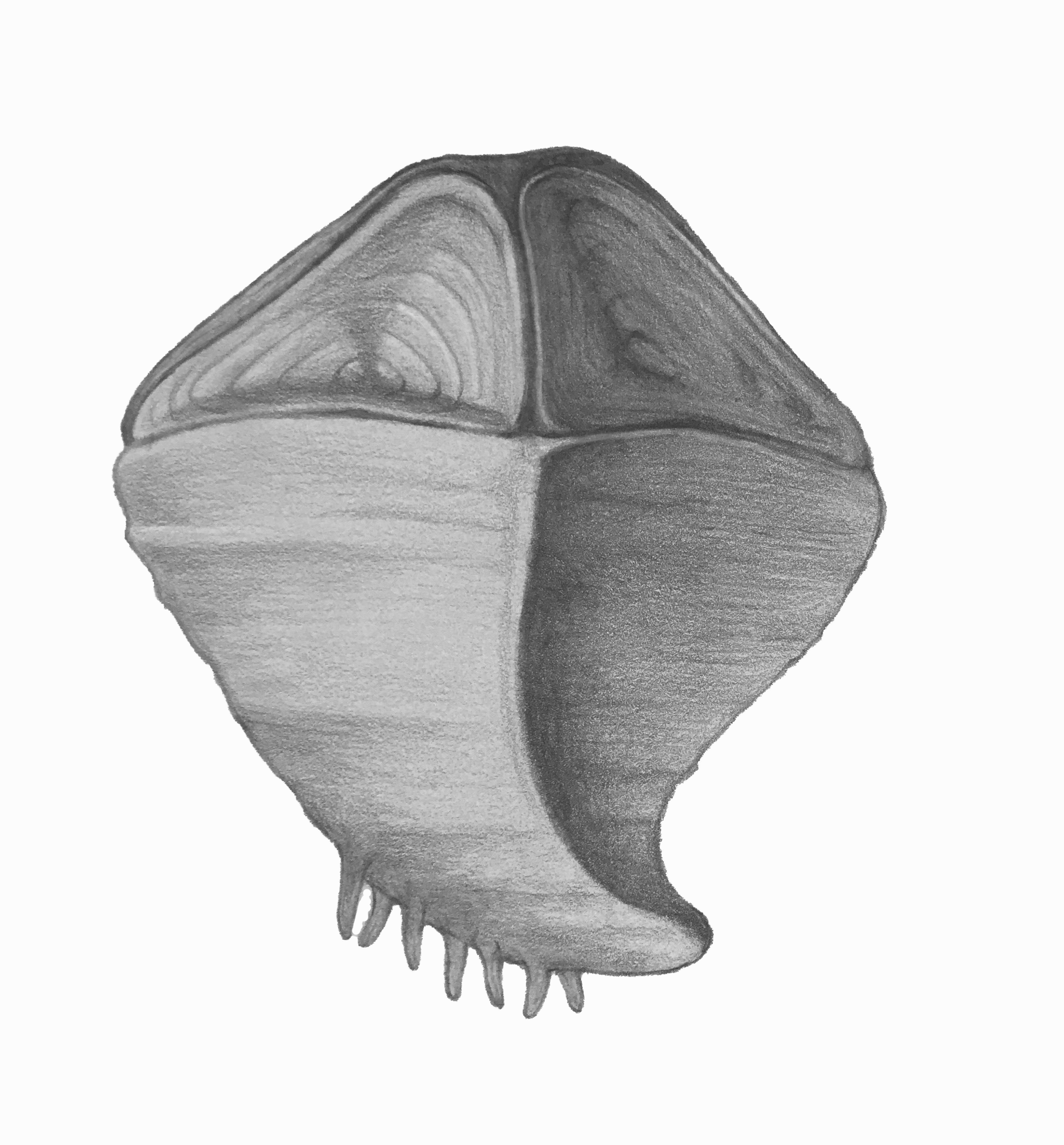
- Goniophyllum pyramidale

Scientific classification
- Kingdom: Animalia
- Phylum: Cnidaria
- Subphylum: Anthozoa
- Class: †Rugosa
- Order: †Cystiphyllida
- Family: †Goniophyllidae
- Genus: †Goniophyllum; Milne-Edwards et Haime, 1851

Species
- See species

= Goniophyllum =

Goniophyllum Temporal range: Wenlock–Pridoli

Extinct genus of corals

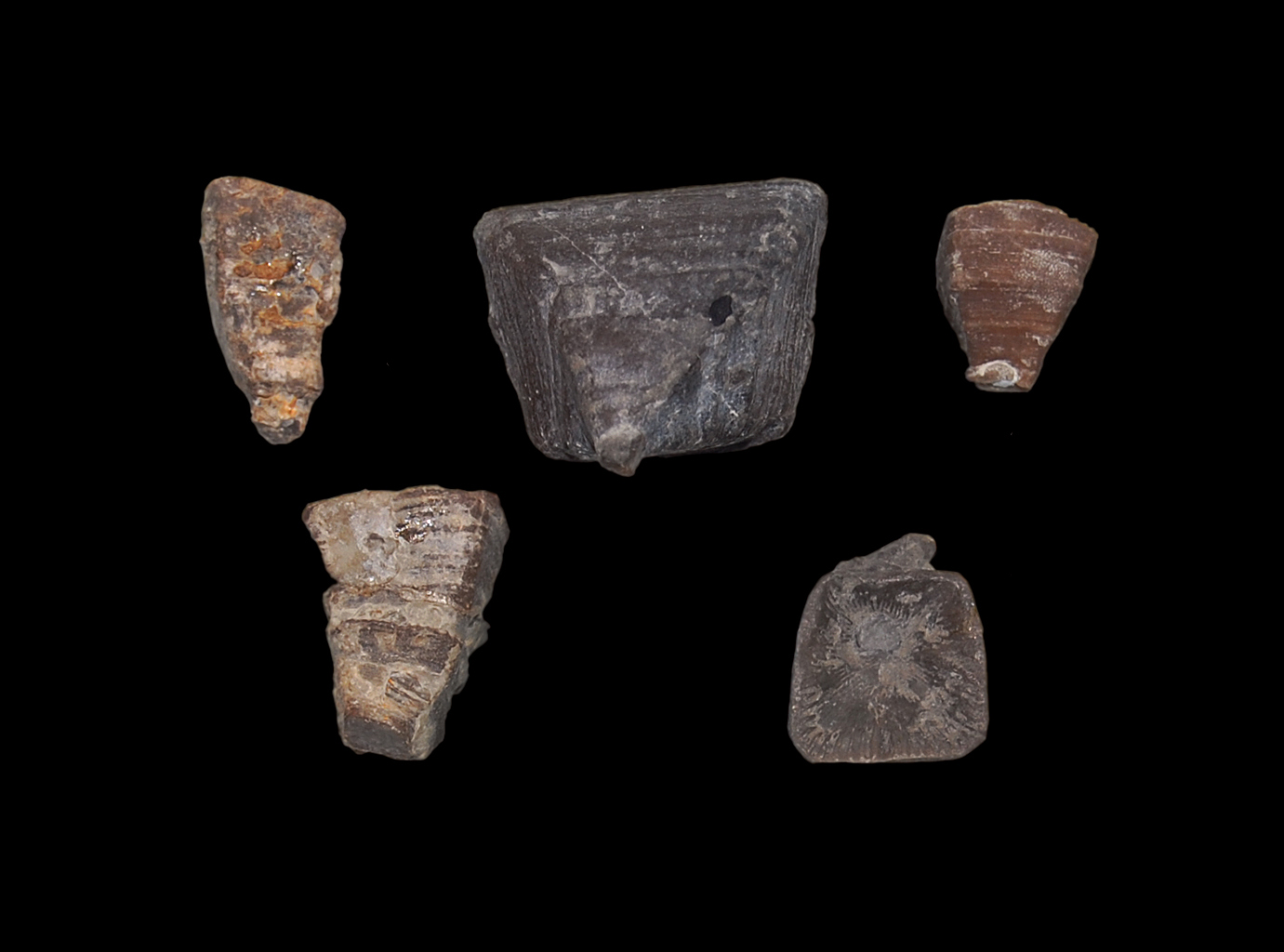
Goniophyllum pyramidale

Goniophyllum is an Silurian genus of rugose coral known from Sweden, Norway, Canada, the United Kingdom and the United States. It is easily identified by its "lids" and distinct square shape. The genus was described by Milne-Edwards et Haime in 1851.

== Description ==
The corallite is simple and square shaped. Growth segments are clearly visible. The calyx is deep with weak septa, but some are thicker and more distinguished than others. Four "lids" called opercula create a pyramid over the calyx that could be opened in life. These lids are triangular with distinct lingual and labial ornamentation. Muscle scars and a stolon tube is found on the inside of each operculum. One of the lids is slightly larger than the others and it's the only one that is pressant in related genera such as Rhizophyllum. The corals internal Tabulae is very well developed much like other members of Cystiphyllida.

== Species ==
- Goniophyllum fletcheri Milne-Edwards et Haime, 1851
- Goniophyllum osloense Johannessen, 2015
- Goniophyllum pyramidale Hisinger, 1831
