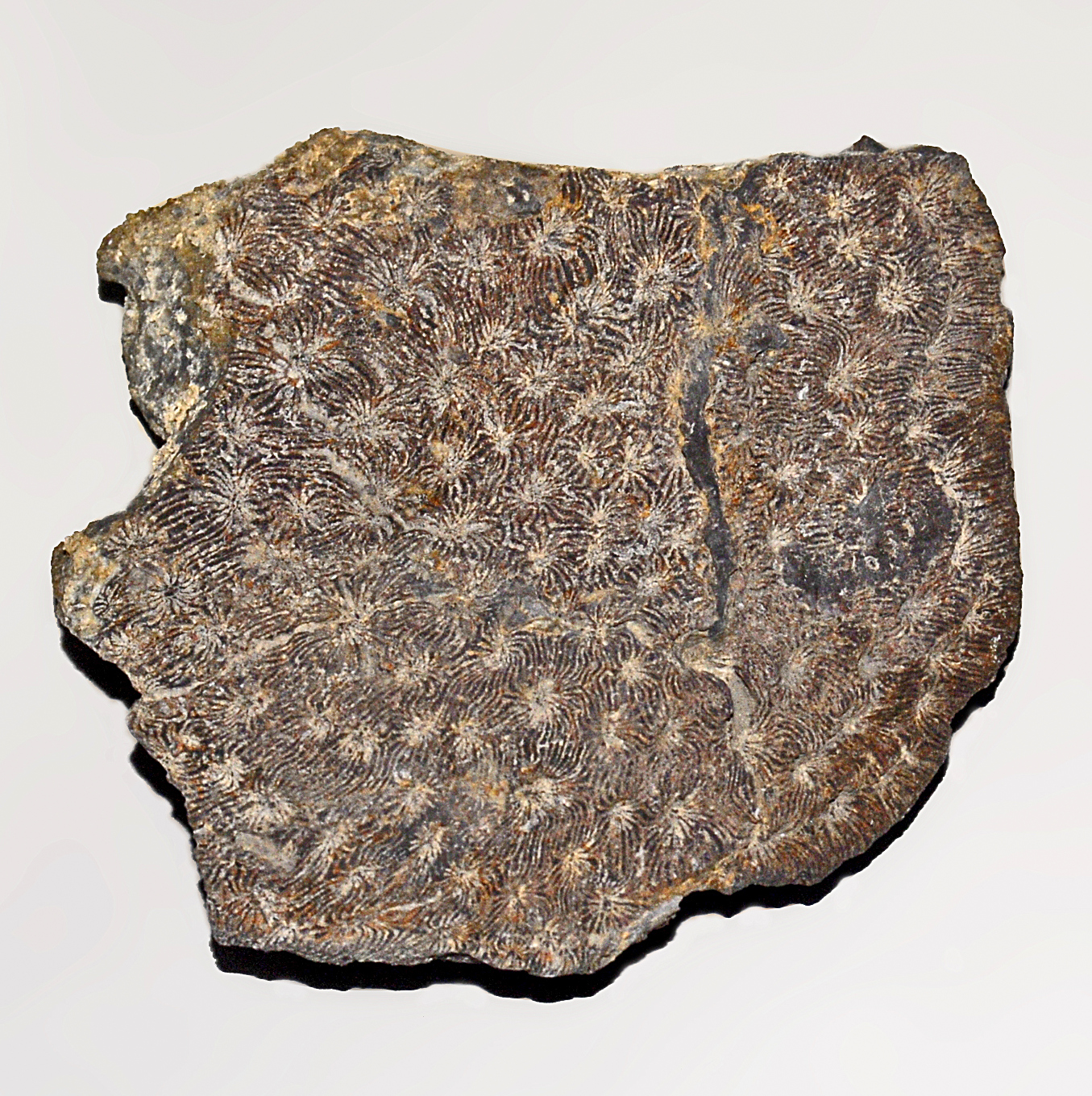
- Thamnasteria from Rhaetian of Italy, on display at the Museo Civico di Storia Naturale of Lecco

Scientific classification
- Kingdom: Animalia
- Phylum: Cnidaria
- Subphylum: Anthozoa
- Class: Hexacorallia
- Order: Scleractinia
- Suborder: Fungiina
- Family: †Thamnasteriidae; Vaughan and Wells, 1943

Genera
- See text

= Thamnasteriidae =

Extinct family of corals

Thamnasteriidae is a family of stony corals which became extinct in the Mesozoic.
