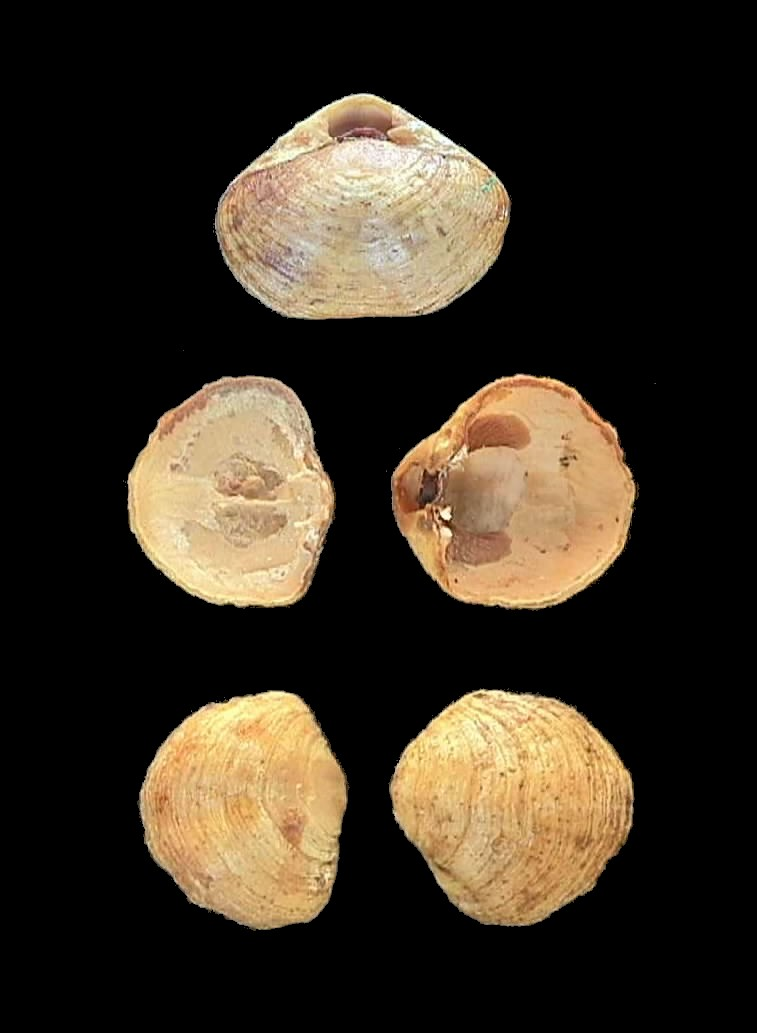
- Terebratella sanguinea

Scientific classification
- Domain: Eukaryota
- Kingdom: Animalia
- Phylum: Brachiopoda
- Class: Rhynchonellata
- Order: Terebratulida
- Suborder: Terebratellidina

Superfamilies
- See text

= Terebratellidina =

Suborder of marine lamp shells

Terebratellidina is one of two existing suborders of Terebratulid brachiopods, the other being Terebratulidina.

== Classification ==
- Superfamily Kraussinoidea
- Superfamily Laqueoidea
- Superfamily Megathyridoidea
- Superfamily Platidioidea
- Superfamily Terebratelloidea
  - Family Dallinidae
  - Family Ecnomiosidae
  - Family Terebratellidae
  - Family Thaumatosiidae
- Superfamily Zeillerioidea
- Superfamily Bouchardioidea
- Superfamily Gwynioidea
- Superfamily Kingenoidea
- Superfamily Incertae sedis
  - Family Tythothyrididae
