= Mal Paso Formation =

Geologic formation in Mexico

- Stratigraphic range: Late Albian
- Type: Formation

Location
- Country: Mexico

The Mal Paso Formation is a geologic formation in Mexico. It preserves fossils dating back to the Cretaceous period, Late Albian.

== See also ==
- List of fossiliferous stratigraphic units in Mexico
