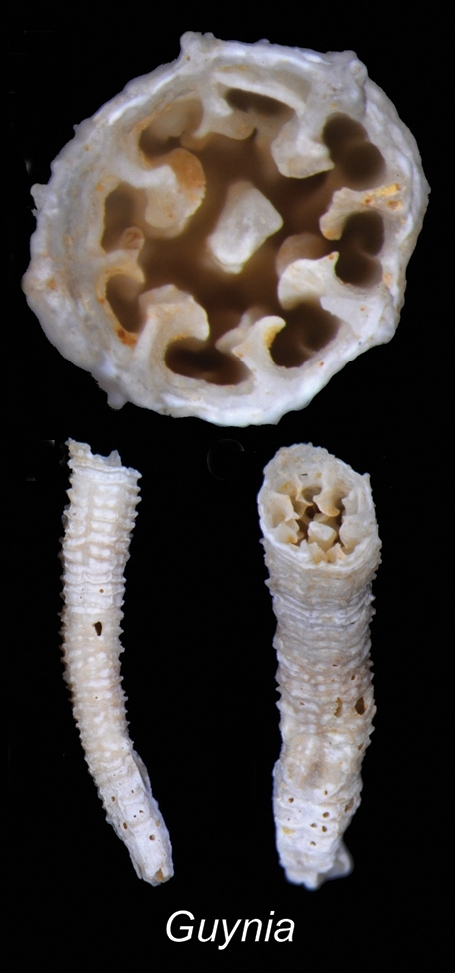
- Guynia annulata

Scientific classification
- Kingdom: Animalia
- Phylum: Cnidaria
- Subphylum: Anthozoa
- Class: Hexacorallia
- Order: Scleractinia
- Family: Guyniidae

= Guyniidae =

Family of corals

Guyniidae is a family of corals belonging to the order Scleractinia (hard corals).

Genera:

- Bistylia Tenison-Woods, 1878
- Cyathosmilia Tenison-Woods, 1878
- Guynia Duncan, 1873
- Onchotrochus Duncan, 1869
- Pourtalocyathus Cairns, 1979
