= Lepidobatrachus australis =

Lepidobatrachus australis Temporal range: Late Miocene–Early Pliocene

Scientific classification
- Kingdom: Animalia
- Phylum: Chordata
- Class: Amphibia
- Order: Anura
- Family: Ceratophryidae
- Genus: Lepidobatrachus
- Species: †L. australis

Binomial name
- †Lepidobatrachus australis Nicoli, 2015

Extinct species of frog

Lepidobatrachus australis is an extinct species of Lepidobatrachus that lived during the Neogene period.

== Distribution ==
Lepidobatrachus australis is known from Argentina.
