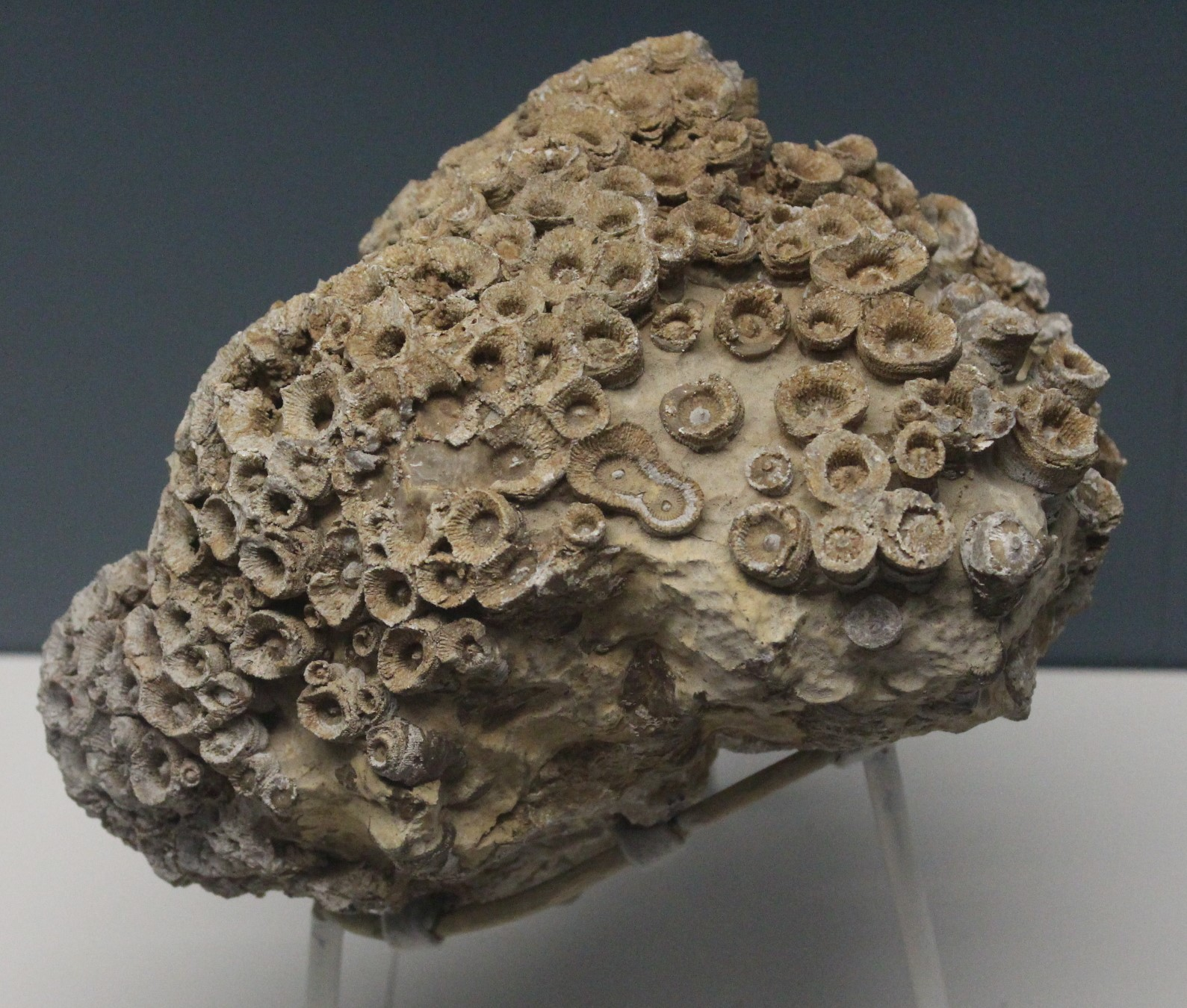
- Fossil on display at the University of Michigan Museum of Natural History

Scientific classification
- Domain: Eukaryota
- Kingdom: Animalia
- Phylum: Cnidaria
- Subphylum: Anthozoa
- Class: †Rugosa
- Family: †Lithostrotionidae
- Genus: †Lithostrotion; Fleming, 1828

= Lithostrotion =

Extinct genus of corals

Lithostrotion is a genus of rugose coral which is commonly found as a fossil within Carboniferous Limestone. Lithostrotion is a member of the family Lithostrotionidae. The genus Lithostrotion, a common and readily recognised group of fossils, became extinct by the end of the Palaeozoic era.

== Species ==
- Lithostrotion affine Fleming, 1828
- Lithostrotion araneum (McCoy, 1844)
- Lithostrotion banffense Warren, 1927
- Lithostrotion concinum Lonsdale, 1845
- Lithostrotion decipiens (McCoy, 1849)
- Lithostrotion edmondsi Smith, 1928
- Lithostrotion fasciculatum Fleming, 1828
- Lithostrotion fuicatum Thomson, 1887
- Lithostrotion gracile McCoy, 1851
- Lithostrotion irregulare Phillips, 1836
- Lithostrotion junceum Fleming, 1828
- Lithostrotion maccoyanum Milne-Edwards & Haime, 1851
- Lithostrotion martini Milne-Edwards & Haime, 1851
- Lithostrotion mclareni Sutherland, 1958
- Lithostrotion mutabile (Kelly, 1942)
- Lithostrotion pauciradiale McCoy, 1844
- Lithostrotion sinuosum (Kelly, 1942)
- Lithostrotion sociale Phillips, 1836
- Lithostrotion termieri Rodríguez & Somerville in Rodríguez, Somerville & Said, 2017
- Lithostrotion vorticale (Parkinson, 1808)
- Lithostrotion warreni Warren, 1960
