= Decatur Limestone =

Geologic formation in the United States

- Stratigraphic range: Silurian
- Type: Formation

Lithology
- Primary: limestone

Location
- Region: Mississippi and Tennessee
- Country: United States

The Decatur Limestone is a geologic formation in Tennessee. It preserves fossils dating back to the Silurian period.

== See also ==
- List of fossiliferous stratigraphic units in Tennessee
- Paleontology in Tennessee
