= Oymurania =

Oymurania Temporal range: Cambrian

Scientific classification
- Kingdom: Animalia
- Stem group: Brachiopoda
- Informal group: †Tommotiids
- Informal group: †Tannuolinids (?)
- Genus: †Oymurania; Kouchinsky et al. 2014

Extinct genus of shelled animals

Oymurania is an organophosphatic Cambrian small shelly fossil interpreted as a stem-group Brachiopod. It consists of a pair of Micrina-like shells that broadly follow a logarithmic coiling trajectory with a high rate of expansion.

== Microstructure ==
Its shell comprises an inner prismatic layer, with hexagonal prisms that run through the full depth of the layer, and an outer layer that contains an acrotretid-like microstructure of surface-parallel laminae punctuated by pore-bearing rod-like columns.
