= Varibatrachus =

Varibatrachus Temporal range: Miocene

Scientific classification
- Kingdom: Animalia
- Phylum: Chordata
- Class: Amphibia
- Order: Anura
- Genus: †Varibatrachus
- Species: †V. abraczinskasae

Binomial name
- †Varibatrachus abraczinskasae Parmley et al., 2015

Extinct genus of frogs

Varibatrachus is an extinct genus of frog that lived in Nebraska during the Miocene epoch. It is a monotypic genus containing the species V. abraczinskasae.
