= Arianagnathus =

Arianagnathus Temporal range: Silurian

Scientific classification
- Kingdom: Animalia
- Phylum: Chordata
- Class: †Conodonta
- Order: †Prioniodontida
- Genus: †Arianagnathus

Type species
- Arianagnathus jafariani

Species
- Arianagnathus jafariani

Extinct genus of jawless fishes

Arianagnathus is an extinct genus of conodonts, possibly in the family Balognathidae. The type species A. jafariani is from the Silurian Niur Formation in Iran.
