= Cyclostephanos =

Scientific classification
- Domain: Eukaryota
- Clade: Diaphoretickes
- Clade: SAR
- Clade: Stramenopiles
- Phylum: Gyrista
- Subphylum: Ochrophytina
- Class: Bacillariophyceae
- Order: Thalassiosirales
- Family: Stephanodiscaceae
- Genus: Cyclostephanos; F.E.Round ex Theriot, Hakansson, Kociolek, Round & Stoermer, 1987

Genus of algae

Cyclostephanos is a genus of diatoms belonging to the family Stephanodiscaceae.

The genus has cosmopolitan distribution.

Species:

- Cyclostephanos costatus L.P.Loginova, E.G.Lupikina & G.K.Khursevich, 1984
- Cyclostephanos fenestratus Theriot & Kociolek, 1988
- Cyclostephanos gasseae E.Fourtanier, 1987
