= Acrotretidae =

Acrotretidae Temporal range: Cambrian Stage 3– Silurian

Scientific classification
- Kingdom: Animalia
- Phylum: Brachiopoda
- Class: Lingulata
- Order: †Acrotretida
- Superfamily: †Acrotretoidea
- Family: †Acrotretidae; Schuchert, 1893

Genera
- Acrotreta Kutorga, 1848 (type); Acrothyra Matthew, 1901; Aktassia Popov, 1976; Amictocracens HENDERSON & MACKINNON, 1981; Anabolotreta ROWELL & HENDERSON, 1978; Anelotreta PELMAN in ERMAK & PELMAN, 1986; Angulotreta PALMER, 1954; Aphelotreta ROWELL, 1980; Apsotreta PALMER, 1954; Araktina KONEVA, 1992; Canthylotreta ROWELL, 1966; Conotreta WALCOTT, 1889; Clupeafumosus Topper et al. 2013; Dactylotreta ROWELL & HENDERSON, 1978; Dicondylotreta MEI, 1993; Ditreta BIERNAT, 1973; Eschatelasma POPOV, 1981; Eurytreta ROWELL, 1966; Fascicoma POPOV in NAZAROV & POPOV, 1980; Galinella POPOV & HOLMER; Hadrotreta ROWELL, 1966; Hansotreta KRAUSE & ROWELL, 1975; Hisingerella HENNINGSMOEN in WAERN, THORSLUND & HENNINGSMOEN; Kotylotreta KONEVA, 1990; Linnarssonella WALCOTT, 1902; Linnarssonia WALCOTT, 1885; Longipegma POPOV & HOLMER, 1994; Monophthalma; Neotreta SOBOLEV, 1976; Olentotreta KONEVA, POPOV, & USHATINSKAYA in KONEVA & others, 1990; Opisthotreta PALMER, 1954; Ottenbyella POPOV & HOLMER, 1994; Physotreta ROWELL, 1966; Picnotreta HENDERSON & MACKINNON, 1981; Prototreta BELL, 1938; Quadrisonia ROWELL & HENDERSON, 1978; Rhondellina ROWELL, 1986; Satpakella KONEVA, POPOV, & USHATINSKAYA in KONEVA & others, 1990; Semitreta BIERNAT, 1973; Spondylotreta COOPER, 1956; Stilpnotreta HENDERSON & MACKINNON, 1981; Treptotreta HENDERSON & MACKINNON, 1981; Vandalotreta MERGL, 1988

Family of marine lamp shells

Acrotretidae is a family of brachiopods, the type family of the Acrotretida order.
