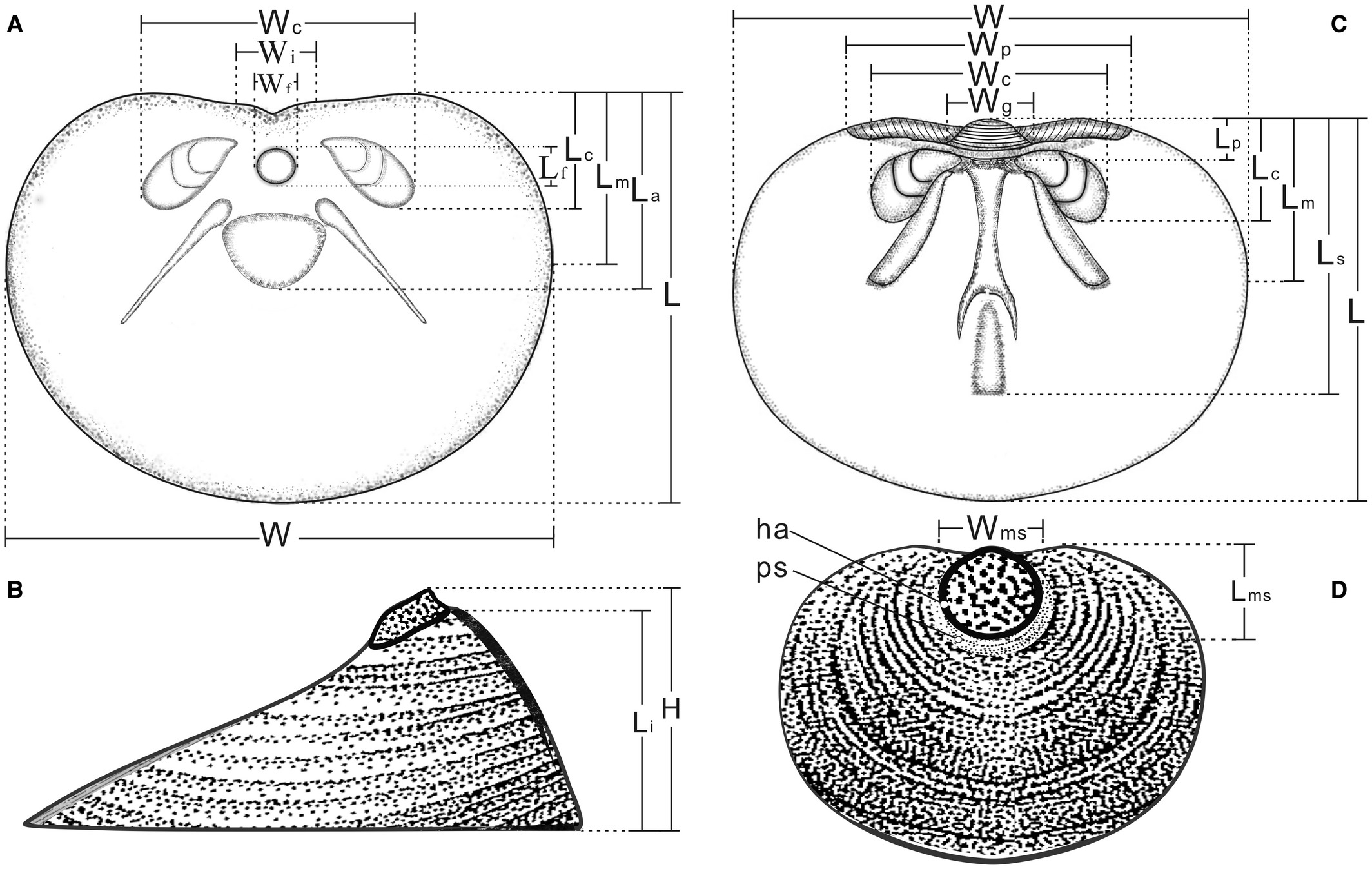
- Diagram of Eohadrotreta zhenbaensis, a Lower Cambrian member of the family Acrotretidae

Scientific classification
- Domain: Eukaryota
- Kingdom: Animalia
- Phylum: Brachiopoda
- Class: Lingulata
- Order: †Acrotretida; Kuhn, 1949
- Superfamily: †Acrotretoidea; Schuchert, 1893

= Acrotretida =

Acrotretida Temporal range: Lower Cambrian–Middle Devonian

Extinct order of brachiopods

Acrotretides (Acrotretida) are an extinct order of linguliform brachiopods in the class Lingulata. Acrotretida contains 8 families within the sole superfamily Acrotretoidea. They lived from the Lower Cambrian to the Middle Devonian, rapidly diversifying during the middle Cambrian. In the upper Cambrian, linguliforms reached the apex of their diversity: acrotretides and their relatives the lingulides together comprised nearly 70% of brachiopod genera at this time. Though acrotretides continued to diversify during the Ordovician, their proportional dominance declined, as rhynchonelliforms took on a larger role in brachiopod faunas.

Many acrotretides have a tall and conical ventral valve with a pedicle opening at the apex, while the dorsal valve is convex to a much lesser degree. Based on preserved muscle scars, the lateral muscles were shifted back and condensed into large bundles of tendons. These replaced the stout, column-like central muscles, which are present in other linguliforms but apparently absent in acrotretides. The larval shell, which is retained near the pedicle opening, has a strongly pitted texture. The adult shell is smooth, with a rounded outline and an organo-phosphatic composition, like other linguliforms.

== Subgroups ==
- Family Acrotretidae Schuchert, 1893 (Lower Cambrian - mid-Silurian [Wenlock])
- Family Biernatidae Holmer, 1989 (Lower Ordovician [Tremadoc] - Middle Devonian)
- Family Ceratretidae Rowell, 1965 (Cambrian)
- Family Curticiidae Walcott & Schuchert, 1908 (Middle Cambrian - Upper Cambrian)
- Family Eoconulidae Rowell, 1965 (Middle Ordovician [Arenig] - Upper Ordovician [Ashgill])
- Family Ephippelasmatidae Rowell, 1965 (Upper Cambrian - Upper Ordovician [Ashgill])
- Family Scaphelasmatidae Rowell, 1965 (Middle Cambrian [Amgan] - Upper Silurian)
- Family Torynelasmatidae Rowell, 1965 (Middle Ordovician [Arenig] - Silurian)
- Incertae sedis genera
  - Craniotreta Termier & Monod, 1978
  - Dzhagdicus Sobolev, 1992
  - Schizotretoides Termier & Monod, 1978
