= 2013 in paleontology =

Paleontology or palaeontology is the study of prehistoric life forms on Earth through the examination of plant and animal fossils. This includes the study of body fossils, tracks (ichnites), burrows, cast-off parts, fossilised feces (coprolites), palynomorphs and chemical residues. Because humans have encountered fossils for millennia, paleontology has a long history both before and after becoming formalized as a science. This article records significant discoveries and events related to paleontology that occurred or were published in the year 2013.

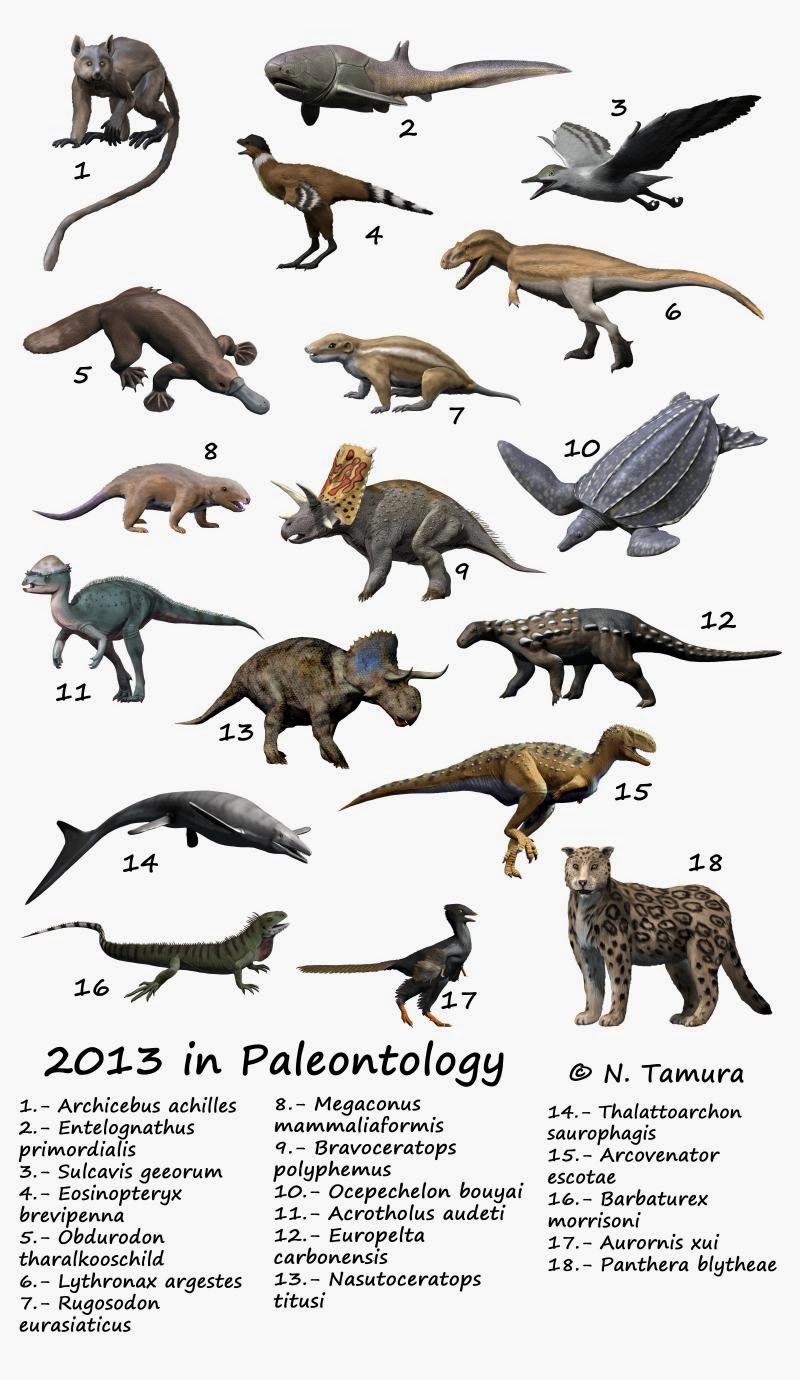
Species described

== Cnidarians ==
Name	Novelty	Status	Authors	Age	Unit	Location	Notes	Images
Alveopora jessicae	Sp. nov	Valid	Bromfield	Miocene		Papua New Guinea	A stony coral, a species of Alveopora.	
Alveopora oliveri	Sp. nov	Valid	Bromfield	Miocene		Papua New Guinea	A stony coral, a species of Alveopora.	
Arctophyllum spitsbergensis	Sp. nov	Valid	Chwieduk	Carboniferous (Gzhelian)	Treskelodden Formation	Norway	A rugose coral belonging to the group Stauriida and the family Cyathopsidae.	
Astreopora wallaceae	Sp. nov	Valid	Bromfield	Miocene		Papua New Guinea	A stony coral, a species of Astreopora.	
Aulastraea crassicalix	Sp. nov	Valid	Löser, Castro & Nieto	Early Cretaceous (Albian)		Spain	A stony coral, a species of Aulastraea.	
Barentsburgia	Gen. et sp. nov	Valid	Chwieduk	Permian (Sakmarian)	Wordiekammen Formation	Norway	A rugose coral belonging to the group Stauriida and the family Aulophyllidae. The type species is B. crinisphyllia.	
Catenipora nishioi	Sp. nov	Valid	Niko & Adachi	Silurian	Gionyama Formation	Japan	A tabulate coral belonging to the family Halysitidae.	
Caulastraea cummingae	Sp. nov	Valid	Bromfield	Miocene		Fiji; Indonesia	A stony coral, a species of Caulastraea.	
Caulastraea geoffreyi	Sp. nov	Valid	Bromfield	Miocene		Indonesia	A stony coral, a species of Caulastraea.	
Cyphastrea aliceae	Sp. nov	Valid	Bromfield	Miocene		Papua New Guinea	A stony coral belonging to the family Faviidae.	
Cyphastrea buddae	Sp. nov	Valid	Bromfield	Miocene		Papua New Guinea	A stony coral belonging to the family Faviidae.	
Cyphastrea spinea	Sp. nov	Valid	Bromfield	Miocene		Fiji	A stony coral belonging to the family Faviidae.	
Euphyllia romani	Sp. nov	Valid	Bromfield	Miocene		Indonesia	A stony coral, a species of Euphyllia.	
Fedorowskites	Gen. et sp. nov	Valid	Chwieduk	Permian (Wordian to Lopingian)	Kapp Starostin Formation	Norway; Russia	A rugose coral belonging to the order Stauriida and the family Polycoeliidae. The type species is F. spitsbergensis; genus also includes "Sochkineophyllum" zavodovskyi Sokolov (1959).	
Fomichevella borealis	Sp. nov	Valid	Chwieduk	Carboniferous (Gzhelian)	Treskelodden Formation	Norway	A rugose coral belonging to the order Stauriida and the family Kleopatrinidae.	
Galaxea kabairaensis	Sp. nov	Valid	Bromfield	Miocene		Papua New Guinea	A stony coral, a species of Galaxea.	
Galaxea salayarensis	Sp. nov	Valid	Bromfield	Pliocene		Indonesia	A stony coral, a species of Galaxea.	
Gronfjordphyllum	Gen. et 2 sp. nov	Valid	Chwieduk	Permian (Sakmarian)	Wordiekammen Formation	Norway	A rugose coral belonging to the group Stauriida and the family Aulophyllidae. The type species is G. minor; genus also includes G. parvum.	
Halysites delicatus	Sp. nov	Valid	Niko & Adachi	Silurian	Gionyama Formation	Japan	A tabulate coral belonging to the family Halysitidae.	
Halysites intricatus	Sp. nov	Valid	Niko & Adachi	Silurian	Gionyama Formation	Japan	A tabulate coral belonging to the family Halysitidae.	
Halysites kyushuensis	Sp. nov	Valid	Niko & Adachi	Silurian	Gionyama Formation	Japan	A tabulate coral belonging to the family Halysitidae.	
Heintzella breviseptata	Sp. nov	Valid	Chwieduk	Permian (Sakmarian)	Wordiekammen Formation	Norway	A rugose coral belonging to the order Stauriida and the family Kleopatrinidae.	
Heintzella poljarica	Sp. nov	Valid	Chwieduk	Carboniferous (Gzhelian)	Treskelodden Formation	Norway	A rugose coral belonging to the order Stauriida and the family Kleopatrinidae.	
Heteropistophyllum	Gen. et comb. nov	Valid	Löser, Castro & Nieto	Early Cretaceous		Slovenia; Spain	A stony coral belonging to the group Heterocoeniina and the family Elasmocoeniidae. A new genus for "Pseudopistophyllum" quinqueseptatum Turnšek & Buser (1976).	
Krusenella	Gen. et sp. nov	Valid	Chwieduk	Permian (Sakmarian)	Treskelodden Formation	Norway	A rugose coral belonging to the group Stauriida and the family Antiphyllidae. The type species is K. pachyseptata.	
Leptoria hayae	Sp. nov	Valid	Bromfield	Miocene		Fiji	A stony coral, a species of Leptoria.	
Leptoria traba	Sp. nov	Valid	Bromfield	Miocene		Papua New Guinea	A stony coral, a species of Leptoria.	
Leptoseris lauensis	Sp. nov	Valid	Bromfield	Miocene	Lau Group	Fiji	A stony coral belonging to the family Agariciidae.	
Linnephyllum	Gen. et 2 sp. nov	Valid	Chwieduk	Permian (Sakmarian)	Wordiekammen Formation	Norway	A rugose coral belonging to the order Stauriida and the suborder Aulophyllina. The type species is L. spitsbergensis; genus also includes L. longiseptatum.	
Madracis crassisepta	Sp. nov	Valid	Bromfield	Miocene		Papua New Guinea	A stony coral belonging to the family Pocilloporidae.	
Madracis labrum	Sp. nov	Valid	Bromfield	Miocene		Papua New Guinea	A stony coral belonging to the family Pocilloporidae.	
Marcelohelia	Gen. et sp. nov	Valid	Löser	Late Cretaceous (Maastrichtian)	Cárdenas Formation	Jamaica; Mexico	A coral belonging to the family Felixaraeidae. The type species is M. caribbiensis.	
Metaulastraea elae	Sp. nov	Valid	Löser, Castro & Nieto	Early Cretaceous (Albian)		Spain	A stony coral, a species of Metaulastraea.	
Mitrodendron ultimus	Sp. nov	Valid	Löser, Castro & Nieto	Early Cretaceous (Albian)		Spain	A stony coral, a species of Mitrodendron.	
Montipora pandolfii	Sp. nov	Valid	Bromfield	Miocene		Indonesia	A stony coral, a species of Montipora.	
Montipora teresea	Sp. nov	Valid	Bromfield	Miocene		Papua New Guinea	A stony coral, a species of Montipora.	
Montipora wilsonae	Sp. nov	Valid	Bromfield	Early Pleistocene		Indonesia	A stony coral, a species of Montipora.	
Multithecopora fukugakuchiensis	Sp. nov	Valid	Niko, Ibaraki & Tazawa	Early Carboniferous	Omi Limestone	Japan	A tabulate coral belonging to the order Auloporida and the family Multithecoporidae.	
Paraacanthogyra hispanica	Sp. nov	Valid	Löser, Castro & Nieto	Early Cretaceous (Albian)		Spain	A stony coral, a species of Paraacanthogyra.	
Parnassomeandra steuberi	Sp. nov	Valid	Löser	Cretaceous (Albian and Cenomanian)		France; Greece	A stony coral belonging to the superfamily Eugyroidea and the family Eugyridae.	
Platygyra renemai	Sp. nov	Valid	Bromfield	Miocene		Papua New Guinea	A stony coral, a species of Platygyra.	
Pleurodendron	Gen. et sp. nov	Valid	Löser, Castro & Nieto	Early Cretaceous (Albian)		Spain	A stony coral belonging to the group Heterocoeniina and the family Elasmocoeniidae. The type species is Pleurodendron prebeticum.	
Pseudoroemeripora watanabei	Sp. nov	Valid	Niko	Early Carboniferous	Akiyoshi Limestone Group	Japan	A tabulate coral.	
Pseudotimania arctica	Sp. nov	Valid	Chwieduk	Carboniferous (Gzhelian) to Permian (Sakmarian)	Treskelodden Formation	Norway	A rugose coral belonging to the group Stauriida and the family Bothrophyllidae.	
Pseudotimania borealis	Sp. nov	Valid	Chwieduk	Carboniferous (Gzhelian) to Permian (Sakmarian)	Treskelodden Formation; Wordiekammen Formation	Norway	A rugose coral belonging to the group Stauriida and the family Bothrophyllidae.	
Pseudotimania longiseptata	Sp. nov	Valid	Chwieduk	Carboniferous (Gzhelian) to Permian (Sakmarian)	Treskelodden Formation; Wordiekammen Formation	Norway	A rugose coral belonging to the group Stauriida and the family Bothrophyllidae.	
Silingastraea valentina	Sp. nov	Valid	Löser, Castro & Nieto	Early Cretaceous (Albian)		Spain	A stony coral, a species of Silingastraea.	
Sutherlandia sphaericus	Sp. nov	Valid	Niko, Haikawa & Fujikawa	Carboniferous (Serpukhovian)	Akiyoshi Limestone Group	Japan	A tabulate coral.	
Symphyllia densium	Sp. nov	Valid	Bromfield	Early Pleistocene		Indonesia	A stony coral belonging to the family Mussidae.	
Tschussovskenia borealis	Sp. nov	Valid	Chwieduk	Carboniferous (Gzhelian)	Treskelodden Formation	Norway	A rugose coral belonging to the order Stauriida and the family Lithostrotionidae.	
?Tschussovskenia columellata	Sp. nov	Valid	Chwieduk	Permian (Sakmarian)	Treskelodden Formation	Norway	A rugose coral belonging to the order Stauriida and the family Lithostrotionidae.	
Turbinaria jacksoni	Sp. nov	Valid	Bromfield	Miocene		Fiji	A stony coral, a species of Turbinaria.	
Yakovleviella spitsbergensis	Sp. nov	Valid	Chwieduk	Carboniferous (Gzhelian) and Permian (Sakmarian)	Wordiekammen Formation	Norway	A rugose coral belonging to the group Stauriida and the family Aulophyllidae.	

== Bryozoans ==
Name	Novelty	Status	Authors	Age	Unit	Location	Notes	Images
Adlatipora	Gen. et sp. nov	Valid	Gautier, Jackson & McKinney	Permian		United States	An acanthocladiid bryozoan. The type species is Adlatipora fossulata.	
Basyaylella	Gen. et sp. nov	Valid	Zágoršek & Gordon	Late Tortonian	Mut Basin	Turkey	An ascophoran bryozoan. Its type species is Basyaylella elsae.	
Charixa goshouraensis	Sp. nov	Valid	Dick et al.	Cretaceous (late Albian or early Cenomanian)		Japan	A cheilostome bryozoan. Originally described as a species of Charixa; Dick, Sakamoto & Komatsu (2018) transferred this species to the genus Kenocharixa.	
Charixa sagnieri	Sp. nov	Valid	Taylor & Calzada	Early Cretaceous (Aptian)		Spain	A member of Malacostegina belonging to the family Electridae.	
Conopeum wilsoni	Sp. nov	Valid	Di Martino & Taylor	Late Cretaceous (Late Campanian or Maastrichtian)	Simsima Formation	United Arab Emirates–Oman border region	A species of Conopeum.	
Haplostoechios	Gen. et 2 sp. nov	Valid	Dick et al.	Cretaceous (late Albian or early Cenomanian)		Japan	A malacostegan. Genus contains two species: H. hayamiae and H. clusum.	
Heloclema uralicum	Sp. nov	Valid	Tolokonnikova	Early Carboniferous		Russia	A species of Heloclema.	
Monoceratopora whybrowi	Sp. nov	Valid	Di Martino & Taylor	Late Cretaceous (Late Campanian or Maastrichtian)	Simsima Formation	United Arab Emirates–Oman border region	A species of Monoceratopora.	
Ostrovskia	Gen. et sp. nov	Valid	Zágoršek & Gordon	Late Tortonian	Mut Basin	Turkey	An ascophoran bryozoan. Its type species is Ostrovskia triforamina.	
Poricellaria sakurkari	Sp. nov	Valid	Sonar & Gaikwad	Eocene (Lutetian) to Miocene (Burdigalian)		India	A member of Flustrina belonging to the family Poricellariidae.	
Poricellaria waioriensis	Sp. nov	Valid	Sonar & Gaikwad	Eocene (Lutetian) to Miocene (Burdigalian)		India	A member of Flustrina belonging to the family Poricellariidae.	
Primorella kodinkensis	Sp. nov	Valid	Tolokonnikova	Early Carboniferous		Russia	A species of Primorella.	
Steginoporella chiplonkari	Sp. nov	Valid	Sonar & Gaikwad	Oligocene (Chattian)	Maniyara Fort Formation	India	A member of Flustrina belonging to the family Steginoporellidae.	
Steginoporella mathuri	Sp. nov	Valid	Sonar & Gaikwad	Miocene (Aquitanian)		India	A member of Flustrina belonging to the family Steginoporellidae.	
Steginoporella murachbanensis	Sp. nov	Valid	Sonar & Gaikwad	Miocene (Burdigalian)	Chhasara Formation	India	A member of Flustrina belonging to the family Steginoporellidae.	
Tyloporella smithi	Sp. nov	Valid	Di Martino & Taylor	Late Cretaceous (Late Campanian or Maastrichtian)	Simsima Formation	United Arab Emirates–Oman border region	A species of Tyloporella.	
Vincularia feddeni	Sp. nov	Valid	Sonar & Gaikwad	Eocene (Lutetian) to Miocene (Burdigalian)		India	A member of Flustrina belonging to the family Vinculariidae.	
Wilbertopora cheethami	Sp. nov	Valid	Di Martino & Taylor	Late Cretaceous (Late Campanian or Maastrichtian)	Simsima Formation	United Arab Emirates–Oman border region	A species of Wilbertopora.	

== Brachiopods ==
Name	Novelty	Status	Authors	Age	Unit	Location	Notes	Images
Aegiromena (Aegiromenella)	Subgen. et comb. nov	Valid	Rong et al.	Ordovician (Hirnantian and Katian) to Silurian (Aeronian)	Kosov Formation; Králův Dvůr Formation; Panghsa-pye Formation; Whittaker Formation	Canada; China; Czech Republic; Kazakhstan; Myanmar	A member of Plectambonitoidea belonging to the family Xenambonitidae. The type species is "Schuchertella" planissima Reed (1915); the subgenus also includes Aegiromena durbenensis Nikitin et al. (1980), "Chonetoidea" obliqua Jin & Chatterton (1997), Aegiromena ultima Havlíček (1967) and Aegiromena urbana Havlíček (1967).	
Agirovia	Gen. et comb. nov	Valid	Waterhouse	Carboniferous		Germany	A member of Productida belonging to the family Buxtoniidae. The type species is "Tolmatchoffia" demaneti Boger & Fiebig (1963)	
Ainimia	Gen. et comb. nov	Valid	Waterhouse	Permian (Guadalupian)	Aifat Formation	Indonesia	A member of Productida belonging to the family Auriculispinidae. The type species is "Linoproductus" pigrami Archbold (1981).	
Anamarginatia	Gen. et comb. nov	Valid	Waterhouse	Carboniferous (Tournaisian)	Enga Sandstone	Australia	A member of Productida belonging to the family Buxtoniidae. The type species is "Marginatia" mimica Roberts (1971)	
Anathyris helmersenioides	Sp. nov	Valid	Rzhonsnitskaya in Modzalevskaya, Alvarez & Rzhonsnitskaya	Devonian (Frasnian)	Kuznetsk Basin	Russia	A member of Athyridida belonging to the family Athyrididae.	
Anathyris strelnaensis	Sp. nov	Valid	Rzhonsnitskaya in Modzalevskaya, Alvarez & Rzhonsnitskaya	Devonian (Frasnian)	Kuznetsk Basin	Russia	A member of Athyridida belonging to the family Athyrididae.	
Anidanthia	Gen. et comb. nov	Valid	Waterhouse	Permian (Sakmarian)	Elvinia Formation	Australia	A member of Productida belonging to the family Anidanthidae. The type species is Anidanthus" paucicostatus Waterhouse (1986).	
Anidanthus perdosus	Sp. nov	Valid	Waterhouse	Permian (Kungurian)	Branxton Subgroup	Australia	A member of Productida belonging to the family Anidanthidae.	
Anisopleurella asiatica	Sp. nov	Valid	Rong et al.	Ordovician (Hirnantian)		China	A member of Strophomenoidea belonging to the family Sowerbyellidae.	
Appelinaria	Gen. et comb. nov	Valid	Waterhouse	Permian (Capitanian)	Word Formation	United States (Texas)	A member of Productida belonging to the family Paucispinauriidae. The type species is "Grandaurispina" crassa Cooper & Grant (1975).	
Arcuatusia	Gen. et comb. nov	Valid	Waterhouse	Carboniferous (Tournaisian)	Banff Formation	Canada	A member of Productida belonging to the family Ovatiidae. The type species is Ovatia" prolata Carter (1987).	
Arenorthis paranaensis	Sp. nov	Valid	Benedetto, Halpern & Inchausti	Late Ordovician (Hirnantian)	Eusebio Ayala Formation	Paraguay	A species of Arenorthis.	
Askepasma saproconcha	sp nov	Valid	Topper et al.	Lower Cambrian	Wirrapowie Limestone	Australia	A member of Paterinata, a species of Askepasma.	
Austroboreas	Gen. et comb. nov	Junior synonym	Waterhouse	Carboniferous (Moscovian)	Las Salinas Formation	Argentina; Mongolia; Russia	A member of Productida belonging to the family Overtoniidae. The type species is "Lanipustula" kletsi Taboada & Shi (2011); genus also includes "Lanipustula" patagonensis Simanauskas (1996) and species from the Carboniferous of Verkhoyansk (Russia), Mongolia and possibly Europe that were previously referred to Lanipustula. Waterhouse (2018) subsequently considered Austroboreas to be a junior synonym of Levipustula.	
Baikuralia	Gen. et comb. nov	Valid	Waterhouse	Permian (Capitanian)		Russia	A member of Productida belonging to the family Strophalosiidae. The type species is "Strophalosia" bajkurica Ustritsky in Ustritsky & Chernyak (1963).	
Balkhasheconcha bamberi	Sp. nov	Valid	Waterhouse	Permian (Asselian)	Jungle Creek Formation	Canada (Yukon)	A member of Productida belonging to the family Rhamnariidae.	
Baoshanella	Gen. et sp. nov	Valid	Xu	Ordovician (late Darriwilian)	Shihtien Formation	China	A member of Dalmanelloidea belonging to the family Portranellidae. The type species is B. baoshanensis.	
Bellaspinosina	Gen. et comb. nov	Valid	Waterhouse	Permian		United States (Texas)	A member of Productida belonging to the family Paucispinauriidae. The type species is "Grandaurispina" bella Cooper & Grant (1975); genus also includes "Grandaurispina" rara Cooper & Grant (1975).	
Bilinospina	Gen. et comb. nov	Valid	Waterhouse	Permian (Kungurian)	Cathedral Mountain Formation	United States (Texas)	A member of Productida belonging to the family Dictyoclostidae. The type species is "Nudauris" linospina Cooper & Grant (1971).	
Biseptata	Gen. et sp. nov	Valid	Madison	Ordovician		Russia	A member of Strophomenida. The type species is Biseptata briani.	
Boggabria	Gen. et comb. nov	Valid	Waterhouse	Carboniferous	Namoi Formation	Australia	A member of Productida belonging to the family Retariidae. The type species is "Antiquatonia" spinulicosta Roberts (1976).	
Calandisa	Gen. et sp. nov	Valid	Waterhouse & Campbell in Waterhouse	Permian (Artinskian)	Takitimu Group	New Zealand	A member of Productida belonging to the family Anidanthidae. The type species is C. solitarius.	
Calliprotonia mclareni	Sp. nov	Valid	Waterhouse	Permian (Asselian)	Jungle Creek Formation	Canada (Yukon)	A member of Productida belonging to the family Echinoconchidae.	
Calvadonia	Gen. et comb. nov	Valid	Waterhouse	Permian (Wuchiapingian)	Magnesian Limestone	United Kingdom	A member of Productida belonging to the family Horridoniidae. The type species is "Producta" calva Sowerby (1829).	
Cameronovia	Gen. et sp. nov	Valid	Waterhouse	Permian (Roadian)	Assistance Formation	Canada	A member of Productida belonging to the family Auriculispinidae. The type species is C. milleri.	
Campbelliconcha	Gen. et comb. nov	Valid	Waterhouse	Carboniferous (Viséan)		Australia	A member of Productida belonging to the family Rhamnariidae. The type species is "Waagenoconcha" delicatula Campbell (1956).	
Chhidrusia	Gen. et comb. nov	Valid	Waterhouse	Permian (Wuchiapingian)	Chhidru Formation	Pakistan	A member of Productida belonging to the family Schrenkiellidae. The type species is "Productus (Linoproductus)) simensis" abrupta Reed (1944).	
Chunanella	Gen. et sp. nov	Valid	Rong et al.	Silurian (Rhuddanian)	Anji Formation	China	A member of Enteletoidea belonging to the family Schizophoriidae. The type species is C. chunanensis.	
Ciliciumia	Gen. et sp. nov	Valid	Waterhouse	Permian (Wuchiapingian)		Armenia; India; Iran	A member of Productida belonging to the family Costispiniferidae. The type species is C. cilicia.	
Comagunia	Gen. et comb. nov	Valid	Waterhouse	Carboniferous	Windsor Group	Canada (Nova Scotia)	A member of Productida belonging to the family Paucispinauriidae. The type species is "Productus" lyelli Verneuil in Lyell (1845); genus also includes "Productus" dawsoni Beede (1911).	
Commarginalia	Gen. et sp. et comb. nov	Valid	Waterhouse & Nazer in Waterhouse	Carboniferous and Permian	Ettrain Formation	Australia; Canada; Mongolia; Russia	A member of Productida belonging to the family Paucispinauriidae. The type species is C. yukonensis; genus also includes "Platycancrinella" kletsi Waterhouse (2010) and "Costatumulus" sidorkini Manankov (2004).	
Cooperinoides	Gen. et comb. nov	Valid	Waterhouse	Permian (Asselian)	Neal Ranch Formation	United States (Texas)	A member of Productida belonging to the family Cooperinidae. The type species is "Cooperina" triangulata Cooper & Grant (1975).	
Cornumukia	Gen. et comb. nov	Valid	Waterhouse	Permian (Roadian)	Rat Buri Limestone	Thailand	A member of Productida belonging to the family Paucispiniferidae. The type species is Kozlowskia" cornuta Grant (1976).	
Coronatonia	Gen. et comb. nov	Valid	Waterhouse	Carboniferous (Viséan)		United Kingdom	A member of Productida belonging to the family Buxtoniidae. The type species is "Kochiproductus" coronus Shiells (1968)	
Costacondraia	Gen. et comb. nov	Valid	Waterhouse	Carboniferous		United States (Nebraska)	A member of Productida belonging to the family Retariidae. The type species is "Dictyoclostus portlockianus" crassicostatus Dunbar & Condra (1932).	
Costadonia	Gen. et comb. nov	Valid	Waterhouse	Devonian (Famennian)	Myrtlevale Formation	Australia	A member of Productida belonging to the family Leioproductidae. The type species is "Mesoplica" hillae McKellar (1970).	
Costaglobus	Gen. et comb. nov	Valid	Waterhouse	Carboniferous (Viséan)	Copeland Road Formation	Australia	A member of Productida belonging to the family Dictyoclostidae. The type species is "Inflatia" engeli Roberts (1976).	
Costatonia	Gen. et comb. nov	Valid	Waterhouse	Devonian (Emsian)	Delorme Formation	Canada (Yukon)	A member of Productida belonging to the family Productellidae. The type species is "Chattertonia" mackenzia Perry (1984).	
Costatumulus ganelini	Sp. nov	Valid	Waterhouse	Permian (Kungurian)		Russia	A member of Productida belonging to the family Auriculispinidae.	
Costavonia	Gen. et comb. nov	Valid	Waterhouse	Carboniferous (Tournaisian)	Banff Formation	Canada	A member of Productida belonging to the family Avoniidae. The type species is "Productus" minnewankensis Shimer (1926).	
Crassispinosella	Gen. et comb. nov	Valid	Waterhouse	Permian (Asselian)	Glencoe Formation	Australia	A member of Productida belonging to the family Strophalosiidae. The type species is "Strophalosia" subcircularis Clarke (1969).	
Dawesionia	Gen. et sp. nov	Valid	Waterhouse	Devonian (Famennian)		Australia	A member of Productida belonging to the family Proboscidellidae. The type species is D. milkmani.	
Deliella delicatula	Sp. nov	Valid	Rong et al.	Silurian (Rhuddanian)		China	A member of the family Craniidae.	
Disparatia	Gen. et sp. nov	Valid	Waterhouse	Carboniferous	Canyon Fiord Formation	Canada (Nunavut)	A member of Productida belonging to the family Marginiferidae. The type species is D. nassichuki.	
Dolerorthis multicostellata	Sp. nov	Valid	Rong et al.	Silurian (Rhuddanian)		China	A member of Orthoidea belonging to the family Hesperorthidae.	
Donakovia	Gen. et comb. nov	Valid	Waterhouse	Carboniferous (Viséan)		Russia	A member of Productida belonging to the family Proboscidellidae. The type species is "Ovatia" markovskii Donakova (1975).	
Dzhiremulia	Gen. et sp. et comb. nov	Valid	Waterhouse	Permian	Assistance Formation	Canada (Nunavut); Mongolia	A member of Productida belonging to the family Yakovleviidae. The type species is D. conlustratus; genus also includes "Yakovlevia" dzhiremulensis Manakov (1998).	
Elucidatea	Gen. et sp. nov	Valid	Waterhouse	Carboniferous (Moscovian)	Khao Luak Formation	Thailand	A member of Productida belonging to the family Yakovleviidae. The type species is E. peterormus.	
Engasia	Gen. et comb. nov	Valid	Waterhouse	Carboniferous (Tournaisian)	Enga Formation	Australia	A member of Productida belonging to the family Leioproductidae. The type species is "Magnumbonella" prolata Roberts (1971).	
Engellinus	Gen. et comb. nov	Valid	Waterhouse	Carboniferous	Faulkland Formation	Australia	A member of Productida belonging to the family Paucispinauriidae. The type species is "Linoproductus (Balakhonia)" rawdonvalensis Peou & Engel (1979); genus also includes "Linoproductus (Linoproductus)" kerripitensis Peou & Engel (1979).	
Eomarginia	Gen. et comb. nov	Valid	Waterhouse	Carboniferous (Viséan)		Australia	A member of Productida belonging to the family Paucispiniferidae. The type species is Eomarginifera" megalotis Roberts (1976).	
Eopholidostrophia (Megapholidostrophia)	Subgen. et sp. nov	Valid	Rong et al.	Silurian (Rhuddanian), possibly also Ordovician (Katian)	Anji Formation	China; United Kingdom?	A member of Strophomenoidea belonging to the family Eopholidostrophiidae. The type species is Eopholidostrophia (Megapholidostrophia) magnifica; the subgenus might also include Eopholidostrophia mediocostalis (Reed, 1905).	
Eoplectodonta (Eoplectodonta) boucoti	Sp. nov	Valid	Rong et al.	Silurian (Rhuddanian)		China	A member of Strophomenoidea belonging to the family Sowerbyellidae.	
Eospirifer (Eospirifer) eosinensis	Sp. nov	Valid	Rong et al.	Silurian (Rhuddanian)		China	A member of Spiriferida belonging to the family Eospiriferidae.	
Eospirifer ghobadiae	Sp. nov	Valid	Popov & Cocks	Silurian (Aeronian)		Iran	A member of Spiriferida belonging to the family Eospiriferidae.	
Eospirifer (Protospirifer)	Subgen. nov	Valid	Rong et al.	Ordovician (Katian and Hirnantian)	Changwu Formation; Arndell Sandstone?	China; Australia?	A member of Spiriferida belonging to the family Eospiriferidae. The type species is Eospirifer praecursor Rong, Zhan & Han (1994).	
Epitomyonia subquadrata	Sp. nov	Valid	Rong et al.	Silurian (Rhuddanian)		China	A member of Dalmanelloidea belonging to the family Dicoelosiidae.	
Fardenia (Fardenia) flexa	Sp. nov	Valid	Rong et al.	Silurian (Rhuddanian)		China	A member of Orthotetida belonging to the family Chilidiopsidae.	
Fimbrianalosia	Gen. et comb. et sp. nov	Valid	Waterhouse	Permian	Bap Formation	Canada (Yukon); India	A member of Productida belonging to the family Strophalosiidae. The type species is "Strophalosia" perfecta Waterhouse & Rao (1989); genus also includes new species F. ettrainensis Nazer & Waterhouse.	
Fimbrininia	Gen. et sp. nov	Valid	Waterhouse	Permian (Asselian)	Jungle Creek Formation	Canada (Yukon)	A member of Productida belonging to the family Overtoniidae. The type species is F. spinosa.	
Fimbrinusia	Gen. et comb. nov	Valid	Waterhouse	Carboniferous	Hare Fiord Formation	Canada (Nunavut)	A member of Productida belonging to the family Overtoniidae. The type species is "Fimbrinia" borealis Carter & Poletaev (1998).	
Fortispinalosia	Gen. et comb. nov	Valid	Waterhouse	Carboniferous	Warsaw Formation	United States (Missouri)	A member of Productida belonging to the family Strophalosiidae. The type species is "Strophalosia" fortispinosa Hinchey & Ray (1935).	
Gadikao	Gen. et comb. nov	Disputed	Waterhouse	Permian (Kungurian)	Gadikao Formation	China	A member of Productida belonging to the family Marginiferidae. The type species is "Spinomarginifera" concentrica He & Shi (2008). Considered to be a junior synonym of the genus Paraplicatifera by Shen et al. (2017).	
Gemmarcula buerai	Sp. nov	Valid	Calzada, Maza & Moreno	Early Cretaceous (Aptian)		Spain	A member of the family Dallinidae.	
Geniculatusia	Gen. et comb. nov	Valid	Waterhouse	Permian (Wuchiapingian)		India	A member of Productida belonging to the family Rhamnariidae. The type species is "Productus" gangeticus Diener (1897).	
Gilmoria	Gen. et sp. nov	Valid	Waterhouse	Carboniferous	Gilmore Limestone	United States (Iowa)	A member of Productida belonging to the family Ovatiidae. The type species is G. gilmorensis.	
Glabauriella	Gen. et comb. nov	Valid	Waterhouse	Permian		United States (Texas)	A member of Productida belonging to the family Paucispiniferidae. The type species is Paucispinifera" quadrata Cooper & Grant (1975).	
Glabrispinus	Gen. et comb. et sp. nov	Valid	Waterhouse	Permian (Kungurian)		United States (Texas)	A member of Productida belonging to the family Waagenoconchidae. The type species is "Kochiproductus" elongatus Cooper & Grant (1975); genus also includes new species G. kingi.	
Globicorrugata	Gen. et 2 sp. nov	Valid	Waterhouse	Carboniferous		Kazakhstan; United Kingdom	A member of Productida belonging to the family Paucispinauriidae. The type species is G. settlensis; genus also includes G. inflata.	
Grantevia	Gen. et comb. nov	Valid	Waterhouse	Permian		United States (Texas)	A member of Productida belonging to the family Linoproductidae. The type species is "Linoproductus" semisulcatus Cooper & Grant (1975).	
Harkeria	Gen. et sp. nov	Junior homonym	Waterhouse	Permian	Assistance Formation	Canada (Nunavut)	A member of Productida belonging to the family Yakovleviidae. The type species is H. studiosus. The generic name is preoccupied by Harkeria Cameron (1900).	
Hesperorthis orientalis	Sp. nov	Valid	Rong et al.	Silurian (Rhuddanian)		China	A member of Orthoidea belonging to the family Hesperorthidae.	
Horridonia grandis	Sp. nov	Valid	Waterhouse	Permian (Capitanian)	Trold Fiord Formation	Canada (Nunavut)	A member of Productida belonging to the family Horridoniidae.	
Huaitakia	Gen. et comb. nov	Valid	Waterhouse	Permian (Changhsingian)	Huai Tak Formation	Thailand	A member of Productida belonging to the family Institellidae. The type species is Glyptosteges" percostatus Waterhouse (1983).	
Igniculus	Gen. et comb. nov	Valid	Waterhouse	Carboniferous (Viséan)	Windsor Group	Canada (Nova Scotia)	A member of Productida belonging to the family Ovatiidae. The type species is Productus (Linoproductus)" semicubiculus Bell (1929).	
Inflatusia	Gen. et sp. nov	Valid	Waterhouse	Carboniferous (Gzhelian)	Jungle Creek Formation	Canada (Yukon)	A member of Productida belonging to the family Horridoniidae. The type species is I. ogilviensis.	
Iranospirifer	Gen. et sp. nov	Valid	Popov & Cocks	Silurian (Aeronian)	Qarabil Limestone	Iran	A member of Spiriferida belonging to the family Hedeinopsidae. The type species is I. qarabilensis.	
Jinyugania	Gen. et comb. nov	Disputed	Waterhouse	Permian		China	A member of Productida belonging to the family Aulostegidae. The type species is "Strophalosia" poyangensis Kayser (1883); genus also includes "Edriosteges" acuminatus Liao (1980) and "Aulosteges" subplicatilis Frech (1911). Considered to be a junior synonym of the genus Edriosteges by Shen et al. (2017).	
Karadagella szentei	Sp. nov	Valid	Vörös	Late Jurassic (Oxfordian)		Hungary		
Katastrophomena zheganensis	Sp. nov	Valid	Rong et al.	Silurian (Rhuddanian)		China	A member of Strophomenoidea belonging to the family Strophomenidae.	
Kochiproductus (Kochiproductus) imperiosus	Sp. nov	Valid	Waterhouse	Permian	Jungle Creek Formation	Canada (Yukon)	A member of Productida belonging to the family Buxtoniidae.	
Koyaonoia	Gen. et comb. nov	Valid	Waterhouse	Permian (Sakmarian)	Ko Yao Noi Formation	Thailand	A member of Productida belonging to the family Rhamnariidae. The type species is "Juresania" dissimilis Waterhouse (1981).	
Kwantovia	Gen. et comb. nov	Valid	Waterhouse	Carboniferous (Viséan)		Japan	A member of Productida belonging to the family Institellidae. The type species is Rugicostella" sakagamii Yanagida (1973).	
Leptagonia? lakhalensis	Sp. nov	Valid	Popov in Ghobadi Pour et al.	Devonian (Frasnian)		Iran	A member of Strophomenida belonging to the group Strophomenoidea and the family Rafinesquinidae.	
Liaozhuotingia	Gen. et comb. nov	Valid	Waterhouse	Permian		China	A member of Productida; originally assigned to the family Paucispinauriidae, subsequently transferred to the family Monticuliferidae. The type species is "Cancrinella" pseudotruncata Ustritsky (1960).	
Lineabispina	Gen. et sp. nov	Valid	Waterhouse	Permian	Assistance Formation	Canada (Nunavut)	A member of Productida belonging to the family Gigantoproductidae. The type species is L. ellesmerensis.	
Lineacrassus	Gen. et sp. nov	Valid	Waterhouse	Permian (Asselian)	Jungle Creek Formation	Canada (Yukon)	A member of Productida belonging to the family Linoproductidae. The type species is L. inflatus.	
Lineaproductus	Gen. et comb. nov	Valid	Waterhouse	Carboniferous		Belgium; Germany; Ireland; United Kingdom	A member of Productida belonging to the family Linoproductidae. The type species is "Productus" corrugatus M'Coy (1844).	
Lineatina	Gen. et comb. nov	Valid	Waterhouse	Permian (Wuchiapingian)	Wargal Formation	Pakistan	A member of Productida belonging to the family Linoproductidae. The type species is "Productus" lineatus Waagen (1884); genus also includes "Productus (Linoproductus) cora" var. superba Reed (1944).	
Liniunus	Gen. et comb. nov	Valid	Waterhouse	Permian (Roadian)	Rat Buri Limestone	Thailand	A member of Productida belonging to the family Linoproductidae. The type species is "Linoproductus" kaseti Grant (1976).	
Masitoshia	Gen. et comb. nov	Valid	Waterhouse	Permian (Wordian)	Bera Formation	Malaysia	A member of Productida belonging to the family Auriculispinidae. The type species is "Permundaria" perplexa Sone & Leman (2005).	
Maxwellosia	Gen. et comb. nov	Valid	Waterhouse	Permian (Artinskian)	Wallaby Formation	Australia	A member of Productida belonging to the family Dasyalosiidae. The type species is "Strophalasia jukesi" concava Maxwell (1954).	
Mckellarosia	Gen. et comb. nov	Valid	Waterhouse	Devonian (Famennian)		Australia	A member of Productida belonging to the family Chonopectidae. The type species is "Strophoproductus" rugosus McKellar (1970).	
Menathyris	Gen. et sp. nov	Valid	Feldman	Middle Triassic (early Ladinian)	Saharonim Formation	Israel	A zeilleriid terebratulid. The type species is Menathyris wilsoni.	
Mendacella mutabilis	Sp. nov	Valid	Rong et al.	Silurian (Rhuddanian)		China	A member of Dalmanelloidea belonging to the family Rhipidomellidae.	
Minisaeptosa	Gen. et comb. nov	Valid	Waterhouse	Permian		United States (Texas)	A member of Productida belonging to the family Rhamnariidae. The type species is "Rhamnaria" tenuispinosa Cooper & Grant (1975).	
Minisculinella	Gen. et comb. nov	Valid	Waterhouse	Carboniferous		Belgium	A member of Productida belonging to the family Paucispinauriidae. The type species is "Productus" undiferus Koninck (1846).	
Myrtlevalia	Gen. et comb. nov	Valid	Waterhouse	Devonian (Famennian)	Myrtlevale Formation	Australia	A member of Productida belonging to the family Dasyalosiidae. The type species is "Acanthatia" fragilis McKellar (1970).	
Nahannilusia	Gen. et comb. nov	Valid	Waterhouse	Devonian (Eifelian)	Funeral Formation	Canada (Northwest Territories)	A member of Productida belonging to the family Productellidae. The type species is "Spinulicosta" prima Chatterton & Perry (1978).	
Nalivkininius	Gen. et comb. nov	Valid	Waterhouse	Devonian (Famennian)		Russia	A member of Productida belonging to the family Productellidae. The type species is "Nigerinoplica" nalivkini Pushkin in Lazarev & Pushkin (1986).	
Nasutusia	Gen. et comb. nov	Valid	Waterhouse	Permian (Capitanian)		United States (Texas)	A member of Productida belonging to the family Retariidae. The type species is "Productus semireticulatus" var. capitanensis Girty (1909)	
Nazeriproductus	Gen. et sp. nov	Valid	Waterhouse	Carboniferous (Kasimovian)	Ettrain Formation	Canada (Yukon)	A member of Productida belonging to the family Retariidae. The type species is N. nazeri.	
Nempemarginifera	Gen. et comb. nov	Valid	Waterhouse	Permian (Wuchiapingian)		Armenia; India; Iran	A member of Productida belonging to the family Costispiniferidae. The type species is "Productus" spinosocostatus Abich (1878); genus also includes "Productus" helicus Abich (1878).	
Neochonetes (Huangichonetes) archboldi	Sp. nov	Valid	Zhang et al.	Late Permian (Changhsingian)		China	A member of Rugosochonetidae, a species of Neochonetes.	
Neochonetes semicircularis	Sp. nov	Valid	Zhang et al.	Late Permian (Changhsingian)		China	A member of Rugosochonetidae, a species of Neochonetes.	
Neochonetes (Sommeriella) rectangularis	Sp. nov	Valid	Zhang et al.	Late Permian (Changhsingian)		China	A member of Rugosochonetidae, a species of Neochonetes.	
Neochonetes (Sommeriella) waterhousei	Sp. nov	Valid	Zhang et al.	Late Permian (Changhsingian)		China	A member of Rugosochonetidae, a species of Neochonetes.	
Notoconchidium argentium	Sp. nov	Valid	Wright & Garratt	Late Silurian	Florence Quartzite; Mount Ida Formation	Australia	A member of Rhynchonellida belonging to the family Hebetoechiidae.	
Notoconchidium talenti	Sp. nov	Valid	Wright & Garratt	Late Silurian	Mount Ida Formation	Australia	A member of Rhynchonellida belonging to the family Hebetoechiidae.	
Ochyromena	Gen. et sp. nov	Valid	Zhan et al.	Ordovician (Dapingian)	Daguanshan Formation	China	A member of Strophomenoidea belonging to the family Strophomenidae. The type species is O. plana.	
Odonovania	Gen. et sp. nov	Valid	Waterhouse	Permian (Changhsingian)	Marsyangdi Formation	Nepal	A member of Productida belonging to the family Paucispiniferidae. The type species is O. dorsospinosa.	
Opiparia	Gen. et comb. nov	Valid	Waterhouse	Permian (Roadian)	Rat Buri Limestone	Thailand	A member of Productida belonging to the family Paucispiniferidae. The type species is Kozlowskia" opipara Grant (1976).	
Paralenorthis costata	Sp. nov	Valid	Zhan et al.	Ordovician (Darriwilian)	Chiatsun Group	China	A member of the family Orthidae.	
Parasentosia	Gen. et comb. nov	Valid	Waterhouse	Carboniferous (Tournaisian)	Glen Park Formation	United States (Illinois)	A member of Productida belonging to the family Sentosiidae. The type species is "Sentosia" ignota Carter (1988).	
Parvuliella	Gen. et comb. nov	Valid	Waterhouse	Permian (Capitanian)		Russia	A member of Productida belonging to group Lyttoniidina and the family Loczyellidae. The type species is Loczyella" parvula Licharew (1930).	
Patellamia	Gen. et 2 sp. nov	Valid	Waterhouse	Permian (Capitanian)	Trold Fiord Formation	Canada	A member of Productida belonging to the family Waagenoconchidae. The type species is P. confinis; genus also includes P. sulcata.	
Piyasinia	Gen. et comb. nov	Valid	Waterhouse	Permian (Changhsingian)	Huai Tak Formation	Thailand	A member of Productida belonging to the family Costispiniferidae. The type species is "Spinomarginifera" plana Waterhouse (1983)	
Plectothyrella? itacurubiensis	Sp. nov	Valid	Benedetto, Halpern & Inchausti	Late Ordovician (Hirnantian)	Eusebio Ayala Formation	Paraguay	Possibly a species of Plectothyrella.	
Plicosentosia	Gen. et comb. nov	Valid	Waterhouse	Devonian (Famennian)	Myrtlevale Formation	Australia	A member of Productida belonging to the family Sentosiidae. The type species is "Sentosia" plicata McKellar (1970).	
Praelaminatia	Gen. et comb. nov	Valid	Waterhouse	Devonian (Famennian)	Myrtlevale Formation	Australia	A member of Productida belonging to the family Echinoconchidae. The type species is "Laminatia" jacki McKellar (1970).	
Praeschrenkiella	Gen. et 2 sp. nov	Valid	Waterhouse	Carboniferous (Gzhelian)	Jungle Creek Formation	Canada (Yukon)	A member of Productida belonging to the family Schrenkiellidae. The type species is P. waddingtonae; genus also includes P. costata.	
Primotimena	Gen. et sp. nov	Valid	Zhan et al.	Ordovician (Dapingian)	Daguanshan Formation	China	A member of Strophomenoidea belonging to the family Glyptomenidae. The type species is P. globula.	
Proclinorthis	Gen. et sp. nov	Valid	Colmenar, Villas & Vizcaïno	Late Ordovician	Glauzy Formation	France	A platyorthid. The type species is Proclinorthis vailhanensis.	
Proteusiella	Gen. et comb. nov	Valid	Waterhouse	Devonian (Famennian)		Australia	A member of Productida belonging to the family Productellidae. The type species is "Avonia" proteus Veevers (1959).	
Pseudocrania insperata	Sp. nov	Valid	Bassett et al.	Middle Ordovician (Darriwilian)	Lashkarak Formation	Iran	A member of Craniida, a species of Pseudocrania.	
Pupiaoia	Gen. et sp. nov	Valid	Xu	Ordovician (late Darriwilian)	Shihtien Formation	China	A member of Orthoidea belonging to the new family Pupiaoiidae. The type species is P. pupiaoensis.	
Putapustula	Gen. et comb. nov	Valid	Waterhouse	Carboniferous (Tournaisian)	Bingleburra Formation	Australia	A member of Productida belonging to the family Waagenoconchidae. The type species is "Pustula" multispinata Roberts (1963).	
Putusia	Gen. et comb. nov	Valid	Waterhouse	Carboniferous	St. Joe Formation	Canada (Alberta); United States (Oklahoma)	A member of Productida belonging to the family Waagenoconchidae. The type species is "Pustula" oklahomae Carter (1999); genus also includes "Pustula" morrocreekensis Carter (1987).	
Quadralosia	Gen. et sp. nov	Valid	Waterhouse	Carboniferous	Hart River Formation	Canada (Yukon)	A member of Productida belonging to the family Chonopectidae. The type species is Q. delicata.	
Quasimingenewia	Gen. et sp. nov	Valid	Waterhouse	Permian (Changhsingian)	Manang Group	Nepal	A member of Productida belonging to the family Ctenalosiidae. The type species is Q. imperator.	
Quospina	Gen. et comb. nov	Valid	Waterhouse	Carboniferous (Viséan)		Australia	A member of Productida belonging to the family Paucispiniferidae. The type species is Productina" morrisi Roberts (1976).	
Ramaliconcha	Gen. et 2 sp. nov	Valid	Waterhouse	Carboniferous (Gzhelian) to Permian (Sakmarian)	Jungle Creek Formation	Canada (Yukon)	A member of Productida belonging to the family Rhamnariidae. The type species is R. bitteri; genus also includes R. guryulensis from Kashmir.	
Rangaria	Gen. et comb. nov	Valid	Waterhouse	Carboniferous (Tournaisian)	Rangari Limestone	Australia	A member of Productida belonging to the family Araksalosiidae. The type species is "Acanthatia" rangariensis Campbell & Engel (1963).	
Repinia	Gen. et comb. nov	Valid	Waterhouse	Permian (Capitanian)		Russia	A member of Productida belonging to the family Stepanoviellidae. The type species is "Cancrinella" repini Zavodowsky (1960).	
Retiarisia	Gen. et comb. nov	Valid	Waterhouse	Carboniferous (Tournaisian)		Australia	A member of Productida belonging to the family Dictyoclostidae. The type species is "Dictyoclostus" simplex Campbell (1957); genus also includes "Dictyoclostus" paradoxus Campbell (1957).	
Reticulatia oldershawi	Sp. nov	Valid	Waterhouse	Carboniferous (Gzhelian)	Jungle Creek Formation	Canada (Nunavut)	A member of Productida belonging to the family Retariidae.	
Reticulumia	Gen. et comb. nov	Valid	Waterhouse	Carboniferous (Bashkirian)	Branch Creek Formation	Australia	A member of Productida belonging to the family Dictyoclostidae. The type species is "Reticulatia" cinctifera Roberts (1976).	
Robertsina	Gen. et comb. nov	Valid	Waterhouse	Carboniferous (Viséan)	Bennington Siltstone	Australia	A member of Productida belonging to the family Retariidae. The type species is "Marginatia" patersonensis Roberts (1965).	
Rugania	Gen. et comb. nov	Valid	Waterhouse	Permian		United States (Texas)	A member of Productida belonging to the family Paucispinauriidae. The type species is "Cancrinella" subquadrata Cooper & Grant (1975).	
Sangredonia	Gen. et comb. nov	Valid	Waterhouse	Carboniferous	La Pasad Formation	United States (New Mexico)	A member of Productida belonging to the family Horridoniidae. The type species is "Horridonia" daltonensis Sutherland & Harlow (1973).	
Sapelnikoviella	Gen. et sp. nov	Valid	Blodgett et al.	Silurian (Ludlow)		United States	A gypidulinid brachiopod. Genus includes new species S. santuccii.	
Sartenaeria	Gen. et comb. nov	Valid	Waterhouse	Carboniferous (Viséan)		Belgium	A member of Productida belonging to the family Proboscidellidae. The type species is "Productus" koninckianus Verneuil (1845).	
Septumusia	Gen. et comb. nov	Valid	Waterhouse	Permian (Wuchiapingian)	Wargal Formation	Pakistan	A member of Productida belonging to the family Echinoconchidae. The type species is "Productus (Tschernyschewia)" vicinalis Reed (1944).	
Shuangheella	Gen. et sp. nov	Valid	Zhan et al.	Ordovician (Dapingian)	Daguanshan Formation	China	A member of Strophomenoidea belonging to the family Rafinesquinidae. The type species is S. elongata.	
Shumardoria	Gen. et comb. nov	Valid	Waterhouse	Permian (Capitanian)	Capitan Formation	United States (New Mexico)	A member of Productida belonging to the family Rhamnariidae. The type species is "Aulosteges" guadalupensis Shumard (1860).	
Sierradiabloa	Gen. et comb. nov	Valid	Waterhouse	Permian (Artinskian)	Bone Spring Formation	United States (Texas)	A member of Productida belonging to the family Tschernyschewiidae. The type species is "Tschernyschewia" americana Cooper & Grant (1975).	
Sphenope	Gen. et comb. et sp. nov	Valid	Vörös	Late Jurassic to Early Cretaceous (Tithonian to Berriasian)		Hungary; Italy	A pygopid terebratulid. A new genus for "Terebratula" misilmerensis Gemmellaro (1871); genus also contains the new species Sphenope bifida.	
Spinauricula	Gen. et comb. nov	Valid	Waterhouse	Devonian (Famennian)	Myrtlevale Formation	Australia	A member of Productida belonging to the family Sentosiidae. The type species is "Sentosia" profunda McKellar (1970).	
Spinellicosta	Gen. et comb. nov	Valid	Waterhouse	Devonian (Famennian)	Myrtlevale Formation	Australia	A member of Productida belonging to the family Productellidae. The type species is "Spinulicosta" dotswoodae McKellar (1970).	
Stainbrookia	Gen. et comb. nov	Junior homonym	Waterhouse	Carboniferous (Mississippian)	Aplington Formation	United States (Iowa)	A member of Productida belonging to the family Caucasiproductidae. The type species is "Strophalosia" butlerensis Stainbrook (1950). The generic name is preoccupied by Stainbrookia Cooper & Dubro (1982).	
Strophalosiaria	Gen. et comb. nov	Valid	Waterhouse	Permian (Asselian)	Kansas Creek Formation	Australia	A member of Productida belonging to the family Strophalosiidae. The type species is "Strophalosia" concentrica Clarke (1990).	
Sulcatospira simplex	Sp. nov	Valid	Rong et al.	Silurian (Rhuddanian)		China	A member of Atrypida belonging to the family Atrypidae.	
Sutherlandika	Gen. et comb. nov	Valid	Waterhouse	Carboniferous	La Pasada Formation	United States (New Mexico)	A member of Productida belonging to the family Paucispiniferidae. The type species is Kozlowskia" montgomeryi Sutherland & Harlow (1973).	
Taboadaia	Gen. et comb. nov	Valid	Waterhouse	Carboniferous (Viséan)	San Eduardo Formation	Argentina	A member of Productida belonging to the family Overtoniidae. The type species is "Absenticosta" bruntoneileenae Taboada & Shi (2011).	
Tapajosia	Gen. et comb. nov	Junior homonym	Waterhouse	Carboniferous (Bashkirian)	Itaituba Formation	Brazil	A member of Productida belonging to the family Linoproductidae. The type species is "Linoproductus" caima Chen, Tazawa & Shi in Chen et al. (2004). The generic name is preoccupied by Tapajosia Townsend (1934).	
Tethyochonetes cheni	Sp. nov	Valid	Zhang et al.	Late Permian (Changhsingian)		China	A member of Rugosochonetidae, a species of Tethyochonetes.	
Tethyochonetes sheni	Sp. nov	Valid	Zhang et al.	Late Permian (Changhsingian)		China	A member of Rugosochonetidae, a species of Tethyochonetes.	
Titanisia	Gen. et comb. nov	Valid	Waterhouse	Permian (Kungurian)	Skinner Ranch Formation	United States (Texas)	A member of Productida belonging to the family Scacchinellidae. The type species is "Scacchinella" titan Cooper & Grant (1975).	
Tityrophoria zimmermani	Sp. nov	Valid	Waterhouse	Carboniferous (Gzhelian)	Jungle Creek Formation	Canada (Yukon)	A member of Productida belonging to the family Dictyoclostidae.	
Tortilisia	Gen. et comb. nov	Valid	Waterhouse	Carboniferous		Ireland; United Kingdom	A member of Productida belonging to the family Proboscidellidae. The type species is "Producta" tortilis M'Coy (1844).	
Tubersulcus reidi	Sp. nov	Valid	Waterhouse	Permian (Asselian)	Jungle Creek Formation	Canada (Yukon)	A member of Productida belonging to the family Sentosiidae.	
Umaria	Gen. et comb. nov	Valid	Waterhouse	Permian (Sakmarian)	Umaria Coal Measures	India	A member of Productida belonging to the family Auriculispinidae. The type species is "Productus" umariensis Reed (1928).	
Vagarea	Gen. et comb. nov	Valid	Waterhouse	Permian (Kungurian)	Cathedral Mountain Formation	United States (Texas)	A member of Productida belonging to the family Paucispinauriidae. The type species is "Grandaurispina" vaga Cooper & Grant (1975).	
Waggononia	Gen. et comb. nov	Valid	Waterhouse	Carboniferous (Tournaisian)		Australia	A member of Productida belonging to the family Avoniidae. The type species is "Protoniella" waggonensis Roberts (1971).	
Yacotania	Gen. et comb. nov	Valid	Waterhouse	Permian (Asselian)	Copacabana Formation	Bolivia	A member of Productida belonging to the family Dictyoclostidae. The type species is "Reticulatia" globosa Samtleben (1971).	
Yanagidania	Gen. et comb. nov	Valid	Waterhouse	Carboniferous (Moscovian)	Khao Luak beds	Thailand	A member of Productida belonging to the family Paucispiniferidae. The type species is "Desmoinesia" prayongi Yanagida (1975).	
Yuhangella	Gen. et sp. nov	Valid	Rong et al.	Ordovician (Hirnantian) and Silurian (Rhuddanian)	Anji Formation; Yankou Formation	China	A member of Dalmanelloidea belonging to the family Dalmanellidae. The type species is Y. yui.	

== Echinoderms ==
Name	Novelty	Status	Authors	Age	Unit	Location	Notes	Images
Abertella miskellyi	Sp. nov	Valid	Kroh et al.	Miocene	Camarones Formation	Argentina	An abertellid sand dollar, a species of Abertella.	
Alternacantha	Gen. et 4 sp. nov	Valid	Thuy & Meyer	Jurassic (Toarcian to Kimmeridgian)	Chari Formation	France; India; Switzerland; Morocco?	An ophiacanthid brittle star. The type species is Alternacantha occulta; genus also includes A. schwermannorum, A. arges and A. dilionessa.	
Aragocystites	Gen. et sp. nov	Valid	Zamora	Middle Cambrian	Murero Formation	Spain	An edrioasteroid. The type species is Aragocystites belli.	
Bathyovulaster	Gen. et sp. nov	Valid	Smith	Santonian		Italy	A spatangoid. The type species is Bathyovulaster disjunctus.	
Bellastrella	Gen. et sp. nov	Valid	Müller, Hahn and Bohatý	Middle Devonian		Germany	An agelacrinitid edrioasteroid. The type species is Bellastrella eifeliana.	
Ctenocrinus branisai	Sp. nov	Valid	Thompson, Ausich & Smith	Early Devonian (Emsian)	Belèn Formation	Bolivia	A crinoid, a species of Ctenocrinus.	
Cyclolampas altus	Sp. nov	Valid	Saucede et al.	Middle Jurassic (late Callovian)		France	An echinoid, a species of Cyclolampas.	
Dermacantha	Gen. et 3 sp. et comb. nov	Valid	Thuy	Jurassic (Hettangian to Kimmeridgian)		Belgium; France; Germany; Luxembourg; United Kingdom	A brittle star belonging to the family Ophiacanthidae. The type species is D. leonorae; genus also includes new species D. pattyana and D. carli, as well as "Ophiocten" seeweni Kutscher & Hary (1991).	
Dermocoma faberi	Sp. nov	Valid	Thuy	Early Jurassic (Hettangian)		Belgium; Luxembourg	A brittle star belonging to the family Ophiacanthidae.	
Dermocoma longwyensis	Sp. nov	Valid	Thuy	Middle Jurassic (Bajocian)		France	A brittle star belonging to the family Ophiacanthidae.	
Dermocoma numbergerorum	Sp. nov	Valid	Thuy	Late Jurassic (Oxfordian)		France	A brittle star belonging to the family Ophiacanthidae.	
Dermocoma potti	Sp. nov	Valid	Thuy	Early Jurassic (Pliensbachian)		France	A brittle star belonging to the family Ophiacanthidae.	
Dermocoma simonschneideri	Sp. nov	Valid	Thuy	Late Jurassic (Kimmeridgian)	Amaral Formation; La Pointe du Chay	France; Portugal	A brittle star belonging to the family Ophiacanthidae.	
Eolaxoporus	Gen. et 2 sp. nov	Valid	Thuy	Triassic (Anisian and Carnian) and Early Jurassic (late Sinemurian to early Pliensbachian)	Cassian Formation; Hanwang Formation; Trochitenkalk Formation	Austria; China; Germany; Italy	A brittle star belonging to the family Ophiacanthidae. The type species is E. hagdorni; genus also includes E. imminens.	
Eozonella	Gen. et sp. nov	Valid	Thuy, Marty & Comment	Late Jurassic (late Oxfordian)		Switzerland	An ophiolepidid brittle star. The type species is Eozonella bergeri.	
Europacantha	Gen. et sp. nov	Valid	Thuy	Middle Triassic (Anisian)	Felsöörs Formation	Hungary	A brittle star belonging to the family Ophiacanthidae. The type species is E. paciphila.	
Geromura	Gen. et 2 sp. nov	Valid	Thuy	Middle Jurassic (Bajocian-Bathonian boundary) to Early Cretaceous (Valanginian)		Austria; France	A brittle star belonging to the family Ophiacanthidae. The type species is G. teckliformis; genus also includes G. touertensis.	
Graciacystis	Gen. et sp. nov	Valid	Zamora, Rahman & Smith	Middle Cambrian		Spain	A basal cinctan echinoderm. The type species is Graciacystis ambigua.	
Griphocrinus pirovanoi	Sp. nov	Valid	Thompson, Ausich & Smith	Early Devonian (Emsian)	Icla Formation	Bolivia	A crinoid, a species of Griphocrinus.	
Hanshessia	Gen. et sp. nov	Valid	Thuy & Meyer	Early and Middle Jurassic	Chari Formation	Austria; France; Germany; India; Switzerland	An ophiacanthid brittle star. The type species is Hanshessia trochitophila.	
Inexpectacantha ritae	Sp. nov	Valid	Thuy	Early Jurassic (Hettangian)		Belgium; Luxembourg	A brittle star belonging to the family Ophiacanthidae.	
Inexpectacantha weisi	Sp. nov	Valid	Thuy	Early Jurassic (Hettangian to Sinemurian)		Belgium; Luxembourg	A brittle star belonging to the family Ophiacanthidae.	
Ishidacantha	Gen. et comb. et 2 sp. nov	Valid	Thuy	Jurassic (Toarcian to Oxfordian)	Chari Formation	France; Germany; India	A brittle star belonging to the family Ophiacanthidae. The type species is "Ophiopholis" trispinosa Hess (1965); genus also includes new species I. hirokoae and I. fuersichi.	
Juracantha	Gen. et sp. nov	Valid	Thuy, Marty & Comment	Late Jurassic (late Oxfordian)		Switzerland	An ophiacanthid brittle star. The type species is Juracantha hottingeri.	
Kosachenkoastrus	Gen. et sp. nov	Valid	Rozhnov	Middle Ordovician		Russia	A member of Parablastoidea. The type species is Kosachenkoastrus volkhovensis.	
Krohcoma	Gen. et 2 sp. nov	Valid	Thuy	Jurassic (late Sinemurian to Kimmeridgian)	Amaral Formation; La Pointe du Chay; Patcham Formation	Austria; France; India; Portugal	A brittle star belonging to the family Ophiacanthidae. The type species is K. mira; genus also includes K. ampla.	
Lapidaster	Gen. et 9 sp. et comb. nov	Valid	Thuy	Jurassic and Early Cretaceous (late Sinemurian to Albian)	Bärschwil Formation; Chari Formation	Austria; France; Germany; India; Switzerland; United Kingdom	A brittle star belonging to the family Ophiacanthidae. The type species is L. hystricarboris; genus also includes L. caeloscopus, L. coreytaylori, L. etteri, L. lukenederi, L. mastodon, L. mathcore, L. wolfii and L. varuna, as well as "Sinosura" fasciata Kutscher & Villier (2003).	
Lutocrinus	Gen. et sp. nov	Valid	Thompson, Ausich & Smith	Early Devonian (Emsian)	Icla Formation	Bolivia	A crinoid. The type species is Lutocrinus boliviaensis.	
Magnuscrinus kammeri	Sp. nov	Valid	Krivicich, Ausich & Keyes	Carboniferous (Viséan)	Fort Payne Formation	United States	A crinoid.	
Manfredura	Gen. et comb. nov	Valid	Thuy	Late Cretaceous (Maastrichtian)		Germany	A brittle star belonging to the family Ophiacanthidae. The type species is "Ophiomyxa" curvata Kutscher & Jagt (2000).	
Megaradialocrinus dorotheakochae	Sp. nov	Valid	Bohatý & Hein	Devonian		Germany	A camerate crinoid belonging to the group Monobathrida and the family Hexacrinitidae.	
Nanocarpus guoleensis	Sp. nov	Valid	Chen & Han	Cambrian (Furongian)	Guole Formation	China	A member of Stylophora.	
Ophiocamax dorotheae	Sp. nov	Valid	Thuy	Late Jurassic (Oxfordian)		France; Switzerland	A brittle star belonging to the family Ophiacanthidae.	
Ophiacantha jaegeri	Sp. nov	Valid	Thuy	Early Cretaceous (Hauterivian)		Germany	A brittle star belonging to the family Ophiacanthidae.	
Ophiacantha reginae	Sp. nov	Valid	Thuy	Late Cretaceous (late Campanian)		Germany	A brittle star belonging to the family Ophiacanthidae.	
Ophiacantha steffenschneideri	Sp. nov	Valid	Thuy	Oligocene (Rupelian)		Germany	A brittle star belonging to the family Ophiacanthidae.	
Ophiogaleus	Gen. et comb. et sp. nov	Valid	Thuy	Jurassic and Cretaceous (late Sinemurian to Maastrichtian)	Agardhfjellet Formation Chari Formation	Austria; Belgium; Denmark; France; Germany; India; Norway; Switzerland	A brittle star belonging to the family Ophiacanthidae. The type species is "Ophiacantha" constricta Hess (1966); genus also includes "Ophiacantha" danica Rasmussen (1952) and "Ophiacantha" dorecki Hess (1962), as well as new species O. stans.	
Ophiojagtus	Gen. et 2 sp. et comb. nov	Valid	Thuy	Late Jurassic and Cretaceous (Oxfordian to Maastrichtian)	Amaral Formation; La Pointe du Chay	Belgium; France; Germany; Portugal; Switzerland; United States	A brittle star belonging to the family Ophiacanthidae. The type species is O. acklesi; genus also includes new species O. irimurai, as well as "Hemieuryale" argoviensis Hess (1966) and "Ophiosmilax" alternatus Kutscher & Jagt (2000).	
Ophioleviathan	Gen. et sp. nov	Valid	Thuy	Early Jurassic (late Sinemurian to late Pliensbachian)		Austria; Switzerland	A brittle star belonging to the family Ophiacanthidae. The type species is O. watsoni.	
Ophiolimna kucerai	Sp. nov	Valid	Thuy	Early Cretaceous (latest Aptian to earliest Albian)		Atlantic Ocean (Blake Nose)	A brittle star belonging to the family Ophiacanthidae.	
Ophiolimna lisae	Sp. nov	Valid	Thuy	Late Jurassic (Kimmeridgian)	Amaral Formation; La Pointe du Chay	France; Portugal	A brittle star belonging to the family Ophiacanthidae.	
Ophiolimna malagasica	Sp. nov	Valid	Thuy	Middle Jurassic (Bathonian to Callovian)	Patcham Formation	India	A brittle star belonging to the family Ophiacanthidae.	
Ophiolimna tiamatia	Sp. nov	Valid	Thuy	Early Jurassic (late Sinemurian to early Pliensbachian)		Austria	A brittle star belonging to the family Ophiacanthidae.	
Ophiologimus aiodipius	Sp. nov	Valid	Thuy	Early Cretaceous (latest Aptian to earliest Albian)		Atlantic Ocean (Blake Nose)	A brittle star belonging to the family Ophiacanthidae.	
Ophiologimus martynovi	Sp. nov	Valid	Thuy	Early Cretaceous (latest Aptian to earliest Albian)		Atlantic Ocean (Blake Nose)	A brittle star belonging to the family Ophiacanthidae.	
Ophiomalleus	Gen. et 2 sp. nov	Valid	Thuy	Middle Jurassic (Callovian) to Early Cretaceous (Hauterivian)		Germany	A brittle star belonging to the family Ophiacanthidae. The type species is O. beneficarum; genus also includes O. stevenwilsoni.	
Ophiosternle	Gen. et comb. nov	Valid	Thuy & Schulz	Late Jurassic (Kimmeridgian)	Mergelstetten Formation	Germany	A brittle star belonging to the family Ophiacanthidae. The type species is "Ophiurites" crinitus Quenstedt (1876).	
Ophiotholia aurora	Sp. nov	Valid	Thuy & Meyer	Middle Jurassic		Switzerland	An ophiomycetid brittle star, a species of Ophiotholia.	
Ophiotoma charlottae	Sp. nov	Valid	Thuy	Late Jurassic (Kimmeridgian)		France	A brittle star belonging to the family Ophiacanthidae.	
Ophiotoma incredibilis	Sp. nov	Valid	Thuy	Early Cretaceous (latest Aptian to earliest Albian)		Atlantic Ocean (Blake Nose)	A brittle star belonging to the family Ophiacanthidae.	
Ophiotoma vadosa	Sp. nov	Valid	Thuy	Early Jurassic (Pliensbachian)		Switzerland; United Kingdom	A brittle star belonging to the family Ophiacanthidae.	
Ophiotreta dendrophyllicola	Sp. nov	Valid	Thuy	Paleocene (Danian)		Denmark	A brittle star belonging to the family Ophiacanthidae.	
Ophiotreta hedone	Sp. nov	Valid	Thuy	Eocene (Lutetian)		France	A brittle star belonging to the family Ophiacanthidae.	
Ophiotreta stefaniae	Sp. nov	Valid	Thuy	Late Jurassic (Oxfordian)		Germany	A brittle star belonging to the family Ophiacanthidae.	
Protoscutella palmeri	Sp. nov	Valid	Osborn, Mooi & Ciampaglio	Eocene (Lutetian)	Santee Limestone	United States	A sand dollar belonging to the group Scutellina and the family Protoscutellidae.	
Regulaecystis testudineus	Sp nov	Valid	Nardin & Bohatý	Devonian (Eifelian)		Germany	A blastozoan belonging to the family Pleurocystitidae.	
Reitneracantha	Gen. et sp. nov	Valid	Thuy	Early Jurassic (late Sinemurian to early Pliensbachian)		Austria	A brittle star belonging to the family Ophiacanthidae. The type species is R. dissidens.	
Rhenopyrgus piojoensis	Sp nov	Valid	Sumrall, Heredia, Rodríguez & Mestre	Silurian (lower Ludlow)	Los Espejos Formation	Argentina	A rhenopyrgid edrioasteroid, a species of Rhenopyrgus.	
Sabinacantha	Gen. et sp. nov	Valid	Thuy	Late Jurassic (Oxfordian)		Germany	A brittle star belonging to the family Ophiacanthidae. The type species is S. archetypa.	
Simakocrinus	Gen. et 2 sp. nov.	Valid	Prokop	Devonian (Pragian, Emsian and Eifelian)		Czech Republic	A crinoid belonging to the group Disparida, possibly a member of the family Myelodactylidae. The type species is Simakocrinus facilis sp. nov (col.); genus also contains Simakocrinus diligens sp. nov (col.).	

== Conodonts ==
Name	Novelty	Status	Authors	Age	Unit	Location	Notes	Images
Acanthodus humachensis	Sp nov	Valid	Zeballo & Albanesi	Late Cambrian (late Furongian) or early Ordovician (Tremadocian)	Santa Rosita Formation	Argentina	A species of Acanthodus.	
Acanthodus raqueli	Sp nov	Valid	Zeballo & Albanesi	Late Cambrian (late Furongian) or early Ordovician (Tremadocian)	Santa Rosita Formation	Argentina	A species of Acanthodus.	
Acodus primitivus	Sp nov	Valid	Zeballo & Albanesi	Late Cambrian (late Furongian) or early Ordovician (Tremadocian)	Santa Rosita Formation	Argentina	A species of Acodus.	
Acuminatella	Gen. et 2 sp. nov	Valid	Orchard	Late Triassic (late Carnian to early Norian)	Pardonet Formation	Canada	A gondolellid ozarkodinid. The type species is Acuminatella acuminata; genus also contains Acuminatella angusta.	
Bispathodus ultimus bartzschi	Subsp nov	Valid	Kononova & Weyer	Devonian (late Famennian)		Germany	A subspecies of Bispathodus ultimus.	
Carnepigondolella eozoae	Sp. nov	Valid	Orchard	Late Triassic (late Carnian)	Ludington Formation	Canada	A gondolellid ozarkodinid, a species of Carnepigondolella.	
Carnepigondolella medioconstricta	Sp. nov	Valid	Orchard	Late Triassic (late Carnian)	Ludington Formation	Canada	A gondolellid ozarkodinid, a species of Carnepigondolella.	
Furnishina leei	Sp. nov	Valid	Lee	Cambrian	Machari Formation	South Korea		
Histiodella wuhaiensis	Sp. nov	Valid	Wang et al.	Ordovician	Lower Klimoli Formation	China		
Idiognathodus craticulinodosus	Sp. nov	Valid	Ishida, Suzuki & Inada	Carboniferous (middle–late Bashkirian to early Moscovian)	Ko-yama Limestone Group	Japan		
Idiognathodus heckeli	Sp. nov	Valid	Rosscoe & Barrick	Carboniferous	Exline Limestone; Hertha Limestone; Hushpuckney Shale; Lower Brush Creek Shale	United States		
Idiognathodus papulatus	Sp. nov	Valid	Rosscoe & Barrick	Carboniferous	Hushpuckney Shale; Lower Brush Creek Shale	United States		
Idiognathodus pseudocarinatus	Sp. nov	Valid	Rosscoe & Barrick	Carboniferous	Hushpuckney Shale; Lower Brush Creek Shale	United States		
Kallidontus gondwanicus	Sp nov	Valid	Zeballo & Albanesi	Late Cambrian (late Furongian) or early Ordovician (Tremadocian)	Santa Rosita Formation	Argentina	A species of Kallidontus.	
Kraussodontus	Gen. et sp. nov	Valid	Orchard	Late Triassic (late Carnian)	Pardonet Formation	Canada	A gondolellid ozarkodinid. The type species is Kraussodontus peteri.	
Mesogondolella daheshenensis	Sp nov	Valid	Wang in Zhou et al.	Permian (probably Wordian)	Daheshen Formation	China	A species of Mesogondolella.	
Mesogondolella subgracilis	Sp nov	Valid	Wang in Zhou et al.	Permian (probably Wordian)	Daheshen Formation	China	A species of Mesogondolella.	
Metapolygnathus mazzai	Sp. nov	Valid	Karádi, Kozur & Görögt	Late Triassic (late Carnian and early Norian)	Csővár Limestone Formation	Hungary; Italy		
Muellerilepis	Nom. nov	Valid	Bardashev & Bardasheva	Middle Devonian (Givetian)		Tajikistan	A replacement name for Muellerina Bardashev & Bardasheva (2012) (preoccupied).	
Naimanodus	Gen. et sp. nov	Valid	Tolmacheva	Middle Ordovician		Kazakhstan; Kyrgyzstan; Russia	The type species is Naimanodus degtyarevi.	
Neopolygnathus margaretae	Sp nov	Valid	Kononova & Weyer	Devonian (late Famennian)		Germany	A species of Neopolygnathus.	
Notiodella	Gen. et sp. nov	Valid	Aldridge et al.	Late Ordovician	Soom Shale Member, Cedarberg Formation	South Africa	A member of Prioniodontida belonging to the family Balognathidae. The type species is Notiodella keblon.	
Oncodella mostleri	Sp. nov	Valid	Karádi, Kozur & Görögt	Late Triassic (early Norian)	Csővár Limestone Formation	Hungary		
Palmatolepis khaensis	Sp. nov	Valid	Savage	Late Devonian		Thailand		
Palmatolepis marki	Sp. nov	Valid	Savage	Late Devonian		Thailand		
Palmatolepis subperlobata lapoensis	Subsp. nov	Valid	Savage	Late Devonian		Thailand		
Parapetella	Gen. et sp. nov	Valid	Orchard	Late Triassic (late Carnian to early Norian)	Pardonet Formation	Canada	A gondolellid ozarkodinid. The type species is Parapetella prominens.	
Polygnathus burretti	Sp. nov	Valid	Savage	Late Devonian		Thailand		
Polygnathus communis hanensis	Subsp. nov	Valid	Savage	Late Devonian		Thailand		
Polygnathus communis namdipensis	Subsp. nov	Valid	Savage	Late Devonian		Thailand		
Polygnathus communis phaphaensis	Subsp. nov	Valid	Savage	Late Devonian		Thailand		
Polygnathus crassulus salapensis	Subsp. nov	Valid	Savage	Late Devonian		Thailand		
Polygnathus extralobatus phoensis	Subsp. nov	Valid	Savage	Late Devonian		Thailand		
Polygnathus hojedki	Sp. nov	Valid	Gholamalian et al.	Devonian		Iran	A species of Polygnathus.	
Polygnathus pseudocostatus	Sp nov	Valid	Klapper & Vodrážková	Devonian		United States	A species of Polygnathus.	
Primatella	Gen. et comb. et 2 sp. nov	Valid	Orchard	Late Triassic (late Carnian to early Norian)	Pardonet Formation	Canada	A gondolellid ozarkodinid. A new genus for "Epigondolella" primitia Mosher (1970); genus also contains new species Primatella asymmetrica and Primatella conservativa.	
Pseudopolygnathus granulosus laepensis	Subsp. nov	Valid	Savage	Late Devonian		Thailand		
Pseudopolygnathus granulosus salawinensis	Subsp. nov	Valid	Savage	Late Devonian		Thailand		
Pseudopolygnathus maepoensis	Sp. nov	Valid	Savage	Late Devonian		Thailand		
Quadralella	Gen. et sp. nov	Valid	Orchard	Late Triassic (late Carnian)	Ludington Formation	Canada	A gondolellid ozarkodinid. The type species is Quadralella lobata.	
Siphonodella banraiensis	Sp. nov	Valid	Savage	Late Devonian		Thailand		
Tilcarodus	Gen. et comb. nov	Valid	Zeballo & Albanesi	Early Ordovician	Rupasca Formation	Argentina	A new genus for "Utahconus" humahuacensis Albanesi and Aceñolaza (2005).	
Trapezognathus? primitivus	Sp. nov	Valid	Voldman, Albanesi & Zeballo in Voldman et al.	Early Ordovician	Acoite Formation	Argentina	Originally described as a possible species of Trapezognathus; subsequently made the type species of a separate genus Zentagnathus.	
Utahconus purmamarcensis	Sp nov	Valid	Zeballo & Albanesi	Late Cambrian (late Furongian) or early Ordovician (Tremadocian)	Santa Rosita Formation	Argentina	A species of Utahconus.	
Utahconus scandodiformis	Sp nov	Valid	Zeballo & Albanesi	Late Cambrian (late Furongian) or early Ordovician (Tremadocian)	Santa Rosita Formation	Argentina	A species of Utahconus.	
Utahconus tortibasis	Sp nov	Valid	Zeballo & Albanesi	Late Cambrian (late Furongian) or early Ordovician (Tremadocian)	Santa Rosita Formation	Argentina	A species of Utahconus.	
Variabiloconus crassus	Sp nov	Valid	Zeballo & Albanesi	Late Cambrian (late Furongian) or early Ordovician (Tremadocian)	Santa Rosita Formation	Argentina	A species of Variabiloconus.	

== Amphibians ==
=== Research ===
- Laloy et al. (2013) reinterpret the Eocene frog species Rana cadurcorum from the Quercy Phosphorites (France) as a junior synonym of Thaumastosaurus gezei.

=== Newly named temnospondyls ===
Name	Novelty	Status	Authors	Age	Unit	Location	Notes	Images
Broiliellus reiszi	Sp. nov	Valid	Holmes, Berman & Anderson	Early Permian	El Cobre Canyon Formation	United States	A dissorophid, a species of Broiliellus.	
Parotosuchus ptaszynskii	Sp nov	Valid	Sulej & Niedźwiedzki	Late Olenekian		Poland	A species of Parotosuchus.	
Reiszerpeton	Gen. et sp. nov	Valid	Maddin et al.	Early Permian	Archer City Formation	United States	A dissorophid. The type species is Reiszerpeton renascentis.	
Scapanops	Gen. et sp. nov	Valid	Schoch & Sues	Early Permian	Nocona Formation	United States	A dissorophid. The type species is Scapanops neglecta.	
Tersomius dolesensis	Sp nov	Valid	Anderson & Bolt	Early Permian		United States	A species of Tersomius.	
Trimerorhachis greggi	Sp nov	Valid	Milner & Schoch	Early Permian		United States	A species of Trimerorhachis.	

=== Newly named lepospondyls ===
Name	Novelty	Status	Authors	Age	Unit	Location	Notes	Images
Batropetes niederkirchensis	Sp. nov	Valid	Glienke	Early Permian (Rotliegend)	Saar–Nahe Basin	Germany	A species of Batropetes.	
Huskerpeton	Gen. et sp. nov	Valid	Huttenlocker et al.	Early Permian	Eskridge Formation	United States	A recumbirostran. The type species is Huskerpeton englehorni.	
Proxilodon	Gen. et comb. nov	Valid	Huttenlocker et al.	Early Permian	Speiser Formation	United States	A recumbirostran, a new genus for "Euryodus" bonneri.	

=== Newly named lissamphibians ===
Name	Novelty	Status	Authors	Age	Unit	Location	Notes	Images
Aerugoamnis	Gen. et sp. nov	Valid	Henrici, Báez & Grande	Early Eocene (Wasatchian)	Green River Formation	United States	A relative of parsley frogs. The type species is Aerugoamnis paulus.	
Eobarbourula	Gen. et sp. nov	Valid	Folie et al.	Early Eocene	Cambay Shale Formation	India	A bombinatorid. Its type species is Eobarbourula delfinoi.	
Gracilibatrachus	Gen. et sp. nov	Valid	Báez	Early Cretaceous (late Barremian)		Spain	A relative of the family Pipidae. The type species is Gracilibatrachus avallei.	
Iberobatrachus	Gen. et sp. nov	Valid	Báez	Early Cretaceous (late Barremian)		Spain	A close relative of the genus Discoglossus. The type species is Iberobatrachus angelae.	
Ichthyosaura randeckensis	Sp. nov	Valid	Schoch & Rasser	Miocene		Germany	A newt related to the Alpine newt.	
Indorana	Gen. et sp. nov	Valid	Folie et al.	Early Eocene	Cambay Shale Formation	India	A possible rhacophorid. Its type species is Indorana prasadi.	
Leiopelma acricarina	Sp. nov	Valid	Worthy et al.	Early Miocene		New Zealand	A member of Leiopelmatidae.	
Leiopelma miocaenale	Sp. nov	Valid	Worthy et al.	Early Miocene		New Zealand	A member of Leiopelmatidae.	
Liaobatrachus zhaoi	Sp. nov	Valid	Dong et al.	Early Cretaceous (Barremian)	Yixian Formation	China	An anuran of uncertain phylogenetic placement, a species of Liaobatrachus.	
Paranecturus	Gen. et sp. nov	Valid	Demar	Late Cretaceous (Maastrichtian)	Hell Creek Formation	United States	A mudpuppy. The type species is Paranecturus garbanii.	
Ukrainurus	Gen. et sp. nov	Valid	Vasilyan et al.	Miocene		Ukraine	A relative of cryptobranchids. The type species is Ukrainurus hypsognathus.	
Wesserpeton	Gen. et sp. nov	Valid	Sweetman & Gardner	Barremian	Wessex Formation	England	An albanerpetontid.	

== Turtles ==
=== Research ===
- A study on the anatomy of the brain and inner ear of the Jurassic turtle Plesiochelys etalloni is published by Paulina Carabajal et al. (2013).

=== Newly named turtles ===
Name	Novelty	Status	Authors	Age	Unit	Location	Notes	Images
Adocus inexpectatus	Sp. nov	Valid	Danilov et al.	Late Eocene	Youganwo Formation	China	An adocid, a species of Adocus.	
Atoposemys	Gen. et sp. nov	Valid	Hutchison	Early Paleocene (Puercan)	Fort Union Formation	United States	A trionychid. The type species is Atoposemys entopteros.	
Bairdemys healeyorum	Sp. nov	Valid	Weems & Knight	Late Oligocene	Chandler Bridge Formation	United States	A podocnemidid pleurodiran, a species of Bairdemys.	
Basilemys gaffneyi	Sp. nov	Valid	Sullivan, Jasinski & Lucas	Late Campanian		United States	A nanhsiungchelyid turtle, a species of Basilemys.	
Brachyopsemys	Gen. et sp. nov	Valid	Tong & Meylan	Early Paleocene	Ouled Abdoun Basin	Morocco	A cryptodiran closely related to Sandownia. The type species is Brachyopsemys tingitana.	
Camerochelys	Gen. et sp. nov	Valid	Pérez-García & Murelaga	Early Cretaceous (Hauterivian or Barremian)	Cameros Basin	Spain	A member of Pan-Cryptodira (the clade containing living cryptodirans and all turtles sharing a more recent common ancestor with them than with pleurodirans), possibly a xinjiangchelyid. The type species is Camerochelys vilanovai.	
Cardichelyon	Gen. et sp. nov	Valid	Hutchison	Early Eocene (Wasatchian)		United States	A turtle of uncertain phylogenetic placement. Originally described as a platysternid, but subsequently argued to be a member of Kinosternoidea. The type species is Cardichelyon rogerwoodi.	
?Centrochelys marocana	Sp. nov	Valid	Gmira et al.	Pliocene		Morocco	A tortoise, possibly a species of Centrochelys.	
Changmachelys	Gen. et sp. nov	Valid	Brinkman et al.	Early Cretaceous	Xiagou Formation	China	A member of (likely paraphyletic) group "Macrobaenidae". The type species is Changmachelys bohlini.	
Chelodina (Chelodina) murrayi	Sp. nov	Valid	Yates	Late Miocene	Waite Formation	Australia	A chelid, a species of Chelodina.	
Chelonoidis lutzae	Sp. nov	Valid	Zacarías et al.	Late Pleistocene (58–22 ka)		Argentina	A tortoise, a species of Chelonoidis.	
Chrysemys isoni	Sp. nov	Valid	Weems & George	Miocene	Calvert Formation	United States	A relative of the painted turtle.	
Cuora chiangmuanensis	Sp. nov	Valid	Naksri et al.	Late Middle or early Late Miocene		Thailand	An Asian box turtle.	
Floridemys hurdi	Sp. nov	Valid	Weems & George	Miocene	Calvert Formation	United States	A tortoise, a species of Floridemys.	
Kappachelys	Gen. et sp. nov	Valid	Hirayama, Isaji & Hibino	Early Cretaceous	Akaiwa Formation	Japan	A turtle of uncertain phylogenetic placement. Originally considered to be a relative of trionychids; Skutschas et al. (2017) considered it to be either a pan-trionychian (sister taxon to Trionychia) or a pan-carettochelyid. The type species is Kappachelys okurai.	
Laganemys	Gen. et sp. nov	Disputed	Sereno & ElShafie	Aptian or Albian	Elrhaz Formation	Niger	An araripemydid pleurodiran. The type species is Laganemys tenerensis. Pérez-García (2019) considered this species to be a junior synonym of Taquetochelys decorata.	
Neochelys liriae	Sp. nov	Valid	Pérez-García & de Lapparent de Broin	Eocene (Ypresian)		France	A podocnemidid, a species of Neochelys.	
Neurankylus lithographicus	Sp. nov	Valid	Larson et al.	Santonian	Milk River Formation	Canada	A neurankyline baenid, a species of Neurankylus.	
Nostimochelone	Gen. et sp. nov	Valid	Georgalis et al.	Early Miocene	Zeugostasion Formation	Greece	A pleurodiran, a member of Podocnemidoidea. The type species is Nostimochelone lampra.	
Ocadia tanegashimensis	Sp. nov	Valid	Takahashi et al.	Early middle Miocene	Kawachi Formation	Japan	A geoemydid, a species of Ocadia.	
Ocepechelon	Gen. et sp. nov	Valid	Bardet et al.	Late Cretaceous (late Maastrichtian)	Oulad Abdoun Basin	Morocco	A relative of dermochelyids and protostegids. The type species is Ocepechelon bouyai.	
Paramongolemys	Gen. et sp. nov	Valid	Danilov & Sukhanov	Late Paleocene	Naranbulak Formation	Mongolia	A basal member of Testudinoidea. The type species is Paramongolemys khosatzkyi.	
Planetochelys dithyros	Sp. nov	Valid	Hutchison	Early Eocene (Wasatchian)		United States	A relative of trionychids, a species of Planetochelys.	
Psilosemys	Gen. et sp. nov	Valid	Hutchison	Early Eocene (Wasatchian)		United States	The earliest North American emydid. The type species is Psilosemys wyomingensis.	
Scabremys	Gen. et comb. nov	Valid	Sullivan, Jasinski & Lucas	Late Campanian		United States	A baenid cryptodiran, a new genus for "Baena" ornata Gilmore (1935).	
Shandongemys	Gen. et sp. nov	Valid	Li et al.	Late Cretaceous		China	A lindholmemydid testudinoid. The type species is Shandongemys dongwuica.	
Sinemys brevispinus	Sp. nov	Valid	Tong & Brinkman	Early Cretaceous	Luohandong Formation	China	A sinemydid cryptodiran, a species of Sinemys.	
Spoochelys	Gen. et sp. nov	Valid	Smith & Kear	Early or middle Albian	Griman Creek Formation	Australia	A meiolaniid-like turtle. The type species is Spoochelys ormondea.	
Testudo oughlamensis	Sp. nov	Valid	Gmira et al.	Pliocene		Morocco	A tortoise, a species of Testudo.	
Trapalcochelys	Gen. et sp. nov	Valid	Sterli, de la Fuente & Cerda	Late Cretaceous (late Campanian to early Maastrichtian)	Allen Formation	Argentina	A relative of meiolaniid. The type species is Trapalcochelys sulcata.	
Tullochelys	Gen. et sp. nov	Valid	Hutchison	Maastrichtian to early Paleocene (Puercan)	Fort Union Formation; Hell Creek Formation	United States	A chelydrid. The type species is Tullochelys montanus.	
Xenochelys floridensis	Sp. nov	Valid	Bourque	Late Oligocene (early Arikareean)		United States	A kinosternid, a species of Xenochelys.	
Xinjiangchelys radiplicatoides	Sp. nov	Valid	Brinkman et al.	Late Middle or early Late Jurassic	Shishugou Formation	China	A species of Xinjiangchelys.	
Xinjiangchelys wusu	Sp. nov	Valid	Rabi et al.	Middle Jurassic	?Qigu Formation	China	A species of Xinjiangchelys.	

== Thalattosaurs ==
Name	Novelty	Status	Authors	Age	Unit	Location	Notes	Images
Concavispina	Gen. et sp. nov	Valid	Zhao et al.	Triassic	Xiaowa Formation	China	A thalattosaurid thalattosaur. The type species is Concavispina biseridens	

== Ichthyopterygians ==
Name	Novelty	Status	Authors	Age	Unit	Location	Notes	Images
Chaohusaurus zhangjiawanensis	Sp. nov	Valid	Chen et al.	Early Triassic	Jialingjiang Formation	China	A species of Chaohusaurus.	
Gulosaurus	Gen. et sp. nov	Valid	Cuthbertson, Russell & Anderson	Early Triassic	Sulphur Mountain Formation	Canada	A grippidian. The type species is Gulosaurus helmi.	
Malawania	Gen. et sp. nov	Valid	Fischer et al.	Early Cretaceous (late Hauterivian to Barremian)		Iraq	A basal member of Thunnosauria. The type species is Malawania anachronus.	
Qianichthyosaurus xingyiensis	Sp. nov	Valid	Ji, Jiang & Motani in Yang et al.	Middle Triassic (Ladinian)	Falang Formation	China		
Thalattoarchon	Gen. et sp. nov	Valid	Fröbisch et al.	Middle Triassic		United States	A merriamosaur ichthyosaur. The type species is Thalattoarchon saurophagis	

== Lepidosauromorphs ==
=== Newly named sauropterygians ===
Name	Novelty	Status	Authors	Age	Unit	Location	Notes	Images
Cryonectes	Gen. et sp. nov	Valid	Vincent, Bardet & Mattioli	Pliensbachian		France	A pliosaurid. The type species is Cryonectes neustriacus	
Gronausaurus	Gen. et sp. nov	Disputed	Hampe	Early Cretaceous (Berriasian)		Germany	A member of Plesiosauroidea of uncertain phylogenetic placement, possibly a leptocleidid or an elasmosaurid. The type species is Gronausaurus wegneri. Sachs, Hornung & Kear (2016) considered it to be a junior synonym of Brancasaurus brancai.	
Megacephalosaurus	Gen. et sp. nov	Valid	Schumacher, Carpenter & Everhart	Late Cretaceous (middle Turonian)		United States	A pliosaurid. The type species is Megacephalosaurus eulerti.	
Palatodonta	Gen. et sp. nov	Valid	Neenan, Klein & Scheyer	Early Middle Triassic		Netherlands	A relative of placodonts. The type species is Palatodonta bleekeri.	
Pliosaurus carpenteri	Sp. nov	Valid	Benson et al.	Late Jurassic	Kimmeridge Clay Formation	United Kingdom	A pliosaurid, a species of Pliosaurus	
Pliosaurus kevani	Sp. nov	Valid	Benson et al.	Late Jurassic	Kimmeridge Clay Formation	United Kingdom	A pliosaurid, a species of Pliosaurus	
Pliosaurus westburyensis	Sp. nov	Valid	Benson et al.	Late Jurassic	Kimmeridge Clay Formation	United Kingdom	A pliosaurid, a species of Pliosaurus	
Serpianosaurus germanicus	Sp. nov	Valid	Diedrich	Middle Triassic (Anisian)		Germany	A pachypleurosaur, a species of Serpianosaurus.	

=== Newly named rhynchocephalians ===
Name	Novelty	Status	Authors	Age	Unit	Location	Notes	Images
Sphenotitan	Gen. et sp. nov	Valid	Martínez et al.	Late Triassic	Quebrada del Barro Formation	Argentina	An opisthodontian rhynchocephalian. The type species is Sphenotitan leyesi.	

=== Newly named lizards ===
Name	Novelty	Status	Authors	Age	Unit	Location	Notes	Images
Apsgnathus	Gen. et sp. nov	Valid	Nydam, Rowe & Cifelli	Late Cretaceous (late Campanian, Judithian)	Aguja Formation	United States	A member of Scincomorpha of uncertain phylogenetic placement. The type species is Apsgnathus triptodon.	
Arcanosaurus	Gen. et sp. nov	Valid	Houssaye et al.	Early Cretaceous (Barremian or Aptian)	Cameros Basin	Spain	An anguimorph lizard, possibly a varanoid. The type species is Arcanosaurus ibericus.	
Arpadosaurus sepulchralis	Sp. nov	Valid	Smith & Gauthier	Early Eocene	Wasatch Formation	United States	A member of Glyptosaurinae, a species of Arpadosaurus.	
Barbaturex	Gen. et sp. nov	Valid	Head et al.	Late middle Eocene (37.2 ± 1.3 Ma)	Pondaung Formation	Myanmar	An iguanian lizard related to the genus Uromastyx. The type species is Barbaturex morrisoni.	
Bicuspidon smikros	Sp. nov	Valid	Nydam	Late Cretaceous (Cenomanian)	Dakota Formation	United States	A member of Polyglyphanodontinae, a species of Bicuspidon.	
Blanosaurus	Gen. et sp. nov	Valid	Folie, Smith & Smith	Early Eocene		Belgium; France	An amphisbaenian. The type species is Blanosaurus primeocaenus.	
Camptognathosaurus	Gen. et sp. nov	Valid	Folie, Smith & Smith	Late Paleocene		France	Originally described as an amphisbaenian; Čerňanský & Vasilyan (2024) tentatively assigned it to the family Lacertidae. The type species is Camptognathosaurus parisiensis. Čerňanský & Vasilyan (2024) considered C. parisiensis to be a junior synonym of "Glyptosaurus" walbeckensis Kuhn (1940), but maintained Camptognathosaurus as a distinct genus, resulting in a new combination Camptognathosaurus walbeckensis.	
Catactegenys	Gen. et sp. nov	Valid	Nydam, Rowe & Cifelli	Late Cretaceous (late Campanian, Judithian)	Aguja Formation	United States	A night lizard. The type species is Catactegenys solaster.	
Cemeterius	Gen. et sp. nov	Valid	Longrich, Bhullar & Gauthier	Late Cretaceous (late Maastrichtian)	Lance Formation	United States	A platynotan lizard of uncertain phylogenetic placement. The type species is Cemeterius monstrosus.	
Cnodontosaurus	Gen. et sp. nov	Valid	Nydam	Late Cretaceous (Cenomanian)	Dakota Formation	United States	A member of Anguimorpha related to xenosaurids. The type species is Cnodontosaurus suchockii.	
Dakotasaurus	Gen. et sp. nov	Junior homonym	Nydam	Late Cretaceous (Cenomanian)	Dakota Formation	United States	A member of Scincomorpha of uncertain phylogenetic placement, assigned by Nydam (2013) to an informal paramacellodid-cordylid grade. The type species is Dakotasaurus gillettorum. The generic name turned out to be preoccupied by Dakotasaurus Branson & Mehl (1932); the lizard genus was subsequently renamed Dakotaseps.	
Desertiguana	Gen. et sp. nov	Valid	Alifanov	Late Cretaceous		Mongolia	A phrynosomatid lizard. The type species is Desertiguana gobiensis.	
Distortodon	Gen. et sp. nov	Valid	Makádi	Late Cretaceous (Santonian)		Hungary	A member of Polyglyphanodontinae. The type species is Distortodon rhomboideus.	
Entomophontes	Gen. et 2 sp. nov	Valid	Smith & Gauthier	Early Eocene	Wasatch Formation	United States	A relative of species belonging to the genus Xenosaurus. Genus contains two species: Entomophontes incrustatus and Entomophontes hutchisoni.	
Eonatator coellensis	Sp. nov	Valid	Páramo	Campanian		Colombia	A mosasaur, a new species of Eonatator.	
Glyptosaurus agmodon	Sp. nov	Valid	Smith & Gauthier	Early Eocene	Wasatch Formation	United States	A member of Glyptosaurinae, a species of Glyptosaurus.	
Heterodontagama	Gen. et sp. nov	Valid	Rana et al.	Early Eocene (early to middle Ypresian)	Cambay Shale Formation	India	A member of Priscagamidae. The type species is Heterodontagama borsukae.	
Indiagama	Gen. et sp. nov	Valid	Rana et al.	Early Eocene (early to middle Ypresian)	Cambay Shale Formation	India	A member of Agamidae. The type species is Indiagama gujarata.	
Lamiasaura	Gen. et sp. nov	Valid	Longrich, Bhullar & Gauthier	Late Cretaceous (late Maastrichtian)	Lance Formation	United States	A squamate of uncertain phylogenetic placement. The type species is Lamiasaura ferox.	
Lonchisaurus	Gen. et sp. nov	Valid	Longrich, Bhullar & Gauthier	Late Cretaceous (late Maastrichtian)	Lance Formation	United States	A scincomorph lizard of uncertain phylogenetic placement. The type species is Lonchisaurus trichurus.	
Monocnemodon	Gen. et sp. nov	Valid	Nydam	Late Cretaceous (Santonian)	Straight Cliffs Formation	United States	A member of Scincomorpha of uncertain phylogenetic placement, assigned by Nydam (2013) to an informal paramacellodid-cordylid grade. The type species is Monocnemodon syphakos.	
Obamadon	Gen. et sp. nov	Valid	Longrich, Bhullar & Gauthier	Late Cretaceous (late Maastrichtian)	Hell Creek Formation; Lance Formation	United States	A polyglyphanodontian lizard of uncertain phylogenetic placement. The type species is Obamadon gracilis.	
Odaxosaurus roosevelti	Sp. nov	Valid	Nydam	Late Cretaceous	Kaiparowits Formation	United States	A member of Anguidae, a species of Odaxosaurus.	
Palaeoxantusia amara	Sp. nov	Valid	Smith & Gauthier	Early Eocene	Wasatch Formation	United States	A night lizard, a species of Palaeoxantusia.	
Palepidophyma	Gen. et 2 sp. nov	Valid	Smith & Gauthier	Early Eocene	Wasatch Formation	United States	A night lizard. Genus contains two species: Palepidophyma paradisa and Palepidophyma lilliputiana.	
Parasaniwa cynochoros	Sp. nov	Valid	Nydam	Late Cretaceous	Kaiparowits Formation	United States	A member of Platynota of uncertain phylogenetic placement, a species of Parasaniwa.	
Pariguana	Gen. et sp. nov	Valid	Longrich, Bhullar & Gauthier	Late Cretaceous (late Maastrichtian)	Lance Formation	United States	An iguanid lizard of uncertain phylogenetic placement. The type species is Pariguana lancensis.	
Pelsochamops	Gen. et sp. nov	Valid	Makádi	Late Cretaceous (Santonian)	Csehbánya Formation	Hungary	A chamopsiid. The type species is Pelsochamops infrequens.	
Plesiolacerta eratosthenesi	Sp. nov	Valid	Čerňanský & Augé	Late Oligocene		Germany	A lacertid lizard, a species of Plesiolacerta.	
Polyodontobaena	Gen. et sp. nov	Valid	Folie, Smith & Smith	Early Paleocene	Hainin Formation	Belgium	An amphisbaenian. The type species is Polyodontobaena belgica.	
Provaranosaurus fatuus	Sp. nov	Valid	Smith & Gauthier	Early Eocene	Wasatch Formation	United States	A relative of the Chinese crocodile lizard, a species of Provaranosaurus.	
Romeosaurus	Gen. et 2 sp. nov	Valid	Palci, Caldwell & Papazzoni	Late Cretaceous (early Turonian to early Santonian)		Italy	A mosasaur related to Russellosaurus and Yaguarasaurus. Genus contains two species: Romeosaurus fumanensis and Romeosaurus sorbinii.	
Schillerosaurus	Nom. nov	Valid	Nydam, Chure & Evans	Late Jurassic	Morrison Formation	United States	A replacement name for Schilleria Evans & Chure (1999).	
Scincoideus grassator	Sp. nov	Valid	Smith & Gauthier	Early Eocene	Wasatch Formation	United States	A member of Lacertiformes, a species of Scincoideus.	
Socognathus brachyodon	Sp. nov	Valid	Longrich, Bhullar & Gauthier	Late Cretaceous (late Maastrichtian)	Lance Formation	United States	A chamopsiid polyglyphanodontian lizard, a species of Socognathus.	
Suratagama	Gen. et sp. nov	Valid	Rana et al.	Early Eocene (early to middle Ypresian)	Cambay Shale Formation	India	A member of Agamidae. The type species is Suratagama neeraae.	
Suzanniwana revenanta	Sp. nov	Valid	Smith & Gauthier	Early Eocene	Wasatch Formation	United States	A member of Pleurodonta, a species of Suzanniwana.	
Tiliqua laticephala	Sp. nov	Disputed	Čerňanský & Hutchinson	Pliocene		Australia	A blue-tongued skink. Possibly a junior synonym of Tiliqua frangens.	
Utahgenys antongai	Sp. nov	Valid	Nydam	Late Cretaceous (Cenomanian)	Dakota Formation	United States	A contogeniid scincomorph, a species of Utahgenys.	
Webbsaurus	Gen. et sp. nov	Valid	Nydam	Late Cretaceous (Cenomanian)	Dakota Formation	United States	A scincomorph related to skinks. The type species is Webbsaurus lofgreni.	
Xestops savagei	Sp. nov	Valid	Smith & Gauthier	Early Eocene	Wasatch Formation	United States	A member of Glyptosaurinae, a species of Xestops.	

=== Newly named snakes ===
Name	Novelty	Status	Authors	Age	Unit	Location	Notes	Images
Cerberophis	Gen. et sp. nov	Valid	Longrich, Bhullar & Gauthier	Late Cretaceous (late Maastrichtian)	Hell Creek Formation	United States	An alethinophidian snake of uncertain phylogenetic placement. The type species is Cerberophis robustus.	
Kataria	Gen. et sp. nov	Junior homonym	Scanferla et al.	Early Paleocene (Danian)	Santa Lucía Formation	Bolivia	A macrostomatan snake related to caenophidians. The type species is Kataria anisodonta. The generic name is preoccupied by Kataria Faubel (1983); Deshmukh et al. (2022) coined a replacement name Katariana.	
Nidophis	Gen. et sp. nov	Valid	Vasile, Csiki-Sava & Venczel	Late Cretaceous (Maastrichtian)	Haţeg Basin	Romania	A madtsoiid. The type species is Nidophis insularis.	

== Archosauromorphs ==
=== Newly named basal archosauromorphs ===
Name	Novelty	Status	Authors	Age	Unit	Location	Notes	Images
Ankylosuchus	Gen. et sp. nov	Valid	Lucas, Spielmann & Hunt	Late Triassic	Colorado City Formation	United States	A doswelliid. The type species is Ankylosuchus chinlegroupensis.	
Asperoris	Gen. et sp. nov	Valid	Nesbitt, Butler & Gower	Middle Triassic (probably late Anisian)	Manda beds	Tanzania	A non-archosaurian archosauriform of uncertain phylogenetic placement. The type species is Asperoris mnyama.	
Fuyuansaurus	Gen. et sp. nov	Valid	Fraser, Rieppel & Chun	Middle Triassic (Ladinian)	Falang Formation	China	A protorosaur. The type species is Fuyuansaurus acutirostris.	
Jaxtasuchus	Gen. et sp. nov	Valid	Schoch & Sues	Middle Triassic (Ladinian)	Erfurt Formation	Germany	A doswelliid. The type species is Jaxtasuchus salomoni.	
Machaeroprosopus lottorum	Sp. nov	Valid	Hungerbühler et al.	Late Triassic	Cooper Canyon Formation	United States	A phytosaur, a species of Machaeroprosopus.	
Macrocnemus obristi	Sp. nov	Valid	Fraser & Furrer	Middle Triassic (Ladinian)	Prosanto Formation	Switzerland	A protorosaur, a species of Macrocnemus.	
Wannia	Gen. et comb. nov	Valid	Stocker	Late Triassic		United States	A phytosaur; a new genus for "Paleorhinus" scurriensis Langston (1949).	

== Other reptiles ==
Name	Novelty	Status	Authors	Age	Unit	Location	Notes	Images
Dolerosaurus	Gen. et comb. nov	Valid	Butler	Late Triassic (late Carnian)	Lunz Formation	Austria	A diapsid of uncertain phylogenetic placement, a new genus for "Francosuchus" trauthi Huene (1939).	
Ruhuhuaria	Gen. et sp. nov	Valid	Tsuji, Sobral & Müller	Middle Triassic	Manda Formation	Tanzania	A procolophonoid parareptile, possibly an owenettid. The type species is Ruhuhuaria reiszi.	

== Synapsids ==
=== Non-mammalian synapsids ===
==== Research ====
- The postcranial skeleton of therocephalian Ictidosuchoides is described by Heidi Fourie (2013).

==== New taxa ====
Name	Novelty	Status	Authors	Age	Unit	Location	Notes	Images
Diegocanis	Gen. et sp. nov	Valid	Martínez, Fernandez & Alcober	Late Triassic	Ischigualasto Formation	Argentina	A member of Eucynodontia closely related to Ecteninion and Trucidocynodon. The type species is Diegocanis elegans.	
Mandagomphodon	Gen. et comb. nov	Valid	Hopson	Middle Triassic	Manda Formation	Tanzania	A traversodontid cynodont, a new genus for "Scalenodon" hirschsoni Crompton (1972).	
Niassodon	Gen. et sp. nov	Valid	Castanhinha et al.	Late Permian		Mozambique	A kingoriid emydopoid dicynodont. The type species is Niassodon mfumukasi.	
Tambacarnifex	Gen. et sp. nov	Valid	Berman et al.	Early Permian	Tambach Formation	Germany	A varanodontine varanopid. The type species is Tambacarnifex unguifalcatus.	

== Other animals ==
Name	Novelty	Status	Authors	Age	Unit	Location	Notes	Images
Alaconcha	Gen. et sp. nov	Valid	Devaere, Clausen & Steiner in Devaere et al.	Cambrian (Tommotian)	Heraultia Limestone	France	An animal of uncertain phylogenetic placement, a low cap-shaped bilaterally symmetrical conch. The type species is A. rugosa.	
Anomalocaris kunmingensis	Sp. nov	Valid	Wang, Huang & Hu	Cambrian	Wulongqing Formation	China	A radiodont. Originally described as a species of Anomalocaris, but subsequently transferred to the amplectobeluid genus Guanshancaris.	
Cambrocornulitus	Gen. et sp. nov	Valid	Yang et al.	Early Cambrian	Qiongzhusi Formation	China	An animal of uncertain phylogenetic placement, possibly a member of Cornulitida. The type species is Cambrocornulitus rarus.	
Cephalodiscus? nusplingensis	Sp. nov	Valid	Schweigert & Dietl	Late Jurassic	Nusplingen Limestone	Germany	Possibly a pterobranch belonging to the genus Cephalodiscus.	
Chengjiangocaris kunmingensis	Sp. nov	Valid	Yang et al.	Cambrian Stage 3	Hongjingshao Formation	China	A stem-arthropod.	
Conularia porcella	Sp. nov	Valid	Robson & Young	Late Ordovician (middle Katian)	Red River Formation	Canada	A conulariid, a species of Conularia.	
Fuxianhuia xiaoshibaensis	Sp. nov	Valid	Yang et al.	Cambrian Stage 3	Hongjingshao Formation	China	A stem-arthropod.	
Gracilitheca astronauta	Sp. nov	Valid	Valent & Fatka	Cambrian	Buchava Formation	Czech Republic	A member of Hyolitha (a group of animals of uncertain phylogenetic placement, possibly molluscs), a species of Gracilitheca.	
Gracilitheca mirabilis	Sp. nov	Valid	Valent, Fatka & Marek	Cambrian	Buchava Formation	Czech Republic	A member of Hyolitha (a group of animals of uncertain phylogenetic placement, possibly molluscs), a species of Gracilitheca.	
Gracilitheca triangularis	Sp. nov	Valid	Valent, Fatka & Marek	Cambrian	Buchava Formation	Czech Republic	A member of Hyolitha, a species of Gracilitheca.	
Hunanoscolex	Gen. et sp. nov	Valid	Duan & Dong	Cambrian (Paibian)	Bitiao Formation	China	A palaeoscolecid. The type species is H. campus.	
Microconchus hintonensis	Sp. nov	Valid	Zatoń & Peck	Carboniferous (late Mississippian)	Bluestone Formation; Hinton Formation	United States	A member of Microconchida (a group of animals of uncertain phylogenetic placement, possibly molluscs).	
Microconchus utahensis	Sp. nov	Valid	Zatoń, Taylor & Vinn	Early Triassic	Virgin Formation	United States	A member of Microconchida (a group of animals of uncertain phylogenetic placement, possibly molluscs), a species of Microconchus.	
Muensterina	Gen. et comb. nov	Valid	Bizzarini	Late Triassic (Carnian)	Heiligkreuz Formation; San Cassiano Formation	Italy	A demosponge belonging to the group Agelasida and to the family Sestrostomellidae. The type species is "Cnemidium" variabile Münster (1841).	
Nephrotheca betula	Sp. nov	Valid	Valent, Fatka & Marek	Cambrian	Buchava Formation	Czech Republic	A member of Hyolitha, a species of Nephrotheca.	
Nephrotheca sophia	Sp. nov	Valid	Valent & Fatka	Cambrian	Buchava Formation	Czech Republic	A member of Hyolitha, a species of Nephrotheca.	
Oktavites kemanensis	Sp. nov	Valid	Zhang et al.	Silurian (Telychian)	Manbo Formation	China	A graptolite.	
Ornatoscolex	Gen. et sp. nov	Valid	Duan & Dong	Cambrian (Paibian)	Bitiao Formation	China	A palaeoscolecid. The type species is O. hunanensis.	
Paraconularia bachmanni	Sp. nov	Valid	Barth et al.	Late Triassic		Germany	A conulariid, a species of Paraconularia.	
Paranomalocaris	Gen. et sp. nov	Valid	Wang, Huang & Hu	Cambrian	Wulongqing Formation	China	A member of Anomalocarididae (a group of animals with uncertain phylogenetic placement, possibly stem-arthropods). The type species is Paranomalocaris multisegmentalis.	
Potamophloios canadensis	Sp. nov	Valid	Pisera, Siver & Wolfe	Eocene (Lutetian)		Canada	A sponge belonging to the family Potamolepidae.	
Quasiaulacera	Gen. et 2 sp. nov	Valid	Copper, Stock & Jin	Late Ordovician (Hirnantian)	Ellis Bay Formation	Canada	A stromatoporoid. Genus contains two species: Quasiaulacera stellata and Q. occidua.	
Spinitheca	Gen. et sp. nov	Valid	Novozhilova	Early Cambrian (Atdabanian)		Russia	A member of Hyolitha (a group of animals of uncertain phylogenetic placement, possibly molluscs). The type species is Spinitheca sysoievi.	
Wronascolex iacoborum	Sp. nov	Valid	García-Bellido, Paterson & Edgecombe	Cambrian Stage 4	Emu Bay Shale	Australia	A palaeoscolecid.	
Valandria	Gen. et sp. nov	Valid	Bizzarini	Late Triassic (Carnian)	Heiligkreuz Formation	Italy	A demosponge belonging to the group Agelasida and to the family Sestrostomellidae. The type species is V. bertii.	
Wildspongia	Gen. et sp. nov	Valid	Bizzarini	Late Triassic (Carnian)	Heiligkreuz Formation	Italy	A demosponge belonging to the group Agelasida and to the family Sestrostomellidae. The type species is W. stollae.	

== Other organisms ==
Name	Novelty	Status	Authors	Age	Unit	Location	Notes	Images
Gorgonisphaeridium savertonense	Sp. nov.	Valid	Wicander & Playford	Devonian (Famennian)	Saverton Shale	United States	An acritarch.	
Honeggeriella	Gen. et sp. nov	Valid	Matsunaga, Stockey & Tomescu	Early Cretaceous (Valanginian-Hauterivian boundary)	Longarm Formation	Canada	A heteromerous lichen. The type species is Honeggeriella complexa.	
Plumalina brevis	Sp. nov	Valid	Muscente & Allmon	Devonian (Frasnian)	Ithaca Formation	United States	An organism of uncertain phylogenetic placement, argued by different authors to be a hydrozoan or a Caulerpa-like alga.	
Plumalina tenera	Sp. nov	Valid	Muscente & Allmon	Silurian (Wenlock)	Rochester Shale	United States	An organism of uncertain phylogenetic placement, argued by different authors to be a hydrozoan or a Caulerpa-like alga.	
