= William M. Furnish =

American paleontologist

William Madison Furnish (August 17, 1912, in Tipton, Iowa – November 9, 2007) was an American paleontologist. He taught at the University of Iowa.

In 1938, he described the conodont genus Acanthodus from the Prairie du Chien (Lower Ordovician) beds of the upper Mississippi valley.

In 1964, with Carl B. Rexroad, he described the conodont genus Hindeodus from the Pella Formation (Mississippian) of South-Central Iowa.

== Awards and tributes ==
He received the Pander Medal, awarded by the Pander Society, an informal organisation founded in 1967 for the promotion of the study of conodont palaeontology.

The conodont genus name Furnishina Müller 1959 is a tribute to WM Furnish.
