= Patcham Formation =

Geologic formation in India

- Stratigraphic range: Bathonian; ~167–165 Ma
- Type: Geological formation

Lithology
- Primary: Limestone
- Other: Marl

Location
- Coordinates: 23.5°N 70.5°E
- Approximate paleocoordinates: 23.4°S 33.3°E
- Region: Gujarat, Kachchh
- Country: India
- Extent: Patcham Island

Type section
- Named for: Patcham Island
- Patcham Formation (India)

The Patcham Formation or Pachchham Formation is a Bathonian geologic formation of Patcham Island, Kutch district, Gujarat, India. Dinosaur remains are among the fossils that have been recovered from the formation, although none have yet been referred to a specific genus.

== Fossil content ==
| Color key: Taxon / Reclassified taxon / Taxon falsely reported as present / Dubious taxon or junior synonym / Ichnotaxon / Ootaxon / Morphotaxon | Notes; Uncertain or tentative taxa are in small text; ~~crossed out~~ taxa are discredited. |

=== Fish ===
==== Cartilaginous Fish ====
Cartilaginous Fish of the Patcham Formation
| Genus | Species | Location | Stratigraphic position | Material | Notes | Image |
|---|---|---|---|---|---|---|
| Strophodus | S. atlasensis | Kachchh | Bathonian | Teeth | A durophagous acrodontid hybodont | |

=== Echinoderms ===
Echinoderms of the Patcham Formation
| Genus | Species | Location | Stratigraphic position | Material | Notes | Image |
|---|---|---|---|---|---|---|
| Krohcoma | K. ampla | Kachchh | Bathonian | | A ophiacanthid brittle star | |
| Ophiolimna | O. malagasica | Kachchh | Bathonian | | A ophiacanthid brittle star | |

== See also ==
- List of dinosaur-bearing rock formations
  - List of stratigraphic units with indeterminate dinosaur fossils
