= Ostrovskia =

Scientific classification
- Kingdom: Animalia
- Phylum: Bryozoa
- Class: Gymnolaemata
- Order: Cheilostomatida
- Genus: †Ostrovskia; Zágoršek & Gordon, 2012

Extinct genus of moss animals

Ostrovskia is an extinct genus of bryozoans which existed in what is now Turkey during the late Tortonian. It was described by Kamil Zágoršek and Dennis P. Gordon in 2012 and the type species is O. triforamina.

== Etymology ==
The genus was named in honour of Andrei N. Ostrovsky, for his studies on the reproductive structures of cheilostomes. The species epithet refers to three apices on the heterozooecium located directly against the proximal wall of the mouth.
