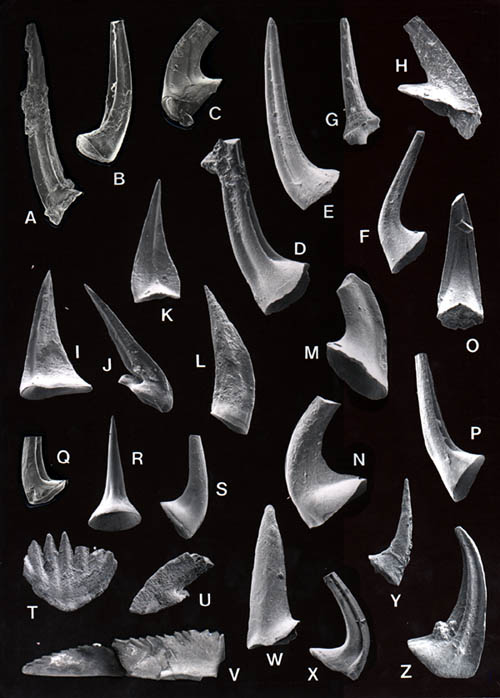
- W: Acanthodus uncinatus Furnish; lateral view of non-serrate suberectiform element, from upper part of middle Gasconade Dolomites at Phillips Quarry, X 50, USNM 498518.

Scientific classification
- Kingdom: Animalia
- Phylum: Chordata
- Infraphylum: Agnatha
- Class: †Conodonta
- Order: †Protopanderodontida
- Family: †Acanthodontidae
- Genus: †Acanthodus; Furnish, 1938

Species
- †Acanthodus costatus; †Acanthodus humachensis; †Acanthodus raqueli; †Acanthodus uncinatus

= Acanthodus =

Acanthodus Temporal range: Late Cambrian–Early Ordovician

Extinct genus of jawless fishes

Acanthodus is an extinct genus of conodonts.

Acanthodus humachensis and A. raqueli are from then Late Cambrian (late Furongian) or early Ordovician (Tremadocian) of the Santa Rosita Formation in Argentina.
