= Poricellaria =

Scientific classification
- Kingdom: Animalia
- Phylum: Bryozoa
- Class: Gymnolaemata
- Order: Cheilostomatida
- Suborder: Flustrina
- Superfamily: Microporoidea
- Family: Poricellariidae; Harmer, 1926
- Genus: Poricellaria d'Orbigny, 1854

Synonyms
- Diplodidymia Reuss, 1869

Family of bryozoans

Poricellaria is a of genus of bryozoans belonging to the order Cheilostomatida. It is the only genus in the monotypic family Poricellariidae.

== Species ==
There is only one extant species in the genus Poricellaria. The following species are recognised:

- †Poricellaria alata d'Orbigny, 1854
- †Poricellaria complicata (Reuss, 1869)
- †Poricellaria daniensis Voigt, 1999
- †Poricellaria diplodidymioides (Meunier & Pergens, 1886)
- †Poricellaria karinae Martha, Sanner, Cheetham & Scholz, 2025
- †Poricellaria limanowskii (Canu, 1907)
- Poricellaria ratoniensis (Waters, 1887)
- †Poricellaria sakurkari Sonar & Gaikwad, 2013
- †Poricellaria vernoni Cheetham, 1963
- †Poricellaria waioriensis Sonar & Gaikwad, 2013
