= Blake Nose =

Submerged peninsula in the Atlantic Ocean

Coordinates: 30°N 76.5°W

Blake Nose is a submerged peninsula extending northeast from the North American continental shelf, located about 280 miles (460 km) east of Daytona Beach, Florida.

A salient of the Blake Plateau, Blake Nose is a "gentle ramp" of the continental shelf, which was built up during the Eocene, and consists of "carbonate ooze and chalk." That layer is on top of an older Albian sequence of green claystone and shale, and below that is the K-T boundary. The discovery of the K-T boundary here is direct evidence of the "mass wasting" of the Cretaceous–Paleogene extinction event caused by the Chicxulub impact event. Together with other, complementary evidence collected by the Geological Society of America, the phenomena at Blake Nose show that the Mesozoic or 'age of dinosaurs' ended with a sudden, catastrophic extinction event caused by an extraterrestrial object.

It is about 40 mi (64 km) wide at the base of the peninsula and about 50 mi (80 km) long.

Blake Nose appears as a distinctive "spur" in online satellite maps which show the Atlantic continental shelf of Florida.
