= Indorana =

Indorana Temporal range: Ypresian

Scientific classification
- Domain: Eukaryota
- Kingdom: Animalia
- Phylum: Chordata
- Class: Amphibia
- Order: Anura
- Family: Rhacophoridae
- Genus: †Indorana; Folie & Rana et al., 2012

Type species
- †Indorana prasadi Folie & Rana et al., 2012

Extinct genus of amphibians

Indorana is an extinct genus of lissamphibians which existed in what is now India during the Early Eocene. The type and only known species is Indorana prasadi.

The genus name comes from Latin Indo- ("India") and rana ("frog), while the species is named in honor of the Indian paleontologist Guntupalli V.R. Prasad.
