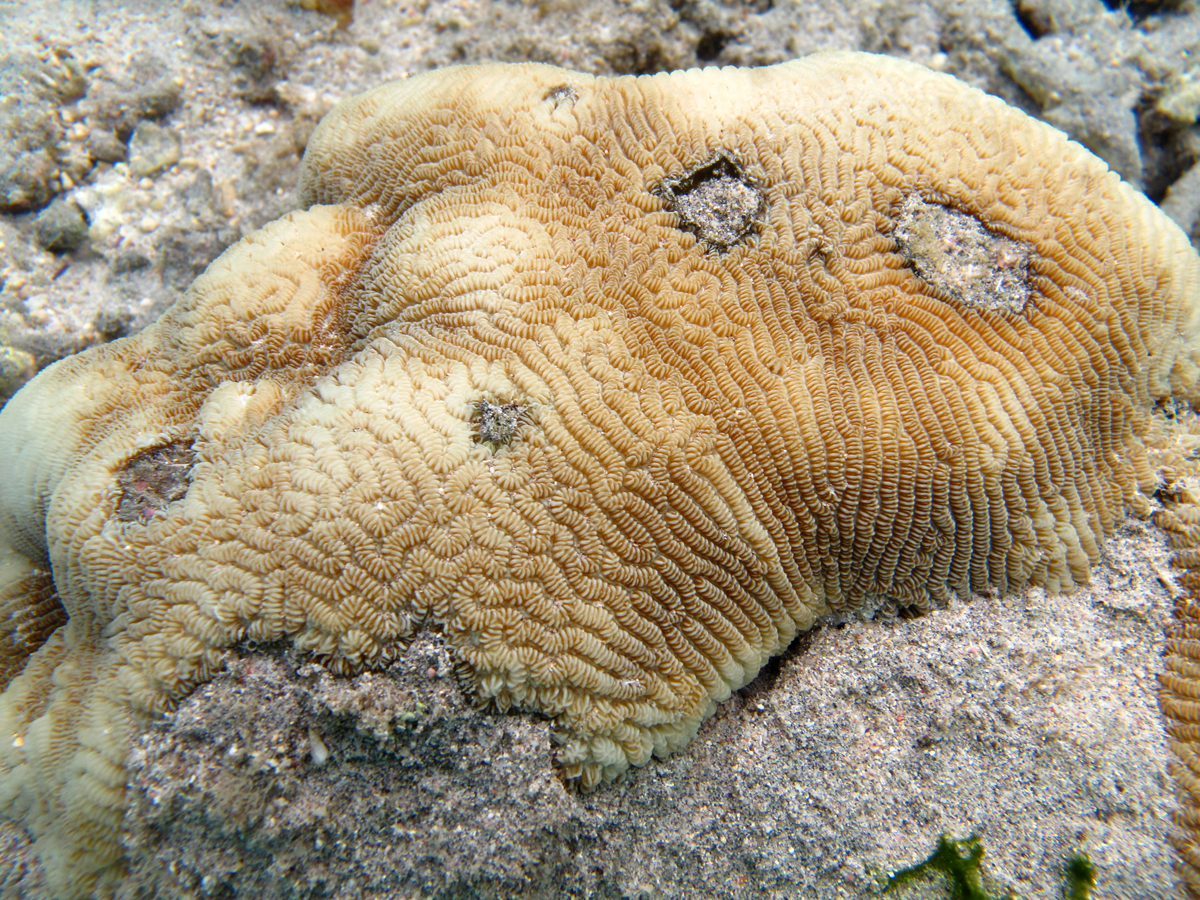
- Leptoria phrygia

Scientific classification
- Kingdom: Animalia
- Phylum: Cnidaria
- Subphylum: Anthozoa
- Class: Hexacorallia
- Order: Scleractinia
- Family: Merulinidae
- Genus: Leptoria; Milne Edwards & Haime, 1848

Species
- See text

= Leptoria =

Genus of corals

Leptoria is a genus of stony corals in the family Merulinidae. Members of this genus are known as brain corals or closed brain corals. They are native to the Indo-Pacific region and their ranges extend from the Red Sea through the Indian Ocean as far as Japan and the South Central Pacific Ocean.

== Characteristics ==
Colonies are massive and the corallites are meandroid (in meandering valleys on the surface of the coral). The septa are neatly arranged like rungs on a ladder.

== Species ==
The following species are currently recognized by the World Register of Marine Species :

- Leptoria irregularis Veron, 1990
- Leptoria phrygia (Ellis & Solander, 1786)
