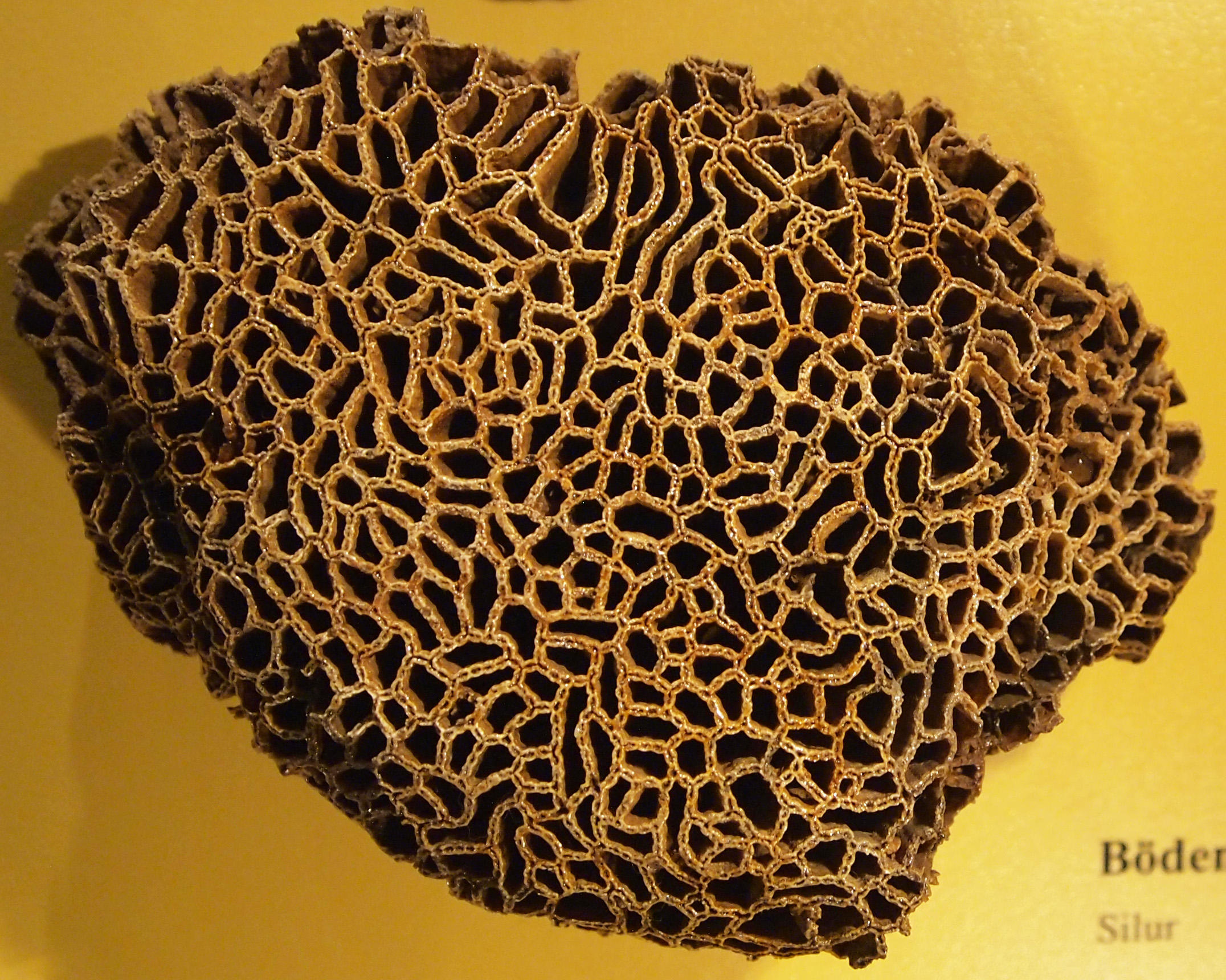
- Catenipora sp. in Museum Mensch und Natur, Munich, Germany.

Scientific classification
- Kingdom: Animalia
- Phylum: Cnidaria
- Subphylum: Anthozoa
- Class: †Tabulata
- Family: †Halysitidae
- Genus: †Catenipora; Lamarck, 1816

Species
- Several, including: †Catenipora capilliformis Volkova et al., 1978; †Catenipora crassaeformis Hubmann, 1992; †Catenipora elegans (Fischer-Benzon, 1871); †Catenipora robusta (Wilson, 1926); †Catenipora workmanae Flower, 1961; and see text

= Catenipora =

Catenipora Temporal range: 488.3–419.2 Ma

Extinct genus of corals

Catenipora is an extinct genus of tabulate corals in the family Halysitidae, known from the Ordovician to the Silurian.

C. elegans is known from the Silurian of Estonia.

== Species ==
- †Catenipora approximata
- †Catenipora arctica
- †Catenipora capilliformis
- †Catenipora copulata
- †Catenipora crassaeformis
- †Catenipora distans
- †Catenipora elegans
- †Catenipora escharoides
- †Catenipora exilis
- †Catenipora gotlandica
- †Catenipora jingyangensis
- †Catenipora maxima
- †Catenipora obliqua
- †Catenipora panga
- †Catenipora robusta
- †Catenipora rubraeformis
- †Catenipora septosa
- †Catenipora tapaensis
- †Catenipora tiewadianensis
- †Catenipora tongchuanensis
- †Catenipora tractabilis
- †Catenipora vespertina
- †Catenipora workmanae
- †Catenipora wrighti
