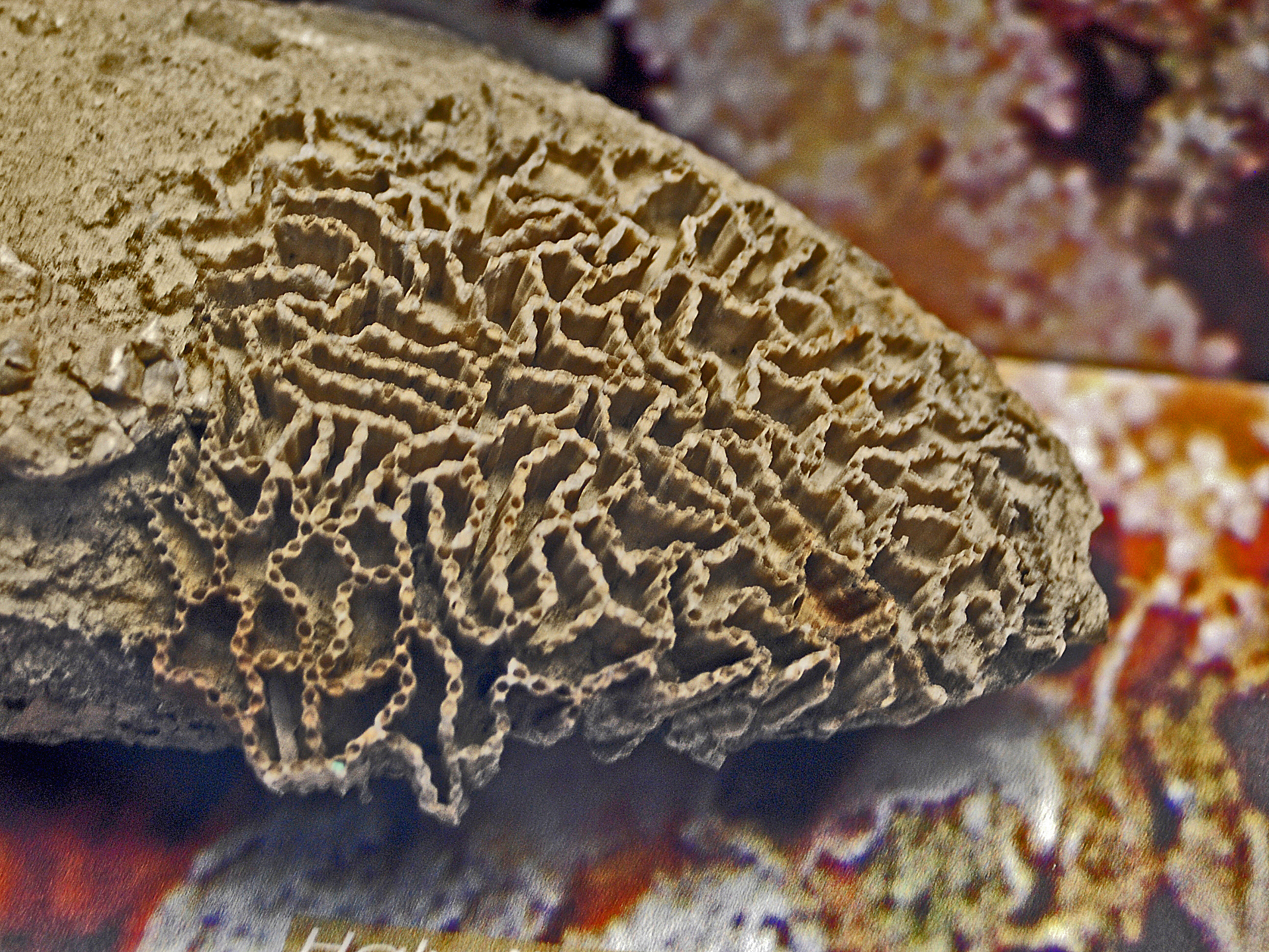
- Halysites catenularia

Scientific classification
- Kingdom: Animalia
- Phylum: Cnidaria
- Subphylum: Anthozoa
- Class: †Tabulata
- Family: †Halysitidae; Milne-Edwards and Haime, 1849

= Halysitidae =

Halysitidae Temporal range: Ordovician to Silurian

Extinct family of corals

Halysitidae is an extinct family of tabulate corals.

These tabulate corals lived from Ordovician to Devonian (from 471.8 to 412.3 Ma). Fossil corals of the family Halysitidae have been found in the sediments of Afghanistan, Canada, United States, Venezuela and Australia.

== Genera ==
- Acanthohalysites Hamada, 1957
- Catenipora Lamarck, 1816
- Cystihalysites Chernyshev, 1941
- Eocatenipora Hamada, 1957
- Falsicatenipora Hamada, 1958
- Halysites von Waldheim, 1828
- Hexismia Sokolov, 1955
- Quepora Sinclair, 1955
- Schedohalysites Hamada, 1957
- Solenihalysites Stasinska, 1967
- Spumaeolites Zhizhina, 1967
