= Utahconus =

Utahconus Temporal range: Furongian–Tremadocian

Scientific classification
- Kingdom: Animalia
- Phylum: Chordata
- Infraphylum: Agnatha
- Class: †Conodonta
- Genus: †Utahconus; Miller 1980

Type species
- †Paltodus utahensis Miller, 1969

Species
- †Utahconus longipinnatus Ji & Barnes, 1994; †Utahconus oneotensis (Furnish, 1938); †Utahconus purmamarcensis Zeballo & Albanesi, 2013; †Utahconus scandodiformis Zeballo & Albanesi, 2013; †Utahconus tarutaoensis; †Utahconus tenuis Miller, 1980; †Utahconus tortibasis Zeballo & Albanesi, 2013; †Utahconus utahensis (Miller, 1969)

Extinct genus of jawless fishes

Utahconus is an extinct genus of conodonts.

Utahconus purmamarcensis, U. scandodiformis and U. tortibasis are from the Late Cambrian (late Furongian) or early Ordovician (Tremadocian) of the Santa Rosita Formation in the Tilcara Range, Cordillera Oriental of Jujuy in Argentina.

According to J. John Sepkoski, Jr., it is in the order Conodontophoria in the class Conodonta.
