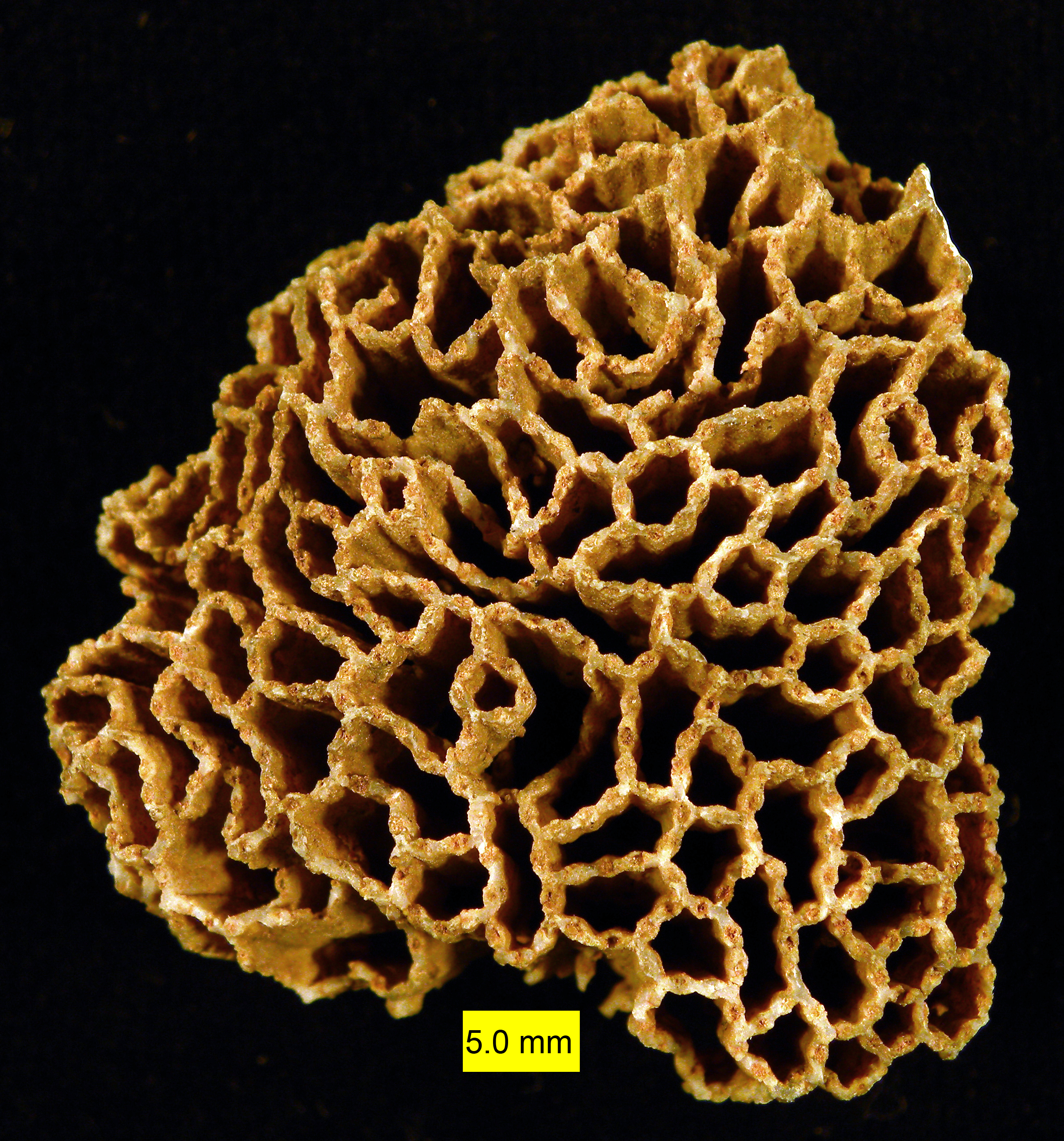
- Halysites sp. from the Silurian of Ohio; view of colony surface.

Scientific classification
- Domain: Eukaryota
- Kingdom: Animalia
- Phylum: Cnidaria
- Subphylum: Anthozoa
- Class: †Tabulata
- Family: †Halysitidae
- Genus: †Halysites von Waldheim 1813

Species
- See Species

= Halysites =

Halysites Temporal range: Late Ordovician - Early Devonian

Extinct genus of corals

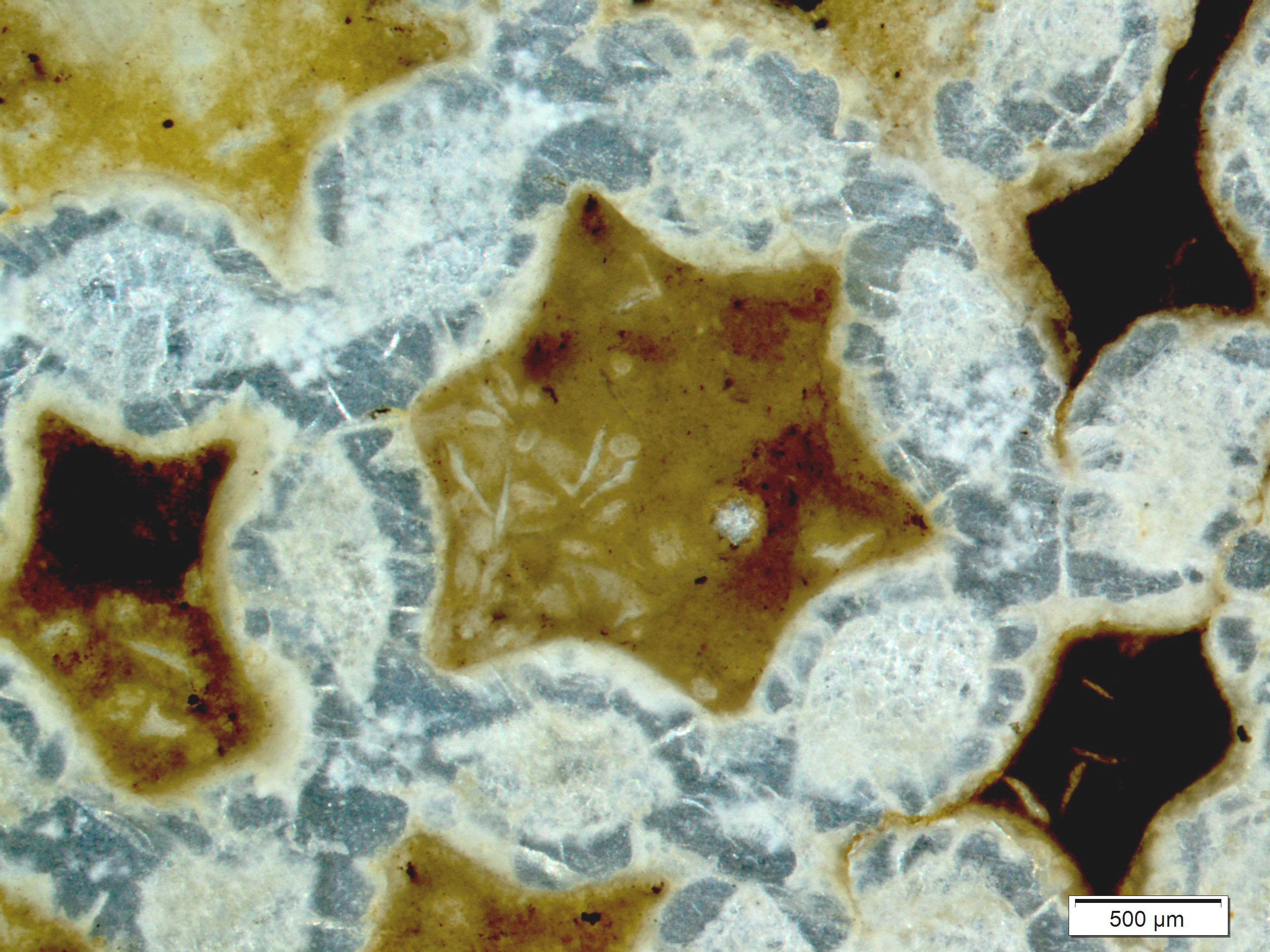
Thin-section view of Halysites corallum

Halysites (meaning chain coral) is an extinct genus of tabulate coral. Colonies range from less than one to tens of centimeters in diameter, and they fed upon plankton.

These tabulate corals lived from the Ordovician to the Devonian (from 449.5 to 412.3 Ma). Fossils of Halysites species have been found in the sediments of North America, Europe, Asia and Australia.

== Species ==
Species in the genus Halysites include:

- Halysites catenularia Linnaeus, 1767
- Halysites encrustans Buehler
- Halysites grandis Sharkova, 1981
- Halysites infundibuliformis Buehler
- Halysites junior Klaamann, 1961
- Halysites louisvillensis Stumm
- Halysites meandrina Troost
- Halysites magnitubus Buehler
- Halysites priscus Klaamann, 1966
- Halysites regularis Fischer-Benzon, 1871
- Halysites senior Klaamann, 1961
