= Treskelodden Formation =

Geologic formation in Svalbard, Norway

- Stratigraphic range: Gzhelian–Artinskian
- Type: Formation

Lithology
- Primary: Conglomerate, sandstone
- Other: Limestone

Location
- Region: Spitsbergen, Svalbard
- Country: Norway

The Treskelodden Beds is a geologic formation exposed near Hornsund on the island of Spitsbergen, Svalbard in Norway. It preserves fossils dating back from the Gzhelian stage of the Carboniferous period to the Artinskian stage of the Permian period.

== See also ==
- List of fossiliferous stratigraphic units in Norway
