= Basyaylella =

Scientific classification
- Kingdom: Animalia
- Phylum: Bryozoa
- Class: Gymnolaemata
- Order: Cheilostomatida
- Genus: †Basyaylella; Zágoršek & Gordon, 2012

Extinct genus of moss animals

Basyaylella is an extinct genus of bryozoans which existed in what is now Turkey during the late Tortonian stage of the Miocene. It was described by Kamil Zágoršek and Dennis P. Gordon in 2012, and the type species is B. elsae. The generic name refers to Başyayla, the area in which the material for the bryozoan was collected, and the species epithet is named after Elsa Gliozzi, who collected the material.
