= Ophiolimna =

Ophiolimna Temporal range: 114–0 Ma Early Cretaceous to Present
- Ophiolimna antarctica

Scientific classification
- Kingdom: Animalia
- Phylum: Echinodermata
- Class: Ophiuroidea
- Order: Ophiacanthida
- Family: Ophiacanthidae
- Genus: Ophiolimna; Verrill, 1899

Type species
- Ophiolimna bairdi Lyman, 1883

Species
- 11, see text

Synonyms
- Ophiocantha; Toporkovia Djakonov, 1954

Genus of brittle stars

Ophiolimna is a genus of brittle stars. Fossils from this genus have been found dating to the Early Cretaceous (Late Aptian).
