= 2014 in paleontology =

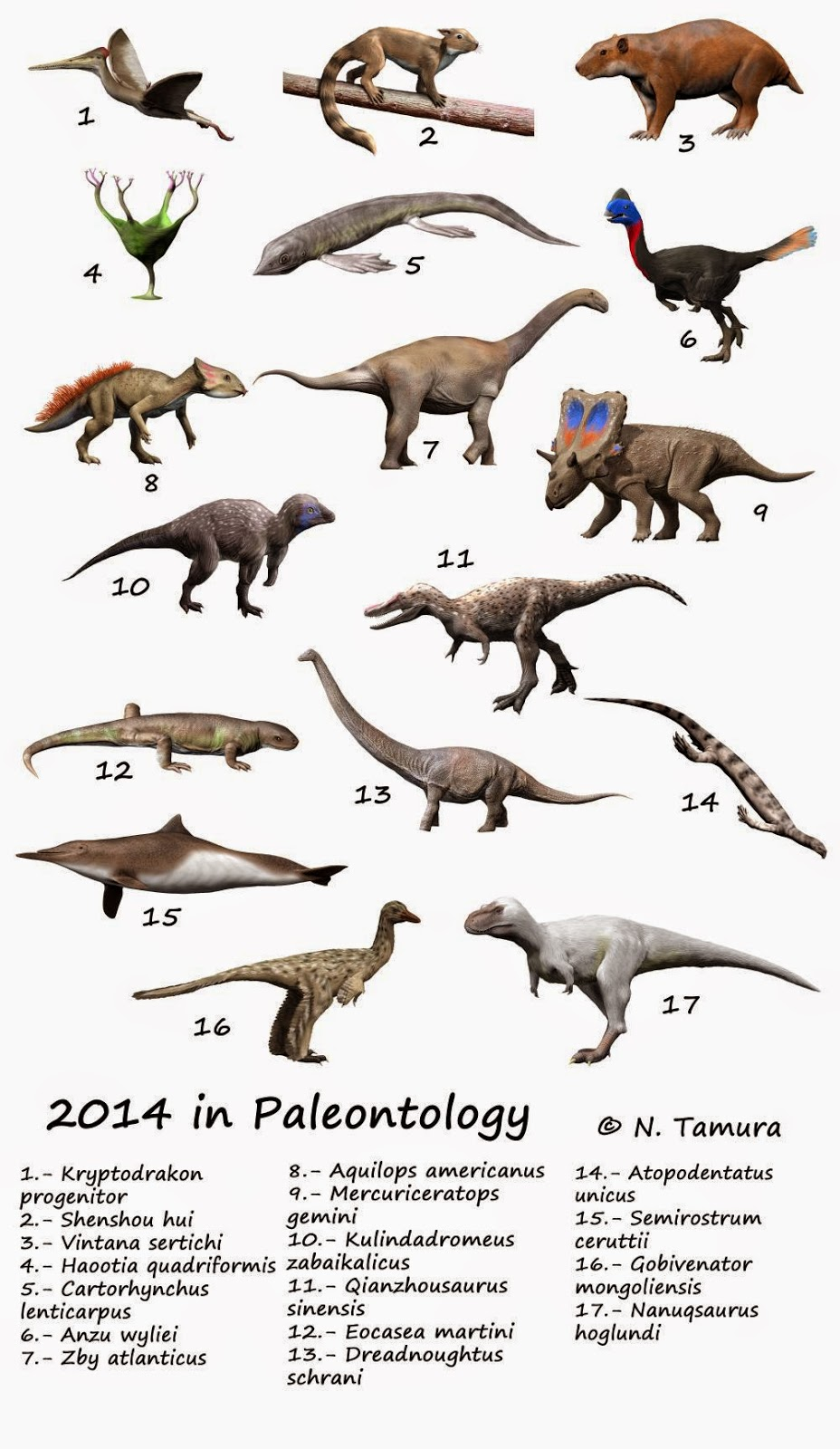
Species described in 2014

Paleontology or palaeontology is the study of prehistoric life forms on Earth through the examination of plant and animal fossils. This includes the study of body fossils, tracks (ichnites), burrows, cast-off parts, fossilised feces (coprolites), palynomorphs and chemical residues. Because humans have encountered fossils for millennia, paleontology has a long history both before and after becoming formalized as a science. This article records significant discoveries and events related to paleontology that occurred or were published in the year 2014.

== Cnidarians ==
=== Newly described cnidarians ===
Name	Novelty	Status	Authors	Age	Unit	Location	Notes	Images
Acanthophyllia indica	Sp nov	Valid	Jain	Neogene		India	A stony coral.	
Acanthophyllia patellata	Sp nov	Valid	Jain	Neogene		India	A stony coral.	
Acropora macrocalyx	Sp. nov	Valid	Wallace & Bosellini	Early Miocene (Burdigalian)		Italy	A stony coral, a species of Acropora.	
Acropora piedmontensis	Sp. nov	Valid	Wallace & Bosellini	Early Miocene (Burdigalian)		Italy	A stony coral, a species of Acropora.	
Acropora salentina	Sp. nov	Valid	Wallace & Bosellini	Oligocene (Chattian)		Italy	A stony coral, a species of Acropora.	
Acropora slovenica	Sp. nov	Valid	Wallace & Bosellini	Oligocene (Rupelian)	Gornji Grad beds	Slovenia	A stony coral, a species of Acropora.	
Anisocoenia bhimpuraensis	Sp nov	Valid	Jain	Neogene		India	A stony coral.	
Antillia kathiawarensis	Sp nov	Valid	Jain	Neogene		India	A stony coral.	
Antillocyathus gopiae	Sp nov	Valid	Jain	Neogene		India	A stony coral.	
Arctistrotion	Gen. et 2 sp. et comb. nov	Valid	Fedorowski & Stevens	Carboniferous (Bashkirian)		United States	A colonial coral belonging to the subclass Rugosa and the family Lithostrotionidae. The type species is Arctistrotion variabilis; genus also contains "Lithostrotionella" wahooensis Armstrong (1972) and Arctistrotion simplex.	
Axophyllum cozari	Sp. nov	Valid	Rodríguez & Somerville	Carboniferous (Viséan)		Spain	A rugose coral belonging to the group Stauriida and the family Axophyllidae.	
Axophyllum julianaense	Sp. nov	Valid	Rodríguez & Somerville	Carboniferous (Serpukhovian)		Spain	A rugose coral belonging to the group Stauriida and the family Axophyllidae.	
Axophyllum spinosum	Sp. nov	Valid	Rodríguez & Somerville	Carboniferous (Serpukhovian)		Spain	A rugose coral belonging to the group Stauriida and the family Axophyllidae.	
Axophyllum spiralum	Sp. nov	Valid	Rodríguez & Somerville	Carboniferous (Viséan)		Spain	A rugose coral belonging to the group Stauriida and the family Axophyllidae.	
Balanophyllia feddeni	Sp nov	Valid	Jain	Neogene		India	A stony coral, a species of Balanophyllia.	
Cambroctoconus kyrgyzstanicus	Sp. nov	Valid	Peel in Geyer et al.	Cambrian (Amgan)		Kyrgyzstan	A stem-cnidarian, a species of Cambroctoconus.	
Caryophyllia octamerala	Sp nov	Valid	Jain	Neogene		India	A stony coral, a species of Caryophyllia.	
Cyathoceras miocenica	Sp nov	Valid	Jain	Neogene		India	A stony coral.	
Cyphastrea stellata	Sp nov	Valid	Jain	Neogene		India	A stony coral.	
Dendrophyllia gajaensis	Sp nov	Valid	Jain	Neogene		India	A stony coral, a species of Dendrophyllia.	
Diploastrea gajaensis	Sp nov	Valid	Jain	Neogene		India	A stony coral, a species of Diploastrea.	
Diploastrea khatumbaensis	Sp nov	Valid	Jain	Neogene		India	A stony coral, a species of Diploastrea.	
Favia satyanarayanai	Sp nov	Valid	Jain	Neogene		India	A stony coral, a species of Favia.	
Galaxea indica	Sp nov	Valid	Jain	Neogene		India	A stony coral, a species of Galaxea.	
Haootia	Gen. et sp. nov	Valid	Liu et al.	Late Ediacaran	Fermeuse Formation	Canada	A probable cnidarian, possibly related to Medusozoa. The type species is Haootia quadriformis.	
Halysites miyazakiensis	Sp. nov	Valid	Niko & Adachi	Silurian (Ludlow)	Gionyama Formation	Japan	A tabulate coral belonging to the order Halysitida and the family Halysitidae.	
Leptastrea lowraliensis	Sp nov	Valid	Jain	Neogene		India	A stony coral.	
Montastrea pandeyi	Sp nov	Valid	Jain	Neogene		India	A stony coral.	
Morenaphyllum	Gen. et 2 sp. et comb. nov	Valid	Rodríguez & Somerville	Carboniferous		Kazakhstan; Spain	A rugose coral belonging to the group Stauriida and the family Axophyllidae. The type species is M. antolinense; genus also includes new species M. boyerense, as well as "Carcinophyllum lonsdaleiforme" pauciseptata Bykova (1966) (raised to the rank of a distinct species).	
Multithecopora tobinosuensis	Sp. nov	Valid	Niko, Haikawa & Fujikawa	Carboniferous (Viséan)	Akiyoshi Limestone Group	Japan	A tabulate coral.	
Paraheritschioides compositus	Sp. nov	Valid	Fedorowski & Stevens	Carboniferous (Bashkirian)	Wahoo Limestone	United States	A colonial coral belonging to the subclass Rugosa and the family Kleopatrinidae, a species of Paraheritschioides.	
Paraheritschioides katvalae	Sp. nov	Valid	Fedorowski & Stevens	Carboniferous (Moscovian)	Saginaw Bay Formation	United States	A colonial coral belonging to the subclass Rugosa and the family Kleopatrinidae, a species of Paraheritschioides.	
Pareynia viacrucense	Sp. nov	Valid	Rodríguez & Somerville	Carboniferous (Serpukhovian)		Spain	A rugose coral belonging to the group Stauriida and the family Axophyllidae.	
Sinobryon	Gen. et sp. nov	Valid	Baliński, Sun & Dzik	Ordovician (early Floian)	Fenxiang Formation	China	A hydrozoan, a member of Hydroidolina. The type species is Sinobryon elongatum.	
Thamnopora itoae	Sp. nov	Valid	Niko, Ibaraki & Tazawa	Devonian		Japan	A tabulate coral belonging to the group Favositida and the family Pachyporidae.	
Thurispina	Gen. et sp. nov	Valid	Weyer	Devonian (late Famennian)		Germany	A member of Rugosa. The type species is Thurispina jogi.	
Triadufimia	Gen. et sp. nov	Valid	Fedorowski & Machłajewska	Carboniferous (Serpukhovian)		Poland	A member of Rugosa belonging to the group Stauriida and the family Stereophrentidae. The type species is T. coepta.	
Trochocyathus (Platycyathus) kaliae	Sp nov	Valid	Jain	Neogene		India	A stony coral.	

== Bryozoans ==
=== Newly described bryozoans ===
Name	Novelty	Status	Authors	Age	Unit	Location	Notes	Images
Cupuladria collyrida	Sp. nov	Valid	Herrera-Cubilla & Jackson	Pliocene	Bowden Formation	Jamaica	A species of Cupuladria.	
Ernstipora	Gen. et sp. nov	Valid	Suárez-Andrés & Wyse Jackson	Devonian (Emsian)		Spain	A bryozoan belonging to the group Fenestrata. Genus includes new species E. mackinneyi.	
Pirabasoporella	Gen. et 3 sp. nov	Valid	Zágoršek et al.	Miocene	Baitoa Formation; Chipola Formation; Pirabas Formation	Brazil; Dominican Republic; United States	An ascophoran belonging to the family Jaculinidae. The type species is P. atalaiaensis; genus also includes P. baitoae and P. chipolae.	
Pseudokololophos	Gen. et sp. nov.	Valid	Martha, Taylor, Matsuyama & Scholz	Early Cenomanian	Essen Greensand Formation	Germany	A cyclostome bryozoan. Genus includes new species P. radioporides.	

== Brachiopods ==
Name	Novelty	Status	Authors	Age	Unit	Location	Notes	Images
Acanthocrania elusa	Sp. nov	Valid	Cocks	Late Ordovician		United Kingdom		
Akmolina? tubulus	Sp. nov	Valid	Percival et al.	Cambrian (Furongian)	Sluice Box Formation	New Zealand	A brachiopod belonging to the group Acrotretida and the family Ephippelasmatidae.	
Aksarinaia subtilicrusta	Sp. nov	Valid	Percival & Kruse	Cambrian Series 2		Australia	A brachiopod belonging to the family Obolidae.	
Alpeis	Gen. et comb. nov	Valid	Popov & Cocks	Late Ordovician	Akdombak Formation	Kazakhstan	A member of Orthida belonging to the family Wangyuiidae. The type species is "Mimella" tolenensis Borissiak (1972).	
Ashinaorthis	Gen. et comb. nov	Valid	Popov & Cocks	Late Ordovician	Taldyboi Formation	Kazakhstan	A member of Orthida belonging to the family Plectorthidae. The type species is "Mimella" recta Klenina (1984).	
Athyris africana	Sp. nov	Valid	Schemm-Gregory	Devonian (late Givetian)		Western Sahara	An athyridid brachiopod, a species of Athyris.	
Beethovenia	Gen. et 3 sp. et comb. nov	Valid	García-Alcalde	Devonian (Pragian and Emsian)		Belgium; France; Spain; Germany?	A strophodontid brachiopod. The type species is Beethovenia beethoveni; genus also includes new species B. bachi and B. brahmsi, as well as B. acutiplicata (Oehlert & Davoust, 1879) and possibly "Stropheodonta" steiningeri Drevermann (1907).	
Bokotorthis minuta	Sp. nov	Valid	Popov & Cocks	Late Ordovician	Akdombak Formation	Kazakhstan	A member of the family Plaesiomyidae.	
Boreadorthis sheehani	Sp. nov	Valid	Cocks	Late Ordovician		United Kingdom	A brachiopod.	
Buminomena	Gen. et comb. nov	Valid	Popov & Cocks	Late Ordovician	Taldyboi Formation	Kazakhstan	A member of Strophomenoidea belonging to the family Glyptomenidae. The type species is "Oepikina" abayi Klenina (1984).	
?Chakassilingula undulata	Sp. nov	Valid	Percival & Kruse	Cambrian		Australia		
Chaohochonetes	Gen. et sp. nov	Valid	He & Shi in He et al.	Permian (Changhsingian) to Early Triassic	Talung Formation or Yinkeng Formation	China	A brachiopod belonging the group Chonetidina and to the family Rugosochonetidae. The type species is C. triangusinuata.	
Chonetoidea enbektenensis	Sp. nov	Valid	Popov & Cocks	Late Ordovician	Akdombak Formation	Kazakhstan	A member of Plectambonitoidea belonging to the family Xenambonitidae.	
Christiania nilssoni sholeshookensis	Subsp. nov	Valid	Cocks	Late Ordovician		United Kingdom		
Cirpa alkayae	Sp. nov	Valid	Vörös	Early Jurassic (Pliensbachian)		Turkey	A wellerellid rhynchonellid brachiopod, a species of Cirpa.	
Craniops pristina	Sp. nov	Valid	Popov & Cocks	Late Ordovician	Akdombak Formation	Kazakhstan		
Cryptothyris magnifica	Sp. nov	Valid	Cocks	Late Ordovician		United Kingdom		
Dalmanella kotyrzhalica	Sp. nov	Valid	Popov & Cocks	Late Ordovician	Akdombak Formation	Kazakhstan	A member of Orthida belonging to the family Dalmanellidae.	
Dedzetina major	Sp. nov	Valid	Cocks	Late Ordovician		United Kingdom		
Diambonioidea koknaiensis	Sp. nov	Valid	Popov & Cocks	Late Ordovician	Akdombak Formation	Kazakhstan	A member of Plectambonitoidea belonging to the family Hesperomenidae.	
Enbektenorthis	Gen. et sp. nov	Valid	Popov & Cocks	Late Ordovician	Akdombak Formation	Kazakhstan	A member of Orthida belonging to the family Wangyuiidae. The type species is E. molesta.	
Eostropheodonta portfieldensis	Sp. nov	Valid	Cocks	Late Ordovician		United Kingdom		
Fardenia gwaliae	Sp. nov	Valid	Cocks	Late Ordovician		United Kingdom		
Foliomena xinjiangensis	Sp. nov	Valid	Zhan et al.	Ordovician (late Katian)	Yinpingshan Formation	China		
Gibbodouvillina	Gen et comb. nov	Valid	Jansen	Devonian		Germany; Morocco; Spain; United Kingdom	A member of family Douvillinidae. The type species is "Strophomena" taeniolata G. & F. Sandberger (1856); genus also includes "Orthis" interstrialis Phillips (1841). Announced in 2013; the final version of the article naming it was published in 2014.	
Gigastropheodonta	Gen et comb. nov	Valid	Jansen	Devonian		France; Germany; Morocco; Spain; United Kingdom	A member of family Strophodontidae. The type species is "Leptaena (Strophomena)" gigas McCoy (1852); genus also includes "Boucotstrophia" minor Jahnke (1981), "Boucotstrophia" velica García-Alcalde (1992) and "Boucotstrophia" jahnkei Aït-Malek, Racheboeuf & Lazreq (2000). Announced in 2013; the final version of the article naming it was published in 2014.	
Glyptorthis splendens	Sp. nov	Valid	Cocks	Late Ordovician		United Kingdom		
Gunnarella mcdermotti	Sp. nov	Valid	Cocks	Late Ordovician		United Kingdom		
Harknessella stevensorum	Sp. nov	Valid	Cocks	Late Ordovician		United Kingdom		
Holmerglossa	Gen. et comb. nov	Valid	Popov & Cocks	Ordovician	Taldyboi Formation; Weston Formation	Kazakhstan; United Kingdom	A member of the family Obolidae. The type species is "Pseudolingula" spatula Williams (1974).	
Karathele quadrituberculum	Sp. nov	Valid	Percival & Kruse	Cambrian		Australia	Subsequently transferred to the genus Schizopholis.	
Kassinella kasbalensis	Sp. nov	Valid	Popov & Cocks	Late Ordovician	Akdombak Formation	Kazakhstan	A member of Plectambonitoidea belonging to the family Hesperomenidae.	
Kassinella tarimensis	Sp. nov	Valid	Zhan et al.	Ordovician (late Katian)	Yinpingshan Formation	China		
Kostjubella robusta	Sp. nov	Valid	Percival & Kruse	Cambrian		Australia	A brachiopod belonging to the family Acrotretidae.	
Kozlowskites botobaicus	Sp. nov	Valid	Popov & Cocks	Late Ordovician	Akdombak Formation	Kazakhstan	A member of Plectambonitoidea belonging to the family Sowerbyellidae.	
Kullervo grandis	Sp. nov	Valid	Cocks	Late Ordovician		United Kingdom		
Lambdarina jugowiensis	Sp. nov	Valid	Muszer	Carboniferous (Viséan)	Sokolec Beds	Poland	A member of Rhynchonellida belonging to the family Lambdarinidae.	
Leangella (Leangella) bakanasensis	Sp. nov	Valid	Popov & Cocks	Late Ordovician	Akdombak Formation	Kazakhstan	A member of Plectambonitoidea belonging to the family Leptestiidae.	
Leoniorthis rubeli	Sp. nov	Valid	Hints	Ordovician		Estonia; Russia	A brachiopod belonging to the group Orthida and the family Orthidae.	
Mackerrovia? jinei	Sp. nov	Valid	Cocks	Late Ordovician		United Kingdom		
Maruia	Gen. et sp. nov	Valid	Percival et al.	Cambrian (Furongian)	Sluice Box Formation	New Zealand	A brachiopod, possibly a member of Acrotretida. The type species is M. castellum.	
Meekella? sparsiplicata	Sp. nov	Valid	He & Shi in He et al.	Permian (Changhsingian)	Talung Formation	China	A brachiopod belonging the group Orthotetida and to the family Meekellidae.	
Micromitra georginaensis	Sp. nov	Valid	Percival & Kruse	Cambrian		Australia		
Mirilingula antipodes	Sp. nov	Valid	Percival et al.	Cambrian (Furongian)	Sluice Box Formation	New Zealand	A brachiopod belonging to the group Linguloidea and the family Lingulellotretidae.	
Neochonetes (Huangichonetes?) wufengensis	Sp. nov	Valid	He & Shi in He et al.	Permian (Changhsingian)	Talung Formation	China	A brachiopod belonging the group Chonetidina and to the family Rugosochonetidae.	
Neochonetes (Zhongyingia?) liaoi	Sp. nov	Valid	He & Shi in He et al.	Permian (Wuchiapingian to Changhsingian)	Talung Formation	China	A brachiopod belonging the group Chonetidina and to the family Rugosochonetidae.	
Neoplatystrophia deani	Sp. nov	Valid	Cocks	Late Ordovician		United Kingdom		
Neotreta circularis	Sp. nov	Valid	Percival & Kruse	Cambrian		Australia		
Nicolella crabbi	Sp. nov	Valid	Cocks	Late Ordovician		United Kingdom		
Nisusia granosa	Sp. nov	Valid	Mao, Wang & Zhao	Cambrian	Kaili Formation	China	A brachiopod, a species of Nisusia.	
Orbiculoidea liaoi	Sp. nov	Valid	Zhang et al.	Permian (Lopingian)		China	A brachiopod belonging to the family Discinidae.	
Parapygmochonetes	Gen. et comb. nov	Valid	He & Shi in He et al.	Permian (Changhsingian)	Changxing Formation; Talung Formation	China	A brachiopod belonging the group Chonetidina and to the family Anopliidae. The type species is "Fusiproductus" baoqingensis Liao in Zhao et al. (1981); genus also includes new species P. parvulus He & Shi in He et al..	
Paryphella majiashanensis	Sp. nov	Valid	He & Shi in He et al.	Permian (Changhsingian)	Talung Formation	China	A brachiopod belonging the group Productidina and to the family Productellidae.	
Paryphella minuta	Sp. nov	Valid	He & Shi in He et al.	Permian (Changhsingian)–earliest Triassic	Yinkeng Formation	China	A brachiopod belonging the group Productidina and to the family Productellidae.	
Phragmorthis eximia	Sp. nov	Valid	Popov & Cocks	Late Ordovician	Akdombak Formation	Kazakhstan	A member of Orthida belonging to the family Phragmorthidae.	
Picnotreta leptorhachis	Sp. nov	Valid	Percival & Kruse	Cambrian		Australia		
Plicostropheodonta crassicosta	Sp. nov	Valid	García-Alcalde	Devonian (Emsian)		Spain	A strophodontid brachiopod, a species of Plicostropheodonta.	
Plicostropheodonta latronensis	Sp. nov	Valid	García-Alcalde	Devonian (Emsian)		Spain	A strophodontid brachiopod, a species of Plicostropheodonta.	
Rhenostropheodonta	Gen et sp. et comb. nov	Valid	Jansen	Devonian	Emsquarzit Formation; Hohenrhein Formation; Wiltz Formation	Germany	A member of family Strophodontidae. The type species is R. rhenana; genus also includes "Strophomena" piligera G. & F. Sandberger (1856). Announced in 2013; the final version of the article naming it was published in 2014.	
Rogorthis	Gen. et comb. nov	Valid	Hints	Ordovician (Darriwilian)	Kandle Formation; Pakri Formation	Estonia	A brachiopod belonging to the group Orthida and the family Orthidae. The type species is "Cyrtonotella" pakriensis Rubel (1961).	
Rongatrypa	Gen. et comb. nov	Valid	Popov & Cocks	Late Ordovician	Dulankara Formation; Liujiapo Formation; Namas Formation; Shiyanbe Formation; Taldyboi Formation; Tauken Formation	China; Kazakhstan	A member of Atrypoidea belonging to the family Atrypinidae. The type species is "Nalivkinia (Pronalivkinia)" zvontsovi Nikitin, Popov & Bassett (2003); genus also includes "Rhynchotrema" instabilis Klenina (1984), "Rhynchotrema" rudis Rukavishnikova (1956) and "Nalivkinia (Anabaria)" xichuanensis Xu (1997).	
Salopia posterior	Sp. nov	Valid	Cocks	Late Ordovician		United Kingdom		
Sampo transversa	Sp. nov	Valid	Cocks	Late Ordovician		United Kingdom		
Sericoidea minuta	Sp. nov	Valid	Zhan et al.	Ordovician (late Katian)	Yinpingshan Formation	China		
Spiriferellina fredericksi	Sp. nov	Valid	Tazawa	Permian (Wordian)		Japan; Russia	A spiriferellinid spiriferinid brachiopod.	
Strophomena (Tetraphalerella) namasensis	Sp. nov	Valid	Popov & Cocks	Late Ordovician	Taldyboi Formation	Kazakhstan		
Tethyochonetes rectangularis	Sp. nov	Valid	He & Shi in He et al.	Permian (Changhsingian)	Talung Formation	China	A brachiopod belonging the group Chonetidina and to the family Rugosochonetidae.	
Tethyochonetes? sinuata	Sp. nov	Valid	He & Shi in He et al.	Permian (Changhsingian)		China	A brachiopod belonging the group Chonetidina and to the family Rugosochonetidae.	
Tolen	Gen. et sp. nov	Valid	Holmer, Popov & Bassett	Ordovician (Katian)	Akdombak Formation	Kazakhstan	A brachiopod belonging to the class Chileata and the order Chileida. The type species is T. multicostatus.	
Trifissura	Gen. et comb et sp. nov	Valid	Holmer, Popov & Bassett	Silurian	Coalbrookdale Formation	Sweden; United Kingdom	A brachiopod belonging to the class Chileata and the order Chileida. The type species is "Obolus" davidsoni var. transversus Salter in Davidson (1866) (raised to the rank of the separate species Trifissura transversa); genus also includes new species T. rigida.	
Triplesia hintsae	Sp. nov	Valid	Cocks	Late Ordovician		United Kingdom		
Wrightiops	Gen. et comb. nov	Valid	Popov & Cocks	Late Ordovician	Taldyboi Formation	Kazakhstan	A member of the family Craniopsidae. The type species is "Paracraniops" nikitini Goriansky (1972).	

== Conodonts ==
=== Newly described conodonts ===
Name	Novelty	Status	Authors	Age	Unit	Location	Notes	Images
Acodus? chingizicus	Sp. nov	Valid	Tolmacheva	Ordovician (Tremadocian)		Kazakhstan		
Acuminatella binodosa	Sp. nov	Valid	Orchard	Late Triassic	Pardonet Formation	Canada	A member of Gondolellidae.	
Acuminatella constricta	Sp. nov	Valid	Orchard	Late Triassic	Pardonet Formation	Canada	A member of Gondolellidae.	
Acuminatella curvata	Sp. nov	Valid	Orchard	Late Triassic	Pardonet Formation	Canada	A member of Gondolellidae.	
Acuminatella denticulata	Sp. nov	Valid	Orchard	Late Triassic	Pardonet Formation	Canada	A member of Gondolellidae.	
Acuminatella? extensa	Sp. nov	Valid	Orchard	Late Triassic	Pardonet Formation	Canada	A member of Gondolellidae.	
Acuminatella longicarinata	Sp. nov	Valid	Orchard	Late Triassic	Pardonet Formation	Canada	A member of Gondolellidae.	
Acuminatella? prima	Sp. nov	Valid	Orchard	Late Triassic	Pardonet Formation	Canada	A member of Gondolellidae.	
Acuminatella sagittale	Sp. nov	Valid	Orchard	Late Triassic	Pardonet Formation	Canada	A member of Gondolellidae.	
Acuminatella sinuosa	Sp. nov	Valid	Orchard	Late Triassic	Pardonet Formation	Canada	A member of Gondolellidae.	
Belodina longxianensis minor	Subsp. nov	Valid	Cai, Yuan & Wu	Late Ordovician	Lianglitag Formation	China	A subspecies of Belodina longxianensis.	
Carnepigondolella anitae	Sp. nov	Valid	Orchard	Late Triassic	Ludington Formation	Canada	A member of Gondolellidae.	
Carnepigondolella gibsoni	Sp. nov	Valid	Orchard	Late Triassic	Ludington Formation	Canada	A member of Gondolellidae.	
Carnepigondolella milanae	Sp. nov	Valid	Orchard	Late Triassic	Pardonet Formation	Canada	A member of Gondolellidae.	
Carnepigondolella postsamueli	Sp. nov	Valid	Orchard	Late Triassic	Pardonet Formation	Canada	A member of Gondolellidae.	
Carnepigondolella spenceri	Sp. nov	Valid	Orchard	Late Triassic	Pardonet Formation	Canada	A member of Gondolellidae.	
Chiganodus	Gen. et sp. nov	Valid	Tolmacheva	Ordovician (Tremadocian)		Kazakhstan	The type species is C. parilis.	
Cruxodus	Gen. et sp. nov	Valid	Tolmacheva	Early Ordovician		Kyrgyzstan	The type species is C. tretiakovi.	
Furnishina holmi	Sp. nov	Valid	Bagnoli & Stouge	Cambrian (late Furongian)	Alum Shale Formation	Sweden	A species of Furnishina.	
Gobduntaulepis	Nom. nov	Valid	Doweld	Early Ordovician		Uzbekistan	A replacement name for Acantholepis Pianovskij in Pianovskij, Pianovskaja & Aleksandrova, 1989 (preoccupied).	
Hindeodus microdentatus	Sp. nov	Valid	Wu et al.	Permian–Triassic boundary		China	A species of Hindeodus.	
Histiodella levis	Sp. nov	Valid	Tolmacheva	Ordovician (Darriwilian)		Kazakhstan		
Icriodella rhodesi	Sp. nov	Valid	Bergström & Ferretti	Late Ordovician	Keisley Limestone	United Kingdom	A species of Icriodella.	
Kraussodontus ludingtonensis	Sp. nov	Valid	Orchard	Late Triassic	Ludington Formation; Pardonet Formation	Canada	A member of Gondolellidae.	
Kraussodontus margaretae	Sp. nov	Valid	Orchard	Late Triassic	Pardonet Formation	Canada	A member of Gondolellidae.	
Kraussodontus roberti	Sp. nov	Valid	Orchard	Late Triassic	Pardonet Formation	Canada	A member of Gondolellidae.	
Kraussodontus rosiae	Sp. nov	Valid	Orchard	Late Triassic	Pardonet Formation	Canada	A member of Gondolellidae.	
Kraussodontus urbanae	Sp. nov	Valid	Orchard	Late Triassic	Pardonet Formation	Canada	A member of Gondolellidae.	
Kraussodontus vancouverense	Sp. nov	Valid	Orchard	Late Triassic	Pardonet Formation	Canada	A member of Gondolellidae.	
Kraussodontus wendae	Sp. nov	Valid	Orchard	Late Triassic	Pardonet Formation	Canada	A member of Gondolellidae.	
Metapolygnathus dylani	Sp. nov	Valid	Orchard	Late Triassic	Pardonet Formation	Canada	A member of Gondolellidae.	
Neogondolella prediscreta	Sp. nov	Valid	Wu et al.	Earliest Triassic		China	A species of Neogondolella.	
Norigondolella norica	Sp. nov	Valid	Orchard	Late Triassic	Pardonet Formation	Canada	A member of Gondolellidae.	
Parafurnishius	Gen. et sp. nov	Valid	Yang et al.	Early Triassic (Induan)	Feixianguan Formation	China	A member of Ellisoniidae. The type species is Parafurnishius xuanhanensis.	
Parapetella beattyi	Sp. nov	Valid	Orchard	Late Triassic	Pardonet Formation	Canada	A member of Gondolellidae.	
Parapetella broatchae	Sp. nov	Valid	Orchard	Late Triassic	Pardonet Formation	Canada	A member of Gondolellidae.	
Parapetella clareae	Sp. nov	Valid	Orchard	Late Triassic	Pardonet Formation	Canada	A member of Gondolellidae.	
Parapetella columbiense	Sp. nov	Valid	Orchard	Late Triassic	Pardonet Formation	Canada	A member of Gondolellidae.	
Parapetella cordillerense	Sp. nov	Valid	Orchard	Late Triassic	Pardonet Formation	Canada	A member of Gondolellidae.	
Parapetella destinae	Sp. nov	Valid	Orchard	Late Triassic	Pardonet Formation	Canada	A member of Gondolellidae.	
Parapetella elegantula	Sp. nov	Valid	Orchard	Late Triassic	Pardonet Formation	Canada	A member of Gondolellidae.	
Parapetella hillarae	Sp. nov	Valid	Orchard	Late Triassic	Pardonet Formation	Canada	A member of Gondolellidae.	
Parapetella irwini	Sp. nov	Valid	Orchard	Late Triassic	Pardonet Formation	Canada	A member of Gondolellidae.	
Parapetella johnpauli	Sp. nov	Valid	Orchard	Late Triassic	Pardonet Formation	Canada	A member of Gondolellidae.	
Parapetella lanei	Sp. nov	Valid	Orchard	Late Triassic	Pardonet Formation	Canada	A member of Gondolellidae.	
Parapetella posterolata	Sp. nov	Valid	Orchard	Late Triassic	Pardonet Formation	Canada	A member of Gondolellidae.	
Parapetella prominens angulare	Subsp. nov	Valid	Orchard	Late Triassic	Pardonet Formation	Canada	A member of Gondolellidae.	
Parapetella prominens circulare	Subsp. nov	Valid	Orchard	Late Triassic	Pardonet Formation	Canada	A member of Gondolellidae.	
Parapetella prominens prominens	Subsp. nov	Valid	Orchard	Late Triassic	Pardonet Formation	Canada	A member of Gondolellidae.	
Parapetella pumilio	Sp. nov	Valid	Orchard	Late Triassic	Pardonet Formation	Canada	A member of Gondolellidae.	
Parapetella riteri	Sp. nov	Valid	Orchard	Late Triassic	Pardonet Formation	Canada	A member of Gondolellidae.	
Parapetella rubae	Sp. nov	Valid	Orchard	Late Triassic	Pardonet Formation	Canada	A member of Gondolellidae.	
Parapetella willifordi	Sp. nov	Valid	Orchard	Late Triassic	Pardonet Formation	Canada	A member of Gondolellidae.	
Polygnathus alkhovikovae	Sp. nov	Valid	Baranov, Slavík & Blodgett	Devonian (early Emsian)		Russia	A polygnathid, a species of Polygnathus.	
Polygnathus aragonensis	Sp. nov	Valid	Martínez-Pérez & Valenzuela-Ríos	Early Devonian	Basibé Formation	Spain	A polygnathid, a species of Polygnathus.	
Polygnathus arthuri	Sp. nov	Valid	Baranov, Slavík & Blodgett	Devonian (early Emsian)		Russia	A polygnathid, a species of Polygnathus.	
Polygnathus bardashevi	Sp. nov	Valid	Baranov, Slavík & Blodgett	Devonian (early Emsian)		Russia	A polygnathid, a species of Polygnathus.	
Polygnathus carlsi	Sp. nov	Valid	Martínez-Pérez & Valenzuela-Ríos	Early Devonian	Basibé Formation	Spain	A polygnathid, a species of Polygnathus.	
Polygnathus communis longanensis	Subsp. nov	Valid	Qie et al.	Carboniferous (latest Tournaisian)	Long'an Formation	China	A polygnathid, a subspecies of Polygnathus communis.	
Polygnathus dujieensis	Sp. nov	Valid	Qie et al.	Carboniferous (latest Tournaisian)	Long'an Formation	China	A polygnathid, a species of Polygnathus.	
Polygnathus ivanowskyii	Sp. nov	Valid	Baranov, Slavík & Blodgett	Devonian (early Emsian)		Russia	A polygnathid, a species of Polygnathus.	
Polygnathus karsteni	Sp. nov	Valid	Baranov, Slavík & Blodgett	Devonian (early Emsian)		Russia	A polygnathid, a species of Polygnathus.	
Polygnathus lezhoevi	Sp. nov	Valid	Baranov, Slavík & Blodgett	Devonian (early Emsian)		Russia	A polygnathid, a species of Polygnathus.	
Polygnathus michaelmurphyi	Sp. nov	Valid	Baranov, Slavík & Blodgett	Devonian (early Emsian)		Russia	A polygnathid, a species of Polygnathus.	
Polygnathus ramoni	Sp. nov	Valid	Martínez-Pérez & Valenzuela-Ríos	Early Devonian	Basibé Formation	Spain	A polygnathid, a species of Polygnathus.	
Polygnathus settedabanicus	Sp. nov	Valid	Baranov, Slavík & Blodgett	Devonian (early Emsian)		Russia	A polygnathid, a species of Polygnathus.	
Polygnathus yakutensis	Sp. nov	Valid	Baranov, Slavík & Blodgett	Devonian (early Emsian)		Russia	A polygnathid, a species of Polygnathus.	
Primatella bifida	Sp. nov	Valid	Orchard	Late Triassic	Pardonet Formation	Canada	A member of Gondolellidae.	
Primatella circulare	Sp. nov	Valid	Orchard	Late Triassic	Pardonet Formation	Canada	A member of Gondolellidae.	
Primatella elongata	Sp. nov	Valid	Orchard	Late Triassic	Pardonet Formation	Canada	A member of Gondolellidae.	
Primatella mclearni	Sp. nov	Valid	Orchard	Late Triassic	Pardonet Formation	Canada	A member of Gondolellidae.	
Primatella oblonga	Sp. nov	Valid	Orchard	Late Triassic	Pardonet Formation	Canada	A member of Gondolellidae.	
Primatella ovale	Sp. nov	Valid	Orchard	Late Triassic	Pardonet Formation	Canada	A member of Gondolellidae.	
Primatella posteroglobosa	Sp. nov	Valid	Orchard	Late Triassic	Pardonet Formation	Canada	A member of Gondolellidae.	
Primatella rectangulare	Sp. nov	Valid	Orchard	Late Triassic	Pardonet Formation	Canada	A member of Gondolellidae.	
Primatella rhomboidale	Sp. nov	Valid	Orchard	Late Triassic	Pardonet Formation	Canada	A member of Gondolellidae.	
Primatella rotunda	Sp. nov	Valid	Orchard	Late Triassic	Pardonet Formation	Canada	A member of Gondolellidae.	
Primatella stanleyi	Sp. nov	Valid	Orchard	Late Triassic	Pardonet Formation	Canada	A member of Gondolellidae.	
Primatella subquadrata	Sp. nov	Valid	Orchard	Late Triassic	Pardonet Formation	Canada	A member of Gondolellidae.	
Primatella triangulare	Sp. nov	Valid	Orchard	Late Triassic	Pardonet Formation	Canada	A member of Gondolellidae.	
Primatella vanlierae	Sp. nov	Valid	Orchard	Late Triassic	Pardonet Formation	Canada	A member of Gondolellidae.	
Quadralella deflecta	Sp. nov	Valid	Orchard	Late Triassic	Pardonet Formation	Canada	A member of Gondolellidae.	
Quadralella karenae	Sp. nov	Valid	Orchard	Late Triassic	Pardonet Formation	Canada	A member of Gondolellidae.	
Quadralella kathleenae	Sp. nov	Valid	Orchard	Late Triassic	Pardonet Formation	Canada	A member of Gondolellidae.	
Quadralella mcrobertsi	Sp. nov	Valid	Orchard	Late Triassic	Pardonet Formation	Canada	A member of Gondolellidae.	
Quadralella pardoneti	Sp. nov	Valid	Orchard	Late Triassic	Pardonet Formation	Canada	A member of Gondolellidae.	
Quadralella posteroexpansa	Sp. nov	Valid	Orchard	Late Triassic	Ludington Formation	Canada	A member of Gondolellidae.	
Quadralella postlobata	Sp. nov	Valid	Orchard	Late Triassic	Pardonet Formation	Canada	A member of Gondolellidae.	
Quadralella praecommunisti curvata	Subsp. nov	Valid	Orchard	Late Triassic	Pardonet Formation	Canada	A member of Gondolellidae.	
Quadralella praecommunisti ornata	Subsp. nov	Valid	Orchard	Late Triassic	Pardonet Formation	Canada	A member of Gondolellidae.	
Quadralella roysi	Sp. nov	Valid	Orchard	Late Triassic	Pardonet Formation	Canada	A member of Gondolellidae.	
Quadralella sigmoidale	Sp. nov	Valid	Orchard	Late Triassic	Pardonet Formation	Canada	A member of Gondolellidae.	
Quadralella willistonense	Sp. nov	Valid	Orchard	Late Triassic	Pardonet Formation	Canada	A member of Gondolellidae.	
Siphonodella nandongensis	Sp. nov	Valid	Li et al.	Early Carboniferous	Baping Formation	China	A species of Siphonodella.	
Westergaardodina asinina	Sp. nov	Valid	Bagnoli & Stouge	Cambrian (late Furongian)	Alum Shale Formation	Sweden	A species of Westergaardodina.	

== Amphibians ==
=== Basalmost tetrapods ===
Name	Novelty	Status	Authors	Age	Unit	Location	Notes	Images
Webererpeton	Gen. et sp. nov	Valid	Clément & Lebedev	Late Devonian (late Frasnian)	Probably Smota-Lovat' Formation	Russia	A member of Elginerpetontidae. The type species is Weberepeton sondalensis.	

=== Temnospondyls ===
==== Research ====
- Specimens of Micromelerpeton crederni with abnormalities in their limbs interpreted as a result of limb regeneration are described by Fröbisch, Bickelmann and Witzmann (2014).
- Redescription of Mahavisaurus dentatus and Lyrosaurus australis and a study on the phylogenetic relationships of the rhytidosteids is published by Maganuco, Pasini & Auditore (2014).

==== New taxa ====
Name	Novelty	Status	Authors	Age	Unit	Location	Notes	Images
Antarctosuchus	Gen. et sp. nov	Valid	Sidor, Steyer & Hammer	Middle Triassic	Fremouw Formation	Antarctica	A capitosauroid. The type species is Antarctosuchus polyodon.	
Leptorophus raischi	Sp. nov	Valid	Schoch	Early Permian	Saar–Nahe Basin	Germany	A branchiosaurid, a species of Leptorophus.	
Megalophthalma	Gen. et sp. nov	Valid	Schoch, Milner & Witzmann	Middle Triassic (late Ladinian)	Erfurt Formation	Germany	A plagiosaurid. The type species is Megalophthalma ockerti.	
Nanobamus	Gen. et sp. nov	Valid	Schoch & Milner	Early Permian	Arroyo Formation	United States	An amphibamid. The type species is Nanobamus macrorhinus.	

=== Chroniosuchians ===
Name	Novelty	Status	Authors	Age	Unit	Location	Notes	Images
Dromotectum abditum	Sp. nov	Valid	Shishkin, Novikov & Fortuny	Early Triassic		Russia	A bystrowianid chroniosuchian, a species of Dromotectum.	
Dromotectum largum	Sp. nov	Valid	Liu et al.	Late Permian	Shangshihezi Formation	China	A bystrowianid chroniosuchian, a species of Dromotectum.	
Jiyuanitectum	Gen. et sp. nov	Valid	Liu et al.	Late Permian	Shangshihezi Formation	China	A bystrowianid chroniosuchian. The type species is Jiyuanitectum flatum.	
Vyushkoviana	Gen. et sp. nov	Valid	Shishkin, Novikov & Fortuny	Early Triassic		Russia	A bystrowianid chroniosuchian. The type species is Vyushkoviana operta.	

=== Lissamphibians ===
==== Research ====
- The humerus bone of a large calyptocephalellid anuran, apparently one of the largest fossil anurans known to date, is described by Otero et al. (2014) from the Eocene of Chile.

==== New taxa ====
Name	Novelty	Status	Authors	Age	Unit	Location	Notes	Images
Eopelobates deani	Sp. nov	Valid	Roček et al.	Early middle Eocene	Green River Formation	United States	A relative of the European spadefoot toads, a species of Eopelobates.	

== Synapsids ==
=== Non-mammalian synapsids ===
==== Research ====
- A study on the diel activity patterns of non-mammalian synapsids is published by Angielczyk & Schmitz (2014).
- The presence of plicidentine (infolded dentine around the base of the tooth root) is reported in the maxillary and dentary teeth of Ianthodon, Sphenacodon, Secodontosaurus and Dimetrodon by Brink, LeBlanc & Reisz (2014).
- A study of the anatomy of nasal cavity of Brasilitherium riograndensis is published by Ruf et al. (2014).
- A study of the anatomy of the therocephalian Simorhinella baini and a taxonomic re-evaluation of the family Lycosuchidae is published by Abdala et al. (2014).

==== New taxa ====
Name	Novelty	Status	Authors	Age	Unit	Location	Notes	Images
Abajudon	Gen. et sp. nov	Valid	Angielczyk et al.	Permian	Madumabisa Mudstone; Ruhuhu Formation	Tanzania; Zambia	A dicynodont of uncertain phylogenetic placement. The type species is Abajudon kaayai.	
Alierasaurus	Gen. et sp. nov	Valid	Romano & Nicosia	Permian	Cala del Vino Formation	Italy	A caseid. The type species is Alierasaurus ronchii.	
Botucaraitherium	Gen. et sp. nov	Valid	Soares, Martinelli & De Oliveira	Late Triassic (possibly early Norian)	Riograndia Assemblage Zone of the Candelária Sequence (Caturrita Formation)	Brazil	A prozostrodontian cynodont. The type species is Botucaraitherium belarminoi.	
Eocasea	Gen. et sp. nov	Valid	Reisz & Fröbisch	Carboniferous (late Pennsylvanian)	Calhoun Shale	United States	A member of Caseidae . The type species is Eocasea martini.	
Sungeodon	Gen. et sp. nov	Valid	Maisch & Matzke	Early Triassic	Jiucaiyuan Formation	China	A kannemeyeriiform dicynodont . The type species is Sungeodon kimkraemerae.	

== Other animals ==
Name	Novelty	Status	Authors	Age	Unit	Location	Notes	Images
Archiasterella charma	Sp. nov	Valid	Moore, Li & Porter	Early Cambrian	Puerto Blanco Formation; Shiyantou Formation	China; Mexico	A member of Chancelloriida.	
Ascarites rufferi	Sp. nov	Valid	Da Silva et al.	Middle Triassic (Ladinian)	Sítio Cortado site	Brazil	An ascaridid nematode found in a cynodont coprolite, a species of Ascarites.	
Ashetscolex	Gen. et sp. nov	Valid	Muir et al.	Ordovician (earliest Floian)	Tonggao Formation	China	A palaeoscolecid worm. The type species is Ashetscolex nuppus.	
Atraktoprion podolicus	Sp. nov	Valid	Szaniawski & Drygant	Early Devonian (middle Lochkovian to Pragian)		Ukraine	An atraktoprionid polychaete, a species of Atraktoprion.	
Attenuella	Gen. et comb. nov	Valid	Malinky	Cambrian (Furongian)	Mendha Formation	United States	A member of Hyolitha. The type species is "Hyolithes" attenuatus Walcott (1890).	
Bicoelia corticifera	Sp. nov	Valid	Senowbari-Daryan & Link	Late Triassic (Norian)	Kasımlar Formation	Turkey	A demosponge belonging to the order Agelasida and the family Preperonidellidae.	
Brevaspidella	Gen. et sp. nov	Valid	Rhebergen	Late Ordovician		Germany; Netherlands; Sweden	A demosponge belonging to the family Anthaspidellidae. The type species is B. dispersa.	
Bubiites	Gen. et sp. nov	Valid	Yang et al.	Cambrian (Terreneuvian)	Zhujiaqing Formation	China	A sclerite of an animal of uncertain phylogenetic placement. The type species is B. simplex.	
Cambroskiadeion	Gen. et sp. nov	Valid	Moore, Porter & Li	Early Cambrian	Dengying Formation	China	An animal of uncertain phylogenetic placement with a cap-shaped shell. The type species is Cambroskiadeion xiaowanense.	
Claviconchella	Gen. et sp. nov	Valid	Yang et al.	Cambrian (Terreneuvian)	Zhujiaqing Formation	China	A sclerite of an animal of uncertain phylogenetic placement. The type species is C. qianyii.	
Conchicolites crispisulcans	Sp. nov	Valid	Vinn, Jarochowska & Munnecke	Silurian (Wenlock)	Halla Formation	Sweden	A member of Cornulitida (a group of animals of uncertain phylogenetic placement, possibly molluscs), a species of Conchicolites.	
Eklexibella	Gen. et 2 sp. nov	Valid	Keupp, Gründel & Wiese	Early Jurassic (late Pliensbachian)		Germany	A terebellid polychaete. Genus contains two species: Eklexibella buttenheimensis and Eklexibella johanni.	
Enalikter	Gen. et sp. nov	Valid	Siveter et al.	Silurian	Herefordshire Lagerstätte	United Kingdom	An animal of uncertain phylogenetic placement; it might be a megacheiran arthropod or an annelid. The type species is Enalikter aphson.	
Eopriapulites	Gen. et sp. nov	Valid	Liu & Xiao in Liu et al.	Cambrian (Fortunian)	Kuanchuanpu Formation	China	A priapulid-like scalidophoran. The type species is Eopriapulites sphinx.	
Eximipriapulus	Gen. et sp. nov	Valid	Ma et al.	Cambrian	Chengjiang Lagerstätte	China	A member of Priapulida. The type species is Eximipriapulus globocaudatus.	
Filihernodia	Gen. et sp. nov	Valid	Taylor & Wilson in Frey et al.	Early Devonian (Pragian)		Morocco	A reptariid hederellid. The type species is Filihernodia buccina.	
Haplistion toftanum	Sp. nov	Valid	Rhebergen & Botting	Silurian (Telychian)		Sweden	A haplistiid spirosclerophorid demosponge, a species of Haplistion.	
Haydenoconus	Gen. et comb. nov	Valid	Malinky	Cambrian (Miaolingian and Furongian)		United States	A member of Hyolitha belonging to the family Angusticornidae. The type species is "Hyolithes" gallatinensis Resser (1938); genus also includes "Hyolithes" prolixus Resser (1939).	
Hyalonema vetteri	Sp. nov	Valid	Janussen	Late Cretaceous (Coniacian)	Arnager Formation	Denmark	A hexactinellid sponge, a species of Hyalonema.	
Lindstroemispongia	Gen. et sp. nov	Valid	Rhebergen & Botting	Silurian (Telychian)		Sweden	An astylospongiid streptosclerophorid demosponge. The type species is Lindstroemispongia cylindrata.	
Lyrarapax	Gen. et sp. nov	Valid	Cong et al.	Early Cambrian		China	A member of Anomalocarididae (a group of animals with uncertain phylogenetic placement, possibly stem-arthropods). The type species is Lyrarapax unguispinus.	
Multistella leipnitzae	Sp. nov	Valid	Rhebergen & Botting	Silurian (Telychian)		Sweden	An anthaspidellid orchocladine demosponge, a species of Multistella.	
Nesonektris	Gen. et sp. nov	Valid	García-Bellido et al.	Cambrian	Emu Bay Shale	Australia	A member of Vetulicolida. The type species is Nesonektris aldridgei.	
Nidelric	Gen. et sp. nov	Valid	Hou et al.	Early Cambrian	Heilinpu Formation	China	An animal of uncertain phylogenetic placement; a member of Chancelloriida or a chancelloriid-like animal. The type species is Nidelric pugio.	
Norvegiograptus	Gen. et comb. nov	Valid	Li et al.	Early Ordovician		China; Norway	A graptolite belonging to the family Dichograptidae. A new genus for "Didymograptus" liber Monsen (1937); genus also includes "Didymograptus" enshiensis Ni in Mu et al. (1979).	
Oikozetetes mounti	Sp. nov	Valid	Jacquet, Brock & Paterson	Early Cambrian	Mernmerna Formation	Australia	A member of Halkieriidae (a group of animals of uncertain phylogenetic placement, possibly molluscs), a species of Oikozetetes.	
Opetionella incompta	Sp. nov	Valid	Rhebergen & Botting	Silurian (Telychian)		Sweden	A demosponge, possibly a member of the group Hadromerida; a species of Opetionella.	
Paleoxyuris	Gen. et sp. nov	Valid	Hugot et al.	Triassic	Sítio Cortado site	Brazil	A heteroxynematid oxyurid nematode known from an egg found in a cynodont coprolite. The type species is Paleoxyuris cockburni.	
Phragmodictya jinshaensis	Sp. nov	Valid	Xinglian et al.	Cambrian		China	A hexactinellid sponge, a species of Phragmodictya.	
Polychaetaspis kozlowskii	Sp. nov	Valid	Szaniawski & Drygant	Early Devonian (early Lochkovian)		Ukraine	A polychaetaspid polychaete, a species of Polychaetaspis.	
Postperissocoelia	Gen. et comb. et sp. nov	Valid	Rhebergen & Botting	Silurian		Canada; Sweden	A streptosolenid orchocladine demosponge. A new genus for "Perissocoelia" spinosa Rigby & Chatterton (1989); genus also contains new species Postperissocoelia gnisvardensis.	
Pseudoperipatus	Gen. et sp. nov	Valid	Haug & Haug	Cambrian	Burgess Shale	Canada	A cycloneuralian worm. The type species is Pseudoperipatus hintelmannae.	
Sanduscolex	Gen. et sp. nov	Valid	Muir et al.	Ordovician (earliest Floian)	Tonggao Formation	China	A palaeoscolecid worm. The type species is Sanduscolex regularis.	
Urphaenomenospongia	Gen. et sp. nov	Valid	Rhebergen & Botting	Silurian (Telychian)		Sweden	A glass sponge, possibly a member of Lyssacinosida. The type species is Urphaenomenospongia euplectelloides.	
Waflascolex	Gen. et sp. nov	Valid	Wang et al.	Ordovician (Tremadocian)		China	A palaeoscolecid worm. The type species is Waflascolex changdensis.	
Wiwaxia foliosa	Sp. nov	Valid	Yang et al.	Cambrian	Hongjingshao Formation	China	An animal of uncertain phylogenetic placement, a species of Wiwaxia.	
Yuganotheca	Gen. et sp. nov	Valid	Zhang, Li & Holmer in Zhang et al.	Cambrian	Heilinpu Formation	China	A member of Lophophorata of uncertain phylogenetic placement. The type species is Yuganotheca elegans.	

== Other organisms ==
Name	Novelty	Status	Authors	Age	Unit	Location	Notes	Images
Cyathus dominicanus	Sp. nov	Valid	Poinar	Eocene or Miocene	Dominican amber	Dominican Republic	A fungus, a species of Cyathus.	
Elainabella	Gen. et sp. nov	Valid	Rowland & Rodriguez	Ediacaran	Deep Spring Formation	United States	A multicellular alga of uncertain phylogenetic placement. Genus includes new species E. deepspringensis.	
Eopalaeoaplysina	Gen. et sp. nov	Valid	Anderson & Beauchamp	Carboniferous (Moscovian to Kasimovian)	Belcourt Formation; Ely Limestone; Nansen Formation	Canada; United States	A red alga, a relative of Palaeoaplysina. Genus includes new species E. daviesi.	
Helmutella	Gen. et sp. nov	Valid	Krings & Taylor	Early Devonian	Rhynie chert	United Kingdom	A fungus described on the basis of a reproductive unit. Genus includes new species H. devonica.	
Nidula baltica	Sp. nov	Valid	Poinar	Eocene	Baltic amber	Russia (Kaliningrad Oblast)	A fungus, a species of Nidula.	
Nilpenia	Gen. et sp. nov	Valid	Droser et al.	Precambrian	Ediacara Fossil Site at Nilpena, Flinders Ranges	Australia	"An organism of unknown affinities with a growth pattern convergent on that of extant fungi, lichens and encrusting algae". The type species is Nilpenia rossi.	
Palaeogaster	Gen. et sp. nov	Valid	Poinar, Alfredo & Baseia	Early Cretaceous (late Albian)		Myanmar	A fungus belonging to the group Sclerodermatineae. The type species is Palaeogaster micromorpha.	
Plexus	Gen. et sp. nov	Valid	Joel, Droser & Gehling	Precambrian		Australia	A tubular, serially divided organism with a bilateral morphology of uncertain phylogenetic placement. The type species is Plexus ricei.	
Wutubus	Gen. et sp. nov	Valid	Chen et al.	Precambrian	Dengying Formation	China	An annulated tubular organism of uncertain phylogenetic placement. The type species is Wutubus annularis.	
Xylaria antiqua	Sp. nov	Valid	Poinar	Eocene or Miocene		Dominican Republic	A fungus belonging to the family Xylariaceae found in Dominican amber, a species of Xylaria.	
