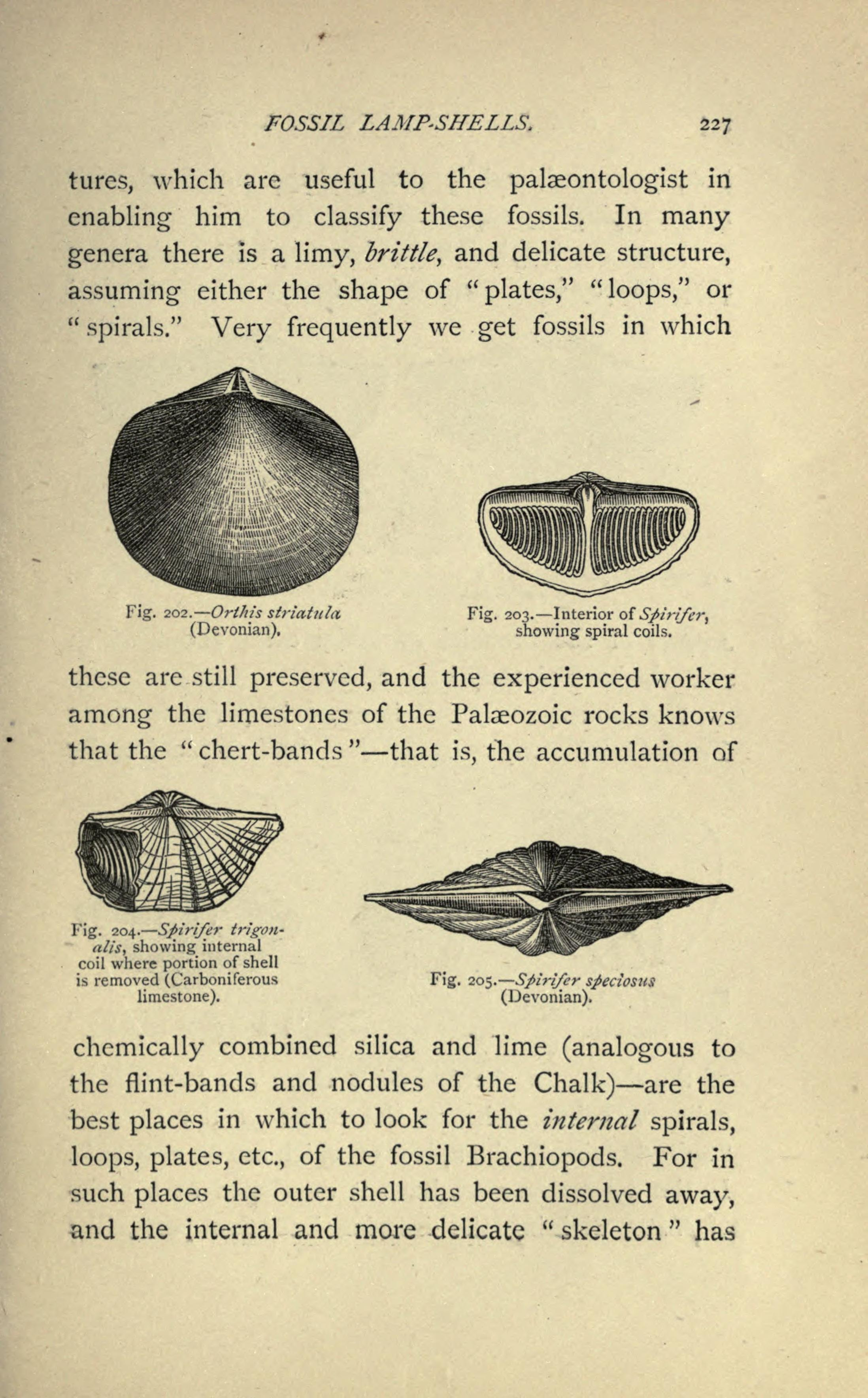

Scientific classification
- Kingdom: Animalia
- Phylum: Brachiopoda
- Class: Rhynchonellata
- Order: Orthida
- Family: Orthidae
- Genus: Orthis
- Species: O. striatula

Binomial name
- Orthis striatula (von Schlotheim, 1813)

= Orthis striatula =

Extinct species of marine lamp shell

Orthis striatula is an extinct species of brachiopod. The fossils are present in the middle Devonian.
