= Parvigondolella =

Parvigondolella Temporal range: Late Triassic, Norian–Rhaetian

Scientific classification
- Kingdom: Animalia
- Phylum: Chordata
- Infraphylum: Agnatha
- Class: †Conodonta
- Genus: †Parvigondolella; Kozur & Mock, 1972

Type species
- Parvigondolella andrusovi † Kozur & Mock, 1972

Other species
- †P. lata? Kozur & Mock, 1974; †P. prorhaetica? Kozur & Mock, 1991 sensu Moix et al., 2007; †P. rhaetica? Mostler, 1978; †P. vrielyncki? Kozur & Mock, 1991

Extinct genus of jawless fishes

Parvigondolella is an extinct genus of Late Triassic (late Norian-earliest Rhaetian) conodonts. The most common species in the genus, Parvigondolella andrusovi, is used as an index fossil for part of the Sevatian substage of the Norian stage. Kozur & Mock, 1991 named two additional species, P. rhaetica and P. vrielyncki. Moix et al. (2007) later argued that "Misikella" rhaetica was a species of Parvigondolella. In order to prevent having two different species with the same name within the genus, they renamed Kozur & Mock (1991)'s P. rhaetica to P. prorhaetica. However, this would be unnecessary if "Misikella" rhaetica was not related to Parvigondolella. Parvigondolella is typically considered a direct descendant of Mockina/Epigondolella bidentata.
