= Mockina =

Mockina Temporal range: Late Triassic, Norian–Rhaetian

Scientific classification
- Kingdom: Animalia
- Phylum: Chordata
- Infraphylum: Agnatha
- Class: †Conodonta
- Genus: †Mockina; Kozur, 1972

Type species
- Mockina postera † Kozur & Mostler, 1971

Other species
- †M. bidentata Mosher, 1968; †M. matthewi Orchard, 1991; †M. medionorica Kozur, 2003; †M. multidentata? Mosher, 1970; †M. serrulata Orchard, 1991; †M. slovakensis Kozur, 1972; †M. spiculata Orchard, 1991; †M. spinosa? Orchard, 2018; †M. tozeri Orchard, 1991; †M. transitia? Orchard, 1991; †M. vrielyncki? Kozur & Mock, 1972; †M. zapfei? Kozur, 1973

Extinct genus of jawless fishes

Mockina is an extinct genus of Late Triassic (mid Norian-early Rhaetian) conodonts. Several species of Mockina are used as index fossils for the Alaunian (middle Norian) and Sevatian (late Norian) substages of the Triassic. One species, Mockina bidentata, is considered to be ancestral to Misikella and Parvigondolella, some of the last known genera of conodonts. Mockina has occasionally been synonymized with Epigondolella based on the assumption that it represents Epigondolella specimens which live in resource-poor environments. Mockina/Epigondolella multidentata has occasionally been considered to belong to its own genus, Orchardella.
