= Schizophoria =

Schizophoria Temporal range: Devonian-Permian ~436–252 Ma

Scientific classification
- Domain: Eukaryota
- Kingdom: Animalia
- Phylum: Brachiopoda
- Class: Rhynchonellata
- Order: †Orthida
- Superfamily: †Enteletoidea
- Family: †Schizophoriidae
- Genus: †Schizophoria

Species
- See text

Extinct genus of brachiopod

Schizophoria is an extinct genus of brachiopod belonging to the superfamily Enteletoidea. Specimens have been found in Devonian through Permian beds in North America, Australia, central and southeast Asia, and eastern Europe.

== Species ==
- S. amanaensis Stainbrook, 1945
- S. annanaensis Stainbrook, 1945
- S. oklahomae
- S. chouteauensis Weller, 1914
- S. depressa Easton, 1962
- S. kintaensis Shi and Waterhouse, 1991
- S. kutsingensis Grabau, 1932
- S. lata Stainbrook, 1940
- S. nevadaensis Merriam 1940
- S. paraprima Johnson et al., 1973
- S. parenteletiformis Huang, 1933
- S. resupinata Martin, 1809
- S. rhomboidalis Huang, 1933
- S. striatula von Schlotheim, 1813
- S. swallovi Weller, 1914
- S. tani Huang, 1933
- S. upensis Sarycheva and Sokolskaja, 1952
- S. verulamensis Cvancara, 1958
- S. vulvaria von Schlotheim, 1820
