= Mesolobus =

Mesolobus Temporal range: Moscovian-Permian ~314–254 Ma

Scientific classification
- Domain: Eukaryota
- Kingdom: Animalia
- Phylum: Brachiopoda
- Class: †Strophomenata
- Order: †Productida
- Family: †Rugosochonetidae
- Subfamily: †Capillomesolobinae
- Genus: †Mesolobus; Dunbar and Condra, 1932

Species
- See text

Extinct genus of brachiopod

Mesolobus is an extinct genus of brachiopod belonging to the order Productida and family Rugosochonetidae.

== Species ==
- M. inflata Liang, 1990
- M. striatus Weller and McGehee, 1933
