= Aspiculuris =

Scientific classification
- Kingdom: Animalia
- Phylum: Nematoda
- Class: Chromadorea
- Order: Rhabditida
- Family: Heteroxynematidae
- Subfamily: Heteroxynematinae
- Genus: Aspiculuris; Schulz, 1927

Genus of roundworms

Aspiculuris is a genus of nematodes belonging to the family Heteroxynematidae.

The species of this genus are found in Mediterranean, Northern America.

Species:

- Aspiculuris ackerti Kruidenier & Mehra, 1959
- Aspiculuris africana Quentin, 1966
- Aspiculuris aserbaidjanica Tarjymanova, 1969
- Aspiculuris dinniki Schulz, 1927
- Aspiculuris indicus Banerjee & Malhotra, 1988
- Aspiculuris kazakstanica Nasarova & Sweschnikowa, 1930
- Aspiculuris lahorica Akhtar, 1955
- Aspiculuris quadrialata (Molin, 1860) Guerrero, 2021
- Aspiculuris schulzi Popov & Nazarova, 1930
- Aspiculuris shikoloueta Inglis, Harris & Lewis, 1990
- Aspiculuris tetraptera (Nitzsch, 1821) Schulz, 1927
- Aspiculuris tschertkovi Tarjimanova, 1969
- Aspiculuris versterae Hugot, 1980
