= Orthoidea =

Scientific classification
- Kingdom: Animalia
- Phylum: Brachiopoda
- Class: Rhynchonellata
- Order: †Orthida
- Suborder: †Orthidina
- Superfamily: †Orthoidea

Superfamily of marine lamp shells

Orthoidea is a superfamily of brachiopods belonging to the order Orthida. Along with the superfamily Plectorthoidea, they constitute the suborder Orthidina - the impunctate group of Orthids. Their fossil record ranges from the Cambrian Series 2 to the Early Devonian, and include the oldest members of the order Orthida as well as the last members of the suborder Orthidina.

== Description ==
As Orthids typically do, Orthoids tend to show strophic outlines with many radial ornamentations(usually costae). Distinguishing between superfamilies usually takes more than external features alone, and internal features such as cardinalia and mantle canals are considered important.

Compared to other Orthid groups, the brachiophores of Orthoids are not supported by basal plates coming from the valve floor. Instead, they project as rods or blades with only their proximal regions connected to the valve. The cardinal process usually assumes a simple, partition-like morphology compared to other groups, which sport more elaborate configurations.

== Taxonomy ==
The superfamily Orthoidea contains these families:

- Family Orthidae
- Family Anomalorthidae
- Family Bohemiellidae
- Family Glyptorthidae
- Family Hesperonomiidae
- Family Hesperorthidae
- Family Lycophoriidae
- Family Nanorthidae
- Family Orthidiellidae
- Family Plaesiomyidae
- Family Poramborthidae
- Family Productorthidae
- Family Whittardiidae
