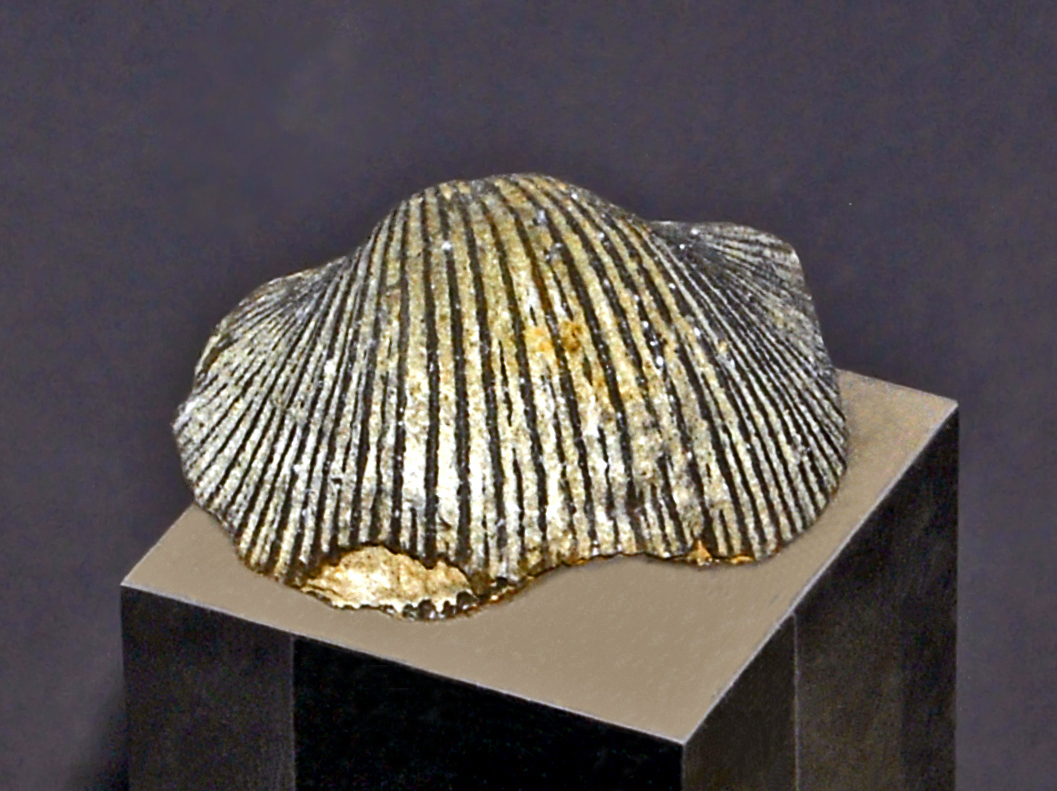
- Fossil specimen of Plaesiomys subquadrata

Scientific classification
- Kingdom: Animalia
- Phylum: Brachiopoda
- Class: Rhynchonellata
- Order: †Orthida
- Family: †Plaesiomyidae
- Genus: †Plaesiomys; Hall and Clarke, 1892

= Plaesiomys =

Plaesiomys Temporal range: Ordovician

Genus of fossil brachiopods

Plaesiomys is a genus of extinct lamp shells belonging to the family Plaesiomyidae.

== Fossil record ==
Fossils of Plaesiomys are found in marine strata of the Ordovician (age range: from 466.0 to 443.7 years ago.) of Canada, China, Europe and United States.

== Species ==
- †Plaesiomys anticostiensis (Shaler, 1865)
- †Plaesiomys bellistriatus Wang, 1949
- †Plaesiomys carletona Twenhofel, 1928
- †Plaesiomys fidelis Popov et al., 2000
- †Plaesiomys iphigenia (Billings, 1865)
- †Plaesiomys multiplicata Bancroft, 1945
- †Plaesiomys porcata (McCoy, 1846)
- †Plaesiomys proavitus Winchell and Schuchert, 1892
- †Plaesiomys rockymontana Wilson, 1926
- †Plaesiomys saxbiana Oraspold, 1959
- †Plaesiomys subquadrata (Hall, 1847)
