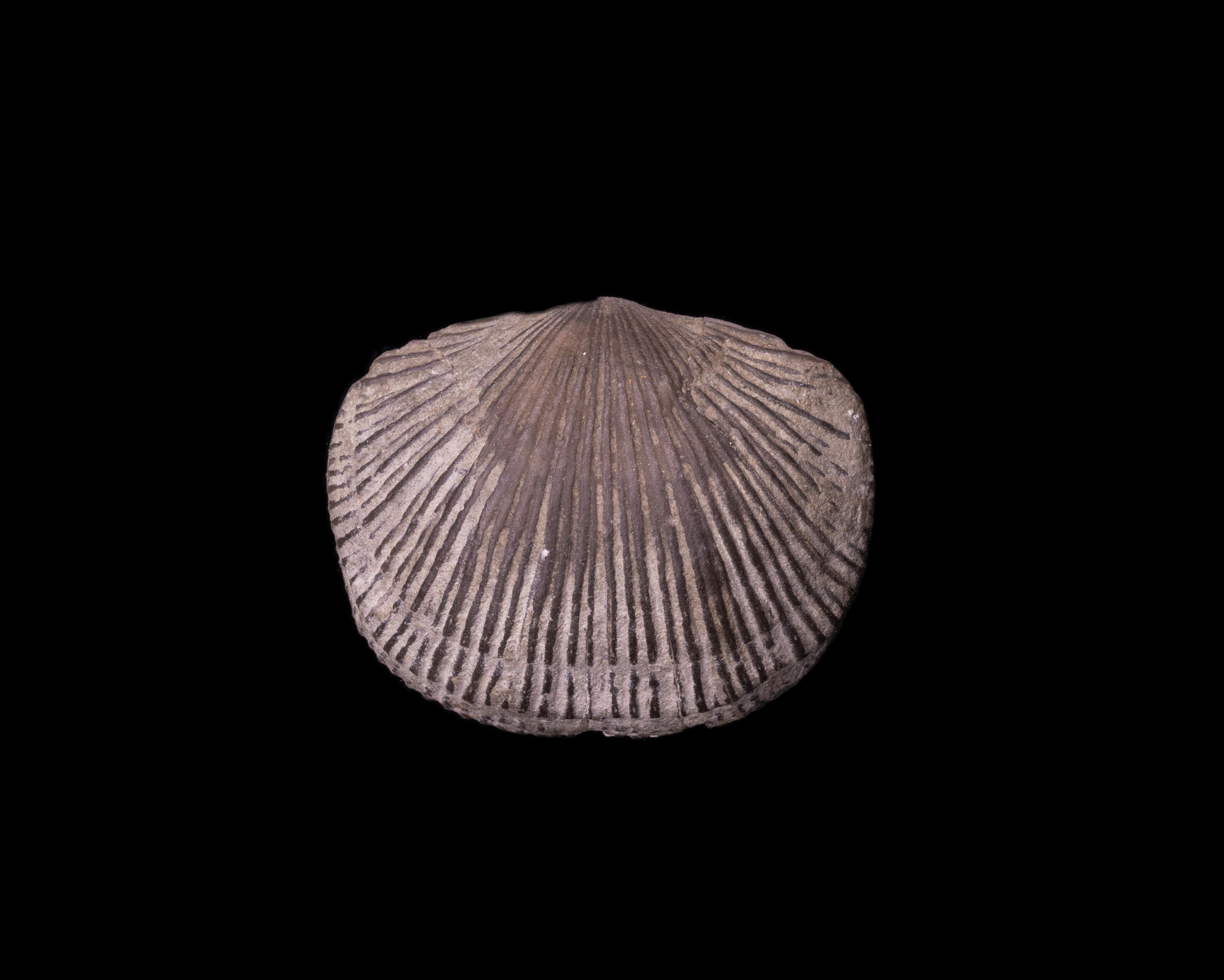
- Dolerorthis rustica from the Silurian period.
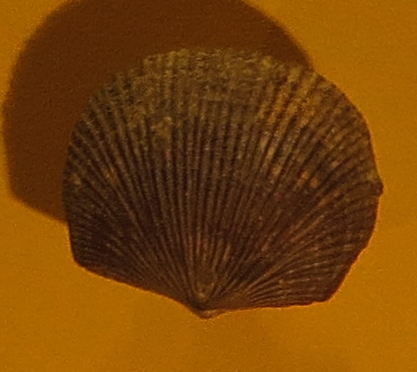
- Dolerorthis sp. fossil

Scientific classification
- Kingdom: Animalia
- Phylum: Brachiopoda
- Class: Rhynchonellata
- Order: †Orthida
- Family: †Hesperorthidae
- Genus: †Dolerorthis; Schuchert & Cooper 1931

Type species
- †Orthis interplicata Foerste, 1909

Species
- †Dolerorthis interplicata (Foerste, 1909)

Synonyms
- Orthis interplicata Foerste, 1909

= Dolerorthis =

Dolerorthis Temporal range: Silurian

Extinct genus of brachiopods

Dolerorthis is an extinct genus of hesperorthid brachiopod. The type species of this genus, D. interplicata, was described from the Silurian (Telychian) Osgood Formation (Indiana, United States). Other species belonging to this genus are known from the Ordovician and Silurian of Europe, Kazakhstan, China and Argentina. It was roughly 4 centimetres (1.6 in) across.
