= Orthis =

Orthis Temporal range: Floian–Darriwilian

Scientific classification
- Kingdom: Animalia
- Phylum: Brachiopoda
- Class: Rhynchonellata
- Order: †Orthida
- Family: †Orthidae
- Genus: †Orthis

Species
- O. callactis Dalman, 1828; O. dehmollaensis Popov et al., 2016

Extinct brachiopod genus

Orthis is an extinct genus of Orthide brachiopod, and is the type genus of the family Orthidae. This genus is known from Lower to Middle Ordovician strata from Sweden, Estonia, western Russia, and Iran.

== Description ==
Orthis is a typical member of Orthidae, and as such possesses two valves (dorsal and ventral) with radial ribbings (costae) on its surface. The costae do not branch into smaller costellae, and number around 13 to 19. Much finer radial linings (capillae) are present. The dorsal valve is noticeably flat, and creates a planoconvex or even concavo-convex lateral profile. Due to the very weak convexity of the dorsal valve, the interarea located at the posterior side is very weakly developed.

On the interior surface of the ventral valve, hinge teeth and short supporting dental plates can be seen. Muscle attachment scars are broad and short. In front of the ventral muscle scars, vascular markings may be preserved. The vascula media of this genus are adjacent and parallel at its base. No median ridge is present on the ventral interior. On the dorsal valve interior, the cardinalia (a series of structures located at the posteromedian part of the dorsal valve inner surface) consists of a pair of widely diverging brachiophores and a simple, ridgelike cardinal process between them.

== Species ==
Numerous species had been erected for the genus Orthis, however most of them have been reassigned to different genera such as Orthambonites, Paralenorthis, Hesperorthis, and Dolerorthis. Currently only two species are considered valid: the type species O. callactis, and a second species O. dehmollaensis.

- O. callactis is known from the Lower Ordovician of Eastern Europe, which would have formed the Palaeocontinent Baltica during the Ordovician. It is a large species that may reach 30 mm in length, with widely spaced costae.
- O. dehmollaensis is known from the Darriwilian (Middle Ordovician) of eastern Alborz Mountains, Iran, which may have been a microcontinent near the South China Craton during the Ordovician. This is a smaller species, around 10 mm in length, with costae equal in width to the interspaces (gaps between costae).

== Palaeoecology ==
Orthis, like all other brachiopods, was a sessile filter feeder. It possessed a moderately wide delthyrium, a median gap located at the back end of the ventral valve in some brachiopods. A pedicle would have passed through this gap, attaching the brachiopod to the substrate. In a palaeoecological study by Rasmussen et al., Orthis was included in the Orthambonites species group, consisting of species that used their pedicles for a hard grip at the substrate. This group was seen as adapted to more low-energy environments, perhaps living in deeper waters where tides did not affect them as much.

In the same study, O. callactis was reported to having co-occurring with Siphonotretids and Calyptolepta? sp. in the Saka section (Estonia), with Calyptolepta? sp. in Putilovo Quarry (Russia), and with Calyptolepta? sp. and Glyptambonites? sp. in Lava River Canyon (Russia). These O. callactis associations, named after the dominant species, indicate deeper-water environments with muddy substrates.
