= Mazzaella (conodont) =

Mazzaella Temporal range: Late Triassic, mid-Julian (early Carnian)

Scientific classification
- Kingdom: Animalia
- Phylum: Chordata
- Infraphylum: Agnatha
- Class: †Conodonta
- Order: †Ozarkodinida
- Family: †Gondolellidae
- Genus: †Mazzaella; Kiliç et al. 2015

Type species
- †Mazzaella carnica (Krystyn, 1975)

Other species
- †Mazzaella baloghi (Kovacs, 1977)

Extinct genus of jawless fishes

Mazzaella is an extinct genus of Late Triassic ozarkodinid conodonts in the family Gondolellidae. They are found in mid-Julian sediments of the Tethys Ocean, including strata in Europe (Germany, Hungary, Italy) and Turkey.

The type species of Mazzaella, Mazzaella carnica, was originally designated as Epigondolella carnica Krystyn (1975). It has been used as an index fossil, defining the middle of three Julian conodont biozones according to a 2018 update to Tethyan conodont biostratigraphy. The genus also includes a rarer species, Mazzaella baloghi, originally Metapolygnathus baloghi Kovacs (1977).

Mazzaella appears to be a descendant of Metapolygnathus (Quadralella) auriformis. Relative to Metapolygnathus, Mazzaella has a moderately elongated free blade and strong platform nodes. The platform is broader and the free blade is proportionally longer in M. baloghi, relative to M. carnica. Although its overall shape is similar to Carnepigondolella, the platform of Mazzaella is smaller and not laterally restricted, and there appears to be no direct link between the two genera.

The name is a tribute to Italian paleontologist Michele Mazza.
