= Paralenorthis =

Paralenorthis Temporal range: Ordovician

Scientific classification
- Kingdom: Animalia
- Phylum: Brachiopoda
- Class: Rhynchonellata
- Order: †Orthida
- Family: †Orthidae
- Genus: †Paralenorthis; Havlíček & Branisa, 1980

Type species
- †Paralenorthis immitatrix Havlíček & Branisa, 1980

Species
- P. immitatrix (type); P. orbicularis; P. costata; P. buttsi; P. marshalli; P. semnanensis; P. carlottoi; P. suriensis; P. riojanus; P. alata; P. estenaensis; P. luritjaorum; P. lolae; P. rgaitensis

Extinct genus of brachiopods

Paralenorthis is an extinct genus of orthid brachiopods, found in Ordovician strata all around the world. Many species of Paralenorthis were previously classified as other orthid genera, such as Orthambonites.

== Taxonomic history ==
The genus Paralenorthis was erected by Havliček and Branisa as a name replacing the defunct name Lenorthis Andreeva and Nikiforova, 1955. The type species, P. immitatrix, was found in Middle Ordovician strata of Bolivia. Species previously assigned to Lenorthis were transferred into this genus, including P. alata and P. orbicularis.

A later study revising the taxonomy of multiple species previously assigned to Orthambonites would reassign many previously described species into this genus. Many more records of Paralenorthis would be described since, hailing from all parts of the world such as Iran, Tibet, Australia, Kazakhstan, Peru, and Morocco.

== Morphological description ==
Paralenorthis is a small brachiopod, with length not exceeding 20 milimeters. Its surface is covered with large unbranching radial ribbings (costae) and small radial lineations (capillae). The ventral valve is more convex than the dorsal valve, and a fold-sulcus structure can be found.

The shape of the ventral vascula media distinguishes this genus from similar genera, like Orthambonites and Orthis. In Paralenorthis, the vascula media is proximally divergent, unlike in Orthambonites and Orthis where it is proximally adjacent.
