= Diraphora =

Diraphora Temporal range: Cambrian

Scientific classification
- Kingdom: Animalia
- Phylum: Brachiopoda
- Class: Rhynchonellata
- Order: †Orthida
- Family: †Bohemiellidae
- Genus: †Diraphora; Bell, 1941

Extinct genus of marine lamp shells

Diraphora is an extinct genus of brachiopod that lived in the Cambrian. Its remains have been found in Australia and North America. 664 specimens of Diraphora are known from the Greater Phyllopod bed, where they comprise 1.26% of the community.
