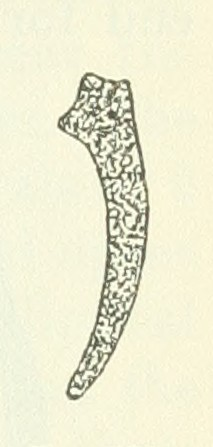
- Dermatoxys veligera, spiculum, 85 micrometer
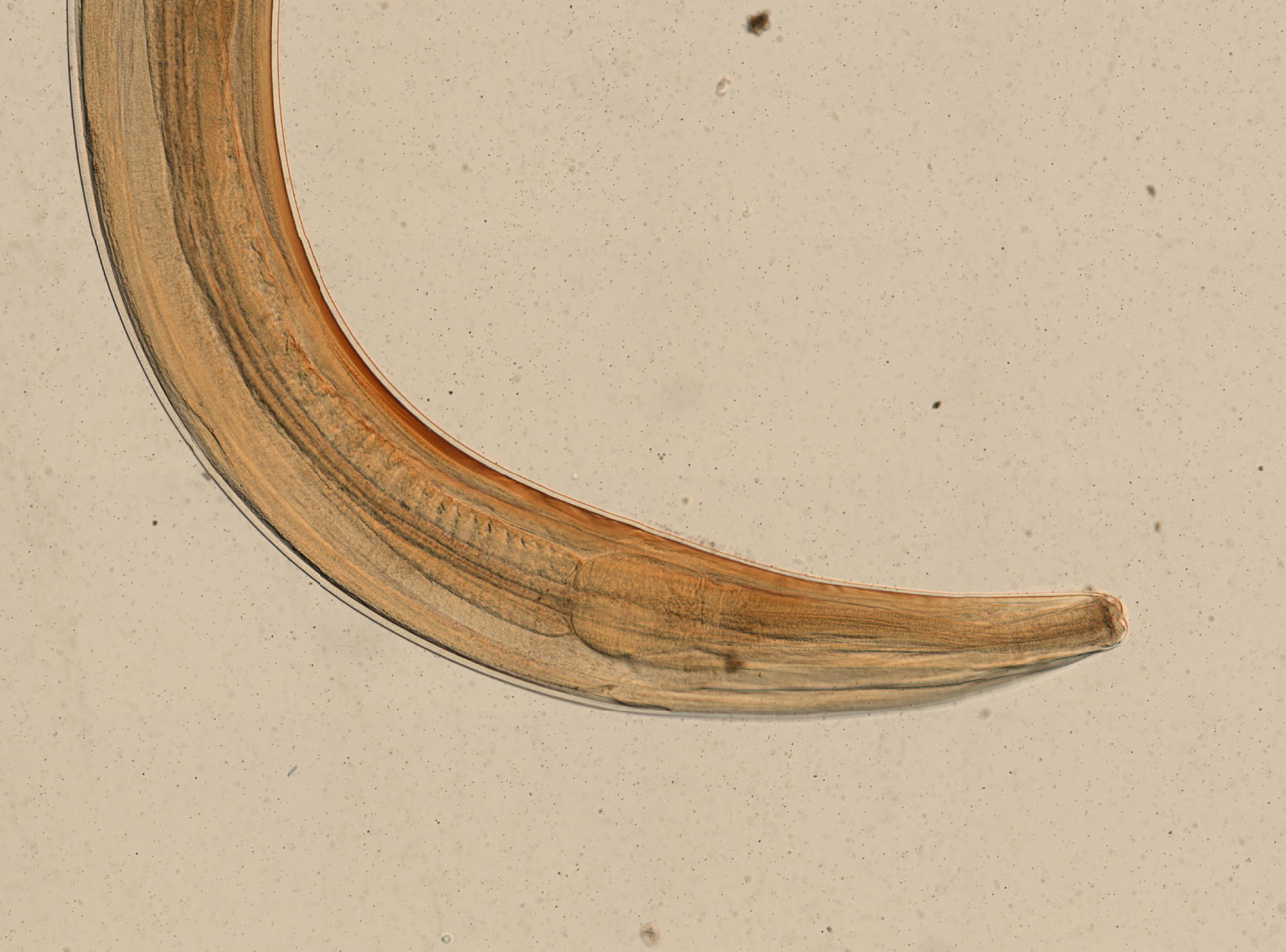
- Dermatoxys veligera

Scientific classification
- Kingdom: Animalia
- Phylum: Nematoda
- Class: Chromadorea
- Order: Rhabditida
- Family: Heteroxynematidae
- Genus: Dermatoxys; Schneider, 1866

= Dermatoxys =

Genus of worms

Dermatoxys is a genus of nematodes belonging to the family Heteroxynematidae.

The species of this genus are found in North America.

Species:

- Dermatoxys hispaniensis Vicente, 1969
- Dermatoxys schumakovitschi (Schulz, 1948)
- Dermatoxys veligera (Rudolphi, 1819)
