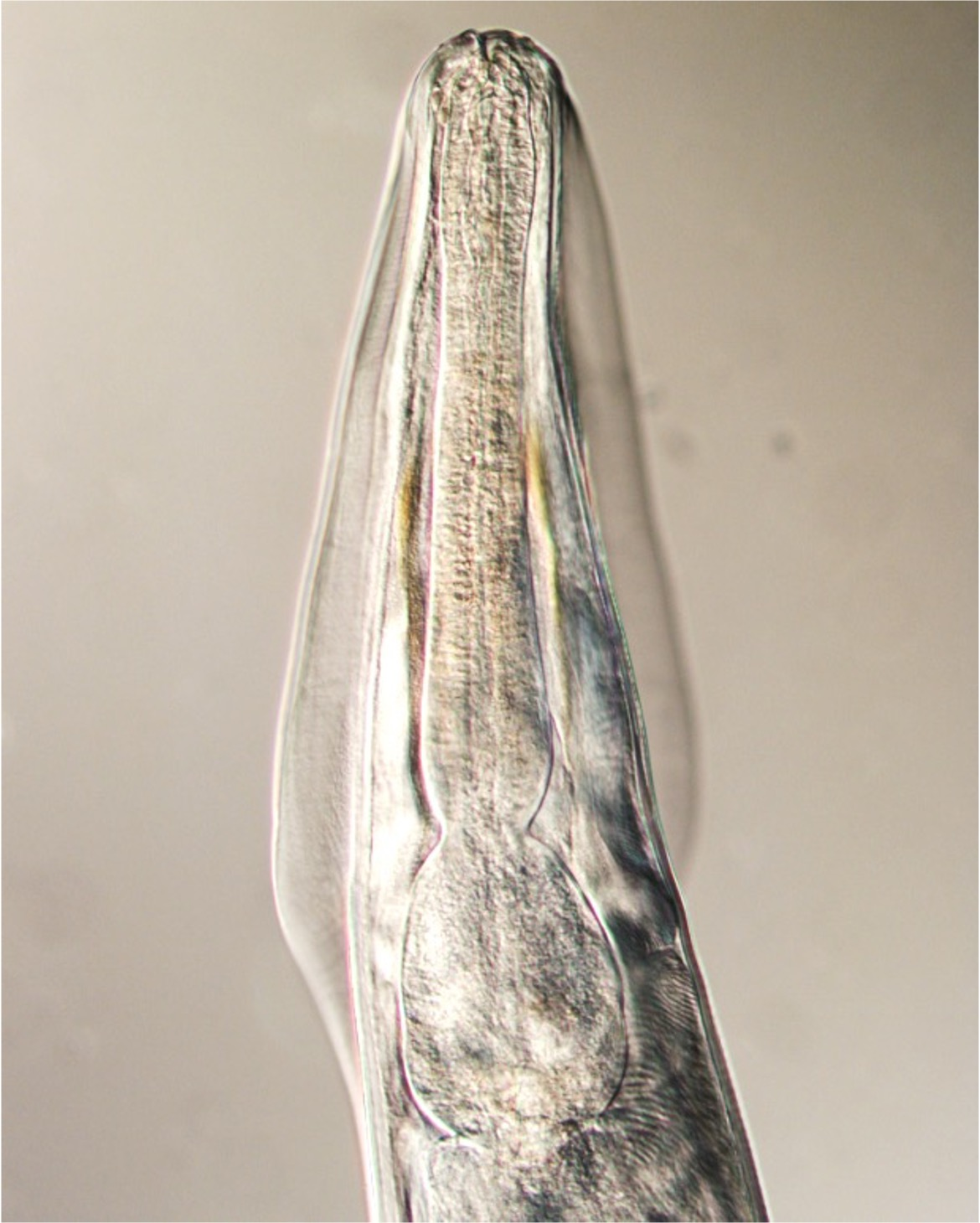
- Heteroxynema cucullatum (anterior position)

Scientific classification
- Kingdom: Animalia
- Phylum: Nematoda
- Class: Chromadorea
- Order: Rhabditida
- Family: Heteroxynematidae
- Genus: Heteroxynema; Hall, 1916

= Heteroxynema =

Genus of nematodes

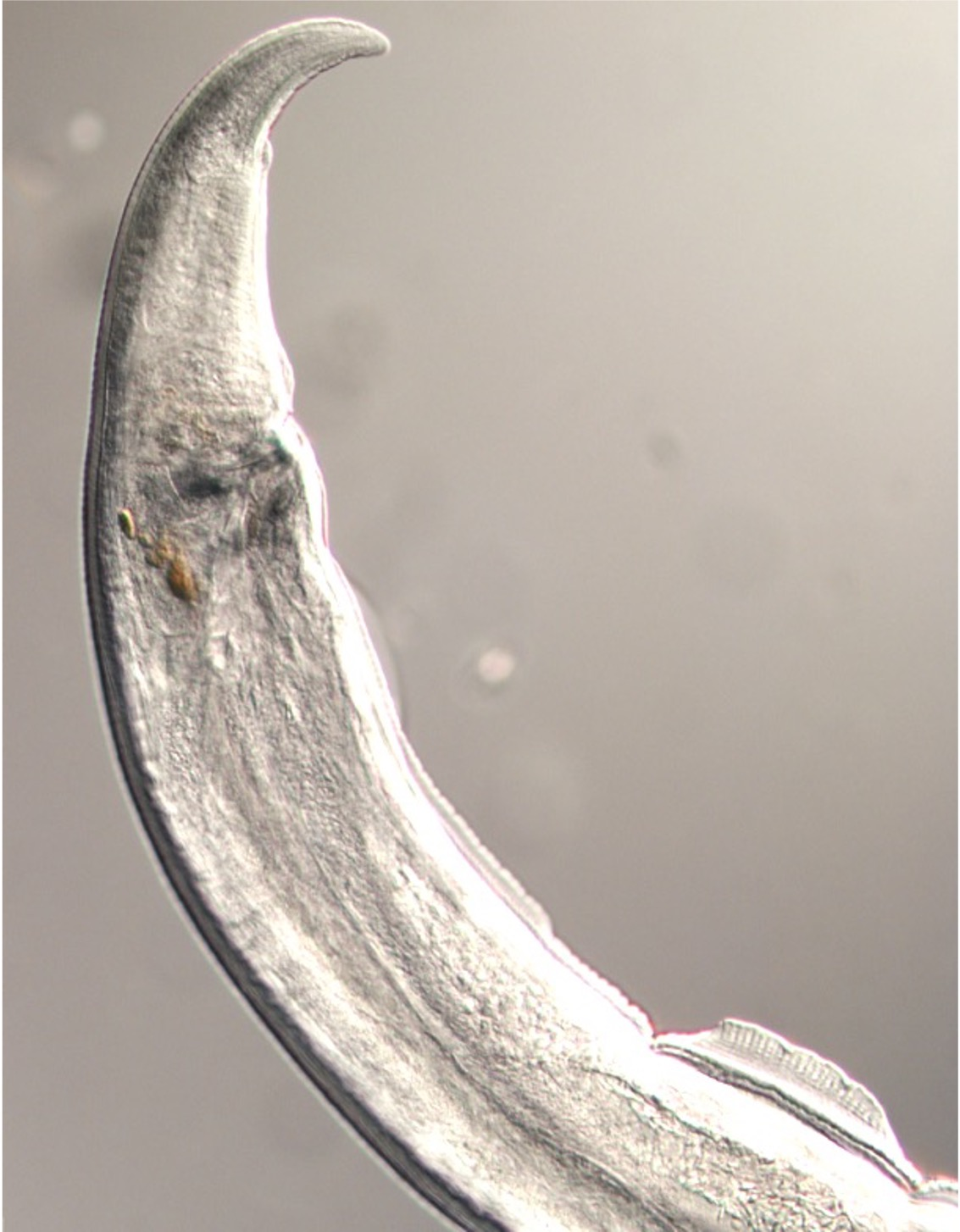
Heteroxynema cucullatum (posterior position)

Heteroxynema is a genus of nematodes found in the family of Heteroxynematidae. This genus evolved within the Myomorpha, Caviomorpha and Sciuromorpha infraorders. Certain parasites of these families Muroidea and Sciuridae came from heteroxynema.

== Distribution ==
Heteroxynema eggs have been found in fossil form in northwestern Patagonia, Argentina, where they could locate specific species. Heteroxynema is also known for parasitizing some nematode species in Oregon, New Mexico, Idaho, Arizona, Utah, Colorado, and three places in Mexico.

== Host associations ==
This genus infects nine different species of squirrels, rodents (chipmunks, prairie dogs, etc.), biomorphs, and caviomorphs.

== Species found ==
- Heteroxynema viscaciae
- Heteroxynema cucullatum
