= Dalmanelloidea =

Scientific classification
- Domain: Eukaryota
- Kingdom: Animalia
- Phylum: Brachiopoda
- Class: Rhynchonellata
- Order: †Orthida
- Suborder: †Dalmanellidina
- Superfamily: †Dalmanelloidea

Superfamily of marine lamp shells

A superfamily of brachiopods containing:

- Family Dalmanellidae
- Family Angusticardiniidae
- Family Dicoelosiidae
- Family Harknessellidae
- Family Heterorthidae
- Family Hypsomyoniidae
- Family Kayserellidae
- Family Mystrophoridae
- Family Paurorthidae
- Family Platyorthidae
- Family Portranellidae
- Family Proschizophoriidae
- Family Rhipidomellidae
- Family Tyronellidae
