= Acuminatella =

Acuminatella Temporal range: Late Triassic (late Carnian to early Norian)

Scientific classification
- Kingdom: Animalia
- Phylum: Chordata
- Infraphylum: Agnatha
- Class: †Conodonta
- Order: †Ozarkodinida
- Family: †Gondolellidae
- Genus: †Acuminatella; Orchard 2013

Type species
- Acuminatella acuminata

Species
- †Acuminatella acuminata; †Acuminatella angusta

Extinct genus of jawless fishes

Acuminatella is a genus of gondolellid conodonts. Fossils have been found in the Pardonet Formation in the Schooler Creek Group in the Western Canadian Sedimentary Basin.
