= Misikella =

Misikella Temporal range: Norian–Hettangian

Scientific classification
- Kingdom: Animalia
- Phylum: Chordata
- Infraphylum: Agnatha
- Class: †Conodonta
- Order: †Ozarkodinida
- Family: †Gondolellidae
- Genus: †Misikella; Kozur and Mock 1974

Species
- †Misikella buseri?; †Misikella hernsteini; †Misikella koessenensis; †Misikella kolarae; †Misikella kovacsi; †Misikella lanceolata; †Misikella longidentata (type)?; †Misikella posthernsteini (type); †Misikella rhaetica; †Misikella ultima

Extinct genus of jawless fishes

Misikella is an extinct genus of conodonts.

Two species were named as type species for the genus in separate publications by the same authors in the same year (1974). The first paper named Misikella longidentata, while the second named Misikella posthernsteini. Most species assigned to Misikella have a Norian-Rhaetian distribution and a bimembrate conodont apparatus, including M. posthernsteini. On the other hand, M. longidentata has a Carnian-Norian distribution and a tetramembrate apparatus. Fåhræus & Ryley (1989) retained the name Misikella for only M. longidentata, placing the rest of the species into the new genus Axiothea. However, other conodont specialists utilize the name Misikella primarily in the context of M. posthernsteini and other bimembrate species, rather than M. longidentata. Uniquely, M. posthernsteini is known from the Hettangian of Japan, suggesting that conodonts underwent extinction debt and then were outcompeted by other organisms.

== Use in stratigraphy ==
The top of the Norian (the base of the Rhaetian, stages of the Upper Triassic) is close to the first appearance of several species of Misikella, as well as Epigondolella mosheri. In 2010, the Norian-Rhaetian boundary was defined by the first appearance of Misikella posthernsteini.

The most often-discussed Rhaetian GSSP Candidate sections are in Steinbergkogel in Austria, or Pignola-Abriola in Italy.
