= Enteletoidea =

Scientific classification
- Domain: Eukaryota
- Kingdom: Animalia
- Phylum: Brachiopoda
- Class: Rhynchonellata
- Order: †Orthida
- Suborder: †Dalmanellidina
- Superfamily: †Enteletoidea; Waagen, 1884

Superfamily of marine lamp shells

Enteletoidea is an extinct superfamily of brachiopods in the order Orthida, containing:

- Family Enteletidae
- Family Draboviidae
- Family Chrustenoporidae
- Family Linoporellidae
- Family Saukrodictyidae
- Family Schizophoriidae
