= Metapolygnathus =

Scientific classification
- Kingdom: Animalia
- Phylum: Chordata
- Infraphylum: Agnatha
- Class: †Conodonta
- Order: †Ozarkodinida
- Family: †Gondolellidae
- Genus: †Metapolygnathus; Hayashi 1968

Species
- †Metapolygnathus" baloghi; †Metapolygnathus communisti; †Metapolygnathus echinatus; †Metapolygnathus polygnathiformis; †Metapolygnathus praecommunisti; †Metapolygnathus primitius

Extinct genus of jawless fishes

Metapolygnathus is an extinct genus of platform conodonts.

== Synonyms ==
Mazzaella is a new genus that also includes Metapolygnathus baloghi Kovacs (1977).

== Use in stratigraphy ==
The top of the Carnian or the base of the Norian stages (Late Triassic) begin at the base of the conodont biozones of Metapolygnathus communisti and Metapolygnathus primitius. A global reference profile for the base (a GSSP) had in 2009 not yet been appointed.
