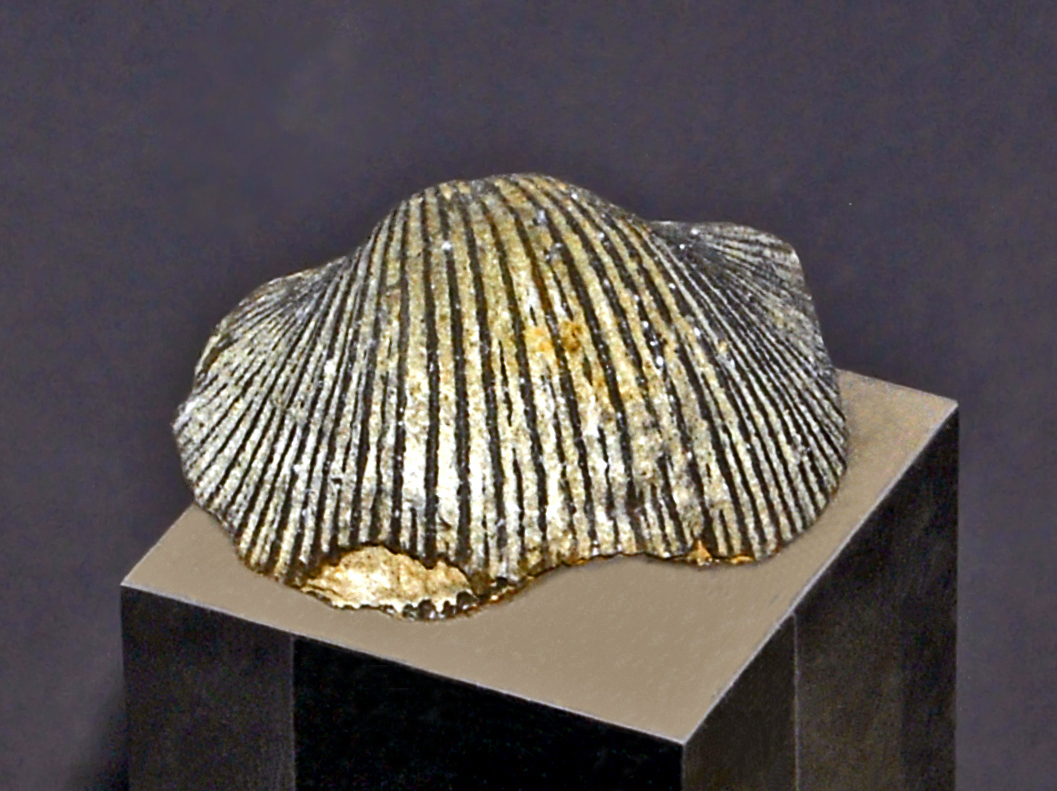
- Fossil specimen of Plaesiomys subquadrata

Scientific classification
- Kingdom: Animalia
- Phylum: Brachiopoda
- Class: Rhynchonellata
- Order: †Orthida
- Superfamily: †Orthoidea
- Family: †Plaesiomyidae; Schuchert, 1913

= Plaesiomyidae =

Plaesiomyidae Temporal range: 478–418 Ma Late Tremadocian-Early Lochkovian

Extinct family of brachiopods

Plaesiomyidae is a family of extinct lamp shells belonging to the order Orthida.

== Fossil record ==
Fossils of Plaesiomyidae are found in marine strata from the Ordovician until the Silurian (age range: from 478.6 to 418.7 years ago.).

== Genera ==
- †Austinella Foerste, 1909
- †Bokotorthis Popov et al., 2000
- †Campylorthis Ulrich and Copper, 1942
- †Chaulistomella
- †Dinorthis Hall and Clarke, 1892
- †Evenkina
- †Madiorthis Zuykov and Harper, 2008
- †Metorthis
- †Multicostella
- †Plaesiomys Hall and Clarke, 1892
- †Retrorsirostra Schuchert and Cooper, 1932
- †Valcourea
