= Pseudoperipatus =

Pseudoperipatus Temporal range: Miaolingian ~508 Ma

Scientific classification
- Kingdom: Animalia
- Phylum: incertae sedis
- Genus: †Pseudoperipatus
- Species: †P. hintelmannae

Binomial name
- †Pseudoperipatus hintelmannae Haug & Haug 2014

Extinct genus of worms

Pseudoperipatus is a monospecific genus of annulated ecdysozoan worm known only from its posterior portion, from a single Burgess Shale specimen. Its rear termination ends in a pair of claw-like structures on 'appendages'.
