= Kraussodontus =

Scientific classification
- Kingdom: Animalia
- Phylum: Chordata
- Infraphylum: Agnatha
- Class: †Conodonta
- Order: †Ozarkodinida
- Family: †Gondolellidae
- Genus: †Kraussodontus; Orchard, 2013

Type species
- †Kraussodontus peteri

Species
- †Kraussodontus peteri

Extinct genus of jawless fishes

Kraussodontus is an extinct genus of gondolellid ozarkodinid conodonts of the Late Triassic (late Carnian) in the Pardonet Formation of Canada.
