= Plectorthoidea =

Scientific classification
- Kingdom: Animalia
- Phylum: Brachiopoda
- Class: Rhynchonellata
- Order: †Orthida
- Suborder: †Orthidina
- Superfamily: †Plectorthoidea; Schuchert & Le Vene, 1929

Superfamily of marine lamp shells

A superfamily of brachiopods containing:

- Family Plectorthidae
- Family Cremnorthidae
- Family Cyclocoeliidae
- Family Eoorthidae
- Family Euorthisinidae
- Family Finkelnburgiidae
- Family Giraldiellidae
- Family Phragmorthidae
- Family Platystrophiidae
- Family Ranorthidae
- Family Rhactorthidae
- Family Tasmanorthidae
- Family Wangyuiidae
