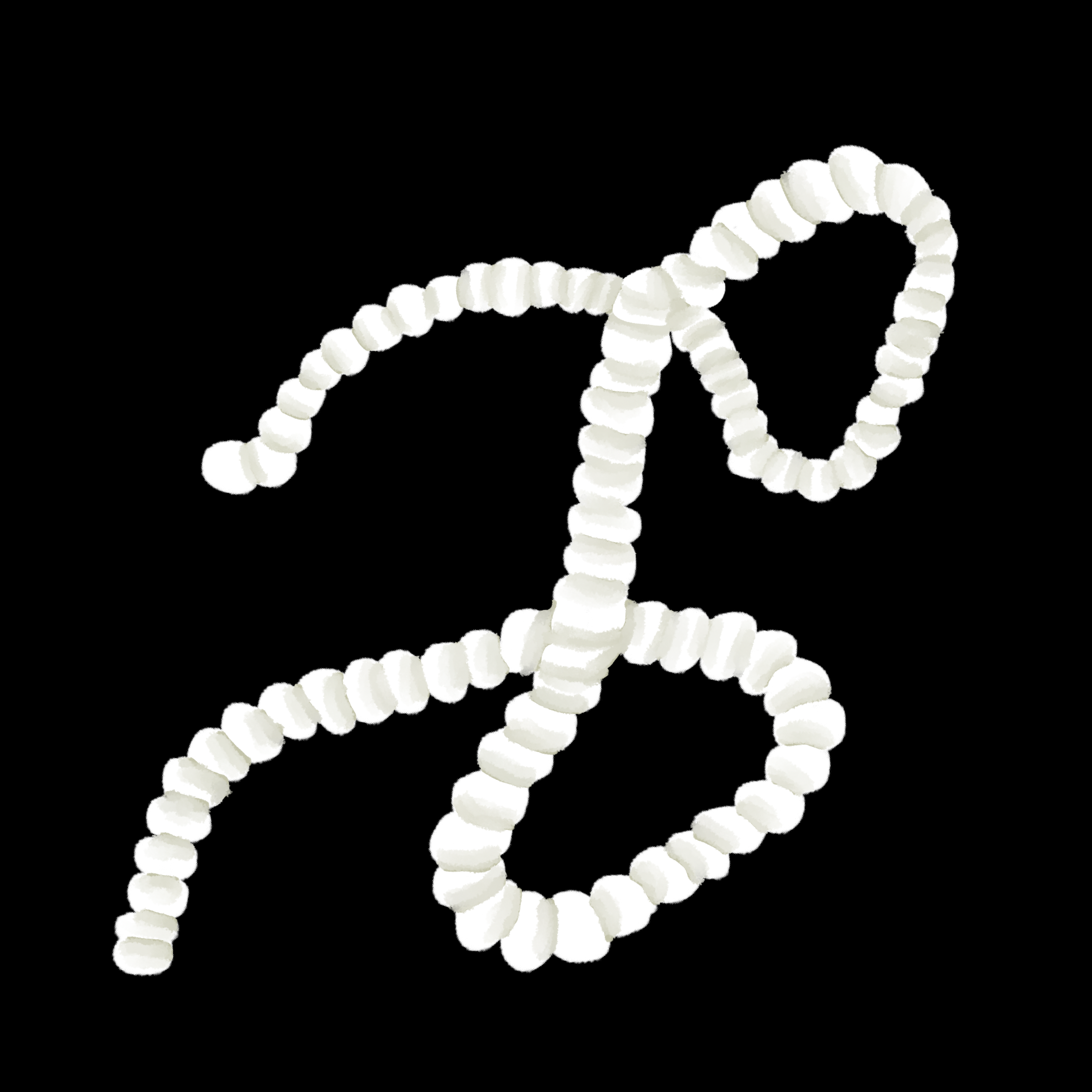
- Artist's interpretation of P. ricei

Scientific classification
- Kingdom: Animalia
- Phylum: incertae sedis
- Genus: †Plexus; Joel, Droser & Gehling, 2014
- Species: †P. ricei

Binomial name
- †Plexus ricei Joel, Droser & Gehling, 2014

= Plexus ricei =

Plexus ricei Temporal range: Ediacaran, ~555 Ma

Extinct worm-like organism from the Ediacarian period

Plexus ricei is an enigmatic fossil animal known from South Australia that has a problematic taxonomy due to its fossils not resembling any other known taxon that is part of the Ediacaran biota.

== Etymology ==
The genus name, Plexus, means "braided" in Latin, a reference to its braided appearance. The specific name, ricei, is a reference to Dennis Rice, one of the field assistants at the South Australian Museum, who helped excavate numerous specimens of the fossil.

== Morphology ==
The fossilized organism is tubular and worm-like, with a body divided into rounded segments, making it look similar to a tapeworm with its long, laterally flattened body. Its body appears to be bilaterally symmetric. The individuals range in size from 5 to 80 centimeters long and 5 to 20 millimeters wide. The organism is composed of a rigid median tubular structure and a fragile outer tubular wall.

== Relations ==
While Plexus ricei appears to be bilaterally symmetric, it is unsure if this organism is a member of Bilateria, although animals that appear to have bilateral symmetry existed at the time. However, Plexus ricei does not resemble any of the other animals from the time period, such as Charnia, Dickinsonia, or Kimberella, bilateral symmetry or not. No other Ediacarian animal has such a long, flattened body, meaning that this organism could belong to an entirely new classification of these extinct animals, or be an ancestor of the complex bilaterians that existed during the Cambrian.
