= Epigondolella =

Epigondolella Temporal range: Late Triassic

Scientific classification
- Kingdom: Animalia
- Phylum: Chordata
- Infraphylum: Agnatha
- Class: †Conodonta
- Order: †Ozarkodinida
- Family: †Gondolellidae
- Genus: †Epigondolella; Mosher, 1968

Species
- †Epigondolella abneptis; †Epigondolella heinzi Mazza, Cau & Rigo 2012; †Epigondolella miettoi Mazza, Cau & Rigo 2012; †Epigondolella mosheri (Kozur and Mostler 1971)

Extinct genus of jawless fishes

Epigondolella is an extinct genus of conodonts in the family Gondolellidae.

== Synonyms ==
Mazzaella is a new genus for Epigondolella carnica Krystyn (1975).

== Use in stratigraphy ==
The top of the Norian (or the base of the Rhaetian, in the Late Triassic) is close to the first appearances of the conodonts Misikella spp. and Epigondolella mosheri.

== Palaeobiology ==
=== Life history ===
The P_{1} element of Epigondolella rigoi exhibited positive growth allometry of the platform area and length with respect to the length of the element. Because the P_{1} elements functioned akin to molars in mammals, this suggests elevated needs for energy as members of the species grew.
