= Rugosochonetidae =

Rugosochonetidae Temporal range: 383.7–251.3 Ma

Scientific classification
- Domain: Eukaryota
- Kingdom: Animalia
- Phylum: Brachiopoda
- Class: †Strophomenata
- Order: †Productida
- Suborder: †Chonetidina
- Superfamily: †Chonetoidea
- Family: †Rugosochonetidae; Muir-Wood, 1962

Type genus
- †Rugosochonetes

Subfamilies
- †Capillomesolobinae; †Delepineinae; †Lamellosiinae; †Plicochonetinae; †Quinquenellinae; †Riosanetinae; †Rugosochonetinae; †Striochonetinae; †Svalbardiinae; †Undulellinae

Extinct family of brachiopods

Rugosochonetidae is an extinct family of brachiopods in the extinct order Productida.
