= Carnepigondolella =

Carnepigondolella Temporal range: Carnian–Norian

Scientific classification
- Kingdom: Animalia
- Phylum: Chordata
- Infraphylum: Agnatha
- Class: †Conodonta
- Order: †Ozarkodinida
- Family: †Gondolellidae
- Genus: †Carnepigondolella; Kozur, 2003

Species
- †Carnepigondolella angulata; †Carnepigondolella eozoae; †Carnepigondolella gulloae; †Carnepigondolella medioconstricta; †Carnepigondolella samueli; †Carnepigondolella tuvalica; †Carnepigondolella zoae

Extinct genus of jawless fishes

Carnepigondolella is an extinct genus of conodonts of the Late Triassic of Italy or Canada.
