= Orthidae =

Orthidae Temporal range: Early Ordovician–Early Devonian

Scientific classification
- Kingdom: Animalia
- Phylum: Brachiopoda
- Class: Rhynchonellata
- Order: †Orthida
- Suborder: †Orthidina
- Superfamily: †Orthoidea
- Family: †Orthidae; Woodward, 1852

Genera
- See text

Family of brachiopods

The Orthidae are a family of brachiopods that belong in the order Orthida. They range from the Early Ordovician to the Early Devonian. This family includes the genus Orthis, which is the namesake of this family, as well as the order Orthida.

== Morphology ==
Members of the family Orthidae show features typical of the superfamily Orthoidea, including: a strophic hinge, open delthyrium and notothyrium, simple and ridgelike cardinal process, quadripartite adductor scars on dorsal interior, and lacking fulcral plates.

Orthids commonly possess ventribiconvex shells, in which the ventral valve is more inflated than its dorsal counterpart. The surfaces of their shells are ornamented with costae(large radial ribbings), which usually occur with costellae(smaller radial ribbings in between costae). A low and broad median ridge is present on the dorsal inner surface, which bisects the quadripartite adductor muscle scars. On the posterior end of their dorsal valves, a pair of brachiophores and a single median cardinal process is present, which is shaped like a ridge and sport an undifferentiated, simple morphology.

== Fossil record ==
Originated in the Early Ordovician, the Orthids sported high diversity throughout the Ordovician period. In the Early Silurian, their abundance noticeably dropped, but they slowly recovered until their demise at the end of the Lochkovian of the Early Devonian.

Orthids are known from many regions, including North America, Russia, China, Europe, Australia, and South America. Some genera, such as Paralenorthis, show cosmopolitan distribution.

== Genera ==
The family consists of the following genera:

* Almadenorthis
- Celsiorthis
- Diochthofera
- Gutiorthis
- Leoniorthis
- Orthambonites
- Orthis
- Orthokopis
- Orthostrophella
- Orthostrophia
- Paralenorthis
- Rogorthis
- Sinorthis
- Sivorthis
- Sulcatorthis
- Sulevorthis
- Suriorthis
- Taphrorthis
- Trondorthis
