= Heteroxynematidae =

Scientific classification
- Kingdom: Animalia
- Phylum: Nematoda
- Class: Chromadorea
- Order: Rhabditida
- Family: Heteroxynematidae

Family of worms

Heteroxynematidae is a family of nematodes belonging to the order Rhabditida.

== Genera ==
Genera:

- Cephaluris Akhtar, 1947
- Dentostomella Schulz & Krepkogorskaja, 1932
- Dermatopallarya Skrjabin, 1924
- Dermatoxys Schneider, 1866
- Eudromoxyura Anderson & Prestwood, 1972
- Fastigiuris Babaev, 1966
- Heteroxynema Hall, 1916
- Ivaschkinonema Erkulov, 1975
- Kahmannia Mas-Coma & Esteban, 1982
- Labiostomum Akhtar, 1941
- Lamotheoxyuris Falcón-Ordaz, Fernández & García-Prieto, 2010
- Paleoxyuris Hugot, Gardner, Borba, Araujo, Leles, Da-Rosa, Dutra, Ferreira & Araújo, 2014
- Rauschoxyuris Quentin, 1975
- Syphaciella Monnig, 1924
