= Gondolellidae =

Gondolellidae Temporal range: Moscovian–Rhaetian

Scientific classification
- Kingdom: Animalia
- Phylum: Chordata
- Infraphylum: Agnatha
- Class: †Conodonta
- Order: †Ozarkodinida
- Family: †Gondolellidae; Lindström, 1970

Genera
- †Acuminatella; †Carnepigondolella; †Clarkina; †Epigondolella; †Gondolella; †Hayashiella; †Icriospathodus; †Jinogondolella; †Kraussodontus; †Mazzaella; †Mesogondolella; †Metapolygnathus; †Neogondolella; †Neospathodus; †Parapetella; †Primatella; †Quadralella

Extinct family of jawless fishes

Gondolellidae is an extinct family of conodonts in the order Ozarkodinida. There are three subfamilies: Mullerinae, Neogondolellinae and Novispathodinae.
