= Norian =

Second age of the late Triassic

- 227.3 – 205.7 Ma
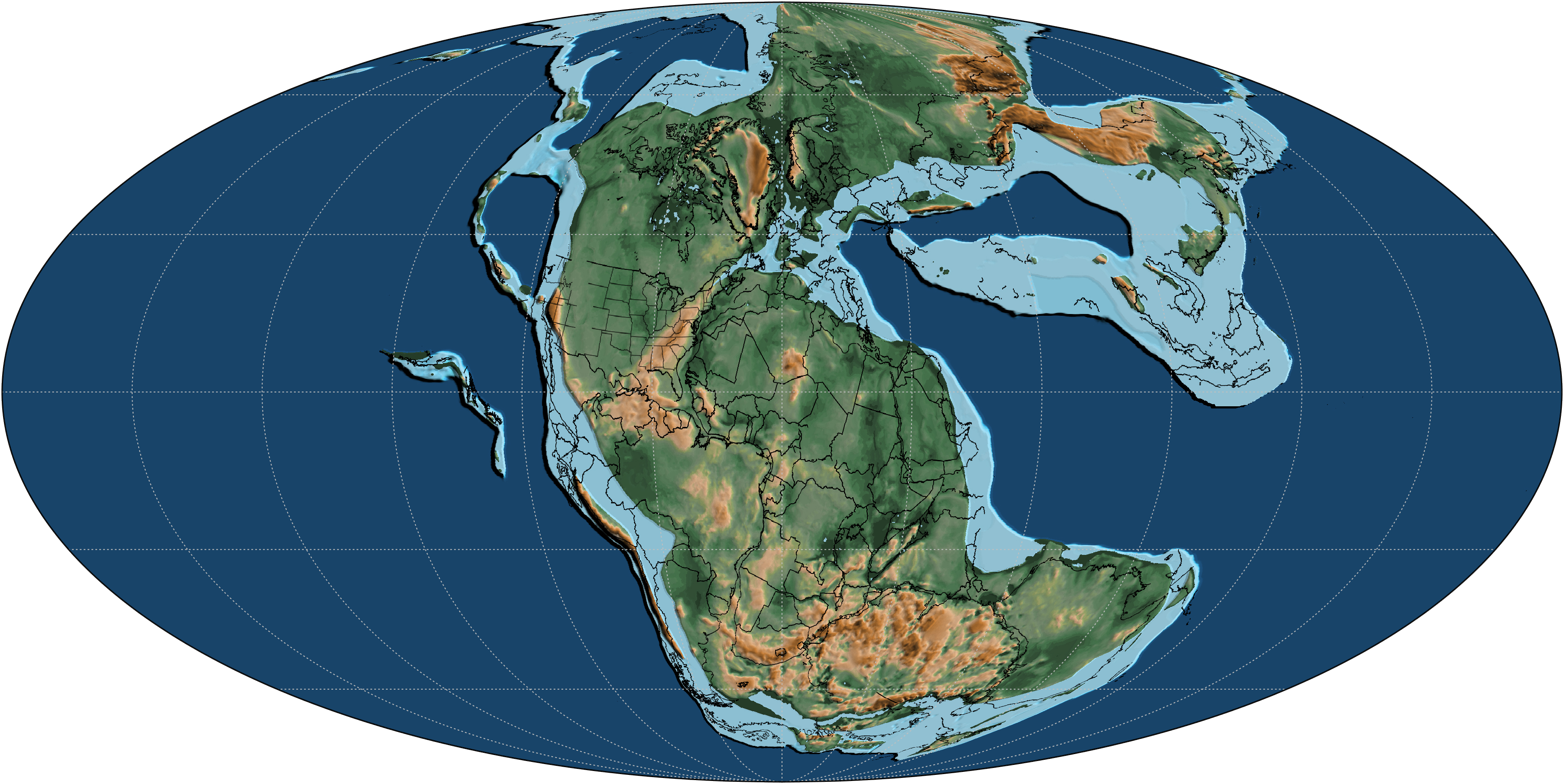
- A map of Earth as it appeared 220 million years ago

Chronology
← / Triassic–Jurassic extinction event; ← / Scleractinian corals & calcified sponges; ← / Carnian pluvial episode; ← / Manicouagan impact; ← / Coals return; ← / Full recovery of woody trees; ← / Smithian–Spathian boundary event; ← / Permian-Triassic extinction event
Subdivision of the Triassic according to the ICS, as of 2024. Vertical axis scale: Millions of years ago

Etymology
- Name formality: Formal

Usage information
- Celestial body: Earth
- Regional usage: Global (ICS)
- Time scale(s) used: ICS Time Scale

Definition
- Chronological unit: Age
- Stratigraphic unit: Stage
- Time span formality: Formal
- Lower boundary definition: Not formally defined
- Lower boundary definition candidates: Base of Stikinoceras kerri ammonoid zone and near FAD of Metapolygnathus echinatus within the M. communisti Conodont zones
- Lower boundary GSSP candidate section(s): Black Bear Ridge, British Columbia, Canada; Pizzo Mondello, Sicily, Italy
- Upper boundary definition: Not formally defined
- Upper boundary definition candidates: FAD of the Conodont Misikella posthernsteini; Near FAD of the Ammonite genus Cochloceras; Near FAD of the Conodont Epigondolella mosheri; Near FAD of the Radiolarian Proparvicingula moniliformis
- Upper boundary GSSP candidate section(s): Steinbergkogel, Austria; Pignola-Abriola, Italy; Turkey; British Columbia, Canada

The Norian is a division of the Triassic Period. It has the rank of an age (geochronology) or stage (chronostratigraphy). It lasted from 227.3 to 205.7 million years ago. It was preceded by the Carnian and succeeded by the Rhaetian.

== Stratigraphic definitions ==
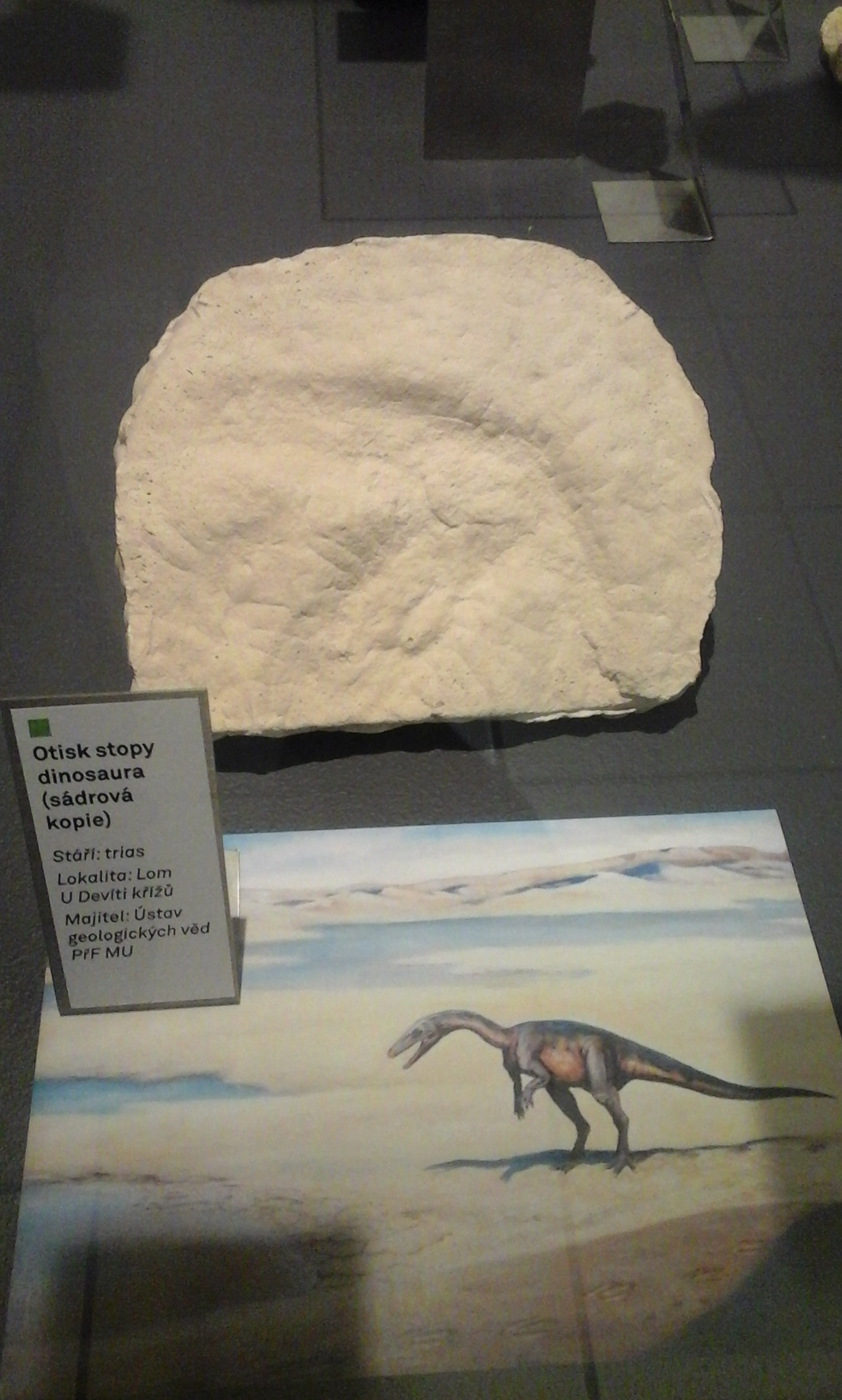
Cast of a tridactyl footprint of a theropod dinosaur from the Norian of the Czech Republic

The Norian was named after the Noric Alps in Austria. The stage was introduced into scientific literature by Austrian geologist Edmund Mojsisovics von Mojsvar in 1869.

The Norian Stage begins at the base of the ammonite biozones of Klamathites macrolobatus and Stikinoceras kerri, and at the base of the conodont biozones of Metapolygnathus communisti and Metapolygnathus primitius. A global reference profile for the base (a GSSP) had in 2009 not yet been appointed.

The top of the Norian (the base of the Rhaetian) is at the first appearance of ammonite species Cochloceras amoenum. The base of the Rheatian is also close to the first appearance of conodont species Misikella spp. and Epigondolella mosheri and the radiolarid species Proparvicingula moniliformis.

In the Tethys domain, the Norian Stage contains six ammonite biozones:

- zone of Halorites macer
- zone of Himavatites hogarti
- zone of Cyrtopleurites bicrenatus
- zone of Juvavites magnus
- zone of Malayites paulckei
- zone of Guembelites jandianus

=== Subages ===
The Norian is divided into three global subages or substages:

- Lacian (lower Norian)
- Alaunian (middle Norian)
- Sevatian (upper Norian)

Many older studies considered the Rhaetian to be the uppermost substage of the Norian, though it has subsequently been raised to its own stage.

The Revueltian land-vertebrate faunachron (LVF) corresponds to part of the Norian (215–207 Ma), and it is probable that the Otischalkian and Adamanian LVFs (227–215 Ma) are also early-middle Norian in age.

== Notable formations ==
- Calcare di Zorzino (Italy)
- Caturrita Formation (Rio Grande do Sul, Brazil)
- Chinle Formation (Arizona and New Mexico, USA)
- Cow Branch Formation (North Carolina and Virginia, USA)
- Dockum Group (Carnian – Norian) (Texas and New Mexico, USA)
- Dolomia di Forni (Italy)
- Ischigualasto Formation (Carnian – Norian) (Argentina)
- Los Colorados Formation (Argentina)
- Stubensandstein (Germany)
- Trossingen Formation (Norian – Rhaetian) (Switzerland and Germany)
