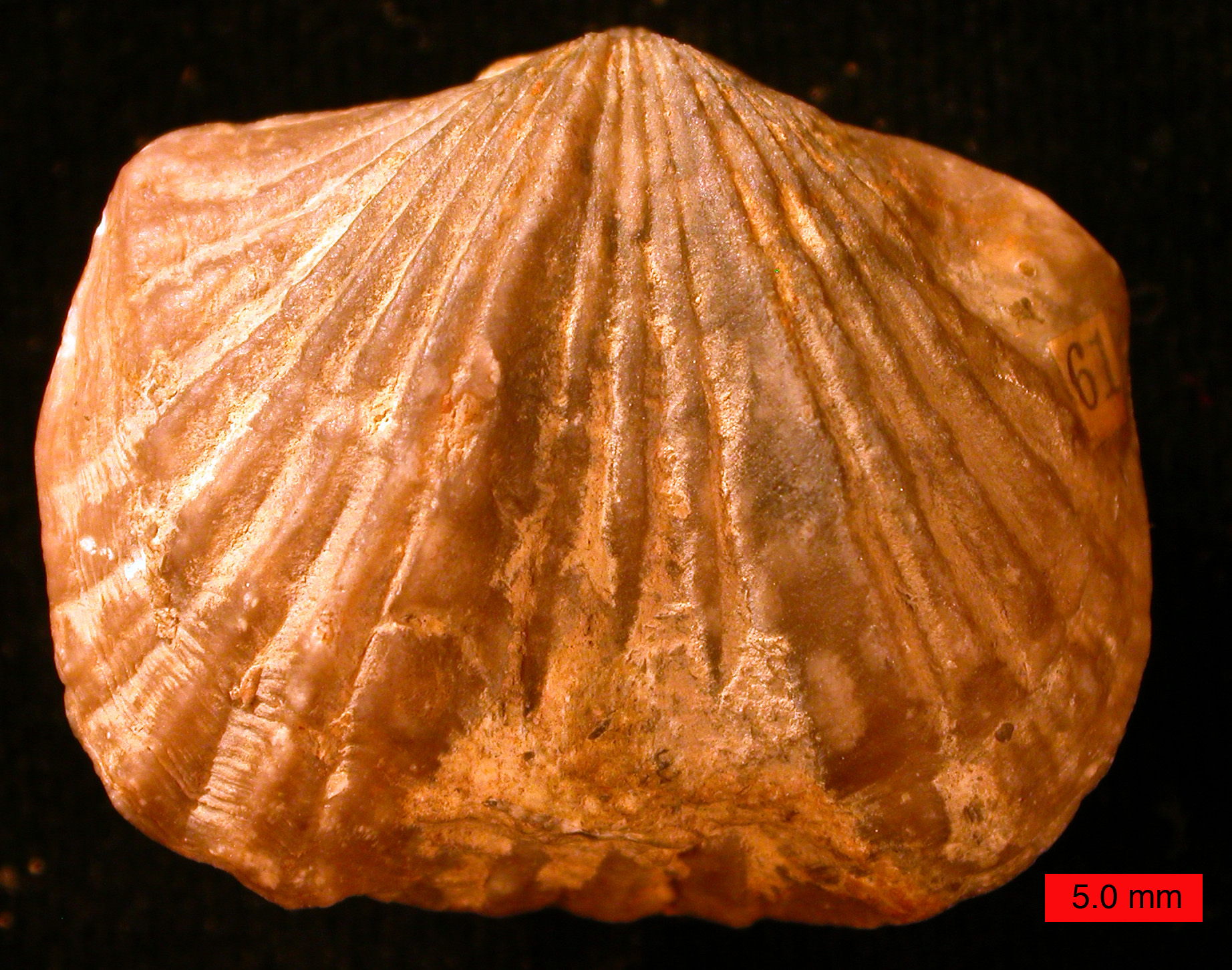
- Vinlandostrophia ponderosa (Upper Ordovician).

Scientific classification
- Kingdom: Animalia
- Phylum: Brachiopoda
- Class: Rhynchonellata
- Order: †Orthida

Suborders and Superfamilies
- Orthidina; Orthoidea; Plectorthoidea; Dalmanellidina; Dalmanelloidea; Enteletoidea

= Orthida =

Orthida Temporal range: Early Cambrian (Botomian)–Permian

Extinct order of brachiopods

Orthida is an extinct order of brachiopods which appeared during the Early Cambrian period and became very diverse by the Ordovician, living in shallow-shelf seas. Orthids are the oldest member of the subphylum Rhynchonelliformea (Articulate Brachiopods), and is the order from which all other brachiopods of this group stem.

== Description ==
=== Hardpart morphology ===
Orthids typically possess biconvex, radially ornamented valves that join into a strophic(straight) hinge. The ventral(pedicle) valve is often taller than the dorsal(brachial) valve, which is relatively flat. Thus, the interarea is also taller on the ventral valve. However, there are exceptions, such as the family Anomalorthidae with taller dorsal valves. Radial ornamentation typically occur as costae and/or costellae, which often appear as grooves on the interior surface as well as the exterior. A single median sulcus on the dorsal valve may be present.

Orthids are articulate brachiopods, meaning they have hinges with teeth and sockets. Their teeth are mostly deltidiodont, meaning the teeth and sockets do not completely interlock. A pair of rod or blade-like brachiophores are present on the dorsal interior, which may have aided in supporting lophophores. Also on the dorsal interior is a cardinal process, a projection located in the median posterior end. Members of Orthoidea tend to have a simple cardinal process shaped like a single rod, while in other taxa more derived types are seen, including bilobed and trilobed forms. Diductor muscle scars are often found on the cardinal process, which implies that it aided in the opening of the valves. The diductor muscles, projecting through the posterior opening known as the delthyrium, would have used the cardinal process as a sort of lever when lifting the dorsal valve.

=== Softpart anatomy ===
Soft tissue of Orthids can be indirectly inferred from muscle scars and pallial markings on the internal surfaces of their shells. Muscle scars are present on the posterior of the ventral valve as well as the median to posterior of the dorsal valve. The ventral muscle scars tend to assume an oval or slightly triangular shape, and consist of the adductor scars in the middle and diductor scars on the sides. At the posterior end of the muscle attachments, a pedicle callist can be found, which is thought to be where the basal cuticle of the pedicle attached. The dorsal muscle scars are often quadripartite, and may lie bilaterally separated by a median ridge.

Direct soft tissue preservation is known in the possible Orthid Bethia serraticulma from the Coalbrookdale Formation. The exceptionally preserved fossil contains crucial information on the setae, lophophores, and pedicles of Orthids. Bethia possessed schizolophe lophophores, in which the pair of arms curve to face the mouth. The pedicle was robust, with rootlets at the end and many ridges on its surface. Such ridges are not known in any recent Rhynchonelliform brachiopods, and has been interpreted as either structures aiding in anchoring to sediment, or structures that hint to an unusual pedicle with an ability to contract.

=== Shell microstructure ===
The microstructure of the Orthid shell can be divided into two types: punctate and impunctate. Punctate microstructure refer to a state that contain punctae, which are perforations within the shell layers. On the other hand, impuncate microstructure refers to the absence of such punctae. The existence of punctae is a key feature in dividing the two suborders of Orthida - the impunctate Orthids are classified into the suborder Dalmanellidina, and the punctate Orthids are classified into the suborder Orthidina.

== Evolutionary History ==
There is some debate over the forms that first appeared of this order as to how they should be classified. However, they began to differentiate themselves by the late Early Cambrian period, and by the late Cambrian period had diversified into numerous varieties and reach 2 to 5cm in width. The family Bohemiellidae of the superfamily Orthoidea include some of the oldest Orthids, such as Wimanella and Diraphora.

Specimens from the late Cambrian to the earliest Ordovician exhibit shells with rounded and pointed pedicle valves, with sharp to obtuse extremities and ridges that are fine to course. Punctate Orthids appear during the mid-Ordovician, which establish the suborder Dalmanellidina. Orthids reached their peak diversity during the Ordovician, in which Orthoids and Dalmanelloids were most abundant. The Darriwillian age of the Middle Ordovician was the start of the peak, recording a total of 50 genera. During the Late Ordovician, Orthoids started to decline while the Dalmanelloids and Enteletoids diversified.

Orthid diversity largely suffered during the Late Ordovician mass extinction. After that, the Orthidines never fully recovered, and went extinct by the Early Devonian. Dalmanellidines lived on, and would play a minor role in benthic ecosystems until the late Permian, when they became extinct.

== Palaeoecology ==
Like many Rhynchonellate brachiopods, Orthids were sessile filter feeders, often anchoring themselves onto firm substrates. They were mostly of small size, with some of the largest members reaching widths of 60mm(about 2.3 inches).

Due to their lifestyle, Orthids may be fossilized with their posterior end attached to skeletal material. Such examples date all the way back to some of the earliest members of the order, like Diraphora preserved attaching itself onto a spicule of the sponge Pirania in the Burgess Shale. On the other hand, several epibionts have also been found on the shells of Orthids. The earliest attachment traces of brachiopods, Podichnus conicus from the Tremadocian of Argentina, were found on surfaces on various Orthids. The trace-maker was interpreted as the Orthid Lipanorthis santalaurae, which suggests that Orthids would have even anchored themselves on other Orthids. It is notable that L. santalaurae mostly anchored on shells of the same species, possibly aiding their survival in fine-grained sediment, as well as promoting early fecundation of gametes.

The pedicle of a typical Orthid would have emerged from its delthyrium, alongside the diductor muscles. Their delthyria and notothyria, median gaps located in the center of ventral and dorsal valves respectively, were usually wide open in Orthids. Various degrees of cover in the posterior gaps are known from groups such as Hesperorthidae and Paurorthidae. Productorthis is interpreted as having a reduced pedicle, adopting a free-lying and semi-infaunal lifestyle.

The costae that most Orthids sport tend to make their commissures assume a crenulated or wavy shape. This is taken to the extreme with some genera like Platystrophia, with their exaggerated 'zig-zag slits'. This feature, evolved separately in multiple lineages of brachiopods, is thought to be a protective adaptation; a way to achieve the same amount of water intake as a normal gape, without the dangers of letting big particles inside.

The punctae of most Orthids are contained within the shell, and are dubbed endopunctae. However, in some Orthids the perforations may extend to the outer surface of the shell, creating miniature 'pits'. Such pits are variable in shapes and sizes, and may have had different functions depending on the morphology. Most of them suggest a sensory function, via housing setae and bristles. The ones in Linoporella are shallow and wide, and may have helped deter epibionts. Saukrodictya had very impressive pits that were big and polygonal, making the shell resemble a mesh or a net. Its perforations are hypothesized to house cells that may have deterred various borers and predators by secreting toxic chemicals.

== Taxonomy ==
The following taxonomy of Orthids is based on the revised Treatise, unless noted otherwise.

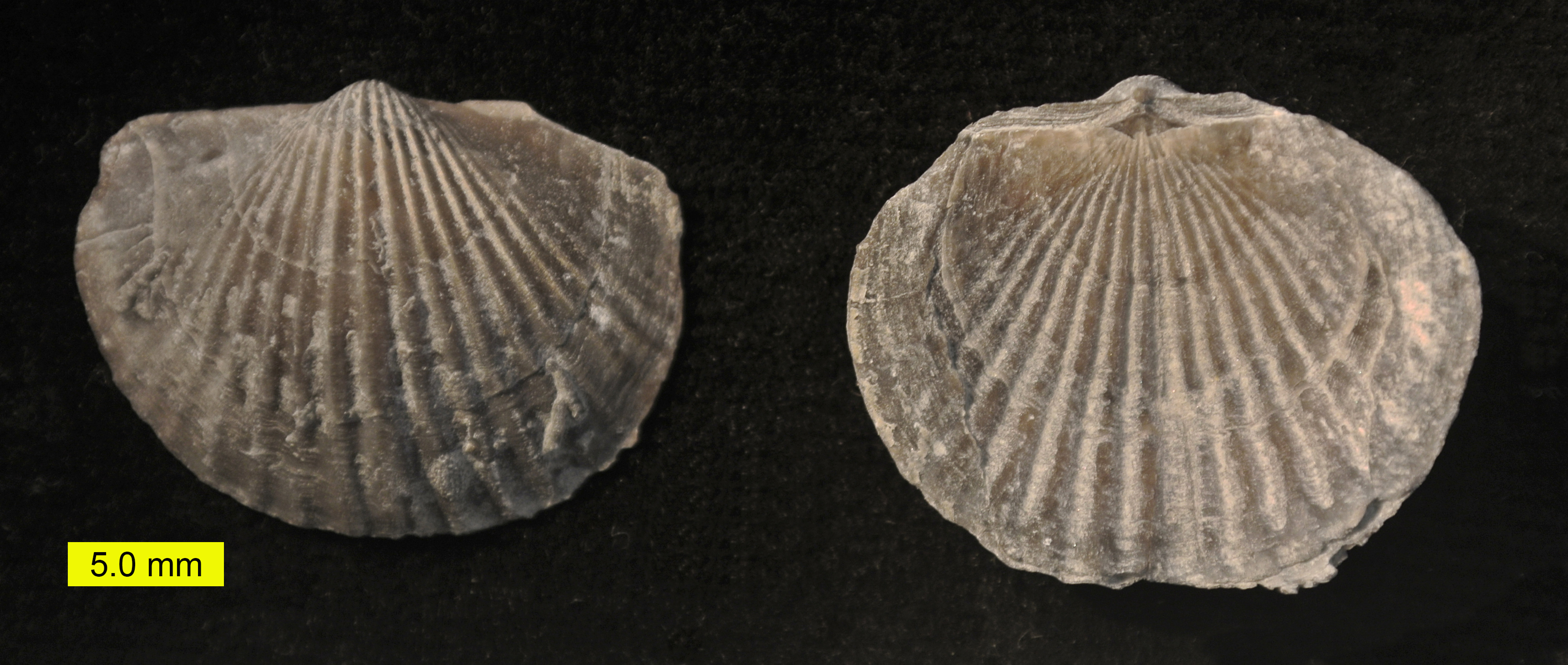
Tropidoleptus carinatus, an orthid brachiopod from the Middle Devonian of New York.

=== Suborder Orthidina ===
- Superfamily Orthoidea
  - Family Orthidae
  - Family Anomalorthidae
  - Family Bohemiellidae
  - Family Glyptorthidae
  - Family Hesperonomiidae
  - Family Hesperorthidae
  - ?Family Lycophoriidae - disputed, may not belong to Orthida at all.
  - Family Archaeorthidae
  - Family Orthidiellidae
  - Family Plaesiomyidae
  - Family Poramborthidae
  - Family Productorthidae
  - Family Whittardiidae
  - Family Pupiaoiidae
  - Family Tarfayidae
- Superfamily Plectorthoidea
  - Family Plectorthidae
  - Family Cremnorthidae
  - Family Cyclocoeliidae
  - Family Eoorthidae
  - Family Euorthisinidae
  - Family Finkelnburgiidae
  - Family Giraldiellidae
  - Family Phragmorthidae
  - Family Platystrophiidae
  - Family Ranorthidae
  - Family Rhactorthidae
  - Family Tasmanorthidae
  - Family Wangyuiidae

=== Suborder Dalmanellidina ===
- Superfamily Dalmanelloidea
  - Family Dalmanellidae
  - Family Angusticardiniidae
  - Family Dicoelosiidae
  - Family Harknessellidae
  - Family Heterorthidae
  - Family Hypsomyoniidae
  - Family Kayserellidae
  - Family Mystrophoridae
  - Family Paurorthidae
  - Family Platyorthidae
  - Family Portranellidae
  - Family Proschizophoriidae
  - Family Rhipidomellidae
  - Family Tyronellidae
- Superfamily Enteletoidea
  - Family Enteletidae
  - Family Draboviidae
  - Family Chrustenoporidae
  - Family Linoporellidae
  - Family Saukrodictyidae
  - Family Schizophoriidae
