= List of fossiliferous stratigraphic units in Svalbard =

Group or formation	Period	Notes
Assistance Formation	Permian	
Dracoisen Formation	Ediacaran	
Frankelryggen Formation	Silurian	
Kirtonryggen Formation	Ordovician	
Tokammane Formation	Cambrian	
Treskelodden Beds Formation	Permian	
Twillingodden Formation	Triassic	
Upper Saurian Niveau Formation	Triassic	
Valhallfonna Formation	Ordovician	
Vardebukta Formation	Triassic	
Vikinghøgda Formation	Triassic	
Wide Bay Formation	Devonian	
Wide Bay Series Formation	Devonian	
Wilhelmøya Formation	Triassic	
Wood Bay Formation	Devonian	
Wood Bay Series Formation	Devonian	
Wordiekammen Limestone	Carboniferous	
