= Vikinghøgda Formation =

Geologic formation in Svalbard, Norway

- Stratigraphic range: Induan-Olenekian (Griesbachian-Spathian); ~252–247.2 Ma
- Type: Formation
- Unit of: Sassendalen Group
- Sub-units: Deltadalen Member, Lusitaniadalen Member, Vendomdalen Member
- Underlies: Botneheia Formation
- Overlies: Kapp Starostin Formation

Lithology
- Primary: Mudstone, siltstone
- Other: Shale, sandstone

Location
- Approximate paleocoordinates: 42.2°N 10.4°E
- Region: Svalbard
- Country: Norway
- Vikinghøgda Formation (Svalbard)

The Vikinghøgda Formation is a geologic formation in Svalbard, Norway. It preserves fossils dating back to the Early Triassic (Griesbachian-Spathian) period. It is split into three members, from oldest to youngest: the Deltadalen Member (Induan), Lusitaniadalen Member (Smithian), and Vendomdalen Member (Spathian). The formation can be found in central Spitsbergen (Sassendalen, Dickson Land, James I Land), southern Spitsbergen, as well as the smaller islands of Barentsøya and Edgeøya. The type locality is positioned in the vicinity of Vikinghøgda and Sticky Keep, two low peaks along the southeast edge of Sassendalen (Sassen Valley) in Spitsbergen. The two upper members of the Vikinghøgda Formation were previously grouped together as the Sticky Keep Formation.

== Subunits ==
The Vikinghøgda Formation is formed by fine-grained marine sediments, such as mudstones, shales, siltstones, and fine sandstones. There is a trend of finer sediments, deeper waters, and higher organic content through the formation. Though fossils are only abundant in the middle part (Lusitaniadalen Member) of the formation, index fossils can be found throughout the whole formation. The Vikinghøgda Formation is one of the better records of Early Triassic chronostratigraphy in the Boreal realm, owing to a combination of continuous sedimentation, distinctive index fossils, palynomorph stratigraphy, magnetostratigraphy, and trace metal cyclostratigraphy.

=== Deltadalen Member ===
The Deltadalen Member is named after the small stream valley which runs between Vikinghøgda and Sticky Keep. The member consists of about 70 meters of silty shales and fine sandstones, lying above the eroded surface of the Permian-age Kapp Starostin Formation. Some of the sandstone beds may be glauconitic or hummocky, and calcareous nodules may be present. Fossils are rare and restricted to these nodules, though they include a variety of silicified ammonoids, conodonts, bivalves, and gastropods. Some index fossils have biostratigraphic significance, such as the ammonoid Otoceras boreale and the conodonts Neogondolella carinata and Neospathodus svalbardensis. These species constrain the member to the Induan stage, between the early Griesbachian and early Dienerian substages. The sandiest intervals can be found at the base and the top of the member. The depositional environment is reconstructed as a shallow marine setting influenced by storms and nearby deltaic sediments.

The Deltadalen Member has been equated with two other Induan-age formations in its vicinity: the Vardebukta Formation (exposed in western and southern Spitsbergen) and the Havert Formation (under the Barents Sea).

A 2020 study reported that the Permian-Triassic boundary occurs near the start of the Deltadalen Member. This was supported by several lines of evidence. The conodont Hindeodus parvus, which defines the base of the Triassic, was reported from a sediment layer 4.1 meters above the base of the member. An overlying tephra bed was dated to 252.13 ± 0.62 Ma via U-Pb radiometric dating, an age which is congruent with other reported estimates for the boundary.

=== Lusitaniadalen Member ===
The Lusitaniadalen Member is named after a glacier on the western flank of Vikinghøgda. The member is about 90 meters thick, mostly composed of laminated silty mudstones. Sandstone beds are less common, though when they occur, they are hummocky. Fossiliferous calcareous nodules are abundant in the sandstone-bearing layers, encasing well-preserved fossils of both invertebrates and vertebrates. The ammonoid index fossils Euflemingites romunderi and Wasatchites tardus indicate that the Lusitaniadalen Member was deposited during the Smithian substage of the Olenekian stage. The most common ammonoid is Arctoceras. Fish and amphibian fossils have also been found in this member, particularly at the "Fish Niveau" bonebed. This horizon also produced the oldest known ichthyopterygian reptile fossil. The depositional environment corresponds to a deeper and calmer conditions, indicative of a major transgression (sea level rise) affecting the continental shelf.

The Lusitaniadalen Member has been equated with the Iskletten Member of the Tvillingodden Formation (in western Spitsbergen) and the lower part of the Klappmyss Formation (under the Barents Sea). It has also been previously described as the Iskletten Member of the Sticky Keep Formation.

=== Vendomdalen Member ===
Dark shale (laminated mudstone) dominates the 90-meter-thick Vendomdalen Member, though silty yellowish dolomitic beds also occur. The Vendomdalen Member corresponds to the deepest part of the continental shelf, with high organic matter deposition and no influence from storm events. Very large dolomite nodules or lenses, some over a meter in width, can also be found in this member. However, fossil-bearing concretions are rarer and more deformed than in the Lusitaniadalen Member. Fossils include abundant bivalves and Spathian ammonoid index fossils, such as Bajarunia euomphala, Keyserlingites subrobustus, and Parasibirites elegans.

Marine reptile and fish bonebeds also occur in the Vendomdalen Member, the two most prominent being the older "Grippia Niveau" and younger "Lower Saurian Niveau". The Grippia Niveau is estimated to be around 249 million years old.

The Vendomdalen Member has been equated with the Kaosfjellet Member of the Tvillingodden Formation (in western Spitsbergen) and the upper part of the Klappmyss Formation (under the Barents Sea). It has also been previously described as the Kaosfjellet Member of the Sticky Keep Formation.

== Paleobiota ==
Color key: Taxon / Reclassified taxon / Taxon falsely reported as present / Dubious taxon or junior synonym / Ichnotaxon / Ootaxon / Morphotaxon	Notes; Uncertain or tentative taxa are in small text; ~~crossed out~~ taxa are discredited.

=== Tetrapods ===
Tetrapod remains occur in several horizons of the Vikinghøgda Formation. The fossils belong to ichthyosauriform and possibly sauropterygian reptiles and temnospondyl amphibians.

==== Reptiles ====
Reptiles of the Vikinghøgda Formation
Taxon / Genus	Species	Subunit	Notes	Images
Ammonitritor	A. scientiacivium	Vendomdalen Member (Grippia Niveau)	An omphalosaurid ichthyosauriform	
Archosauromorpha	indet.	Vendomdalen Member (Grippia Niveau)	Vertebrae and an ilium, all similar to semiaquatic archosauromorphs such as Vancleavea, Litorosuchus, and Qianosuchus.	
Cymbospondylus	C. sp.	Vendomdalen Member (Lower Saurian Niveau, Grippia Niveau)	A large basal ichthyosaur	
Grippia	G. longirostris	Vendomdalen Member (Grippia Niveau)	A small basal ichthyopterygian	
Isfjordosaurus	I. minor	Vendomdalen Member (Lower Saurian Niveau)	An enigmatic ichthyosauromorph, possibly a hupehsuchian or basal ichthyopterygian	
Merriamosaurus	M. hulkei	Vendomdalen Member (Lower Saurian Niveau)	An ichthyopterygian based on forelimb fossils, initially described under the preoccupied name Rotundopteryx hulkei. Most likely a junior synonym of Pessopteryx nisseri.	
Omphalosaurus	O. nisseri	Vendomdalen Member (Lower Saurian Niveau)	Weathered jaw fragments and other omphalosaurid-like fossils of uncertain validity, some of which have also been named as O. merriami or referred to Pessopteryx nisseri.	
Omphalosaurus	O. sp.	Vendomdalen Member (Grippia and Lower Saurian Niveaus)	Some fossils referred to Omphalosaurus appear to legitimately belong to the genus.	
Pessopteryx	P. nisseri	Vendomdalen Member (Lower Saurian and Grippia Niveaus)	A large shastasaurid-like ichthyosaur, previously utilized as a chimera encompassing various ichthyopterygian fossils from the Lower Saurian Niveau.	
Quasianosteosaurus	Q. vikinghoegdai	Vendomdalen Member (Grippia Niveau)	A medium-sized ichthyopterygian	
Svalbardosaurus	S. crassidens	Vendomdalen Member (Grippia Niveau)	A dubious tetrapod based on large teeth initially referred to ichthyosaurs, but more likely belonging to temnospondyl amphibians.	
Ichthyopterygia	indet.	Lusitaniadalen Member (Fish Niveau), Vendomdalen Member (Grippia Niveau)	Indeterminate ichthyopterygian remains. Pelagic-adapted ichthyopterygian fossils from the Lusitaniadalen Member are the oldest known from Svalbard and the world. Euichthyosaurian fragments from the Grippia Niveau include maxillae and a large Besanosaurus-like surangular.	
Reptilia	indet.	Vendomdalen Member (Grippia Niveau)	An indeterminate reptile fossil (SVT 203) previously referred to Grippia longirostris. Postcranial proportions differ from all known ichthyosauromorphs, and may instead suggest affinities with Helveticosaurus or placodonts.	

==== Amphibians ====
Temnospondyl teeth, cranial fragments, and large capitosaur-like vertebrae are known from the Vendomdalen Member (Grippia Niveau).

Temnospondyls of the Vikinghøgda Formation
Taxon / Genus	Species	Subunit	Notes	Images
Aphaneramma	A. rostratum	Lusitaniadalen Member (Fish Niveau)	A long-snouted lonchorhynchine trematosaurid	
Boreosaurus	B. thorslundi	Lusitaniadalen Member (Fish Niveau)	A brachyopid or rhytidosteid	
Lyrocephaliscus	L. euri	Lusitaniadalen Member (Fish Niveau)	A trematosaurine trematosaurid, formerly known as Lyrocephalus.	
Peltostega	P. erici	Lusitaniadalen Member (Fish Niveau)	A rhytidosteid	
Platystega	P. depressa	Lusitaniadalen Member (Fish Niveau)	A trematosaurine trematosaurid	
Tertrema	T. acuta	Lusitaniadalen Member (Fish Niveau)	A relatively short-snouted trematosaurid, possibly a lonchorhynchine	
Sassenisaurus	S. spitzbergensis	Lusitaniadalen Member (Fish Niveau)	Possibly an early capitosaur	

=== Fish ===
A diverse fish assemblage has been described from the late Smithian (early Olenekian) aged "Fish Niveau" (Lusitaniadalen Member, lower part of the "Sticky Keep Member") and other horizons, including lungfish, coelacanths, ray-finned fish, and hybodont sharks. Most taxa were described by Erik Stensiö. The lists below are based on Kogan & Romano and Bratvold et al.

==== Lobe-finned fish ====
Coelacanth fragments are known from the Vendomdalen Member (Grippia Niveau).

Sarcopterygii of the Vikinghøgda Formation
Taxon / Genus	Species	Subunit	Notes	Images
Ceratodus	C. sp.	Vendomdalen Member (below Lower Saurian Niveau, Grippia Niveau)	Tooth plate of a lungfish	
Axelia	A. robusta	Lusitaniadalen Member (Fish Niveau)	A coelacanthid coelacanth	
Axelia	A. elegans	Lusitaniadalen Member (Fish Niveau)	A coelacanthid coelacanth	
Mylacanthus	M. lobatus	Lusitaniadalen Member (Fish Niveau)	A coelacanthid coelacanth, quite similar to Axelia.	
Mylacanthus	M. spinosus	Lusitaniadalen Member (Fish Niveau)	A coelacanthid coelacanth, quite similar to Axelia.	
Sassenia	S. tuberculata	Lusitaniadalen Member (Fish Niveau)	A rhabdodermatid coelacanth	
Sassenia	S.? guttata	Lusitaniadalen Member (Fish Niveau)	A rhabdodermatid coelacanth? Dubious generic attribution.	
Sassenia	S. sp.	Lusitaniadalen Member (Fish Niveau)	A rhabdodermatid coelacanth	
Scleracanthus	S. asper	Lusitaniadalen Member (Fish Niveau)	A coelacanth, quite similar to Axelia.	
Wimania	W. sinuosa	Lusitaniadalen Member (Fish Niveau)	A relatively large coelacanthid coelacanth	
Wimania	W.? multistriata	Lusitaniadalen Member (Fish Niveau)	A coelacanth	
Wimania	W.? sp.	Lusitaniadalen Member (Fish Niveau)	A coelacanth	

==== Ray-finned fish ====
Actinopterygii of the Vikinghøgda Formation
Taxon / Genus	Species	Subunit	Notes	Images
Acrorhabdus	A. bertili	Lusitaniadalen Member (Fish Niveau)	A ptycholepid	
Acrorhabdus	A. asplundi	Lusitaniadalen Member (Fish Niveau)	A ptycholepid	
Acrorhabdus	A. latistriatus	Lusitaniadalen Member (Fish Niveau)	A ptycholepid	
Birgeria	B. aldingeri	Lusitaniadalen Member (Fish Niveau)	A birgeriid.The material was originally referred to B. mougeoti, the type species of Birgeria, but was later ascribed to its own species	
Birgeria	B. sp.	Lusitaniadalen Member (Fish Niveau), Vendomdalen Member (Grippia Niveau)	A large Birgeria, including a partial skull and teeth	
Bobasatrania	B. sp.	Vendomdalen Member (Grippia Niveau)	A bobasatraniform	
Bobasatrania	B. nathorsti	Lusitaniadalen Member (Fish Niveau)	A large bobasatraniform that was originally referred to as Platysomus nathorsti	
Boreosomus	B. arcticus	Lusitaniadalen Member (Fish Niveau)	A ptycholepid and the type species of Boreosomus, which was originally described as Acrolepis arctica by Arthur Smith Woodward	
Boreosomus	B. reuterskioldi	Lusitaniadalen Member (Fish Niveau)	A ptycholepid	
Boreosomus	B.? scaber	Lusitaniadalen Member (Fish Niveau)		
Pteronisculus	P. gyrolepidoides	Lusitaniadalen Member (Fish Niveau)	A poorly known rhadinichthyid or turseoid, It was originally described as Glaucolepis gyrolepidoides, but later referred to the genus Pteronisculus because the genus name Glaucolepis is preoccupied	
Pygopterus	P. degeeri	Lusitaniadalen Member (Fish Niveau)	A pygopterid. Pygopterus is one of the genera of ray-finned fish that crossed the Permian-Triassic boundary	
Saurichthys	S. elongatus	Lusitaniadalen Member (Fish Niveau) and possibly in beds slightly above it	A saurichthyiform with a slender, elongated rostrum	
Saurichthys	S. hamiltoni	Lusitaniadalen Member (Fish Niveau)	A saurichthyiform	
Saurichthys	S. ornatus	Lusitaniadalen Member (Fish Niveau)	A saurichthyiform. This species is known primarily from skull remains	
Saurichthys	S. ornatus?	Lusitaniadalen Member (Fish Niveau)	A saurichthyiform. Based on one specimen that shows the postcranium and which has a different scale pattern than S. ornatus	
Saurichthys	S. wimani	Lusitaniadalen Member (Fish Niveau)	A saurichthyiform. Based on a specimen preserving the skull and anteriormost body portion that was originally described as "Belonorhynchus" wimani by Arthur Smith Woodward. A later found postcranium was referred to this species	
Saurichthys	S. sp.	Lusitaniadalen Member (Fish Niveau), Vendomdalen Member (Grippia Niveau)	A saurichthyiform	
Teffichthys	T. woodwardi	Lusitaniadalen Member (Fish Niveau)	A perleidiform. It was originally described as Colobodus altilepis by Arthur Smith Woodward but later referred to as Perleidus woodwardi (the species name was changed to avoid confusion with the type species of Perleidus, P. altolepis). The Early Triassic species of Perleidus were later ascribed to a different genus, Teffichthys	

==== Cartilaginous fish ====
Chondrichthyan remains are predominantly known from the Vendomdalen Member (Grippia Niveau). Several species listed below are also present in the nearby Vardebukta Formation, of Dienerian (late Induan) age.

Chondrichthyes of the Vikinghøgda Formation
Taxon / Genus	Species	Subunit	Notes	Images
Acrodus	A. gaillardoti	Vendomdalen Member (Grippia Niveau)	An acrodontid hybodontiform shark. Only known from isolated teeth	
Acrodus	A. lateralis	Vendomdalen Member (Grippia Niveau)	An acrodontid hybodontiform shark. Only known from isolated teeth	
Acrodus	A. oppenheimeri	Vendomdalen Member (Grippia Niveau)	An acrodontid hybodontiform shark. Only known from isolated teeth	
Acrodus	A. scaber	Vendomdalen Member (Grippia Niveau)	An acrodontid hybodontiform shark. Only known from isolated teeth	
Acrodus	A. spitzbergensis	Vendomdalen Member (Grippia Niveau)	An acrodontid hybodontiform shark. Only known from isolated teeth	
Acrodus	A. vermiformis	Vendomdalen Member (Grippia Niveau)	An acrodontid hybodontiform shark. Only known from isolated teeth	
Acrodus	A. sp.	Vendomdalen Member (Grippia Niveau)	An acrodontid hybodontiform shark. Only known from isolated teeth	
Hybodus	H. microdus/ H. ?microdus	Vendomdalen Member (Grippia Niveau)	A hybodontid hybodontiform shark. Only known from isolated teeth	
Hybodus	H. rapax	Vendomdalen Member (Grippia Niveau)	A hybodontid hybodontiform shark. Only known from isolated teeth	
Hybodus	H. sasseniensis	Vendomdalen Member (Grippia Niveau)	A hybodontid hybodontiform shark. Only known from isolated teeth	
Lissodus	L. angulatus	Vendomdalen Member (Grippia Niveau)	A lonchidiid hybodontiform shark. Only known from isolated teeth that were originally described as Polyacrodus angulatus	
Nemacanthus	N. sp.	Vendomdalen Member (Grippia Niveau)	A palaeospinacid synechodontiform shark. Only known from fin spines	
Palaeobates	P. polaris	Lusitaniadalen Member (Fish Niveau), Vendomdalen Member (Grippia Niveau)	An acrodontid hybodontiform shark known from teeth and skelettal elements. Skull and postcranial elements are only known from the Fish Niveau	
Palaeobates	P. sp.	Vendomdalen Member (Grippia Niveau)	An acrodontid hybodontiform shark. Only known from isolated teeth	
Polyacrodus	P. sp.	Vendomdalen Member (Grippia Niveau)	A polyacrodontid hybodontiform shark known from skull	
Hybodontoidea	Gen. et sp. indet.1	Vendomdalen Member (Grippia Niveau)	Basal plate of cephalic spine	
Hybodontoidea	Gen. et sp. indet.2	Vendomdalen Member (Grippia Niveau)	Fin spine	
Hybodontoidea	Gen. et sp. indet.3	Vendomdalen Member (Grippia Niveau)	Fin spine	
Synechodontiformes	Gen. et sp. indet.1	Vendomdalen Member (Grippia Niveau)	Isolated teeth (similar to Eorapax, Synechodus, and Wimanodon) and fin spines (similar to Acronemus and Nemacanthus).	
Synechodontiformes	Gen. et sp. indet.2	Vendomdalen Member (Grippia Niveau)	Isolated teeth (similar to Eorapax, Synechodus, and Wimanodon) and fin spines (similar to Acronemus and Nemacanthus).	

== See also ==
- List of fossiliferous stratigraphic units in Norway
