= Myren =

Myren is a surname. Notable people with the surname include:

- Klara Myrén (born 1991), Swedish ice hockey player
- Ronald L. Myren (1937–2003), Canadian artist
- Scott P. Myren (born 1964), American jurist
- Ursula Myrén (born 1966), Swedish judoka

== See also ==
- Myren, community in Munising Township, Michigan
- Myren Formation, geological formation in Norway
- Myrens Verksted, industrial area of Norway
