= Kapp Toscana =

Headland in Spitsbergen, Svalbard

Coordinates: 77.555°N 15.057°E

Kapp Toscana is a headland at the southern side of Van Keulenfjorden in Wedel Jarlsberg Land at Spitsbergen, Svalbard. It is named after an Austrian family. West of the headland is the bay of Bourbonhamna, extending from Kapp Toscana to Kapp Madrid. East of the headland is the bay of Ingebrigtsenbukta, extending from Kapp Toscana to Ålesundneset.

== Geology ==
Kapp Toscana has given name to the Triassic Kapp Toscana Group, comprising the rock formations of Tschermakfjellet, De Geerdalen and Wilhelmøya.
