= Festningen Sandstone =

Geologic formation in Svalbard, Norway

- Stratigraphic range: Barremian; ~125–120 Ma
- Type: Member
- Unit of: Helvetiafjellet Formation

Lithology
- Primary: Sandstone

Location
- Coordinates: 78.1°N 14.0°E
- Approximate paleocoordinates: 69.4°N 17.5°E
- Region: Svalbard
- Country: Norway
- Festningen Sandstone (Svalbard)

The Festningen Sandstone is an Early Cretaceous (Barremian) geologic member in Svalbard, in the far north of Norway. Fossil ornithopod tracks have been reported from the formation.

== See also ==
- List of dinosaur-bearing rock formations
  - List of stratigraphic units with ornithischian tracks
    - Ornithopod tracks
- List of fossiliferous stratigraphic units in Norway
- Lunde Formation
- Camarillas Formation
- South Polar region of the Cretaceous
