= Gipsdalen Group =

Norwegian geological group

- Stratigraphic range: Permian
- Type: Group

Location
- Country: Norway

The Gipsdalen Group is a geologic group in Norway. It preserves fossils dating back to the Permian period.

== See also ==
- List of fossiliferous stratigraphic units in Norway
