= Braksøya Formation =

Norwegian geological formation

- Stratigraphic range: Sheinwoodian; ~428–426 Ma
- Type: Formation
- Overlies: Ringerike & Modum: Bruflat Formation; Skien & Holmestrand: Porsgrunn & Skinnerbukta Formations

Lithology
- Primary: Limestone

Location
- Coordinates: 60.0°N 10.2°E
- Approximate paleocoordinates: 21.1°S 8.1°W
- Region: Buskerud
- Country: Norway
- Extent: Shallow Caledonian foreland basin

Type section
- Named for: Braksøya naturreservat
- Braksøya Formation (Norway)

The Braksøya Formation is a geologic formation in the Ringerike and Modum areas in Buskerud, Norway, where it overlies the Bruflat Formation and the Skien and Holmestrand areas where it overlies the Porsgrunn Formation and Skinnerbukta Formation respectively. The formation, deposited in a shallow Caledonian foreland basin at the edge of a closing Iapetus Ocean, preserves fossils dating back to the Sheinwoodian stage of the Silurian period.

== Fossil content ==
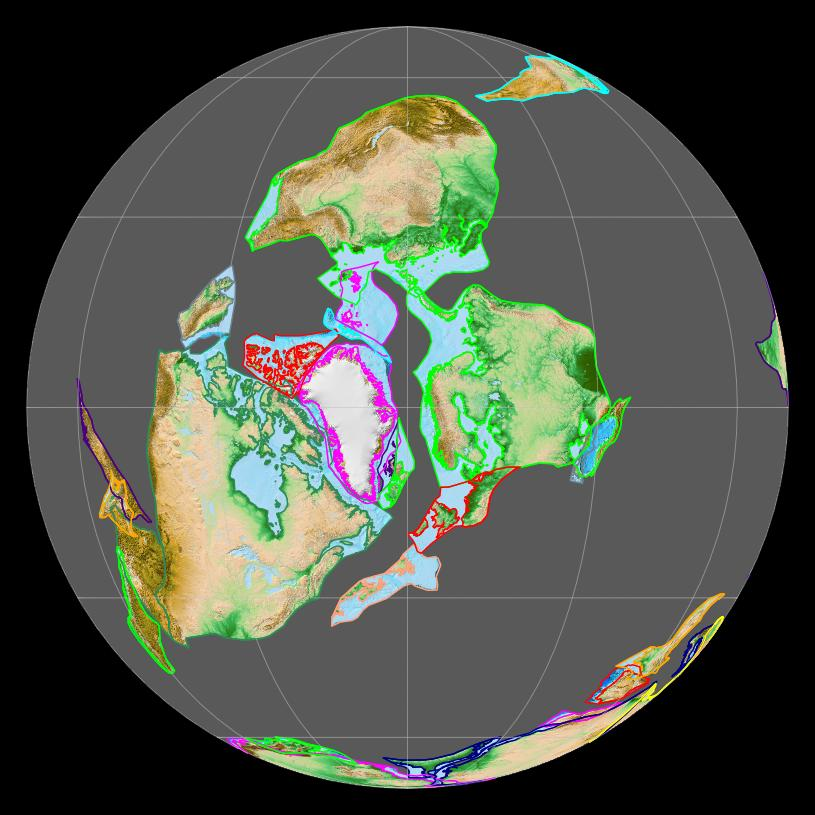
Paleogeography of the Early Silurian with the closing Iapetus Ocean due to the Caledonian orogeny between Greenland and Norway

The stromatoporoid bioherms of the Braksøya Formation have provided fossils of:

- Stromatoporida
  - Syringostromellidae
    - Syringostromella cf. aspectabilis
- Actinostromatida
  - Actinostromatidae
    - Plectostroma norvegicum
- Clathrodictyida
  - Clathrodictyidae
    - Clathrodictyon cf. crickmayi

== See also ==
- List of fossiliferous stratigraphic units in Norway
- Buildwas Formation, Sheinwoodian type formation in England
- Llallagua Formation, Sheinwoodian fossiliferous formation in Bolivia
