= Tschermakfjellet =

Mountain in Svalbard, Norway

Coordinates: 78.519°N 15.306°E

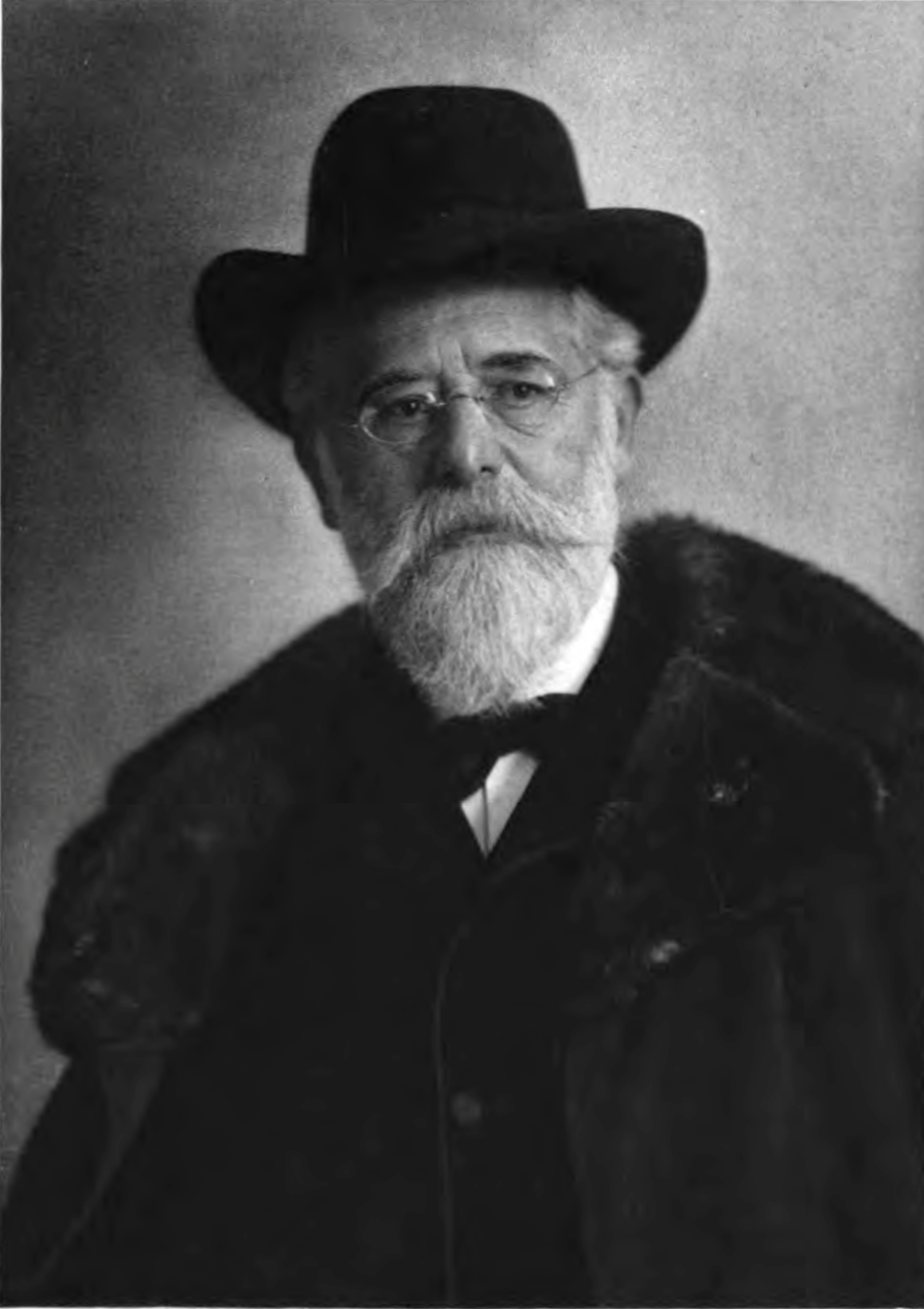
Tschermakfjellet is named after Gustav Tschermak

Tschermakfjellet is a mountain in Dickson Land at Spitsbergen, Svalbard. It has a height of 422 m.a.s.l., and is located between the valley of Sauriedalen and Kongressfjellet. The mountain is named after Austrian mineralogist Gustav Tschermak von Seysenegg.

== Geology ==
The mountain has given name to the Triassic Tschermakfjellet Formation of the Kapp Toscana Group, consisting of sandstones and silty shales.
