= Kapp Dunér =

Headland of Bjørnøya, Svalbard

- Cape
- Coordinates: 74°28′18″N 18°45′00″E
- Location: Bjørnøya, Svalbard, Norway

Kapp Dunér is a headland at the island of Bjørnøya of the Svalbard archipelago, Norway. It is the westernmost point of Bjørnøya. The point is named after Swedish astronomer Nils Christoffer Dunér.

The site has given name to the geological unit Kapp Dunér Formation, a lithostratigraphic formation of Permian age which consists mainly of dolomites and limestones, with minor components of sandstones and conglomerates.

== See also ==
- Dunérfjellet
- Dunérbukta
