= Norderhov Formation =

Geological formation in Norway

- Stratigraphic range: Ordovician
- Type: Formation

Location
- Country: Norway

The Norderhov Formation is a geologic formation in Norway. It preserves fossils dating back to the Ordovician period.

== See also ==
- List of fossiliferous stratigraphic units in Norway
