= Elnes =

Elnes may refer to:

- Elnes, Pas-de-Calais, Hauts-de-France, France
- Elnes, Norway
  - Elnes Formation
  - Elnes Station
- Electron energy loss spectroscopy
