= Vollen =

Vollen may refer:

== Places ==
- Vollen, Asker, a village in Asker municipality in Akershus county, Norway
- Vollen, Innlandet, a village in Vestre Slidre municipality in Innlandet county, Norway
- Vollen, Troms, a village in Tromsø municipality in Troms county, Norway
- Vollen, Vestfold, a village in Færder municipality in Vestfold county, Norway
- Vollen, part of the Gangsås neighborhood in the town of Harstad in Troms county, Norway

== People ==
- Iselin Vollen Steiro, a Norwegian fashion model from Harstad, Norway
- Laurie Lola Vollen, a scholar and human rights activist

== Other ==
- Vollen Formation, a geologic formation in Norway
- Vollen Ungdomslag, a sports club in Vollen, Akershus
