= Hordaland (disambiguation) =

Hordaland is a former county of Norway.

Hordaland may also refer to:

- Hordaland (newspaper), published in Voss, Norway
- Hordaland County Municipality
- Hordaland Formation, a geologic formation in Norway
- Hordaland Police District
- Petty kingdoms of Norway#Kingdom of Hordaland

== See also ==
- Coat of arms of Hordaland
- Eirik of Hordaland, 9th century king of Hordaland
- Hordaland Folkeblad, a Norwegian newspaper published in Norheimsund
- Hordalands doedskvad, an album by Norwegian band Taake
- List of churches in Hordaland
- List of County Governors of Hordaland
- List of municipalities in Hordaland, Norway
- List of villages in Hordaland
