= Kapp Toscana Group =

Geologic group in Norway

- Stratigraphic range: Longobardian; ~242–235 Ma
- Type: Group
- Sub-units: Tschermakfjellet, De Geerdalen & Wilhelmøya Formations
- Underlies: Adventdalen Group; Knorringfjellet Formation
- Overlies: Sassendalen Group
- Thickness: 8–500 m (26–1,640 ft)

Lithology
- Primary: Siltstone

Location
- Coordinates: 77.5°N 14.9°E
- Approximate paleocoordinates: 41.7°N 2.5°E
- Region: Svalbard & Jan Mayen, Barents Sea
- Country: Norway

Type section
- Named for: Kapp Toscana
- Kapp Toscana Group (Svalbard)

The Kapp Toscana Group is a geologic group in Svalbard and Jan Mayen in the Barents Sea, Norway.

== Description ==
The group dates back to the Late Triassic, and comprises the rock formations of Tschermakfjellet, De Geerdalen and Wilhelmøya. The group is named from the headland of Kapp Toscana at the southern side of Van Keulenfjorden in Wedel Jarlsberg Land at Spitsbergen, Svalbard. The thickness of the group varies from 8–500 metres (26–1,640 ft) of deltaic shales with interbedded sandstones.

The Kapp Toscana Group was initially defined as a formation, but has later become a group. The type section was taken from Kapp Toscana at Van Keulenfjorden, where the thickness of the unit was 200 metres (660 ft), while its two members Tschermakfjellet and De Geerdalen had type sections from Botneheia.
