= Vardebukta Formation =

Geologic formation in Svalbard, Norway

- Stratigraphic range: Induan; ~251.9–251.2 Ma
- Type: Formation

Lithology
- Primary: Conglomerate
- Other: Sandstone, lime mudstone, packstone

Location
- Coordinates: 77°N 16.2°E
- Approximate paleocoordinates: 41.0°N 9.4°E
- Region: Svalbard
- Country: Norway
- Vardebukta Formation (Svalbard)

The Vardebukta Formation is a geologic formation in Norway. It preserves fossils dating back to the Induan stage (early Early Triassic). Outcrops are known from the Hornsund area but also from Bellsund and Isfjorden areas.

== Subunits ==
The Vardebukta Formation is divided into the Urnetoppen Member and the overlying Wibebreen Member. Both members are of marine origin. They were deposited in a sublittoral to shallow-neritic environment. The Vardebukta Formation represents the oldest Mesozoic formation in Svalbard.

=== Urnetoppen Member ===
The Urnetoppen Member, which is approximately 30 meter thick in the Hornsund area, consists of greenish shales, siltstone and fine-grained sandstone, occasionally with clay-ironstone nodules. In the Hornsund area, it rests paraconformably on the Permian Kapp Starostin Formation. The Urnetoppen Member is correlated with the Deltadalen Member of the Vikinghøgda Formation, which is of Dienerian (late Induan) age.

The top of the Urnetoppen Member contains the so-called Brevassfjellet Myalina beds, a 5–6 meter thick, fossiliferous conglomerate.

=== Wibebreen Member ===
The Wibebreen Member is ca. 90–100 meter thick in the Hornsund area. It consists of black to light-grey coloured shales, marly shales, arenaceous marls and siltstone. The lower part of this member contains mainly siltsone layers. The locally developed Skilisen Retzia Limestone belongs to the uppermost part of the Wibebreen Member. The Wibebreen Member is overlain by the Smithian (early Olenekian) aged Lusitaniadalen Member (="Sticky Keep Member") of the Vikinghøgda Formation.

== Paleobiota ==
Fossiliferous layers of the Vardebukta Formation are concentrated to the uppermost part of the Urnetoppen Member (Brevassfjellet Myalina beds). These Dienerian aged beds have yielded the bivalves Myalina and Anodontophora, crinoids, conodonts, numerous isolated fish remains, and trace fossils.

=== Fish ===
The isolated fish teeth of bony and cartilaginous fishes have been described from the Brevassfjellet Myalina Bed (upper Urnetoppen Member of the Vardebukta Formation) of Hyrnefjellet, Hornsund. The bony fish teeth are mostly tentatively referred to Saurichthys sp.

Color key: Taxon / Reclassified taxon / Taxon falsely reported as present / Dubious taxon or junior synonym / Ichnotaxon / Ootaxon / Morphotaxon	Notes; Uncertain or tentative taxa are in small text; ~~crossed out~~ taxa are discredited.

Chondrichthyes of the Vardebukta Formation
Taxon / Genus	Species	Subunit	Notes	Images
Acrodus	A. spitzbergensis	Brevassfjellet Myalina Bed	An acrodontid hybodontiform shark. Only known from isolated teeth	Hybodus
Hybodus	H. microdus	Brevassfjellet Myalina Bed	A hybodontid hybodontiform shark. Only known from isolated teeth	Hybodus
Hybodus	H. sasseniensis	Brevassfjellet Myalina Bed	A hybodontid hybodontiform shark. Only known from isolated teeth	Hybodus
Hybodus	H. sp.	Brevassfjellet Myalina Bed	A hybodontid hybodontiform shark. Only known from isolated teeth	Hybodus
Lissodus	L. angulatus	Brevassfjellet Myalina Bed	A lonchidiid hybodontiform shark (previously referred to as Polyacrodus angulatus)	Hybodus
Palaeobates	P. sp.	Brevassfjellet Myalina Bed	An acrodontid hybodontiform shark. Only known from isolated teeth	Hybodus
Edestidae	Gen. et sp. indet.	Brevassfjellet Myalina Bed	A eugeneodont holocephalian. Only known from two incomplete teeth	Hybodus

== See also ==
- List of fossiliferous stratigraphic units in Norway
