= Edward H. Anderson =

American politician and Mormon leader (1858–1928)

- Born: Edward Henry Anderson; October 8, 1858; Billeberga, Sweden
- Died: February 1, 1928 (aged 69); Salt Lake City, Utah
- Known for: Author, politician

Edward Henry Anderson (October 8, 1858 – February 1, 1928) was a missionary and local leader of the Church of Jesus Christ of Latter-day Saints as well as a writer and editor.

Anderson is the author of the biography The Life of Brigham Young. The book is an account written sixteen years following Brigham Young's death in 1877. In this volume, Young's activities during his early years in Mormonism are discussed; his close relationship with Joseph Smith; and the rise of his leadership following Smith's death.

Anderson was born in Billeberga, Sweden. His family joined the Church of Jesus Christ of Latter-day Saints (LDS Church) when he was young and they came to Utah Territory in 1864 in William B. Preston's Mormon pioneer company.

In 1869, Anderson was baptized a member of the LDS Church. He lived in Millcreek, Farmington and Huntsville, Utah, in his early years. He graduated from the University of Utah in 1877 and then became a teacher in Weber County, Utah. In 1881, he married Jane Ballantyne, a daughter of Richard Ballantyne, the founder of the LDS Church's Sunday School movement.

In about 1880, Anderson entered the newspaper business in Ogden, Utah. He later served on the staff of The Contributor. From 1890 to 1892, Anderson served as president of the Scandinavian Mission of the LDS Church. In 1893, he became a member of the Young Men's Mutual Improvement Association (YMMIA) General Board and in 1899 succeeded B. H. Roberts as associate editor of the Improvement Era. In 1900, Anderson became a member of the Weber Stake High Council. Anderson served in the YMMIA until 1907.

Anderson was still listed as co-editor of the Improvement Era in 1922, with Heber J. Grant, the President of the LDS Church, listed as the other editor.

In addition to his biography of Brigham Young, Anderson also wrote A Brief History of the Church. Andrew Jenson also included some of writings by Anderson in his Latter-day Saints Biographical Encyclopedia.

Anderson served as the clerk of the LDS Church's general conference on several occasions in the 1910s and 1920s.

In 1900, Anderson was elected to the Utah House of Representatives as a Republican. He was appointed surveyor-general for Utah, a federal appointment, in 1901.

Anderson and his wife Jane had seven children.
