= Nils Christoffer Dunér =

Swedish astronomer (1839–1914)

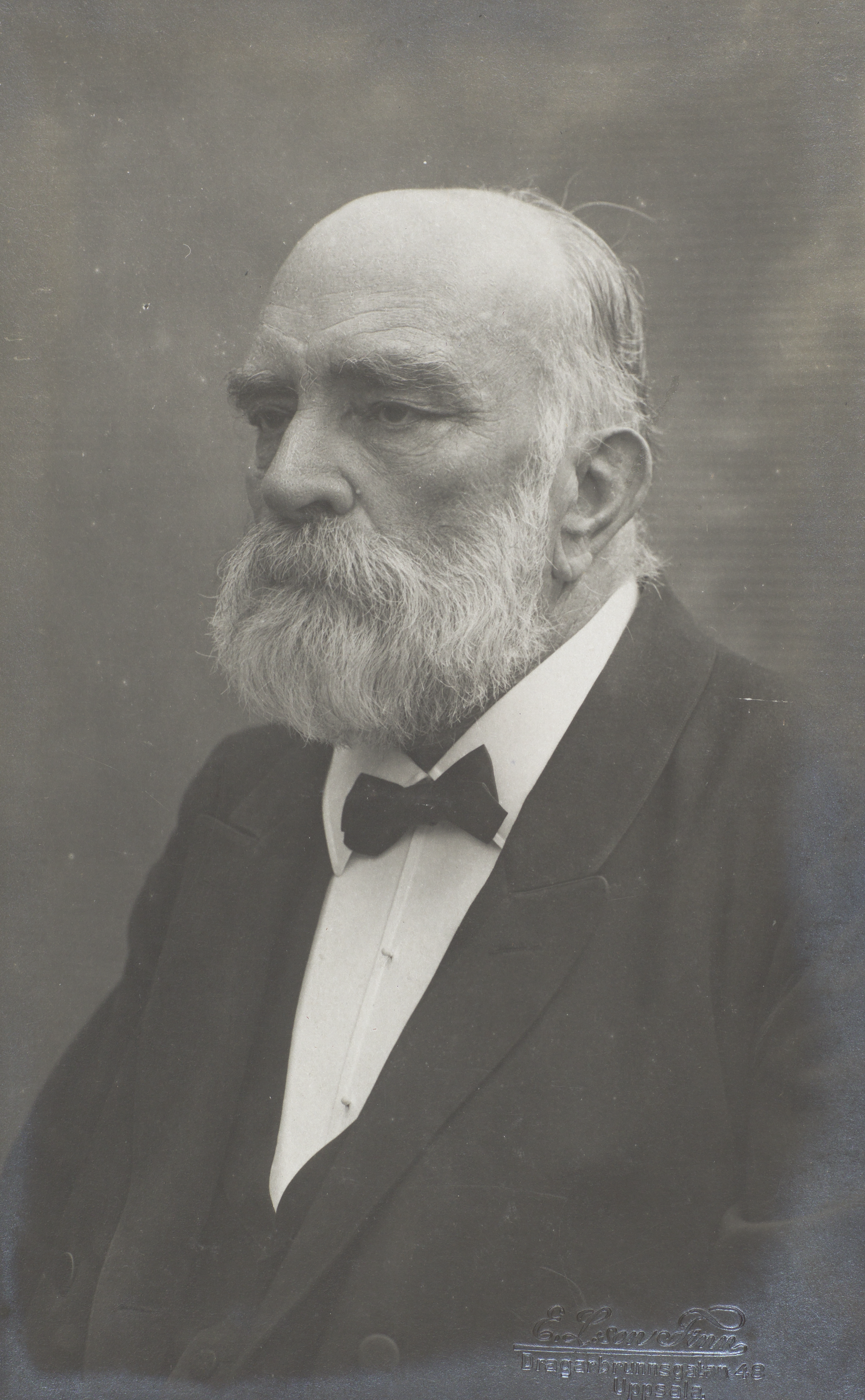
- Nils Christoffer Dunér (ca 1900)
- Born: 21 May 1839; Billeberga, Malmöhus län
- Died: 10 November 1914 (aged 75); Stockholm
- Education: Lund University
- Awards: Rumford Medal in 1892
- Scientific career
- Fields: astronomy
- Workplaces: Uppsala University

Nils Christoffer Dunér (Billeberga, Malmöhus län 21 May 1839 – Stockholm 10 November 1914) was a Swedish astronomer. His parents were Nils Dunér and Petronella (née Schlyter).

Dunér received his doctorate from Lund University in 1862, was observer at the observatory there from 1864 and Professor of Astronomy at Uppsala University from 1888.

He was awarded the Prix Lalande in 1887 and the Rumford Medal in 1892. The crater Dunér on the Moon is named after him. At Svalbard, Dunérfjellet on Svenskøya, Dunérbukta in Sabine Land, and Kapp Dunér, the western point of Bjørnøya, are named after him.
