= Kongressfjellet =

Mountain in Svalbard, Norway

Highest point
- Elevation: 604 m (1,982 ft)
- Coordinates: 78°33′12″N 15°22′23″E

Kongressfjellet is a mountain in Dickson Land at Spitsbergen, Svalbard. It has a height of 605 m.a.s.l., and is located between the valleys of Idodalen (north) and Sauriedalen (east), and the mountain of Tschermakfjellet (south).
