= Dunérbukta =

Bay in Svalbard, Norway

Coordinates: 78.187°N 18.880°E

Dunérbukta is a bay on the western shore of Storfjorden, in Sabine Land, Spitsbergen, Svalbard. It was named after Swedish astronomer Nils Christoffer Dunér. The glacier Ulvebreen debouches into the bay. On the northern side of the bay is the mountain Domen and the ridge Kapp Johannesen.

== See also ==
- Dunérfjellet
- Kapp Dunér
