= Dunérfjellet =

Mountain on Svenskøya, Svalbard

Coordinates: 78.7972°N 26.5555°E

Dunérfjellet is a mountain on Svenskøya in Kong Karls Land, Svalbard. It has a height of 230 m.a.s.l., and is located at the northern part of the island, separated from Mohnhøgda by the mountain pass Vindsalen. The mountain is named after Swedish astronomer Nils Christoffer Dunér. Dunérfjellet has a relatively flat plateau, with steep hills down to the lowlands of Svenskøya.

== See also ==
- Dunérbukta
- Kapp Dunér
