= Biskopåsen Formation =

Geologic formation in Norway

- Type: Formation
- Unit of: Hedmark Group

Lithology
- Primary: Conglomerate

Location
- Region: Innlandet
- Country: Norway

The Biskopåsen Formation is a geologic formation in Innlandet. Norway. It preserves microfossils of Neoproterozoic age.

== See also ==
- List of fossiliferous stratigraphic units in Norway
