= Mohnhøgda =

Mountain in Svalbard, Norway

Coordinates: 78.8305°N 26.5423°E

Mohnhøgda is a mountain on Svenskøya in Kong Karls Land, Svalbard. It has a height of 285 m.a.s.l., and is located at the northern part of the island, separated from Dunérfjellet by the mountain pass Vindsalen. The mountain is named after Norwegian meteorologist and astronomer Henrik Mohn.
