= Tempelfjorden Group =

Geologic group in Norway

- Stratigraphic range: Late Permian
- Type: Group
- Underlies: Sassendalen Group
- Overlies: Gippsdalen Group

Location
- Region: Svalbard
- Country: Norway

The Tempelfjorden Group is a geologic group in central Spitsbergen, Norway. It preserves fossils dating back to the Late Permian period.

== See also ==
- List of fossiliferous stratigraphic units in Norway
