= Scleracanthus =

Scleracanthus Temporal range: early Olenekian

Scientific classification
- Kingdom: Animalia
- Phylum: Chordata
- Class: Actinistia
- Order: Coelacanthiformes
- Family: †Coelacanthidae
- Genus: †Scleracanthus; Stensiö, 1921

Type species
- †Scleracanthus asper Stensiö, 1921

Extinct genus of fishes

Scleracanthus is an extinct genus of prehistoric coelacanth lobe-finned fish. It lived during the Early Triassic epoch in what is now Spitsbergen, Svalbard.

The type and only species, Scleracanthus asper, was collected from the Lusitaniadalen Member of the Vikinghøgda Formation and is therefore Smithian (early Olenekian) in age.

== See also ==
- Sarcopterygii
- List of sarcopterygians
- List of prehistoric bony fish
