= Wimanodon =

Wimanodon Temporal range: Early Triassic

Scientific classification
- Kingdom: Animalia
- Phylum: Chordata
- Class: Chondrichthyes
- Subclass: Elasmobranchii
- Order: †Synechodontiformes
- Genus: †Wimanodon
- Species: †W. marmieri

Binomial name
- †Wimanodon marmieri Saugen et al., 2025

Extinct genus of neoselachian during the Early Triassic epoch

Wimanodon is an extinct genus of neoselachian that lived during the Early Triassic epoch.

== Distribution ==
Wimanodon marmieri fossils have been found in the Vikinghøgda Formation in Svalbard.
