= Sassendalen Group =

Geologic group in Norway

- Stratigraphic range: Induan-Olenekian; ~252–248 Ma
- Type: Group
- Sub-units: Sticky Keep & Vikinghøgda Formations
- Underlies: Kapp Toscana Group; Tschermakfjellet Formation
- Overlies: Tempelfjorden Group

Lithology
- Primary: Mudstone, siltstone
- Other: Sandstone

Location
- Coordinates: 78.0°N 22.0°E
- Approximate paleocoordinates: 42.0°N 12.1°E
- Region: Svalbard
- Country: Norway
- Extent: Central Spitsbergen Basin
- Sassendalen Group (Svalbard)

The Sassendalen Group is a geologic group in Svalbard, Norway. The marine to deltaic mudstones, siltstones and sandstones preserve fossils dating back to the Early Triassic (Induan to Olenekian) period.

== See also ==
- List of fossiliferous stratigraphic units in Norway
