= Idodalen =

Valley of Spitsbergen, Norway

Coordinates: 78°34′31″N 15°23′38″E

Idodalen is a valley in Dickson Land at Spitsbergen, Svalbard. It has a length of about 5.5 kilometers, and is located between the mountains of Kongressfjellet and Heimenfjellet. The valley is named after the constructed language of Ido. The river of Idoelva flows through the valley.
