= Wijde Bay Formation =

Geologic formation on the island of Spitzbergen, Svalbard

- Stratigraphic range: Givetian
- Type: Formation
- Unit of: Andrée Land Group
- Overlies: Grey Hoek Formation

Location
- Region: Spitsbergen, Svalbard
- Country: Norway

The Wijde Bay Formation is a geologic formation exposed on the island of Spitzbergen, Svalbard, Norway. It preserves fossils dating back to the Givetian stage of the Devonian period. It was originally known as the "Wijdefjorden Series" or the "Wijde Bay Series".

== See also ==
- List of fossiliferous stratigraphic units in Norway
