= Moenkopia =

Moenkopia Temporal range: Middle Triassic, 247.2–242.0 Ma

Scientific classification
- Domain: Eukaryota
- Kingdom: Animalia
- Phylum: Chordata
- Clade: Sarcopterygii
- Class: Actinistia
- Order: Coelacanthiformes
- Family: †Coelacanthidae
- Genus: †Moenkopia; Schaeffer & Gregory, 1961

Type species
- †Moenkopia wellesi Schaeffer & Gregory, 1961

Extinct genus of fishes

Moenkopia (meaning "for Moenkopi") is an extinct genus of prehistoric sarcopterygians from the Coelacanthidae found in the Middle Triassic Moenkopi Formation of Arizona. The type, and only species, M. wellesi, was named in 1961 in honour of Samuel Paul Welles. It is only known from the holotype, UMCP 36193, a partial skull consisting only of the basisphenoid that was collected in 1939 or 1940 by Samuel Welles and briefly noted on by him in 1947, and other assorted specimens found before 2005 in the Radar Mesa by S. J. Nesbitt, W. G. Parker and R. B. Irmis.

== See also ==
- Sarcopterygii
- List of sarcopterygians
- List of prehistoric bony fish
