= Ingebrigtsenbukta =

Bay in Svalbard, Norway

Coordinates: 77°33′10″N 15°04′15″E

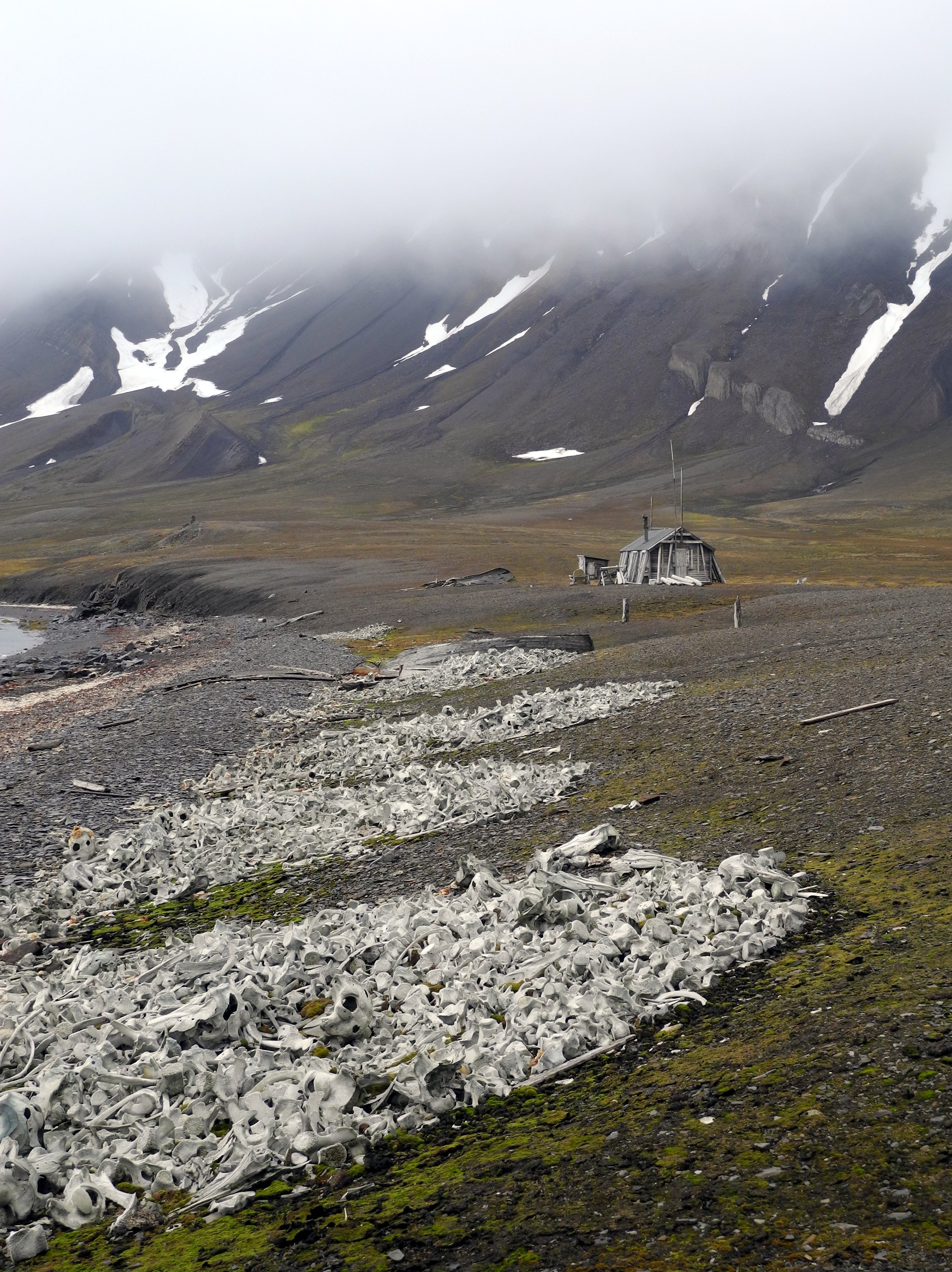
Cabin Bamsebu surrounded by whale bones

Ingebrigtsenbukta is a bay at the south shore of Van Keulenfjorden inside Sør-Spitsbergen National Park. The bay is approximately 3 km wide, running from Kapp Toscana in the west to Ålesundneset in the east. The bay was named after Norwegian whaler Morten Andreas Ingebrigtsen.

== Whaling station ==
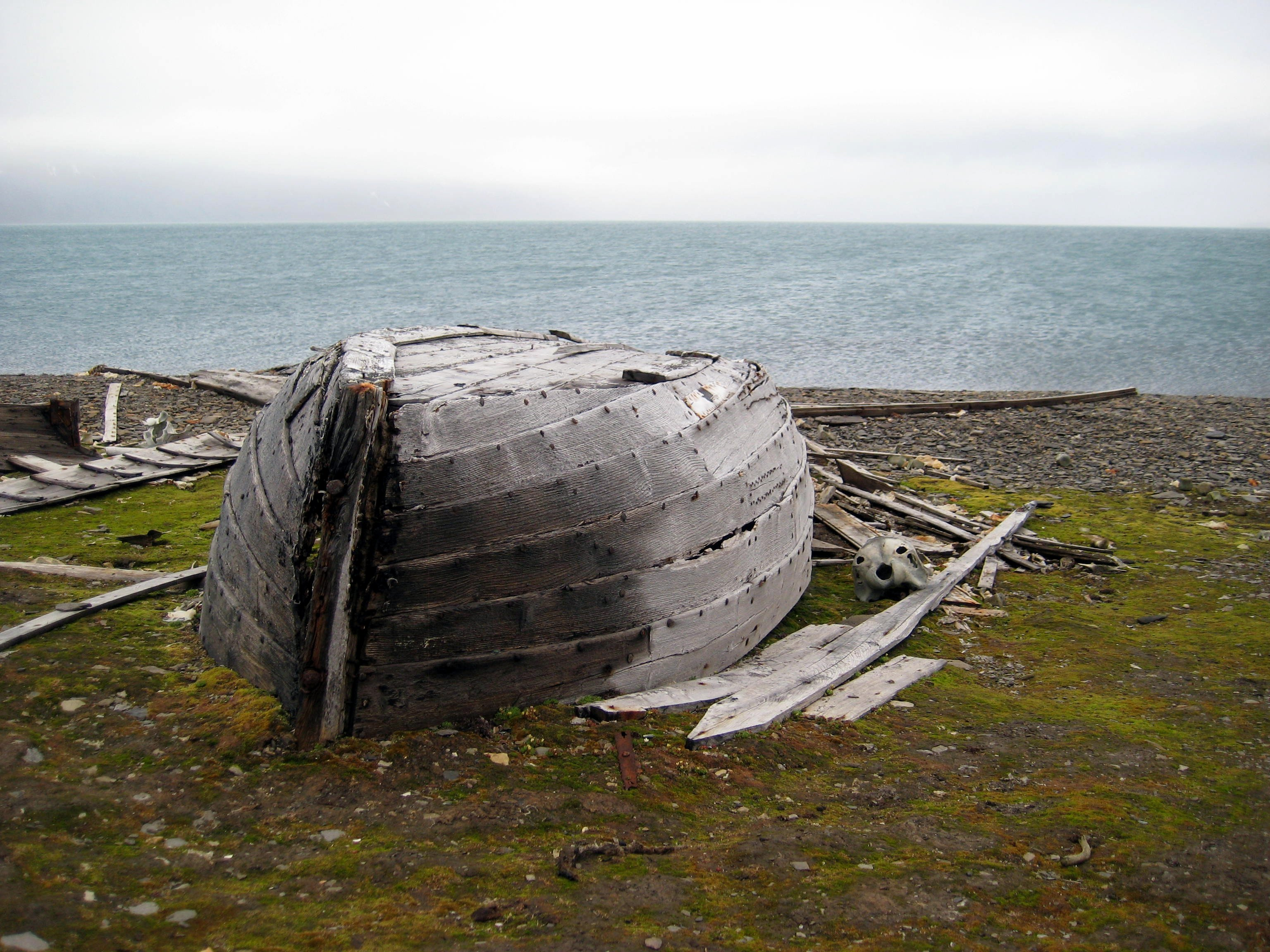
Boat of the whalers

Around 1930, a whaling station was established by Ingvald Svendsen in the western part of Ingebrigtsenbukta, near Kapp Toscana. The whalers hunted exclusively belugas. The station is the only remaining beluga whaling station in Svalbard. Thousands of beluga bones are still piled on the beach. In 1977, the number of individual whales on the beach was estimated at 550.

=== Bamsebu ===
Bamsebu is a wooden cabin that was used by whalers and is still in use today. The door and the windows have long protruding nails to prevent bears from breaking in. A small store house is located near the cabin and an overturned wooden boat (named Kjeftausa) still exists that was used for shelter and storage. On the beach are three smaller wooden boats, also overturned. From August 2019 to May 2020 and again from November 2020 to May 2021, Hilde Fålun Strøm and Sunniva Sorby, two citizen scientists resided at cabin collecting research data on climate change.

The cultural remains are protected.

== Geology ==
Kapp Toscana lends its name to the Kapp Toscana Group, a group dating from Late Triassic to Middle Jurassic.

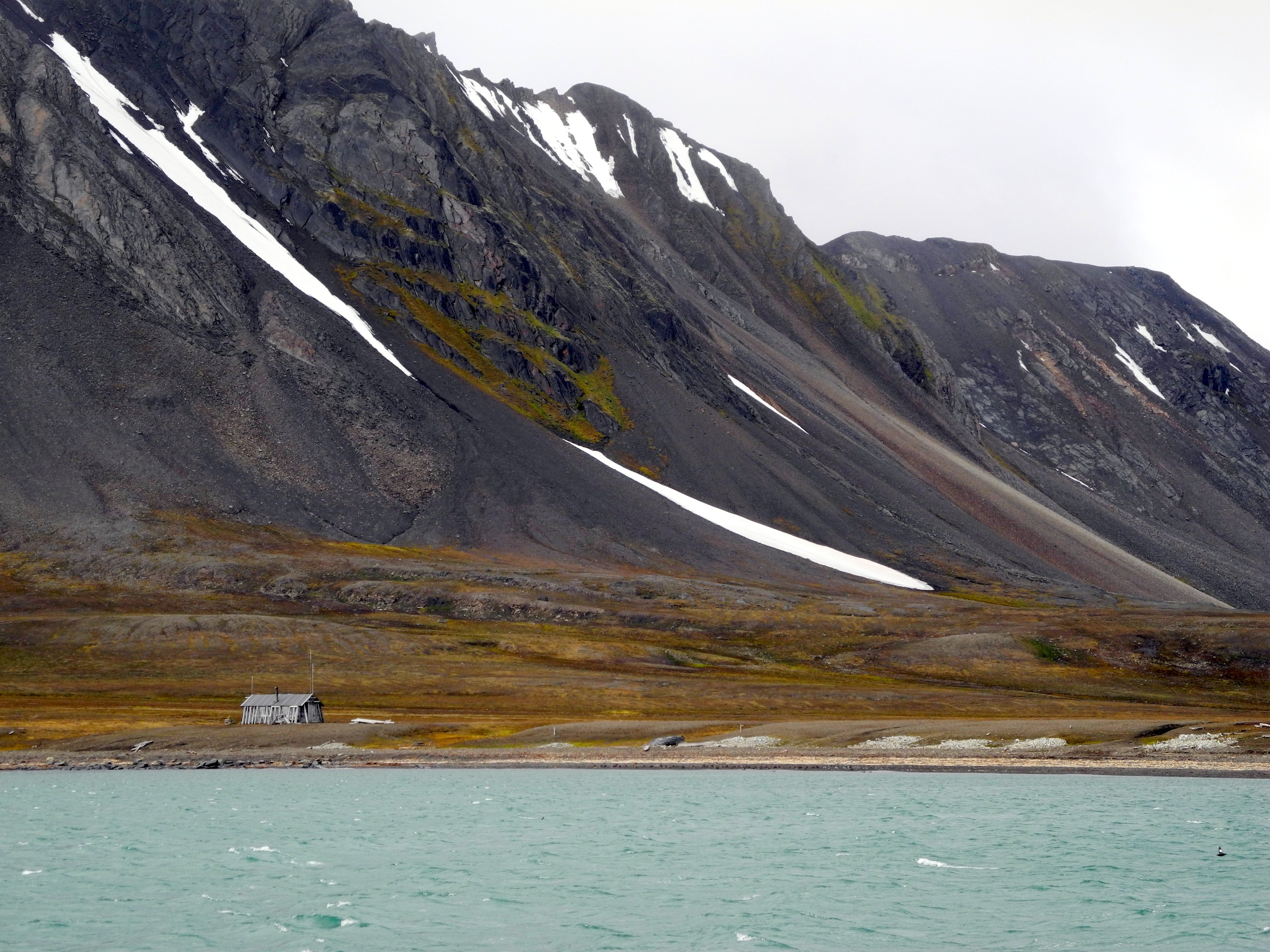
Overview

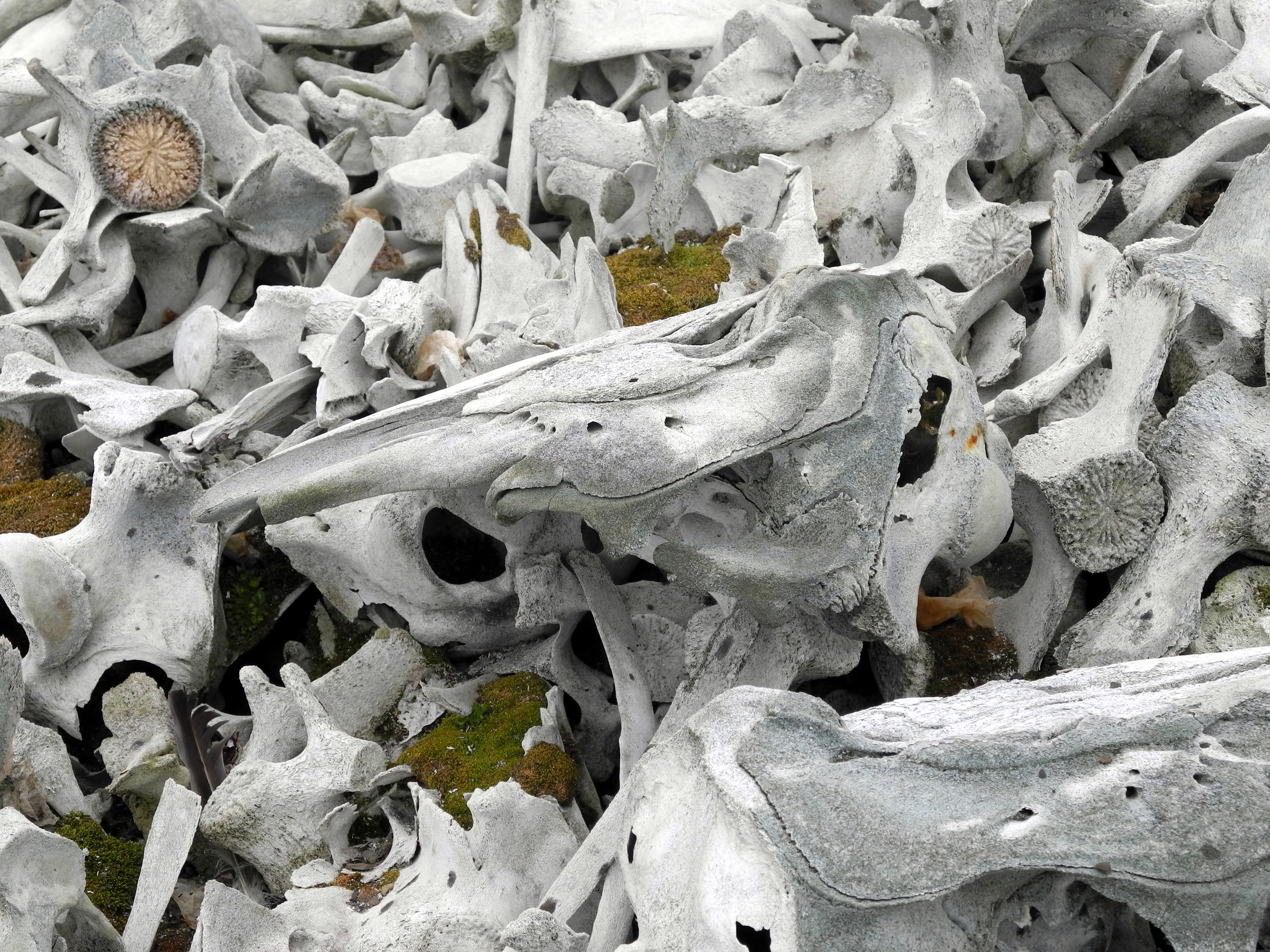
Whale bones

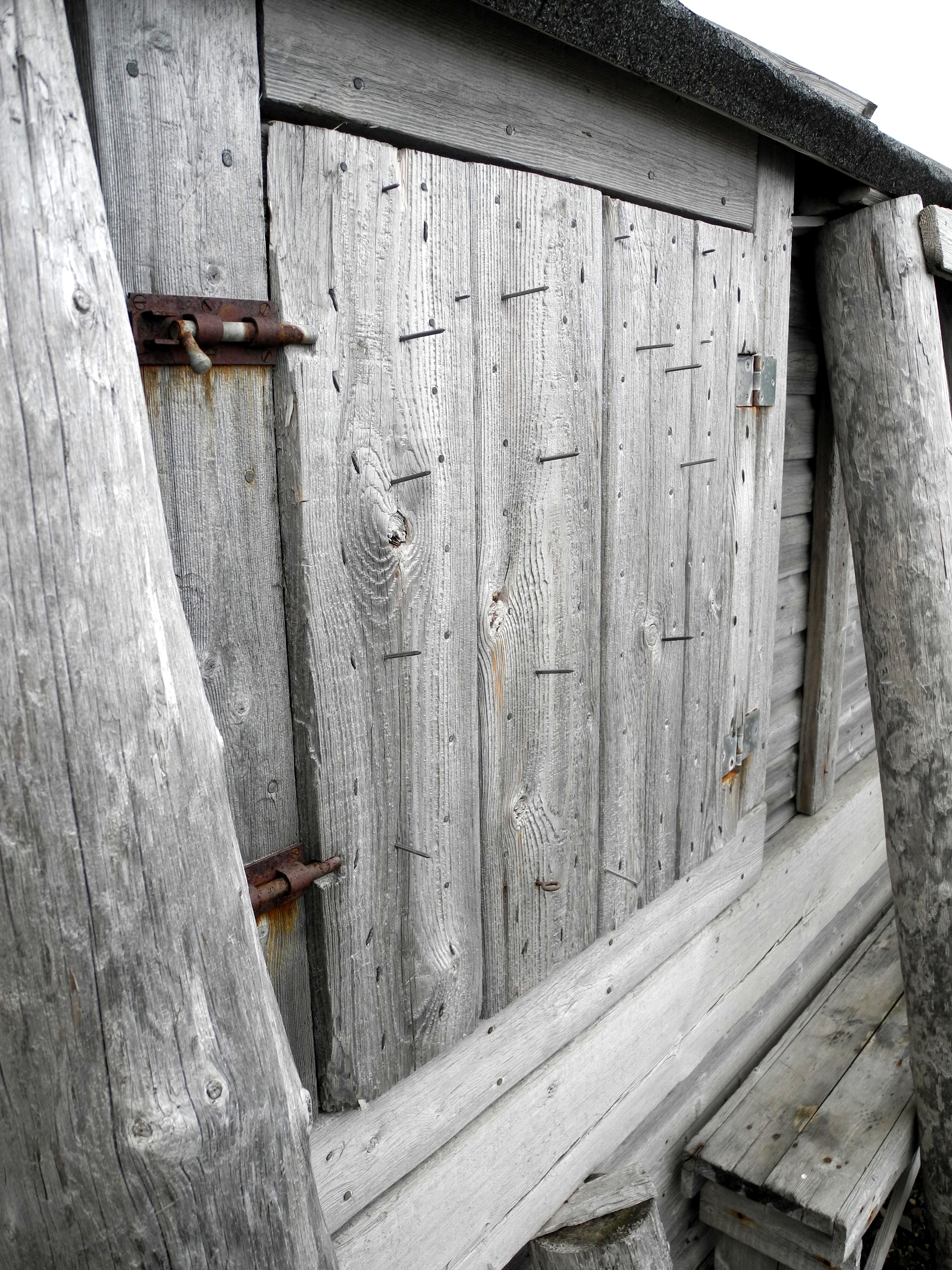
Window with polar bear protection

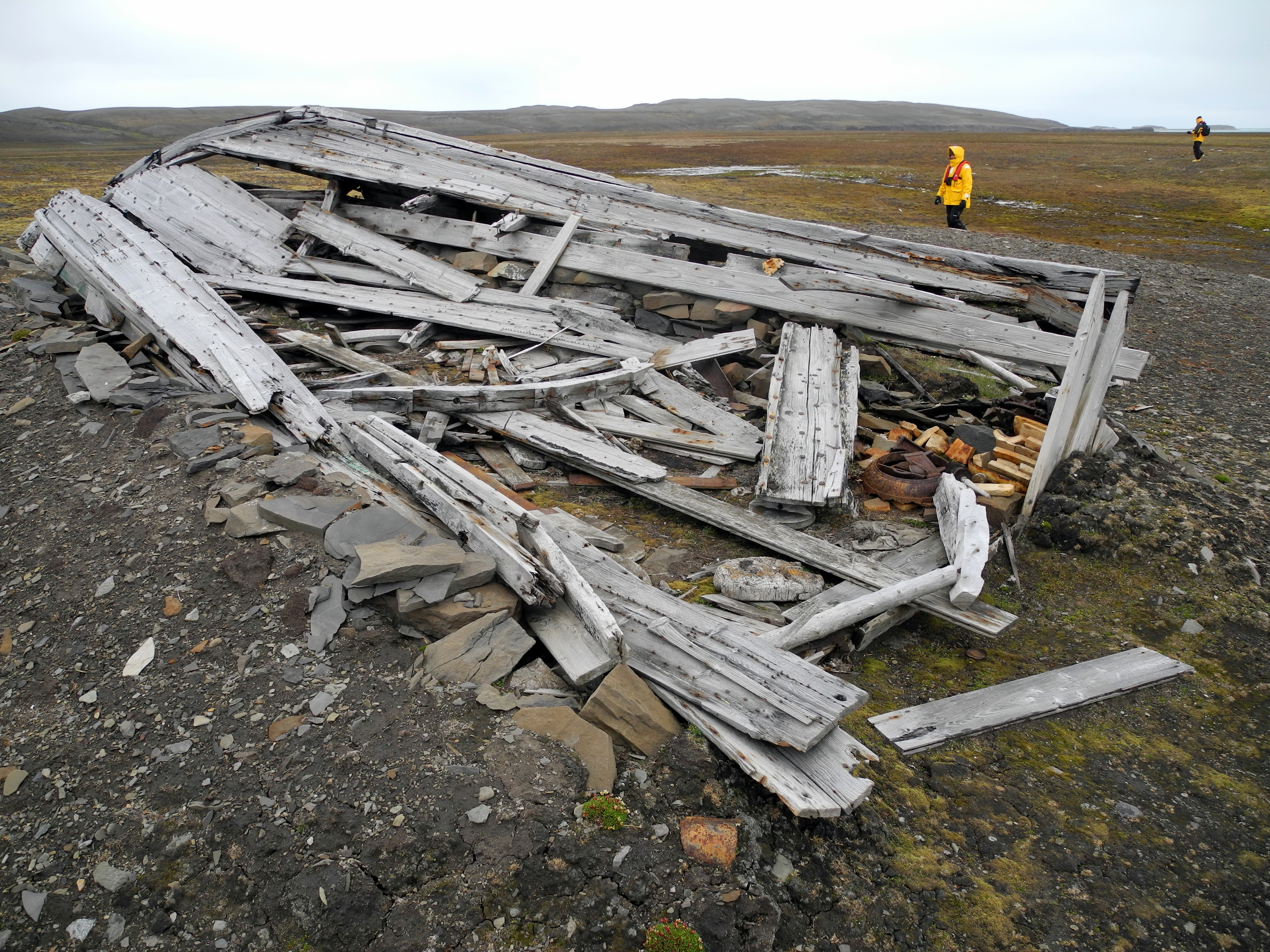
Kjeftausa
