= Langara Formation =

Geologic formation in Norway

- Stratigraphic range: Katian-Hirnantian (Rawtheyan); ~456–444 Ma
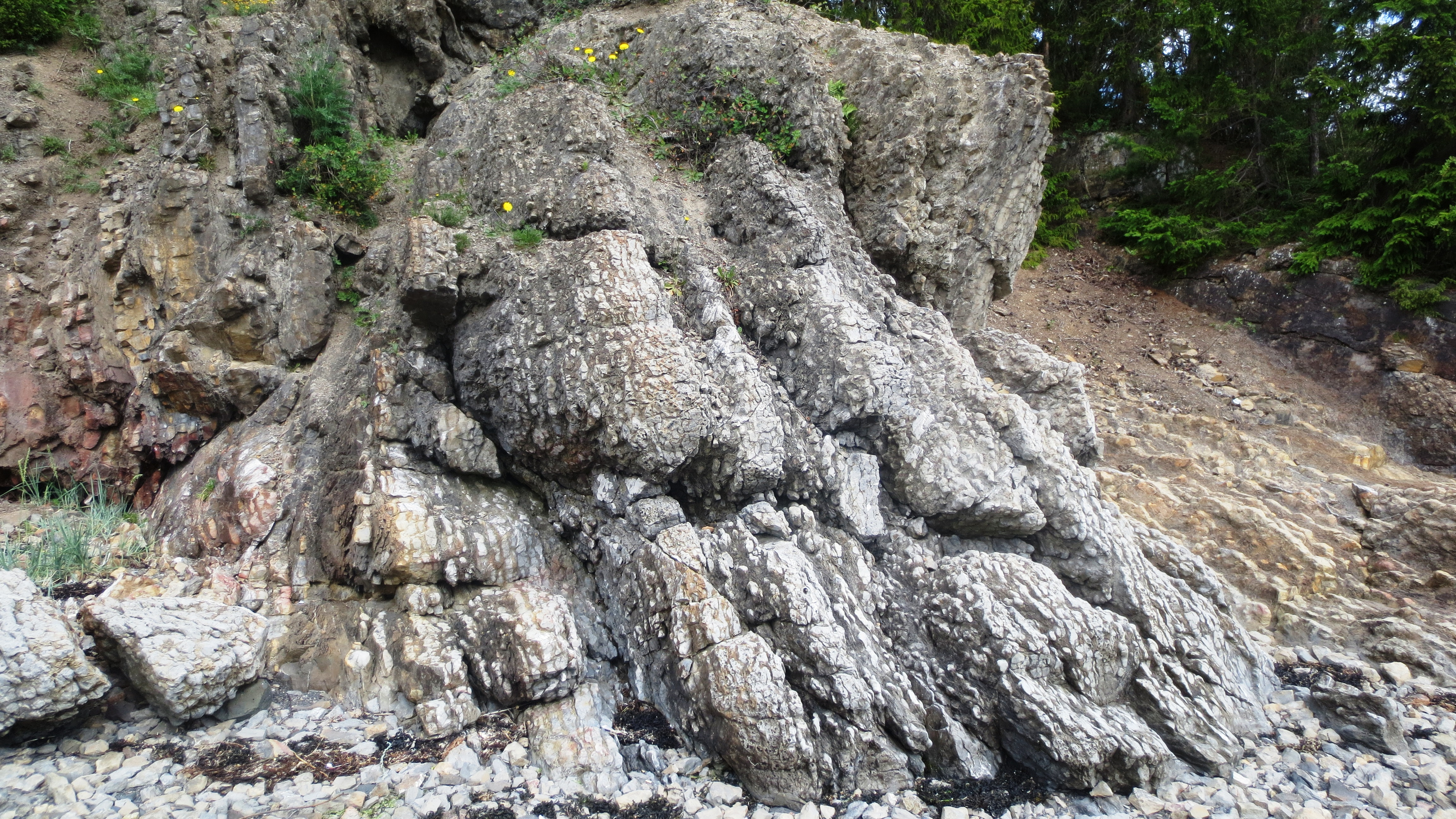
- Langara Formation
- Type: Formation

Lithology
- Primary: Limestone
- Other: Siltstone, shale

Location
- Region: Baerum, Oslo Asker
- Country: Norway

The Langara Formation is a geologic formation in Norway. It preserves fossils dating back to the Katian to Hirnantian (Rawtheyan) stages of the Ordovician period.

== See also ==
- List of fossiliferous stratigraphic units in Norway
