= Eorapax =

Eorapax Temporal range: Early Triassic

Scientific classification
- Kingdom: Animalia
- Phylum: Chordata
- Class: Chondrichthyes
- Subclass: Elasmobranchii
- Genus: †Eorapax
- Species: †E. serrasis

Binomial name
- †Eorapax serrasis Saugen et al., 2025

Extinct genus of neoselachian during the Early Triassic epoch

Eorapax is an extinct genus of neoselachian that lived during the Early Triassic epoch.

== Distribution ==
Fossils of E. serrasis have been found in the Vikinghøgda Formation in Svalbard.
