= Lerbekk Formation =

Geologic formation in Norway

- Stratigraphic range: Devonian
- Type: Formation
- Underlies: Svartberg Conglomerate
- Thickness: 230 m

Lithology
- Primary: Sandstone. siltstone, shale
- Other: Conglomerate

Location
- Region: Sør-Trøndelag
- Country: Norway

The Lerbekk Formation is a geologic formation found in the Røragen Basin in Sør-Trøndelag, Norway. It preserves fossils dating back to the Devonian period.

== See also ==
- List of fossiliferous stratigraphic units in Norway
