= Ramså Formation =

Geologic formation in Norway

- Stratigraphic range: Jurassic
- Type: Formation

Location
- Country: Norway

The Ramså Formation is a geologic formation in Norway. It preserves fossils dating back to the Jurassic period.

== See also ==
- List of fossiliferous stratigraphic units in Norway
