= Vindsalen =

Coordinates: 78.8244°N 26.5563°E

Vindsalen is a mountain pass on Svenskøya in Kong Karls Land, Svalbard. It separates the mountain of Mohnhøgda from Dunérfjellet, rather north on the island, not far from the northernmost point Arnesenodden.
