= De Geerdalen =

Valley of Spitsbergen, Norway

Coordinates: 78.2979°N 16.3667°E

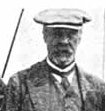
De Geerdalen is named after Swedish geologist Gerard De Geer

De Geerdalen is a valley in Nordenskiöld Land at Spitsbergen, Svalbard. It is named after Swedish geologist and Arctic explorer Gerard De Geer. The mountain pass of Kreklingpasset divides De Geerdalen from Helvetiadalen. The river of De Geerelva flows through the valley, and debouches into Sassenfjorden at Elveneset.

== Geology ==
The valley has given name to the Triassic De Geerdalen Formation, dated from late Carnian to early Norian, which type locality is at the mountain of Botneheia east of the valley.
