= Tschermakfjellet Formation =

Geologic formation in Svalbard, Norway

- Stratigraphic range: Early Carnian; ~235–221.5 Ma
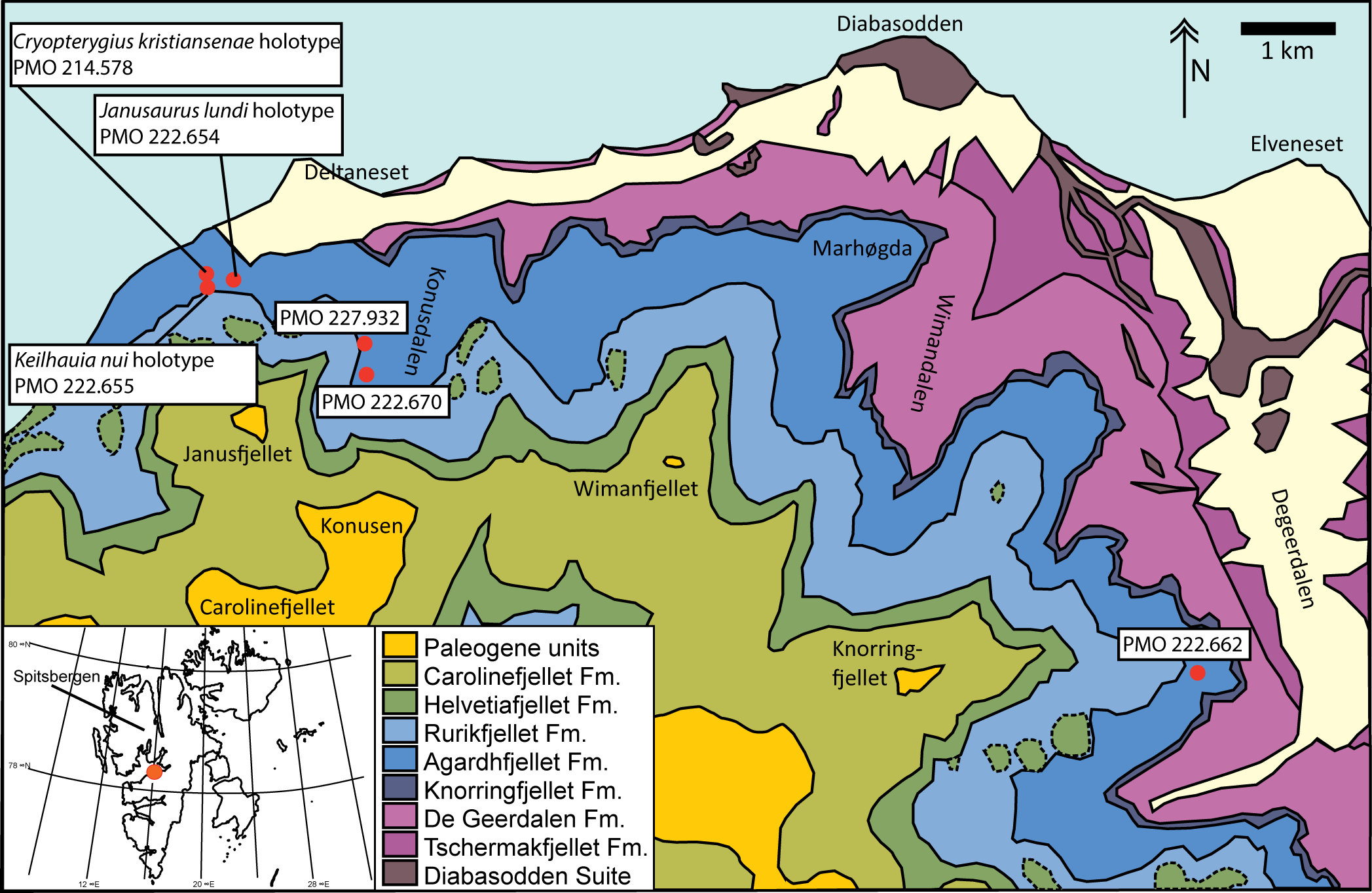
- Geologic map with the formation in darker pink
- Type: Formation
- Unit of: Kapp Toscana Group
- Underlies: De Geerdalen Formation
- Overlies: Sassendalen Group
- Thickness: 63 metres (207 ft) at Tschermakfjellet

Lithology
- Primary: Sandstones and silty shales

Location
- Coordinates: 78.5°N 15.3°E
- Approximate paleocoordinates: 47.4°N 2.1°W
- Region: Svalbard
- Country: Norway

Type section
- Named for: Tschermakfjellet (type section from Botneheia)
- Tschermakfjellet Formation (Svalbard)

The Tschermakfjellet Formation is a geological formation in Svalbard, Norway, a subunit of the Kapp Toscana Group. The formation dates to the Late Triassic (early Carnian).

== Description ==
It is named after the mountain of Tschermakfjellet in Dickson Land at Spitsbergen, while its type section is found at Botneheia in Nordenskiöld Land. The formation has provided fossils of invertebrates and of an indeterminate pistosaurid.
