= Mjösa Limestone =

Geologic formation in Norway

- Stratigraphic range: Ordovician
- Type: Formation

Lithology
- Primary: Limestone

Location
- Country: Norway

The Mjösa Limestone is a geologic formation in Norway. It preserves fossils dating back to the Ordovician period.

== See also ==
- List of fossiliferous stratigraphic units in Norway
