= Kapp Kare Formation =

Carboniferous-aged, fossiliferous geologic formation in Norway

- Stratigraphic range: Carboniferous
- Type: Formation

Location
- Country: Norway

The Kapp Kare Formation is a geologic formation in Norway. It preserves fossils dating back to the Carboniferous period.

== See also ==
- List of fossiliferous stratigraphic units in Norway
