= Hedmark Group =

Geologic formation in Norway

- Stratigraphic range: Neoproterozoic–Cambrian
- Type: Group
- Sub-units: Brøttum Formation, Biskopåsen Formation, Biri Formation, Ring Formation, Moelv Formation, Ekre Formation, Vangsås Formation

Lithology
- Primary: Sandstone
- Other: Tillite, shale, conglomerate

Location
- Region: Innlandet
- Country: Norway

Type section
- Named for: Hedmark

The Hedmark Group is a geologic group that outcrops in Innlandet, Norway. It preserves microfossils of Neoproterozoic age.

== See also ==
- List of fossiliferous stratigraphic units in Norway
