= Ulvebreen =

Glacier in Svalbard, Norway

Coordinates: 78.21°N 18.65°E

Ulvebreen is a glacier in Sabine Land at Spitsbergen, Svalbard. It is named after Arctic explorer Erik Andreas Ulve. The glacier is a tributary to Nordmannsfonna, and debouches into the bay of Dunérbukta.
