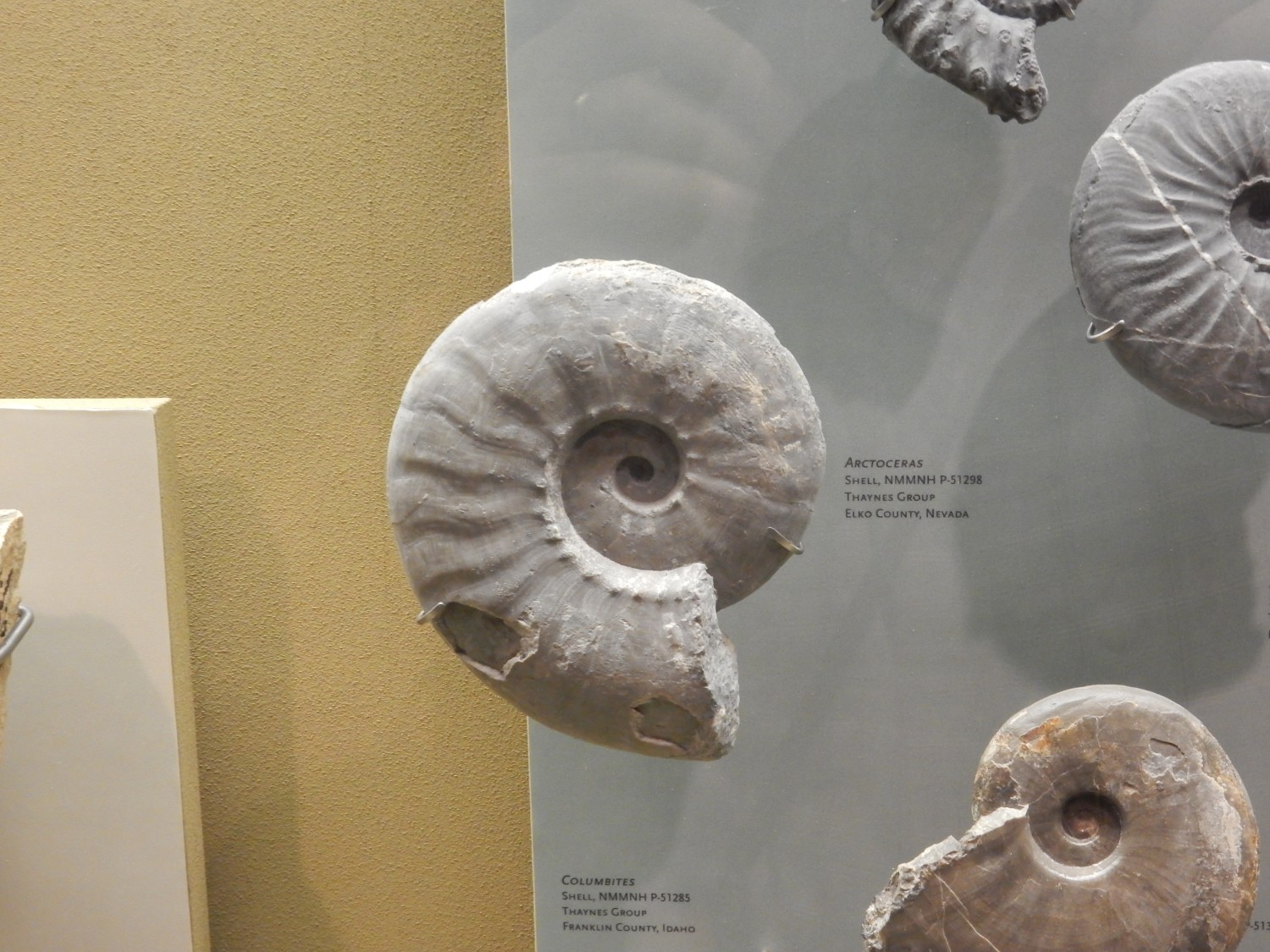
- Fossil of Arctoceras at the New Mexico Museum of Natural History and Science

Scientific classification
- Kingdom: Animalia
- Phylum: Mollusca
- Class: Cephalopoda
- Subclass: †Ammonoidea
- Order: †Ceratitida
- Family: †Arctoceratidae
- Genus: †Arctoceras; Hyatt, 1900

= Arctoceras =

Arctoceras Temporal range: Olenekian

Genus of molluscs (fossil)

Arctoceras is a genus of ceratitid ammonoids from the Lower Triassic with a moderately narrow discoidal shell and ceratitic suture.

== Appearance ==
The shell of Arctoceras is generally involute with compressed whorls that are much higher than wide, flattened sides, narrowly rounded ventral rim, and sutures with wide low saddles and simple serrated lobes.

== Classification ==
Arctoceras was named by Alpheus Hyatt in 1900. The genotype Arctoceras polaris (Mojsisovics, 1865) was described from the Smithian (Early Triassic) of Spitsbergen (Svalbard). Up to seven species were described from the Vikinghøgda Formation of Spitsbergen, though a restudy concluded that only one species, Arctoceras blomstrandi, is valid, with A. blomstrandi var. costatus representing a morphologically divergent end member of the lineage.

Arctoceras is the type genus of the Arctoceratidae which is a family in the Meekocerataceae, a superfamily within the order Ceratitida. Ceratitids are ammonoid cephalopods, mostly from the Triassic but with ancestral forms in the upper Permian. Meekocerataceae sometimes appears as Meekoceratoidea to conform with a recent ruling of the ICZN regarding superfamily endings.

== Occurrence ==
Apart from Svalbard, Arctoceras has also been reported from Canada, the United States, Russia, Australia, Afghanistan, and Malaysia.
