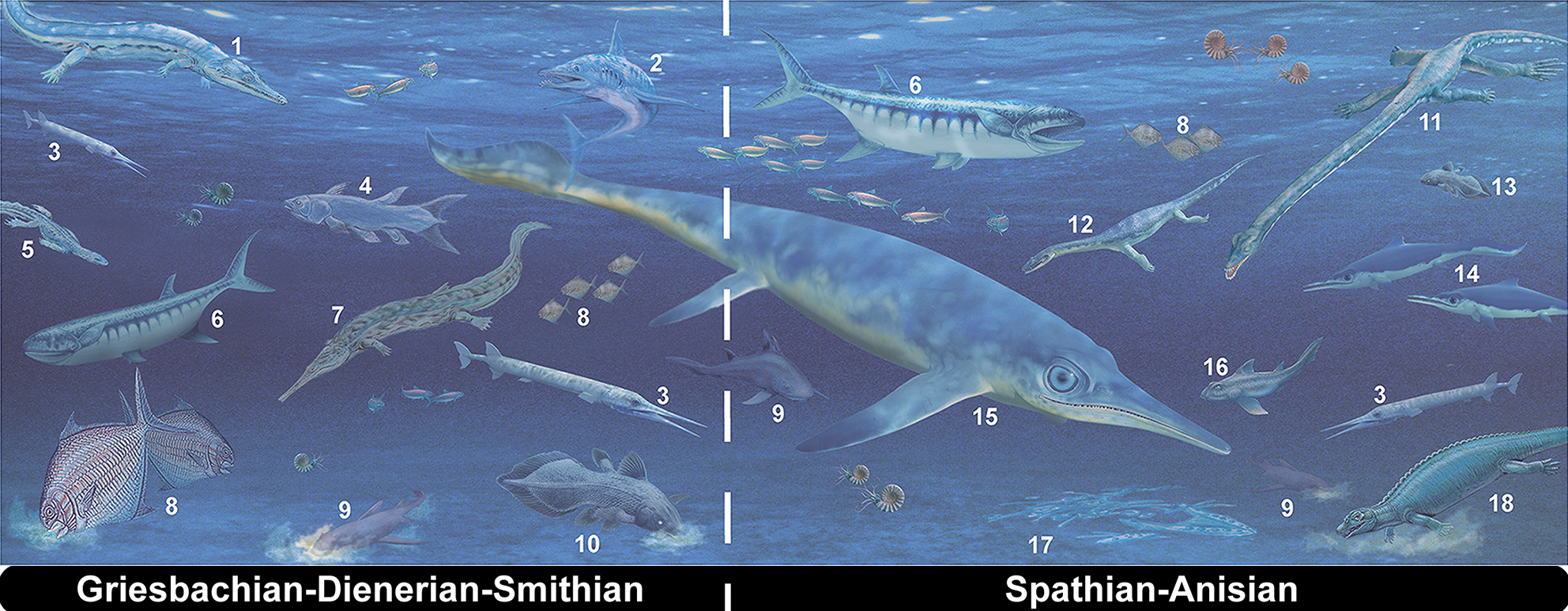
- Mylacanthus (10) and other Triassic marine predators

Scientific classification
- Kingdom: Animalia
- Phylum: Chordata
- Class: Actinistia
- Order: Coelacanthiformes
- Family: †Coelacanthidae
- Genus: †Mylacanthus; Stensiö, 1921

Type species
- †Mylacanthus lobatus Stensiö, 1921

Other species
- †Mylacanthus spinosus Stensiö, 1921

= Mylacanthus =

Mylacanthus Temporal range: early Olenekian

Extinct genus of fishes

Mylacanthus is an extinct genus of prehistoric coelacanth lobe-finned fish that lived during the Smithian (early Olenekian) age of the Early Triassic epoch in what is now Svalbard.

Two species are known, the type species Mylacanthus lobatus and a second species, M. spinosus. The fossils of both of these species were collected from the Lusitaniadalen Member of the Vikinghøgda Formation. Mylacanthus had an estimated body length of 60 cm (24 in) to 80 cm (31 in).

== See also ==
- Sarcopterygii
- List of sarcopterygians
- List of prehistoric bony fish
