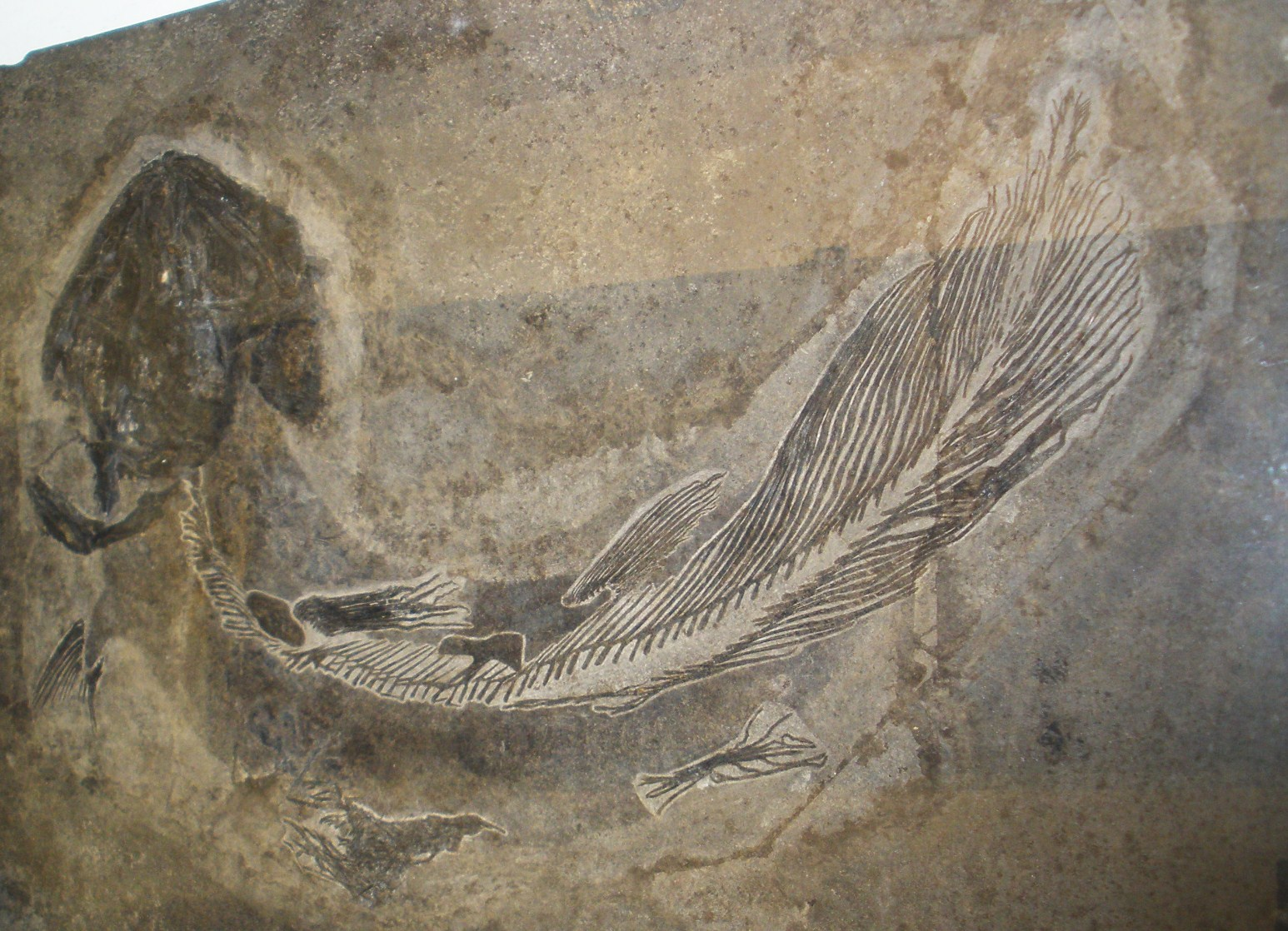
- Coelacanthus granulatus

Scientific classification
- Kingdom: Animalia
- Phylum: Chordata
- Class: Actinistia
- Order: Coelacanthiformes
- Family: †Coelacanthidae; Agassiz, 1843

Genera
- Coelacanthus (type genus); Axelia; Wimania; Indocoelacanthus; Moenkopia; Mylacanthus; Scleracanthus

= Coelacanthidae =

Coelacanthidae Temporal range: Permian–Jurassic

Extinct family of coelacanths

Coelacanthidae is an extinct family of coelacanths found in freshwater and marine strata throughout the world, originating during the Permian, and finally dying out during the Jurassic.

The modern-day genus Latimeria is often erroneously thought to be in this family, when, in fact, it is the type genus of the more advanced family Latimeriidae, which appeared some time during the Triassic.
