= Dracoisen Formation =

Geologic formation in Svalbard, Norway

- Stratigraphic range: Ediacaran
- Type: Formation
- Unit of: Polarisbreen group
- Underlies: Oslobreen Group
- Overlies: Wilsonbreen Formation

Lithology
- Primary: Shale
- Other: Dolomite

Location
- Region: Spitsbergen, Nordaustlandet, Svalbard
- Country: Norway

The Dracoisen Formation is a geologic formation found on the islands of Spitsbergen and Nordaustlandet in Svalbard, Norway. It is Ediacaran (uppermost Neoproterozoic) in age. Microfossils have been found, including Bavinella faveolata and rare acritarchs.

== See also ==
- List of fossiliferous stratigraphic units in Norway
