= Frænkelryggen Formation =

Geologic formation in Svalbard, Norway

- Stratigraphic range: Lochkovian; 413.5–411 Ma
- Type: Formation
- Unit of: Red Bay Group
- Underlies: Ben Nevis Formation
- Overlies: Andréebreen Formation

Lithology
- Primary: Sandstone
- Other: Shale

Location
- Coordinates: 79.7°N 12.5°E
- Approximate paleocoordinates: 6.3°N 17.9°W
- Region: Svalbard
- Country: Norway

Type section
- Named for: Frænkelryggen (583 m (1,913 ft))
- Named by: Kiaer
- Year defined: 1918
- Frænkelryggen Formation (Svalbard)

The Frænkelryggen Formation is a geologic formation in Svalbard, Norway. The fluvial sandstones and green shales preserve flora and early fish fossils dating back to the Lochkovian stage of the Early Devonian period.

== Description ==
Defined at the Frænkelryggen mountain (583 m (1,913 ft)) by Kiaer in 1918, the formation was originally described as Silurian, later dating of the formation provided likely ages between 413.5 and 411 Ma, dating the formation to the Lochkovian stage of the Early Devonian. The formation belongs to the Red Bay Group, conformably overlying the Andréebreen Formation and overlain conformably by the Ben Nevis Formation.

The formation comprises sandstone and green shales deposited in a fluvial environment.

== Fossil content ==
The Frænkelryggen Formation has provided fossils of:

=== Vertebrates ===
- Anglaspis insignis
- Dinaspidella robusta
- Poraspis brevis
- P. polaris
- Machairaspis sp.
- Waengsjoeaspis sp.

=== Flora ===
- Calamospora nigrata
- Cyclogranisporites plicatus
- Emphanisporites minutus
- Granulatisporites muninensis
- Leiotriletes parvus
- Pachytheca cf. fasciculata
- Punctatisporites glabar
- ?Taeniocrada spitsbergensis
- Prototaxites sp.
- ?Zosterophyllum sp.
- Hostinella indet.

== See also ==
- List of fossiliferous stratigraphic units in Norway
