= List of fossiliferous stratigraphic units in Norway =

Fossiliferous stratigraphic units in Norway
Neogene
Paleogene
Late Cretaceous
Early Cretaceous
Jurassic
Triassic
Permian
Carboniferous
Devonian
Silurian
Ordovician
Cambrian
Ediacaran
Fossiliferous stratigraphic units in the Norwegian part of the North Sea
Neogene
Paleogene
Late Cretaceous
Early Cretaceous
Jurassic
Triassic
Permian
Carboniferous
Devonian
Silurian
Ordovician
Cambrian
Ediacaran
Fossiliferous stratigraphic units in Svalbard, Norway
Neogene
Paleogene
Late Cretaceous
Early Cretaceous
Jurassic
Triassic
Permian
Carboniferous
Devonian
Silurian
Ordovician
Cambrian
Ediacaran

Group or Formation	Period	Notes
Hordaland Formation	Paleogene	
Helvetiafjellet Formation - Festningen Sandstone	Barremian	Ichnofossiliferous
Adventdalen Group/Agardhfjellet Formation	Oxfordian (stage)-Berriasian	Lagerstätte
Heather Formation	Mid-Late Jurassic	
Ramså Formation	Jurassic	
Lunde Formation	Rhaetian	
Wilhelmøya Formation	Rhaetian	
Upper Saurian Niveau Formation	Triassic	
Twillingodden Formation	Smithian	
Vardebukta Formation	Induan-Olenekian	
Sassendalen Group - Vikinghøgda Formation	Induan-Olenekian	
Tempelfjorden Group - Kapp Starostin Formation	Permian	
Tempelfjorden Group - Miseryfjellet Formation	Permian	
Kapp Starostin Formation	Permian	
Gippsdalen Group - Hambergfjellet Formation	Permian	
Treskelodden Formation	Gzhelian-Artinskian	
Kapp Duner Formation	Carboniferous	
Kapp Hanna Formation	Carboniferous	
Kapp Kare Formation	Carboniferous	
Wordiekammen Limestone	Carboniferous	
Wijde Bay Formation	Givetian	
Wood Bay Formation	Pragian-Emsian	
Fraenkelryggen Formation	Lochkovian	
Lerbekk Formation	Devonian	
Sundvollen Formation	Gorstian-Ludfordian	
Steinsfjorden Formation	Silurian	
Braksøya Formation	Sheinwoodian	
Bruflat Formation	Telychian	
Rytteraker Formation	Silurian	
Saelabonn Formation	Silurian	
Sjorvoll Formation	Silurian	
Solvik Formation	Silurian	
Vik Formation	Silurian	
Alum Shale	Ordovician	
Arnestad Formation	Ordovician	
Bjørkasholmen Formation	Ordovician	
Bønsnes Formation	Ordovician	
Elnes Formation	Ordovician	
Frognerkilen Formation	Ordovician	
Furuberget Formation	Ordovician	
Grimsøya Formation	Ordovician	
Hovinsholm Formation	Ordovician	
Huk Formation	Ordovician	
Husbergøya Formation	Ordovician	
Kalvsjøen Formation	Ordovician	
Kirtonryggen Formation	Ordovician	
Kullsberg Limestone	Ordovician	
Langara Formation	Ordovician	
Langøyene Formation	Ordovician	
Mjösa Limestone	Ordovician	
Myren Formation	Ordovician	
Nakholmen Formation	Ordovician	
Smoelan Formation	Ordovician	
Solvang Formation	Ordovician	
Steinvika Limestone	Ordovician	
Tetradium Limestone	Ordovician	
Tommarp Formation	Ordovician	
Toyen Formation	Ordovician	
Ullerntangen Formation	Ordovician	
Upper Chasmops Formation	Ordovician	
Upper Furnberg Formation	Ordovician	
Upper Horvin Group - Hovin Sandstone	Ordovician	
Upper Horvin Group - Kalstad Limestone	Ordovician	
Valhallfonna Formation	Ordovician	
Venstøp Formation	Ordovician	
Vollen Formation	Ordovician	
1c ß Formation	Cambrian	
Duolbasgaissa Formation	Cambrian	
Sparagmite Formation	Cambrian Stage 3	
Tokammane Formation	Cambrian	
Breidvika Formation	Cambrian, Ediacaran	
Dracoisen Formation	Ediacaran	
Stáhpogieddi Formation	Ediacaran	
Hedmark Group; Biskopåsen Formation (Biskopas Conglomerate)	Neoproterozoic	

== See also ==
- Lists of fossiliferous stratigraphic units in Europe
  - List of fossiliferous stratigraphic units in Denmark
  - List of fossiliferous stratigraphic units in Scotland
  - List of fossiliferous stratigraphic units in Svalbard
  - List of fossiliferous stratigraphic units in Sweden
