= Bruflat Formation =

Geologic formation in Norway

- Stratigraphic range: Silurian
- Type: Formation

Location
- Country: Norway

The Bruflat Formation is a geologic formation in Norway. It preserves fossils dating back to the Silurian period.

== See also ==
- List of fossiliferous stratigraphic units in Norway
