= Sauriedalen =

Valley of Spitsbergen, Norway

Coordinates: 78.53°N 15.46°E

Sauriedalen is a valley in Dickson Land at Spitsbergen, Svalbard. It has a length of about sixteen kilometers, extending from Njordfjellet and Gyntflya to Tschermakfjellet. The valley is named from fossil Triassic reptiles (sauria), found in the nearby Saurieberget.
