= Ronald L. Myren =

Ronald Lloyd Myren (4 June 1937 – 10 Nov 2003) was a Canadian artist and landscape painter. He was a well known artist in Western Canada (Alberta and British Columbia) who painted mostly in the foothills and mountainous areas of those provinces. He was the Chief Preparator and Registrar, and was in charge of installations at the Edmonton Art Gallery (from 1966 to 1980), now known as the Art Gallery of Alberta (AGA). He was not a religious man in the traditional church sense of the word, and was not baptized. He believed in nature and was often quoted as saying, "Nature is my church." He expressed his belief and feeling about nature through his art. He spent a great deal of time every summer out in the foothills of Alberta painting, taking photos and fishing. He said he was recording scenes of nature that were going to disappear because of logging and development, and in some respects this prediction has come true.

== Education ==
He was born in Galloway, British Columbia in 1937 and attended the Alberta College of Art in Calgary for two years in the early 1960s. Due to finances he did not graduate but continued a quest in the love of learning about art for his entire life.

== Painting ==
Over the course of his career he had 11 solo exhibitions and participated in 23 group exhibitions. He has art in numerous public collections and his work has many private collectors.

Solo exhibitions:

- Downstairs Gallery, Edmonton AB, 1975
- Edmonton Art Gallery, Edmonton AB, 1976
- Downstairs Gallery, Edmonton AB, 1977
- Downstairs Gallery, Edmonton AB, 1979
- Mira Goddard Gallery, Toronto ON, 1981
- Mira Goddard Gallery, Toronto ON, 1982
- Mira Goddard Gallery, Calgary AB, 1982
- Mira Goddard Gallery, Calgary AB, 1983
- Hett Gallery, Edmonton AB, 1983
- Kathleen Laverty Gallery, Edmonton AB, 1990
- Bugara Kmet Gallery Edmonton AB, 1994

Group exhibitions:

- Civic Centennial Exhibition, Edmonton AB, 1967
- Alberta 1973, Edmonton Art Gallery, Edmonton AB, 1973
- Summer '74, Edmonton Art Gallery, Edmonton AB, 1974
- Alberta Realists, Edmonton Art Gallery, Edmonton AB, 1974
- Prairie 74, Painters of The Prairies, Saidye Bonfmon Center, Montreal QB, 1974
- Changing Visions Canadian Landscapes Traveling Exhibition, Edmonton Art Gallery & Art Gallery of Ontario, 1976
- Index 77, 1977
- Ron Myren & Terry Fenton, Canadian Art Galleries, Calgary AB, 1978
- Alberta Collects Alberta Art, Beaver House, Edmonton AB, 1978
- Art Works from the Alberta Art Foundation to Japan, 1979
- The Alberta Landscape, Edmonton Art Gallery, Edmonton AB, 1979
- Horizons West, Shell Travelling Exhibition, 1979
- Painting in Alberta an Historical Survey, Edmonton Art Gallery, Edmonton AB. 1980
- Alberta Culture Exhibition, Beaver House, Edmonton AB. 1980
- The Big Picture, Edmonton Art Gallery, Edmonton AB, 1981
- Fall Opening, Hett Gallery, Edmonton AB, 1983
- Fall Exhibition, Kathleen Laverty Gallery, Edmonton AB, 1986
- Selections from The Edmonton Art Gallery Permanent Collection, McMullen Gallery, University of Alberta, Edmonton AB, 1987
- An Alberta Sense of Place, Selections from the Alberta Arts Foundation at McMullen Gallery, University of Alberta, Edmonton AB, 1987
- Alberta Drawings, Edmonton Art Gallery, Edmonton AB, 1991
- Masterful Drawings, Faculty of Extension, University of Alberta, Edmonton AB, 1993
- The Works Visual Arts Festival, University of Alberta Exhibit, Edmonton AB, 2001
- Work sold at Jasper Park Originals, Jasper Park Lodge AB, 1995–1998
- Out On A Limb, Art Gallery of Alberta, Edmonton AB, Sept. 2011 – Feb. 2012

== Public collections ==
The following is a list of companies and government agencies that have Ron Myren's art in their collections:

- Alberta Arts Foundation (eight paintings)
- Art Gallery of Alberta (seven paintings)
- University of Alberta (four paintings)
- Northern Jubilee Auditorium Art Collection (three paintings)
- Alberta Government Art Collections
- Bank of Nova Scotia
- Canada Council Art Bank
- Canadian Department of External Affairs
- Edmonton Public School Board
- Glenrose Rehabilitation Hospital Edmonton
- Gulf Oil
- Imperial Oil
- Red Deer College
- Richardson Securities
- Seeal-Alcan Ltd.
- Shell Oil
- Trimac Corporation

== Teaching ==
- Edmonton Art Gallery
  - Drawing #1 and #2, 1970–1973
- University of Alberta Extension Dept.
  - Painting #1 and #2, Barrhead, AB, 1981–1982
  - Landscape Painting, Westlock, AB, 1981–1982
  - Pen and Ink Drawing, Camrose, AB, 1981–1982
- Edmonton Art Gallery
  - Painting, 1983–1987
- Ottwell Community League, Friends of Ottwell
  - Painting, 1987–1989
