= Lunde Formation =

Geological formation in Norway

- Stratigraphic range: Rhaetian; ~203–202 Ma
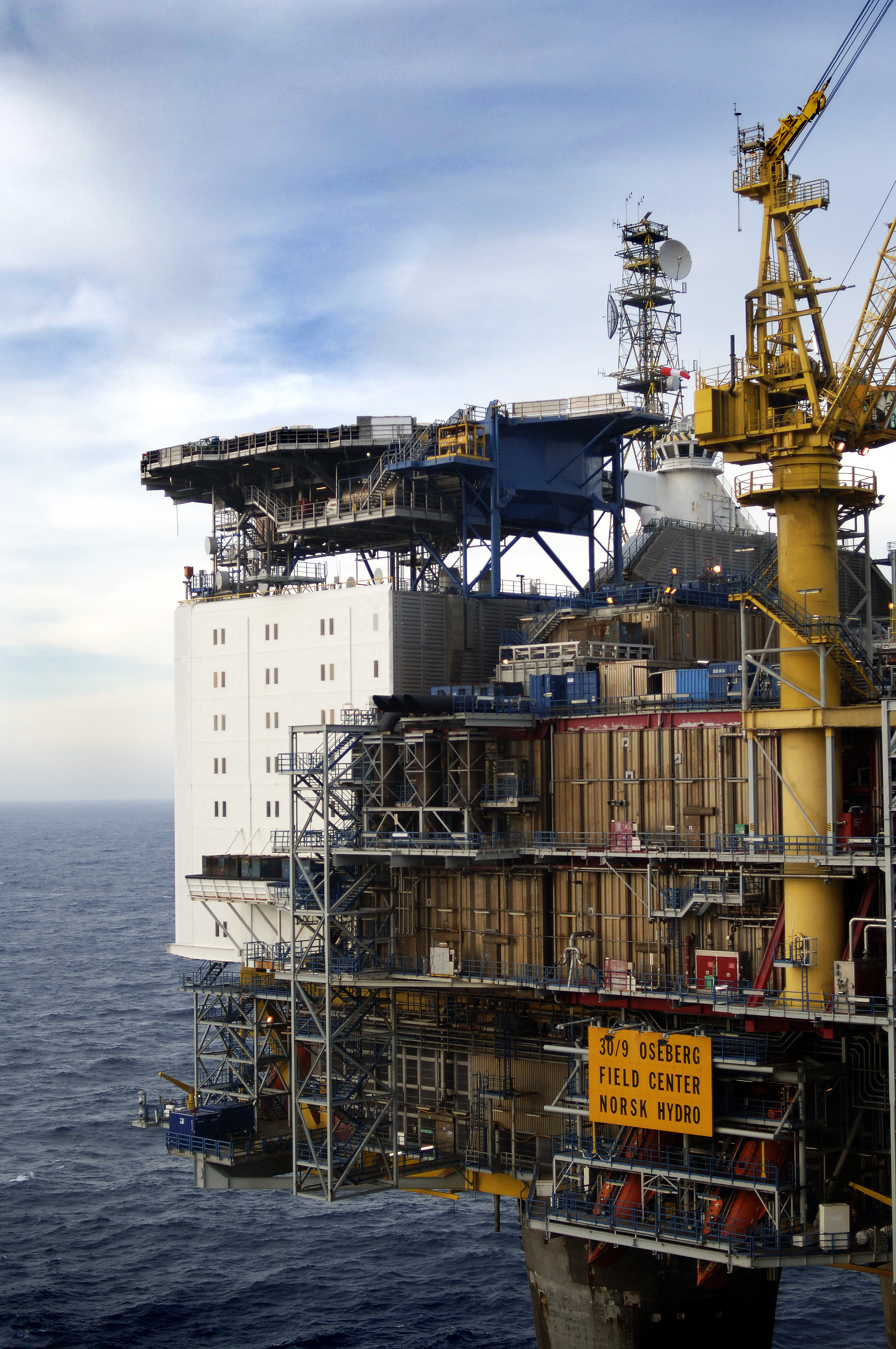
- The formation was drilled by a similar platform to this at Oseberg
- Type: Formation
- Unit of: Keuper/Hegre Group
- Sub-units: Upper and Lower Members
- Underlies: Statfjord Formation
- Overlies: Muschelkalk formations
- Area: Between Shetland Platform and Norwegian mainland

Lithology
- Primary: Mudstone
- Other: Paleosols

Location
- Coordinates: 61.5°N 2.2°E
- Approximate paleocoordinates: 46.2°N 1.3°W
- Region: Snorre Field, North Sea
- Country: Norway; Scotland
- Extent: Northern Viking Graben

Type section
- Named for: Lunde
- Lunde Formation (North Sea)

The Lunde Formation is a geological formation in Norway. The formation was known to preserve fossils of Plateosaurus sp. in the Norwegian offshore (Snorre Field well 34/4-9S), dating back to the Rhaetian period. The formation comprises dry floodplain; paleosol/pedogenic, concretionary, brown, red, calcareous mudstones.

== Description ==
The Lunde Formation occurs in the northern part of a Late Triassic continental basin that covered most of the present North Sea area. Several thousands of meters of fluvial sediments were deposited in this basin during a thermal subsidence phase following Late Permian to Early Triassic rifting.

With an approximate width of 400 kilometres (250 mi) between present mainland Norway and the Shetland Platform, the continental post-rift basin contains the Teist, Lomvi and Lunde Formations, and lasted throughout the Triassic until the final depositional stages of the overlying latest Triassic to Early Jurassic Statfjord Formation, when the whole area was flooded during a marine transgression from the north and south in late Sinemurian to early Pliensbachian times.

The climate during deposition of the Lunde Formation was semiarid and highly seasonal, typical for the contemporary palaeogeographic position at 40-50 degrees North paleolatitude.

The basin was linked to a marine borealic seaway, probably located some tens to hundreds of kilometers to the north and to provenance areas composed of Archean gneisses, Caledonian metamorphic rocks and Devonian sandstones. These sources located on the Shetland Platform and in the southwestern area of Norway and deposited into a vast alluvial plain in the Triassic of what is now the North Sea.

The bone slice of Plateosaurus was discovered during the description of a core retrieved in February 1997 from well 34/4-9S in the north-western part of the Snorre Field. It occurs in a reddish-brown, mudstone interval referred to as the upper member of the Lunde Formation.

The mudstone is composed of dominantly compound and cumulative paleosols that formed in distal to fluvial channels in a floodplain forming the uppermost part of the upper member of the Lunde Formation. The paleosols are characterized by carbonate nodules, pedogenic mud aggregates and slickensides, mottling, root traces and mud cracks. The paleosol type is similar to modern vertisols forming in semi-arid areas with seasonal precipitation, commonly with dry periods lasting 4–8 months. The presence of root traces suggests that the floodplain was covered with small trees and bushes, vegetation suitable for herbivorous animals living on the alluvial plain.

Beds containing the bone specimen belong to the younger of two palynomorph assemblages containing the spore Kreuselisporites reissingeri thought to indicate an early Rhaetian rather than a Norian age, corresponding approximately to an age of 203-202 Ma according to the time scale of Gradstein et al. (2005).

== See also ==
- List of fossiliferous stratigraphic units in Norway
- List of fossiliferous stratigraphic units in Scotland
- Geology of Norway
- Geology of Scotland
- Geology of the North Sea
