= Adventdalen Group =

Geologic group in Norway

- Stratigraphic range: Jurassic
- Type: Group

Location
- Country: Norway

The Adventdalen Group is a geologic group in Norway. It preserves fossils dating back to the Jurassic period.

== See also ==
- List of fossiliferous stratigraphic units in Norway
