= Twillingodden Formation =

Geologic formation in Svalbard, Norway

- Stratigraphic range: Smithian; ~251.3–247.2 Ma
- Type: Formation

Lithology
- Primary: Grainstone

Location
- Coordinates: 76.9°N 16.5°E
- Approximate paleocoordinates: 40.5°N 9.7°E
- Region: Svalbard
- Country: Norway
- Twillingodden Formation (Svalbard)

The Twillingodden Formation is a geologic formation in Svalbard, Norway. It preserves fossils dating back to the Smithian (Early Triassic) period.

== See also ==
- List of fossiliferous stratigraphic units in Norway
