= Kapp Starostin Formation =

Geologic formation in Norway

- Stratigraphic range: Carboniferous-Permian
- Type: Formation

Location
- Region: Svalbard
- Country: Norway

The Kapp Starostin Formation is a geologic formation in Norway. The layers span around 27 million years of the Permian period; and it preserves fossils dating back to the Carboniferous period.

== See also ==
- List of fossiliferous stratigraphic units in Norway
