= Billeberga =

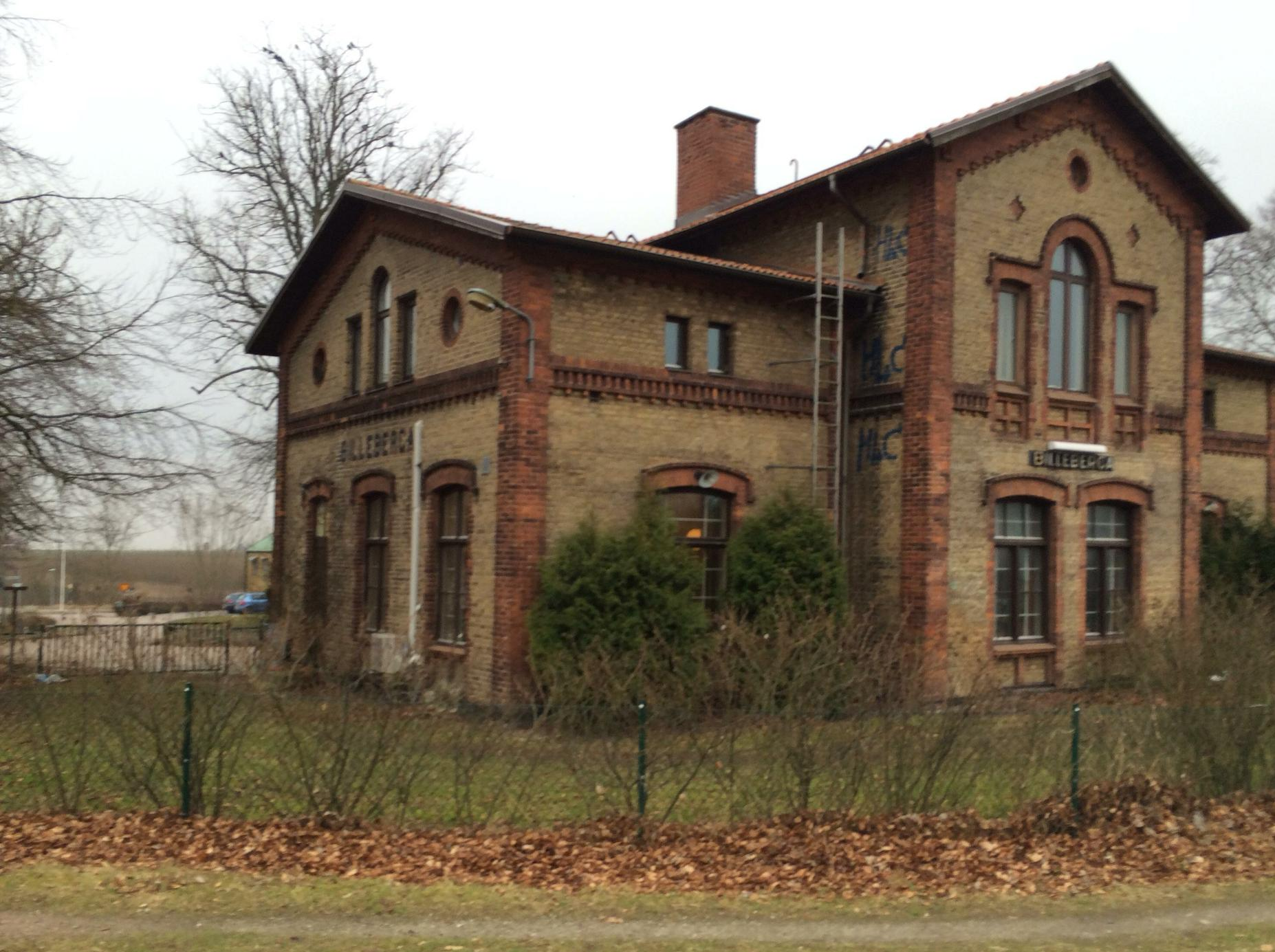
- Billeberga Station

- Location within Skåne Location within Sweden
- Coordinates: 55°53′N 13°00′E
- Country: Sweden
- Province: Skåne
- County: Skåne County
- Municipality: Svalöv Municipality

Area
  - Total: 1.06 km^{2} (0.41 sq mi)

Population (31 December 2010)
  - Total: 987
  - Density: 930/km^{2} (2,400/sq mi)
- Time zone: UTC+1 (CET)
  - Summer (DST): UTC+2 (CEST)

Billeberga is a locality situated in Svalöv Municipality, Skåne County, Sweden with 987 inhabitants in 2010.
