= Botneheia =

Mountain in Spitsbergen, Norway

Coordinates: 78°18′40″N 16°27′38″E

Botneheia is a mountain in Nordenskiöld Land at Spitsbergen, Svalbard. It has a height of 522 m.a.s.l., and is located south of Sassenfjorden, east of the valley of De Geerdalen.

The mountain has given name to the Middle Triassic Botneheia Formation, which is well exposed on the mountain (with type section at Vikinghøgda further east).
