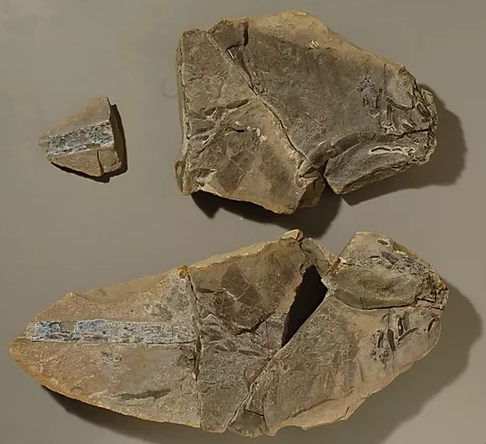
- Early Triassic Palaeobates polaris from Svalbard - picture taken at Paläontologisches Institut und Museum, Universität Zurich

Scientific classification
- Kingdom: Animalia
- Phylum: Chordata
- Class: Chondrichthyes
- Order: †Hybodontiformes
- Family: †Acrodontidae
- Genus: †Palaeobates; Meyer, 1849

Type species
- †Psammodus angustissimus Agassiz in Alberti, 1834

Other species
- †Palaeobates polaris Stensiö, 1921; †P. reticulatus Duffin, 1998; †P. verzilini Nessov & Kaznyshkin, 1988

= Palaeobates =

Palaeobates Temporal range: Triassic

Extinct genus of cartilaginous fishes

Palaeobates is an extinct genus of prehistoric elasmobranchs in the order Hybodontiformes. It lived during the Triassic period. It was a small shark about 1 m (3.3 ft) long. Palaeobates had a grinding-type dentition, which it used to crush hard-shelled prey. The teeth exhibit an orthodont histology.

== Palaeoecology ==
Dental microwear analysis of P. angustissimus confirms that it was a durophagous predator, eating bivalves, gastropods, crustaceans and/or echinoderms.

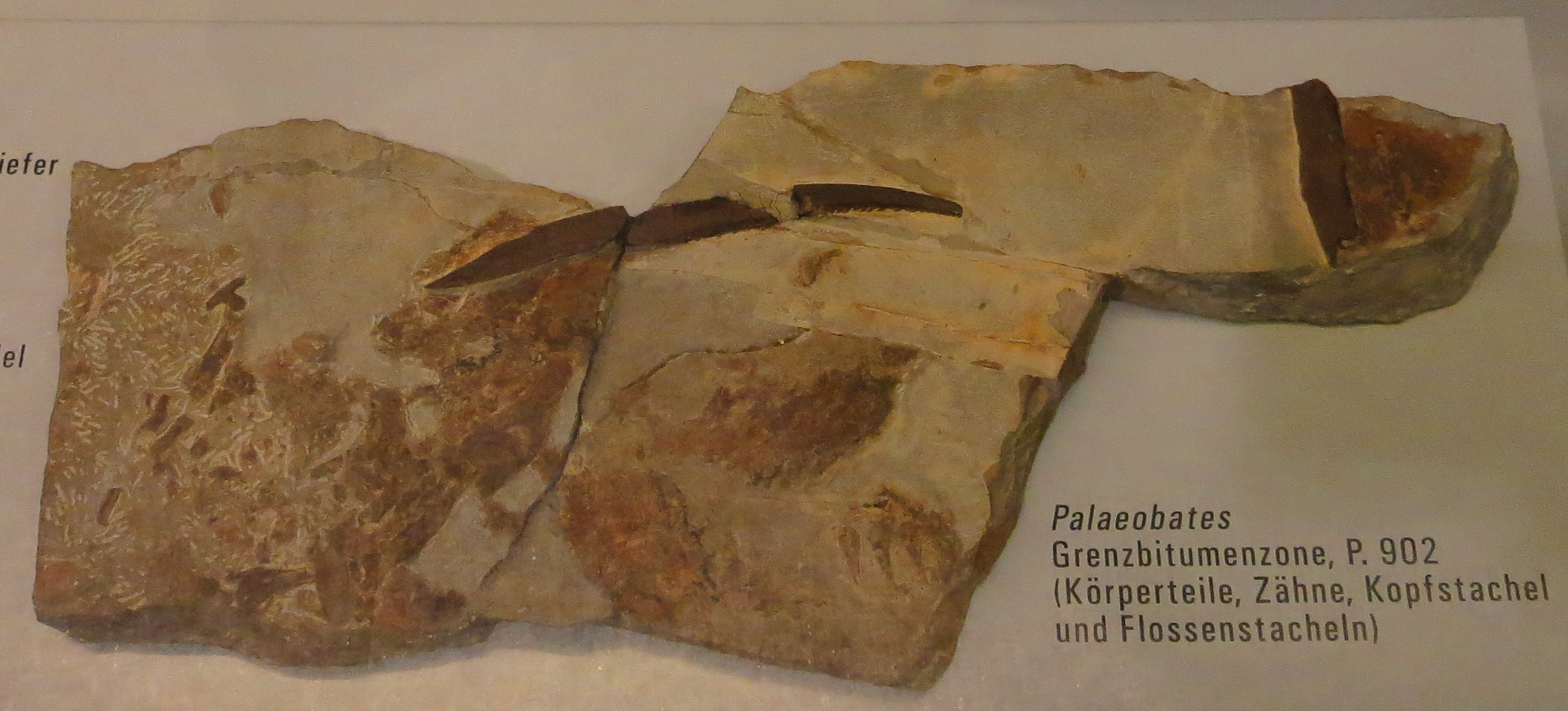
Middle Triassic Palaeobates fossil

== See also ==
- List of prehistoric cartilaginous fish
