= Wilhelmøya Formation =

Geologic formation in Svalbard, Norway

- Stratigraphic range: Rhaetian
- Type: Formation
- Unit of: Kapp Toscana Group

Lithology
- Primary: Sandstone

Location
- Coordinates: 78.9°N 28.2°E
- Approximate paleocoordinates: 64.7°N 10.0°W
- Region: Svalbard
- Country: Norway
- Wilhelmøya Formation (Svalbard)

The Wilhelmøya Formation is a geologic formation in Svalbard, Norway. The marginal marine; concretionary, sideritic sandstones preserve indeterminate ichthyosaur and plesiosaur fossils dating back to the Rhaetian period.

== See also ==
- List of fossiliferous stratigraphic units in Norway
