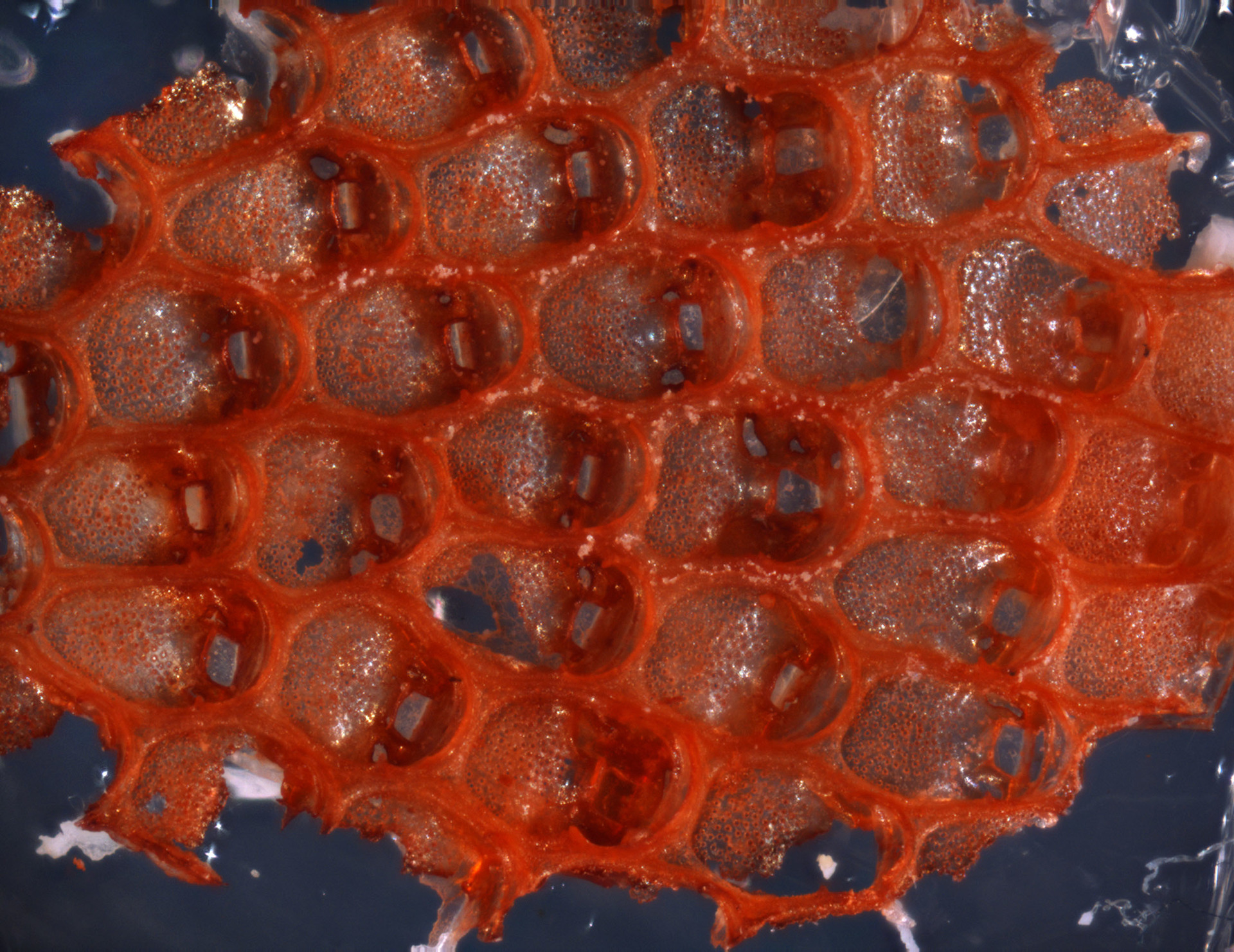

Scientific classification
- Kingdom: Animalia
- Phylum: Bryozoa
- Class: Gymnolaemata
- Order: Cheilostomatida
- Family: Steginoporellidae
- Genus: Steginoporella; Smitt, 1873

Synonyms
- Steganoporella Hincks, 1884

= Steginoporella =

Genus of bryozoans

Steginoporella is a genus of bryozoans belonging to the family Steginoporellidae.

The genus has a cosmopolitan distribution.

== Species ==
The following species are recognised in the genus Steginoporella:

- †Steginoporella alaica Pheophanova, 1965
- †Steginoporella altavillae (Cipolla, 1921)
- Steginoporella alveolata Harmer, 1900
- †Steginoporella arabica Braga & Bahr, 2003
- †Steginoporella asymetrica (Canu, 1907)
- Steginoporella auriculata Harmer, 1900
- Steginoporella bassleri Pouyet & David, 1979
- †Steginoporella bhujensis Guha & Gopikrishna, 2007
- †Steginoporella brevis Canu, 1916
- Steginoporella buskii Harmer, 1900
- †Steginoporella caumontensis Pouyet & David, 1979
- †Steginoporella cavatura Canu, 1916
- †Steginoporella cellariiformis Cheetham, 1963
- †Steginoporella chiplonkari Sonar & Gaikwad, 2013
- †Steginoporella cliftonensis (Maplestone, 1911)
- Steginoporella connexa Harmer, 1900
- Steginoporella cornuta Osburn, 1950
- Steginoporella crassa (Haswell, 1881)
- †Steginoporella crassopora (Canu, 1903)
- †Steginoporella cucullata (Reuss, 1848)
- †Steginoporella cylindrica Ziko, 1985
- †Steginoporella defixa Canu, 1917
- †Steginoporella delicata Ziko, 1985
- †Steginoporella dennanti Maplestone, 1911
- Steginoporella dilatata Harmer, 1926
- Steginoporella discors Gordon, Voje & Taylor, 2017
- †Steginoporella elegans (Milne-Edwards, 1836)
- Steginoporella evelinae Marcus, 1949
- †Steginoporella firma (Reuss, 1869)
- †Steginoporella firma (Canu, 1907)
- †Steginoporella fragilis Dartevelle, 1933
- Steginoporella greavesi Livingstone, 1926
- Steginoporella haddoni Harmer, 1900
- †Steginoporella haidingeri (Reuss, 1848)
- †Steginoporella hexagonalis Cheetham, 1963
- †Steginoporella iberica David & Pouyet, 1972
- †Steginoporella immanis (Canu & Bassler, 1929)
- †Steginoporella incrustans Canu & Bassler, 1920
- †Steginoporella intermedia Buge & David, 1967
- †Steginoporella jacksonica Canu & Bassler, 1920
- Steginoporella jamaicensis Winston & Jackson, 2021
- †Steginoporella laevimarginata Duvergier, 1924
- Steginoporella lateralis MacGillivray, 1895
- Steginoporella lineata Gordon, Voje & Taylor, 2017
- Steginoporella magnifica Harmer, 1900
- Steginoporella magnilabris (Busk, 1854)
- Steginoporella mandibulata Harmer, 1926
- †Steginoporella manzonii David & Pouyet, 1974
- Steginoporella marcusi Livingstone, 1929
- †Steginoporella mathuri Sonar & Gaikwad, 2013
- †Steginoporella mediterranea Pouyet & David, 1979
- Steginoporella modesta Gordon, Voje & Taylor, 2017
- †Steginoporella montenati David & Pouyet, 1972
- †Steginoporella murachbanensis Sonar & Gaikwad, 2013
- Steginoporella neozelanica (Busk, 1861)
- †Steginoporella obtusa Ziko, 1985
- †Steginoporella parvicella Canu & Bassler, 1919
- Steginoporella perplexa Livingstone, 1929
- †Steginoporella pirabensis Barbosa, 1959
- Steginoporella porteri (Maplestone, 1909)
- †Steginoporella reingruberhohensis Zágoršek, 2003
- †Steginoporella rhodanica Buge & David, 1967
- †Steginoporella rhomboidalis Canu & Lecointre, 1927
- Steginoporella simplex Harmer, 1900
- Steginoporella sulcata Harmer, 1900
- †Steginoporella tiara Gordon, Voje & Taylor, 2017
- Steginoporella transversalis (Canu & Bassler, 1928)
- Steginoporella triangularis Amui & Kaselowsky, 2006
- Steginoporella truncata Harmer, 1900
- †Steginoporella tuberculata David & Pouyet, 1974
- Steginoporella tubulosa Harmer, 1900
- †Steginoporella turbarens Canu & Lecointre, 1927
- †Steginoporella vicksburgica Canu & Bassler, 1920
