= Steginoporellidae =

Scientific classification
- Kingdom: Animalia
- Phylum: Bryozoa
- Class: Gymnolaemata
- Order: Cheilostomatida
- Suborder: Thalamoporellina
- Superfamily: Thalamoporelloidea
- Family: Steginoporellidae; Hincks, 1884

Family of bryozoans

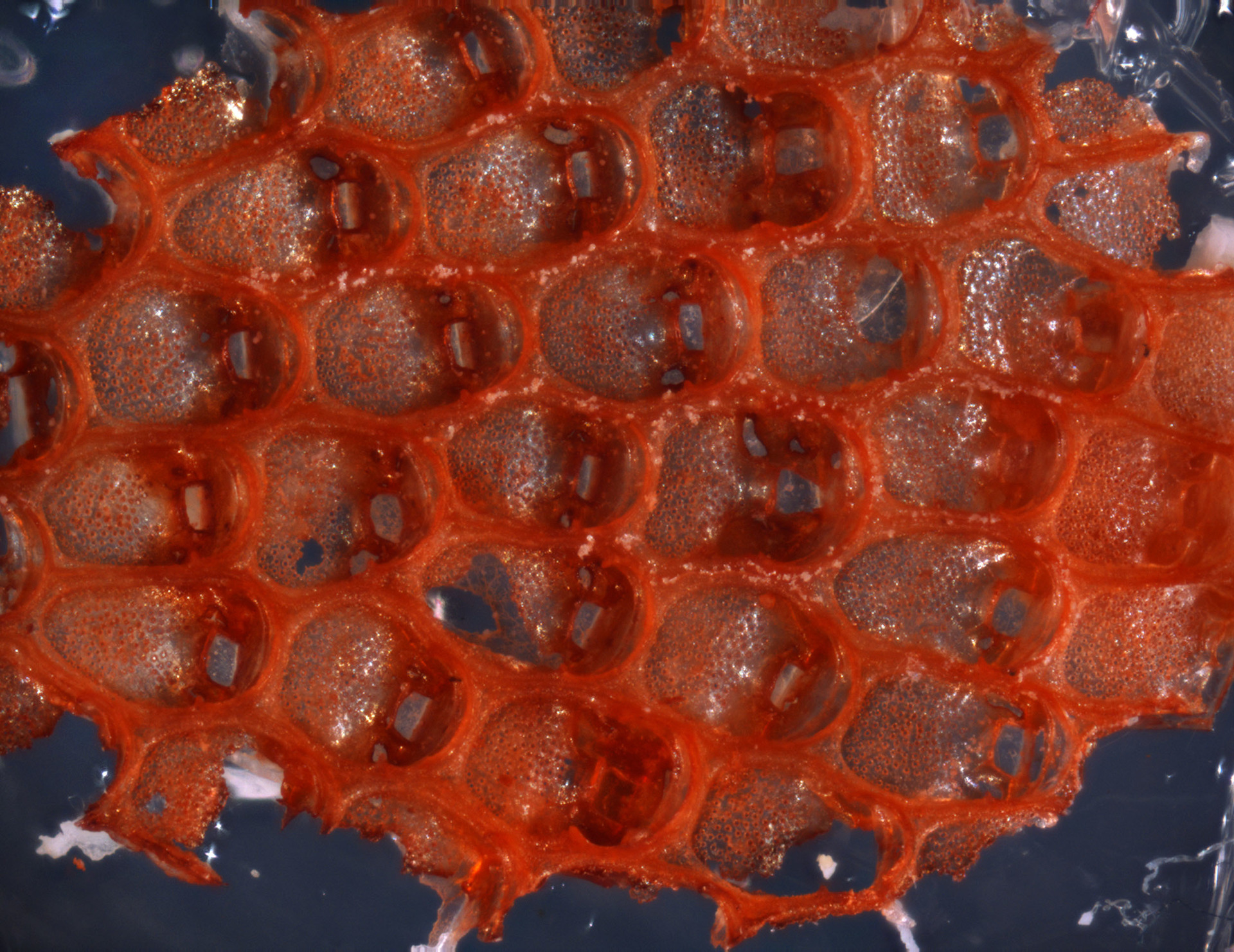
Steginoporella, preserved specimen

Steginoporellidae is a family of bryozoans belonging to the order Cheilostomatida.

== Genera ==
The following genera are recognised in the family Steginoporellidae:

- †Gaudryanella Canu, 1907
- †Gymnophorella Flórez, Di Martino & Ramalho, 2021
- Labioporella Harmer, 1926
- Siphonoporella Hincks, 1880
- Steginoporella Smitt, 1873
