= 2019 in brachiopod paleontology =

Paleontology or palaeontology is the study of prehistoric life forms on Earth through the examination of plant and animal fossils. This includes the study of body fossils, tracks (ichnites), burrows, cast-off parts, fossilised feces (coprolites), palynomorphs and chemical residues. Because humans have encountered fossils for millennia, paleontology has a long history both before and after becoming formalized as a science. This article records significant discoveries and events related to paleontology that occurred or were published in the year 2019.

== Research ==
- A study aiming to reconstruct the life cycle of the Early Cambrian brachiopods is published by Madison & Kuzmina (2019).
- A study on the anatomy of plectambonitoid specimens from the Middle Ordovician of Russia, and on its implications for the knowledge of life cycles of these brachiopods, is published online by Madison & Kuzmina (2019).
- A study on the petrographic and geochemical preservation of Ordovician dalmanelloid shells from the Lexington Formation of Kentucky, Sheguindah Shale of Ontario and the Stony Mountain Formation of Manitoba, aiming to test the hypothesis of paleo-latitudinal zonation of the shelly benthos, is published by Azmy & Jin (2019).
- A study on the phylogenetic relationships among strophomenoid brachiopods and on the biogeographical changes in the strophomenoids through time (focusing on the impact of the Late Ordovician mass extinction on the evolutionary history of strophomenoids) is published by Congreve, Krug & Patzkowsky (2019).
- A study on the internal structure of the shell of Semiplanella carinthica is published by Pakhnevich (2019), who names a new tribe Semiplanellini in the subfamily Gigantoproductinae.
- A study on the diet of species of Gigantoproductus from the Viséan of Derbyshire (United Kingdom), and on its implications for the knowledge of mechanisms that enabled those brachiopod species to reach large sizes, is published by Angiolini et al. (2019).
- A study on the relative importance of brachiopods and bivalves in the fossil assemblages from the Carboniferous Pennsylvanian Breathitt Formation of Kentucky is published by Hsieh, Bush & Bennington (2019).
- Description of a specimen of a Permian brachiopod species Spiriferella protodraschei bearing ventrally directed spiralia (lophophore-supporting, coiled internal structures), and a study on the morphology of these structures and their implications for the knowledge of the feeding system of this brachiopod, is published by Lee et al. (2019).
- A study on the evolution of the body size of brachiopods from the Late Permian to the Middle Triassic, as indicated by brachiopod specimens from South China, is published by Chen et al. (2019).
- A study on the biogeography of Pliensbachian brachiopods in western Tethys Ocean is published online by Vörös & Escarguel (2019).
- A study on changes in the body size of benthic marine brachiopods and bivalves from the Lusitanian Basin (Portugal) before the Toarcian oceanic anoxic event is published by Piazza et al. (2019).
- A study on the impact of the early Toarcian extinction event on fossil brachiopods and bivalves known from the Iberian Range (Spain) is published by Danise et al. (2019).

== New taxa ==
Name	Novelty	Status	Authors	Age	Type locality	Country	Notes	Images
Aegiria apta	Sp. nov	Valid	Huang et al.	Silurian (Rhuddanian)	Zhangwan Formation	China		
Alaskorhynchus	Gen. et sp. nov	Valid	Baranov & Blodgett	Devonian (Pragian)	Soda Creek Limestone	United States	A member of Rhynchonellida belonging to the family Eatoniidae. The type species is A. sodacreekensis.	
Angustothyris dagysi	Sp. nov	Valid	Guo, Chen & Harper	Middle Triassic (Anisian)	Qingyan Formation	China		
Angustothyris qingyanensis	Sp. nov	Valid	Guo, Chen & Harper	Middle Triassic (Anisian)	Qingyan Formation	China	Subsequently transferred to the genus Qianothyris.	
Anidanthus parvimucronata	Nom. nov	Valid	He & Shen in He et al.	Permian (Changhsingian)	Talung Formation	China	A member of Productida belonging to the family Linoproductidae and the subfamily Anidanthinae; a replacement name for Anidanthus mucronata He & Shen in He et al. (2005).	
Anidanthus subquadratus	Sp. nov	Valid	He, Shi & Shen in He et al.	Permian (Changhsingian)		China	A member of Productida belonging to the family Linoproductidae and the subfamily Anidanthinae.	
Aporthophyla prisca	Sp. nov	Valid	Cocks & Popov	Early Ordovician		United Kingdom		
Arcullina? enokiani	Sp. nov	Valid	Lee & Shi in Lee et al.	Permian (Kungurian)	Kozhim Formation; Kozhim Rudnik Formation	Russia	A member of Spiriferida belonging to the family Spiriferellidae.	
Askerina	Gen. et sp. nov	Valid	Baarli	Ordovician (Hirnantian) and Silurian (Aeronian)	Solvik	Norway	A member of the family Atrypidae. The type species is A. cymbula. Announced in 2019; the final version of the article naming was published in 2021.	
Aulacothyris stevensi	Sp. nov	Valid	MacFarlan	Early Jurassic (Aratauran)	Diamond Peak Group	New Zealand	A member of Terebratulida belonging to the family Zeilleriidae.	
Aulonotreta neptuni	Sp. nov	Valid	Holmer et al.	Ordovician (Darriwilian )		Sweden	A member of Lingulida belonging to the family Aulonotretidae.	
Australocoelia boucoti	Sp. nov	Valid	De Rezende, Machado & Ponciano	Devonian		Brazil		
Austriellula iordanae	Sp. nov	Valid	Gaetani in Grădinaru & Gaetani	Triassic		Romania	A member of Rhynchonellida belonging to the family Norellidae and the subfamily Norellinae.	
Bellistrophia	Gen. et comb. nov	Valid	Holmer et al.	Cambrian	Atei Formation; Meagher Formation	Kazakhstan; United States	A member of Kutorginida. The type species is "Nisusia" deissei Bell (1941); genus also includes "Nisusia" montanensis Bell (1941).	
Bernousia	Gen. et sp. nov	Valid	Gourvennec	Paleozoic	Tindouf Basin	Algeria	A member of Spiriferida. Genus includes new species B. brevedorsata.	
Biernatia rhapsody	Sp. nov	Valid	Lavié, Serra & Feltes	Middle and Late Ordovician	Las Aguaditas Formation; Las Chacritas Formation	Argentina	A member of Acrotretida belonging to the family Biernatidae.	
Borellithyris	Gen. et sp. nov	Valid	Dulai	Miocene (Tortonian)	Sant'Agata Fossili Formation	Italy	A member of Terebratulida belonging to the family Megathyrididae. The type species is B. gaetanii.	
Cathaysiorthis xichuanensis	Sp. nov	Valid	Huang et al.	Silurian (Rhuddanian)	Zhangwan Formation	China		
Caucasorhynchella	Gen. nov	Valid	Guo, Chen & Harper	Middle Triassic (Anisian)		China		
Chonosteges cooperi	Sp. nov	Valid	Torres-Martínez et al.	Permian	Paso Hondo Formation	Mexico		
Cleiothyridina pfaffenbergensis	Sp. nov	Valid	Mottequin et al.	Carboniferous (Tournaisian)	Gleitsch Formation	Germany	A member of Athyridida belonging to the family Athyrididae.	
"Clorinda" symmetrica	Sp. nov	Valid	Cocks	Silurian (Llandovery)		United Kingdom		
Conotreta andina	Sp. nov	Valid	Lavié, Serra & Feltes	Ordovician (Darriwilian)	Las Aguaditas Formation; Las Chacritas Formation	Argentina	A member of Acrotretida belonging to the family Acrotretidae.	
Coolinia diabolica	Sp. nov	Valid	Cocks	Silurian (Llandovery)		United Kingdom		
Cordatia	Gen. et sp. nov	Valid	Brock & Claybourn in Betts et al.	Early Cambrian		Australia	A member of Paterinata possibly belonging to the family Paterinidae. The type species is C. erinae.	
Craniops popovi	Sp. nov	Valid	Cocks	Silurian (Llandovery)		United Kingdom		
Crassispirifer galinae	Sp. nov	Valid	Manankov	Permian		Mongolia	A member of Spiriferida.	
Crassumbo germanicus	Sp. nov	Valid	Mottequin et al.	Carboniferous (Tournaisian)	Gleitsch Formation	Germany	A member of Spiriferida belonging to the family Crassumbidae.	
Cyrtia wrekinensis	Sp. nov	Valid	Cocks	Silurian (Llandovery)		United Kingdom		
Cyrtina evanescens	Sp. nov	Valid	Gourvennec	Paleozoic	Tindouf Basin	Algeria	A member of Spiriferinida.	
Cyrtospirifer aouinetensis	Sp. nov	Valid	Gourvennec	Paleozoic	Tindouf Basin	Algeria		
Cyrtospirifer (Elasmospirifer)	Subgen. et sp. nov	Valid	Gourvennec	Paleozoic	Tindouf Basin	Algeria	The subgenus includes new species C. (E.) djebiletensis.	
Cyrtospirifer robardeti	Sp. nov	Valid	Gourvennec	Paleozoic	Tindouf Basin	Algeria		
Dictyothyropsis vogli	Sp. nov	Valid	Bujtor & Vörös	Early Cretaceous		Hungary		
Dihelictera askeriensis	Sp. nov	Valid	Baarli	Ordovician (Hirnantian) and Silurian (Aeronian)	Solvik	Norway	A member of the family Atrypidae. Announced in 2019; the final version of the article naming was published in 2021.	
Dinobolus athelstani	Sp. nov	Valid	Cocks	Silurian (Llandovery)		United Kingdom		
Eleutherokomma djezairensis	Sp. nov	Valid	Gourvennec	Paleozoic	Tindouf Basin	Algeria	A member of Spiriferida.	
Eospirifer majesticus	Sp. nov	Valid	Cocks	Silurian (Llandovery)		United Kingdom		
Erbotreta elankii	Sp. nov	Valid	Ushatinskaya & Korovnikov	Cambrian		Russia	A member of Acrotretida.	
Eucalathis giulioi	Sp. nov	Valid	Dulai	Miocene (Tortonian)	Sant'Agata Fossili Formation	Italy	A member of Terebratulida belonging to the family Chlidonophoridae.	
Farewellirhynchia	Gen. et sp. nov	Valid	Baranov & Blodgett	Devonian (Pragian)	Soda Creek Limestone	United States	A member of Rhynchonellida belonging to the subfamily Leiorhynchinae. The type species is F. kulkovi.	
Fascistropheodonta? wiltzensis	Sp. nov	Valid	Jansen	Early Devonian	Wiltz Formation	Germany; Luxembourg	A member of the family Strophodontidae.	
Felsithyris	Gen. et sp. nov	Valid	Mottequin & Weyer	Carboniferous (Mississippian)		Germany	A member of Spiriferida. The type species is F. hercynica.	
Garciaalcaldia	Gen. et sp. nov	Valid	Baranov & Blodgett	Devonian (Pragian)	Soda Creek Limestone	United States	A member of Rhynchonellida belonging to the subfamily Glossinunilinae. The type species is G. alaskensis.	
Ghorispirifer	Gen. et comb. nov	Valid	Mottequin & Brice	Devonian (Famennian)		Afghanistan; Iran; Iraq	A Cyrtiopsinae. The type species is "Cyrtiopsis graciosa" chakhaensis Brice (1971) (raised to the rank of a separate species G. chakhaensis), genus also includes "Cyrtiopsis" lapparenti Brice (1971).	
Hedeinopsis africana	Sp. nov	Valid	Gourvennec	Paleozoic	Tindouf Basin	Algeria	A member of Spiriferida.	
Howellella minsterleyensis	Sp. nov	Valid	Cocks	Silurian (Llandovery)		United Kingdom		
Ingentistrophia	Gen. et comb. nov	Valid	Jansen	Early Devonian	Katzenelnbogen Formation Seifen Formation	Belgium; Germany	A member of Orthotetida belonging to the family Areostrophiidae. The type species is "Orthothethes" ingens Drevermann (1904).	
Jonesea oepiki	Sp. nov	Valid	Cocks	Silurian (Llandovery)		United Kingdom		
Jordanithyris	Gen. et sp. nov	Valid	Feldman et al.	Middle Jurassic (Bathonian and Callovian)	Hamam; Mughanniyya	Jordan	A member of Terebratulida. Genus includes new species J. ardainensis. Announced in 2019; the final version of the article naming it was published in 2021.	
Joviatrypa nakremi	Sp. nov	Valid	Baarli	Silurian (Aeronian)	Solvik	Norway	A member of the family Atrypidae. Announced in 2019; the final version of the article naming was published in 2021.	
Judinica	Gen. et 2 sp. et comb. nov	Valid	Oleneva	Devonian		Belgium; Russia	A member of Spiriferida belonging to the family Adolfiidae. The type species is J. siratchoica; genus also includes new species J. pseudodeflexa, as well as J. pseudomultifida (Vandercammen, 1955), J. biverrucosa (Vandercammen, 1955) and J. solita (Ljaschenko, 1959).	
Koeveskallina bifurcata	Sp. nov	Valid	Guo, Chen & Harper	Middle Triassic (Anisian)	Qingyan Formation	China		
Kosoidea australis	Sp. nov	Valid	Zabini et al.	Ordovician (Hirnantian)	Iapó Formation; Vila Maria Formation	Brazil	A member of Discinoidea.	
Kutchithyris simoni	Sp. nov	Valid	Feldman et al.	Middle Jurassic (Callovian)	Mughanniyya	Jordan	Announced in 2019; the final version of the article naming it was published in 2021.	
Lingulipora budili	Sp. nov	Valid	Mergl	Middle Devonian	Srbsko Formation	Czech Republic	A member of the family Lingulidae.	
Linnarssonia ulakhani	Sp. nov	Valid	Ushatinskaya & Korovnikov	Cambrian		Russia	A member of Acrotretida.	
Linoporella maxima	Sp. nov	Valid	Cocks	Silurian (Llandovery)		United Kingdom		
Loboidothyris fordycei	Sp. nov	Valid	MacFarlan	Early Jurassic (Lower Aratauran to Upper Ururoan)		New Caledonia; New Zealand	A member of Terebratulida belonging to the family Loboidothyrididae.	
Lobothyris simesi	Sp. nov	Valid	MacFarlan	Early Jurassic (Aratauran to Ururoan)		New Zealand	A member of Terebratulida belonging to the family Lobothyrididae.	
Martinia georgei	Sp. nov	Valid	Tazawa in Tazawa, Osawa & Nagura	Carboniferous (Viséan–Bashkirian)	Karaumedate Formation	Belgium; China; Japan; Kazakhstan; Russia; United Kingdom	A member of Spiriferida belonging to the family Martiniidae.	
Martinia liuqiaoiensis	Sp. nov	Valid	He, Shi & Shen in He et al.	Permian (Changhsingian)	Talung Formation	China	A member of Spiriferida belonging to the family Martiniidae.	
Menarhynchus	Gen. et sp. nov	Valid	Baranov & Blodgett	Devonian (Pragian)	Soda Creek Limestone	United States	A member of Rhynchonellida belonging to the subfamily Sphaerirhynchinae. The type species is M. kuskokwimensis.	
Micromartinia	Gen. et sp. nov	Junior homonym	He & Weldon in He et al.	Permian (Changhsingian)	Talung Formation	China	A member of Spiriferida belonging to the superfamily Martinioidea. The type species is M. kwangsiella. The generic name is preoccupied by Micromartinia Amsel (1957).	
Minutomarginifera	Nom. nov	Valid	He et al.	Carboniferous and Permian		China; Thailand	A member of Strophalosiidina belonging to the family Chonopectidae; a replacement name for Eileenella Racheboeuf in Wongwanich et al. (2004).	
Minutomena missa	Sp. nov	Valid	Huang et al.	Ordovician (Hirnantian)	Kuanyinchiao Beds	China		
Multispirifer kropotkini	Sp. nov	Valid	Gourvennec	Paleozoic	Tindouf Basin	Algeria	A member of Spiriferida.	
Neocyrtina xui	Sp. nov	Valid	Guo, Chen & Harper	Middle Triassic (Anisian)	Qingyan Formation	China		
Neoliothyrina nakremi	Sp. nov	Valid	Bitner in Hryniewicz et al.	Late Paleocene	Basilika Formation	Norway	A member of Terebratulida belonging to the family Sellithyridae.	
Neoplatystrophia paludis	Sp. nov	Valid	Cocks	Silurian (Llandovery)		United Kingdom		
Neospirifer borealis	Sp. nov	Valid	Manankov	Permian		Mongolia	A member of Spiriferida.	
Nisusia multicostata	Sp. nov	Valid	Holmer et al.	Cambrian (Drumian)	Mila Formation	Iran	A member of Kutorginida.	
Nottina	Gen. et sp. nov	Valid	Baarli	Silurian (Rhuddanian and Aeronian)	Solvik	Norway	A member of the family Atrypidae. The type species is N. phalerata. Announced in 2019; the final version of the article naming was published in 2021.	
Nucleospira elgari	Sp. nov	Valid	Cocks	Silurian (Llandovery)		United Kingdom		
Nudirostralina minuta	Sp. nov	Valid	Guo, Chen & Harper	Middle Triassic (Anisian)	Qingyan Formation	China		
Opsiconidion nanus	Sp. nov	Valid	Mergl	Devonian (Eifelian)	Acanthopyge Limestone	Czech Republic	A member of Acrotretoidea belonging to the family Biernatidae.	
Oretanomena	Gen. et sp. nov.	Valid	Reyes-Abril, Villas & Gutierrez-Marco	Ordovician (Darriwilian)		Spain	A member of Strophomenoidea. Genus includes new species O. meloui.	
Ortarhynchia	Gen. et sp. nov	Valid	Gaetani in Grădinaru & Gaetani	Triassic		Romania	A member of Rhynchonellida belonging to the family Norellidae and the subfamily Paranorellininae. The type species is O. petersi.	
Pachyschizophoria amygdalina	Sp. nov	Valid	Jansen	Early Devonian	Berlé Formation; Emsquarzit Formation; Hohenrhein Formation	Germany; Luxembourg	A member of Enteletoidea belonging to the family Schizophoriidae.	
Parabrekia	Gen. et sp. nov	Valid	Guo, Chen & Harper	Middle Triassic (Anisian)	Qingyan Formation	China	Genus includes new species P. yangi.	
Paurorthis? llangynogensis	Sp. nov	Valid	Cocks & Popov	Early Ordovician		United Kingdom		
Pentameroides johnsoni	Sp. nov	Valid	Cocks	Silurian (Llandovery)		United Kingdom		
Permorhipidomella	Gen. et sp. nov	Valid	He, Shi & Shen in He et al.	Permian (Changhsingian)		China	A member of Orthida belonging to the family Rhipidomellidae. Genus includes new species P. ovatus.	
Piarorhynchella kittli	Sp. nov	Valid	Gaetani in Grădinaru & Gaetani	Triassic		Romania	A member of Rhynchonellida belonging to the family Norellidae and the subfamily Holcorhynchellinae.	
Platytrochalos (Salopicoelia) morrellswoodensis	Subgen. et sp. nov	Valid	Cocks	Silurian (Llandovery)		United Kingdom		
Productina saalfeldensis	Sp. nov	Valid	Mottequin et al.	Carboniferous (Tournaisian)	Gleitsch Formation; Hangenberg Limestone	Germany	A member of Productida belonging to the family Productellidae.	
Ptychomentzelia dobrogeana	Sp. nov	Valid	Gaetani in Grădinaru & Gaetani	Triassic		Romania	A member of Spiriferida belonging to the family Mentzeliidae.	
Ptychomentzelia simionescui	Sp. nov	Valid	Gaetani in Grădinaru & Gaetani	Triassic		Romania	A member of Spiriferida belonging to the family Mentzeliidae.	
Quiringites bitami	Sp. nov	Valid	Gourvennec	Paleozoic	Tindouf Basin	Algeria	A member of Spiriferida.	
Rhipidomella parvula	Sp. nov	Valid	He, Shi & Shen in He et al.	Permian (Changhsingian)		China	A member of Orthida belonging to the family Rhipidomellidae.	
Roemerithyris	Gen. et comb. nov	Valid	Mottequin & Weyer	Carboniferous (Mississippian)		Germany	A member of Spiriferida. The type species is "Spirifer" macrogaster Roemer (1852).	
Rugithyris hasibuani	Sp. nov	Valid	MacFarlan	Early Jurassic (Upper Ururoan)		New Zealand	A member of Terebratulida belonging to the superfamily Loboidothyridoidea.	
Rutorhynchia? trigonalis	Sp. nov	Valid	Guo, Chen & Harper	Middle Triassic (Anisian)	Qingyan Formation	China		
Schachriomonia spiraensis	Sp. nov	Valid	Baarli	Ordovician-Silurian	Solvik	Norway	A member of the family Atrypidae. Announced in 2019; the final version of the article naming was published in 2021.	
Schellwienella justinianoi	Sp. nov	Valid	Rezende, Ponciano & Brett	Late Devonian	Longá Formation	Brazil		
Sellithyris elizabetha	Sp. nov	Valid	Rojas & Sandy	Early Cretaceous (Valanginian)	Rosablanca Formation	Colombia		
Septatrypa salopiensis	Sp. nov	Valid	Cocks	Silurian (Llandovery)		United Kingdom		
Shelvothyris	Gen. et comb. nov	Valid	Cocks	Silurian (Llandovery)		United Kingdom	Genus includes S. furcata (Sowerby, 1839)	
Sifella	Gen. et sp. nov	Valid	Baarli	Silurian (Aeronian)	Solvik	Norway	A member of the family Atrypidae. The type species is S. patera. Announced in 2019; the final version of the article naming was published in 2021.	
Skenidoides pontyfennensis	Sp. nov	Valid	Cocks & Popov	Early Ordovician		United Kingdom		
Smirnovina ferraria	Sp. nov	Valid	Bujtor & Vörös	Early Cretaceous		Hungary		
Spiriferella protodraschei	Sp. nov	Valid	Lee & Shi in Lee et al.	Permian (late Artinskian–early Kungurian)	Kapp Starostin Formation	Norway	A member of Spiriferida belonging to the family Spiriferellidae.	
Tamarirhynchia	Gen. et comb. nov	Valid	Baranov & Blodgett	Devonian (Pragian)	Soda Creek Limestone	United States	A member of Rhynchonellida belonging to the subfamily Hebetoechiinae. The type species is "Lancemyonia" varia Tcherkesova (1969).	
Tegulithyris? plencnerae	Sp. nov	Valid	MacFarlan	Early Jurassic (Upper Aratauran and Ururoan)		New Zealand	A member of Terebratulida belonging to the family Tegulithyrididae.	
Thebesia shelvensis	Sp. nov	Valid	Cocks	Silurian (Llandovery)		United Kingdom		
Thuringorhynchus	Gen. et sp. nov	Valid	Mottequin et al.	Carboniferous (Tournaisian)	Gleitsch Formation; Hangenberg Limestone	Germany	A member of Rhynchonellida belonging to the family Pugnacidae. The type species is T. pseudoequitans.	
Tornquistia changhsingia	Sp. nov	Valid	He, Shi & Shen in He et al.	Permian (Changhsingian)		China	A member of Chonetidina belonging to the family Anopliidae and the subfamily Anopliinae.	
Trigonithyris wilsoni	Sp. nov	Valid	Feldman et al.	Middle Jurassic (Callovian)	Mughanniyya	Jordan	Announced in 2019; the final version of the article naming it was published in 2021.	
Triplesia habberleyensis	Sp. nov	Valid	Cocks	Silurian (Llandovery)		United Kingdom		
Tritoechia bolohaulensis	Sp. nov	Valid	Cocks & Popov	Early Ordovician		United Kingdom		
Tumarinia uldsiensis	Sp. nov	Valid	Manankov	Permian		Mongolia	A member of Spiriferinida.	
Ukhtomica	Gen. et sp. nov	Valid	Oleneva	Devonian		Russia	A member of Spiriferida belonging to the family Echinospiriferidae. The type species is U. lata; genus also includes U. apschakensis (Krylova, 1955).	
Virgianoides	Gen. et comb. nov	Valid	Jin, Mikulic & Kluessendorf	Silurian (Rhuddanian)	Mayville Dolomite	United States (Wisconsin)	A member of Pentamerida belonging to the family Virgianidae. The type species is BVirgiana barrandei var. major Savage (1916), raised to the rank of a separate species V. major.	
Weiningia ziyunensis	Sp. nov	Valid	Yuan et al.	Carboniferous (Serpukhovian)	Baizuo Formation	China	A member of Spiriferida belonging to the family Martiniidae.	
Whitfieldella alvarezensis	Sp. nov	Valid	Cocks	Silurian (Llandovery)		United Kingdom		
Xenocrania	Gen. et comb. nov	Valid	Chen & Rong	Ordovician		China; Myanmar; Poland; United Kingdom; Czech Republic?	The type species is "Palaeocyclus" haimei Reed.	
Zeilleria recessa	Sp. nov	Valid	MacFarlan	Early Jurassic (Hettangian)		New Zealand	A member of Terebratulida belonging to the family Zeilleriidae.	
Zeilleria sacciformis	Sp. nov	Valid	MacFarlan	Early Jurassic (Ururoan)	Ururoa Formation	New Zealand	A member of Terebratulida belonging to the family Zeilleriidae.	
Zeilleria terezowae	Sp. nov	Valid	MacFarlan	Early Jurassic (Aratauran and Ururoan)	Ururoa Formation	New Zealand	A member of Terebratulida belonging to the family Zeilleriidae.	
Zittelina hofmanni	Sp. nov	Valid	Bujtor & Vörös	Early Cretaceous		Hungary		
Zygospiraella nupera	Sp. nov	Valid	Baarli	Silurian (Aeronian)	Solvik	Norway	A member of the family Atrypidae. Announced in 2019; the final version of the article naming was published in 2021.	
Zygospiraella? ventricosa	Sp. nov	Valid	Cocks	Silurian (Llandovery)		United Kingdom		
