= Rovuma plate =

Tectonic microplate in Africa

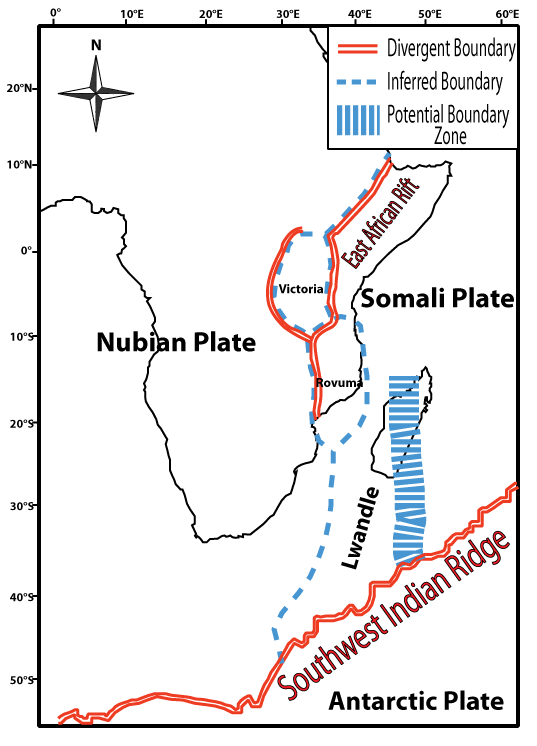
Rovuma and its neighboring plates are shown. This figure is simplified, modified from Stamps et al. 2008.

The Rovuma plate or Rovuma microplate is one of the four tectonic microplates that, together with the larger Nubian plate, form the African plate. The other three are the Somali plate, the Lwandle plate and the Victoria plate. Onshore, the plate encompasses northeast Mozambique east of Lake Malawi and parts of southern Tanzania. Offshore it extends onto the oceanic crust of the Mozambique Channel, as far east as the Davie Ridge, continuing as a narrow strip off Tanzania.
