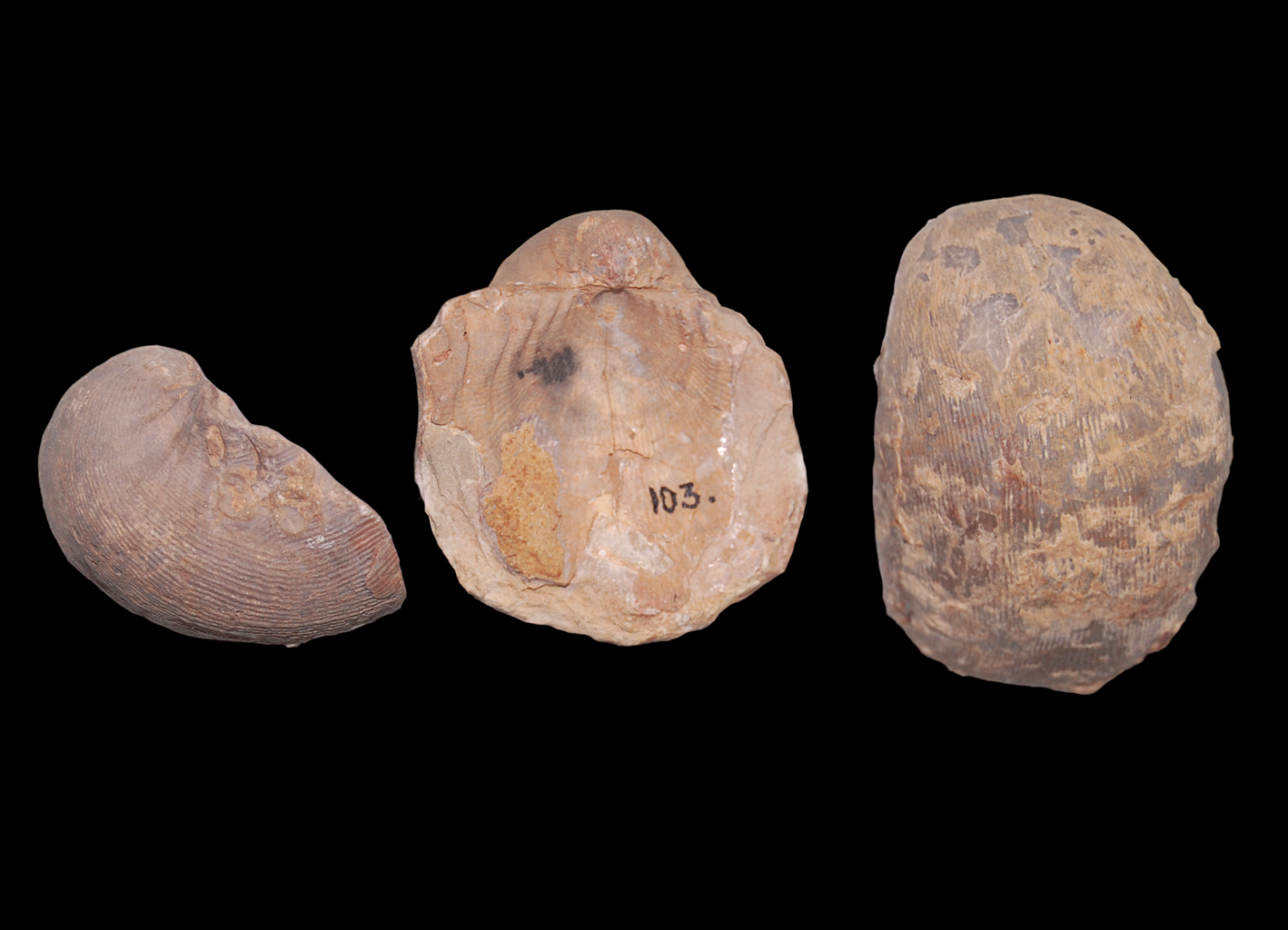
- Fossil of Linoproductus from the Oxford University Museum of Natural History

Scientific classification
- Domain: Eukaryota
- Kingdom: Animalia
- Phylum: Brachiopoda
- Class: †Strophomenata
- Order: †Productida
- Suborder: †Productidina
- Superfamily: †Linoproductoidea; Stehli, 1954

Families
- Linoproductidae; Monticuliferidae; Schrenkiellidae

= Linoproductoidea =

Linoproductoidea Temporal range: Pragian–Upper Permian

Superfamily of marine lamp shells

Linoproductoidea is an extinct superfamily of brachiopods which lived from the Devonian to Permian periods. Their fossils have been found in marine formations dating to those periods on all continents.

== Description ==
Linoproductoids commonly had long but simple trails, and fine, regular ribbing across the entire shell. Thick and symmetrical ventral spines were present on the hinge and diverse across the remainder of the valve, while the dorsal valve lacked spines (except in grandaurispinins and certain gigantoproductins).

== Evolution ==
Initially, the surface of the ventral valves of linoproductoids had posterior and anterior spines of around the same thickness. Very early in the Carboniferous, the group evolved two additional spine-distribution patterns: one with the thickest spines confined to the hinge margin and another where they are confined to the trail. Three families were established based on these three patterns.
