= Southwest Indian Ridge =

Mid-ocean ridge in the Indian and Atlantic Oceans

Approximate surface projection on southern oceans of Southwest Indian Ridge. Approximate surface projection on oceans of fracture zones is shown. Key: Fracture zones; Probable extension of Fracture zones; Fracture zone of relevance to article; Probable extension relevant to article; Mid-oceanic ridges; Sea; Land; Clicking on the rectangle icon enables full window and mouse-over with text detail.

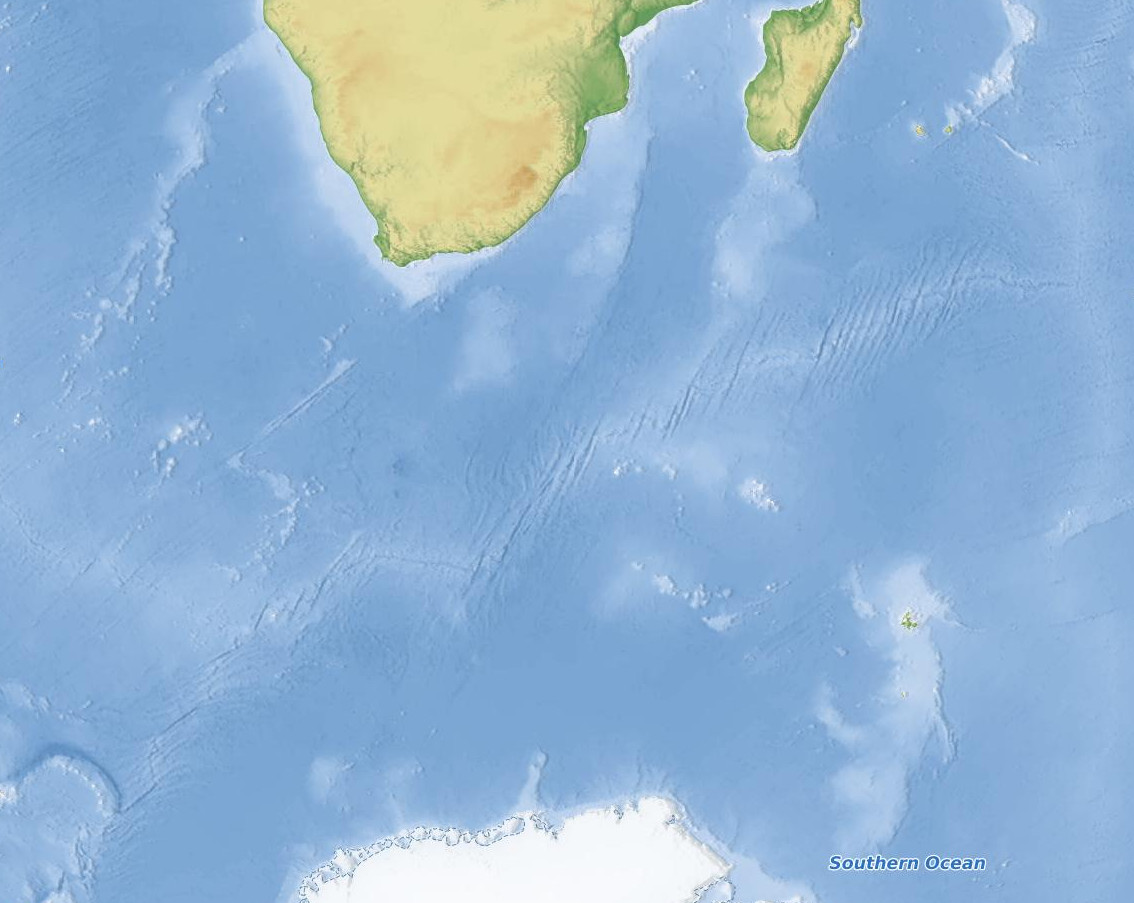
Separating the African (or Nubian–Somali plates) and Antarctic plates, the Southwest Indian Ridge (SWIR) stretches 7,700 km (4,800 mi) from the Atlantic Ocean to the Indian Ocean. With an average spreading rate of 14–15 millimetres per year (0.55–0.59 in/year), the SWIR is one of the slowest-spreading mid-ocean ridges on Earth. Characterised by numerous large transform offsets, most of the SWIR is highly segmented and oblique relative to the spreading direction.

The Southwest Indian Ridge (SWIR) is a mid-ocean ridge located along the floors of the south-west Indian Ocean and south-east Atlantic Ocean. A divergent tectonic plate boundary separating the Somali plate to the north from the Antarctic plate to the south, the SWIR is characterised by ultra-slow spreading rates (only exceeding those of the Gakkel Ridge in the Arctic) combined with a fast lengthening of its axis between the two flanking triple junctions, Rodrigues (20°30′S 70°00′E) in the Indian Ocean and Bouvet (54°17′S 1°5′W) in the Atlantic Ocean.

== Geological setting ==
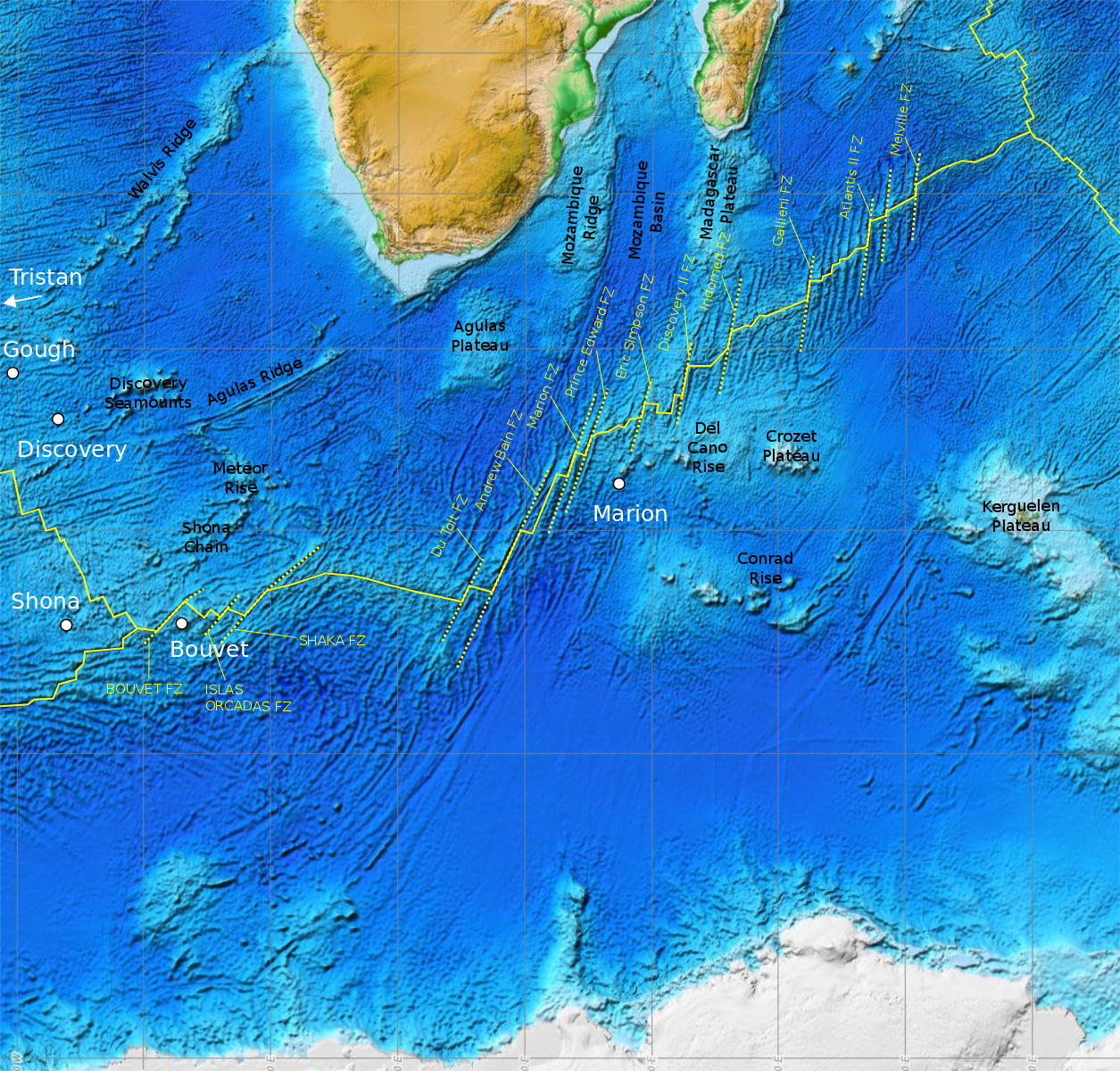
Topography of the SWIR. White dots are hotspots, dashed lines are fracture zones.

=== Spreading rates ===
The spreading rate along the SWIR varies: the transition between slow (30 mm/yr) and ultra-slow (15 mm/yr) spreading occur at magnetic anomaly C6C (c. 24 Ma). This occurs between 54° and 67°E, the deepest, and perhaps coldest and most melt-poor, part of Earth's mid-ocean ridge system. Crustal thickness decreases quickly as spreading rates drop below c. 20 mm/yr and in the SWIR there is an absence of volcanic activity along 100 km (62 mi) stretches of ridge axis.

Along large sections, the SWIR runs obliquely relative to the spreading direction, typically about 60°. Because obliquity increases ridge length while decreasing mantle upwelling rates, the SWIR is transitional between slow and ultra-slow ridges. The slow-spreading sections of the SWIR have magmatic segments linked by transform faults, while the ultra-slow sections lack such transforms and have magmatic segments linked by amagmatic troughs.

=== Diffuse plate boundaries ===
Spreading in the SWIR is slow, but the plate boundary is intersected by the much slower but more diffuse Nubian–Somalian boundary. The variation in spreading rates indicate the SWIR is not a spreading centre between two rigid plates, but that the previously assumed single African plate north of the SWIR is in fact divided into three plates: the Nubian, Lwandle, and Somalian plates.

The location on the SWIR of this "diffuse" triple junction between the Nubian, Somali, and Antarctic plates has been estimated to between 26°E and 32°E or just west of the Andrew Bain transform fault. This diffuse triple junction forms the southern end of the East African Rift system.

=== In situ Jurassic rocks ===
180 Ma-old rocks, dated from zircons in diorite and gabbro, were dredged from a location 60 km (37 mi) south of the SWIR in 2010. This age is comparable to that of the break-up of Gondwana, the opening of the Indian Ocean, and emplacement of the Karoo Large Igneous Province (179–183 Ma) – in sharp contrast the Neogene age of the ocean floor near the SWIR. It can be assumed the rocks were deposited near the SWIR by an external force, such as an ice-rafting or a tsunami, but the SWIR is located far away from any continental margin and rocks of similar age have been reported from the Mid-Atlantic Ridge. If the rocks came directly out of the mantle it would have lost most of its isotopic lead. Ice-rafted dropstones commonly show signs of rounding.

Hydrothermal circulation at mid-ocean ridges can, however, bring intrusive rocks into the shallow mantle, and it is possibly a good candidate in this case. Most rocks in Africa facing the SWIR are Archean cratons. The Neoproterozoic Pan-African Orogenic Belt, however, was accreted during the closure of the Mozambique Ocean and some rocks from eastern Africa, Madagascar, and Antarctica are associated with this event. During the break-up of Gondwana the Karoo volcanics intruded the Pan-African rocks and it is possible, rather than evident, that these rock found their way to the SWIR this way. Because spreading in the SWIR is ultra-slow, the mantle beneath should be abnormally cool, which could prevent melting of the rocks.

== Subsections ==
=== Bouvet TJ – Andrew Bain TF ===
The western end of the SWIR, known as the Bouvet Ridge, is bounded by the Bouvet and Moshesh transforms north and south of it respectively. The Bouvet Ridge is 110 km (68 mi) long with a full spreading rate of 14.5 mm/a (0.57 in/year) during the last 3 Ma. The axial valley is a kilometre deep, typical of slow-spreading ridges, and 16 km wide, which is unusually wide. The zero-age axis lies 2,000 m (6,600 ft) below sea level in the central segment, but deeper closer to the two transforms: This is roughly a kilometre shallower than similar slow-spreading ridges, probably because of the vicinity to the BTJ.

Between 9 and 25°E, the SWIR trends E–W and lacks transforms. This section is composed of orthogonal magmatic accretionary segments linked by oblique amagmatic accretionary segments.

The oblique portion of this area (9 to 16°E), the "oblique supersegment", is highly variable in axial orientation, ranging from orthogonal to 56°, and its series of magmatic and amagmatic segments results in abruptly fluctuating magmatism and ultra-slow spreading. West of a discontinuity at 16°E axial depth drops 500 m and there is an abrupt change in morphology and magnetism. In the western end of this area (9°30'–11°45') a short magmatic ridge segment intersects the Shaka FZ. The rough topography here obscures the SWIR which runs into the western flank of the Joseph Mayes Seamount, one of few volcanic centres along the oblique supersegment. The seamount splits an old peridotite block, the remains of which project on either side of the ridge, and fills the rift valley in between, resulting in a double-peaked volcano sitting on the SWIR. East of the seamount (11°30'–10°24'E) there is a 180 km-long and 4,200 m-deep amagmatic segment. Reaching a maximum depth of 4,700 m, its deepest part has a rough floor void of signs of recent volcanism but filled with irregular horst blocks partially made of serpentinised peridotite.

The "orthogonal supersegment" (16 to 25°E), in contrast, is almost perfectly orthogonal relative to the spreading direction and is composed of magmatic accretionary segments linked by short non-transform offsets. Where the obliquity of the SWIR increases so does its length. This lengthening results in a decrease in mantle upwelling and a ridge geometry characteristic of ultra-slow spreading ridges (<12 mm/yr). The orthogonal supersegment is similar to larger ridge segments of the Mid-Atlantic Ridge.

=== Andrew Bain TF ===
A series of fracture zones – Du Toit, Andrew Bain, Marion, and Prince Edward – offsets the SWIR 1,230 km (760 mi) between 45°S,35°E and 53°S,27°E. The largest of these, the 750 km long-long Andrew Bain FZ, is where the Nubia-Somalia boundary intersects the SWIR. The active section of the Andrew Bain TF represents the largest age-offset (65 Ma) of any oceanic transform fault and it is also the widest (120 km). Its extension extends south from the Mozambique Escarpment (between the Mozambique Ridge and Basin) to the Astrid Ridge off Antarctica. East of the Andrew Bain TF is the "Marion Swell", the geoid high of the Southern Ocean, between 35°E and 50.5°E, and the Madagascar Plateau and the Del Cano Rise. The SWIR crosses the flank of the swell before reaching the Marion hotspot at 36°E.

Marion Island, where the Marion hotspot is located, lies 250 km (160 mi) from the SWIR on 28 Ma crust. Bouvet Island, located 300 km (190 mi) from the Bouvet triple junction and 55 km (34 mi) from the SWIR, is located on 7 Ma crust, though the exact location of the Bouvet hotspot has not been determined.

=== Andrew Bain TF – Melville FZ ===
Between the Marion hotspot and Gallieni FZ there is an irregular segmentation with relatively shallow axial depth. Between Prince Edward FZ and Atlantis II FZ (35–57°E), all major transform faults (and their 35 Ma associated magnetic anomalies) are increasingly trending more directly north–south. Magnetic anomalies in the Mozambique Basin indicate this is the dominant spreading direction for the past 80 Ma.

Major changes at Discovery FZ (42°E), Galliene FZ (52°E), and Melville FZ (60°E) define large-scale segmentation of the SWIR. Mean axial depth varies between 4,730 m (15,520 ft) between Melville FZ and Rodrigues TJ, a section underlain by either thin crust or cold mantle, to 3,050 m (10,010 ft) between Andrew Bain FZ and Discovery FZ, a section affected by the Marion hotspot.

Between Indomed and Gallieni FZs the SWIR is more shallow and has a higher magma supply than neighbouring deeper sections; the crust is also thicker and/or the mantle hotter. This is probably due to the interaction with the Crozet hotspot, the increased magmatism of which resulted in the large Crozet volcanic plateau at c. 10 Ma. The hotspot also triggers thermal plumes and incorporates small amounts of lower mantle material (resulting in a mixed Ocean Island Basalt (OIB)/Mid-ocean ridge basalt (MORB) signature). The Crozet hotspot/Bank is, however, located more than 1000 km from the SWIR and ridge-hotspot interaction at distances beyond 500 km is, theoretically, supposed to be insignificant. The Kerguelen and Réunion hotspots are, however, probably interacting with the Southeast Indian Ridge and Central Indian Ridge over similar distances, as suggested by volcanic chains and lineaments connecting those ridges and hotspots. The absence of such lineaments between the SWIR and Crozet can be explained by plate age and thickness – plates older than 25 Ma are thought to be too thick for plumes to penetrate.

Between the Gallieni and Melville FZs the SWIR was originally roughly perpendicular to the spreading direction with few and small offsets. About 40 Ma a clockwise change in spreading direction quickly resulted in evenly spaced offsets and a more rugged terrain. Since then, the Atlantis II transform fault has grown while the offsets west and east of it have begun to disappear. About 40 Ma in the future the Gallieni, Atlantis II, and Melvilles transform faults will continue to grow while the SWIR segments between them will keep most of their present length and shape.

=== Melville FZ – Rodrigues TJ ===
East of the Indomed FZ (south of Madagascar) the SWIR is the product of the 64 million years of eastward propagation of the Rodriguez triple junction. This section is composed of regularly spaced non-transform discontinuities, short oblique amagmatic segments, and the Atlantis II, Novara, and Melville transforms. An increase in axial depth east of 49°E reflects non-magmatic extension.

The segmentation and morphology in the axial valley of the easternmost SWIR is unique to ultra-slow spreading ridges. 3000 m-high ridge segments are linked by more than 100 km-long axial segments. There is no volcanism along this section. The flanks of the ridge axis are wide and lack a volcanic crustal layer. These flanks are rounded and smooth and lack the corrugated pattern associated with oceanic core complexes. This non-volcanic sea-floor is made of seawater-altered mantle-derived rocks brought to the surface by large-scale detachment faults. During the last 10 Ma these detachment faults have flipped back and forth across the ridge axis and produced almost all the divergence along this section of the SWIR.

In the easternmost SWIR, east of Melville FZ (60°45' E), the mantle is unusually cold and the crust thin (3.7 km in average) resulting in only partial melting in the mantle and a decrease in melt supply to the SWIR in this region. This shortage in magma supply has resulted in fewer but taller seamounts east of Melville; there are more than 100 seamounts per 10^{3} km^{2} about 50 m tall west of Melville whereas east of Melville there are fewer than 10 seamounts per 10^{3} km^{2} more than 100 m tall.

== Tectonic history ==
The SWIR is characterised by deep, sub-parallel, and well-delineated fracture zones, sometimes deeper than 6,000 m (20,000 ft), delineated by elevated rims, sometimes reaching up to 2,000 m (6,600 ft) below sea level. These fracture zones are very long and often align with older structures near the continental shelves. These fracture zones, and their extensions into the Agulhas Basin, are flow-lines describing the motion of Africa and Antarctica since break-up of Gondwana in the Late Cretaceous.

The SWIR opened during the break-up of Gondwana when Antarctica broke off from Africa during the Permian-Triassic Karoo large igneous province c. 185–180 Ma in what is now the Mozambique Basin and the Riiser-Larsen Sea. The spreading direction between the continents started to change around 74 Ma and 69–64 Ma spreading slowed (c. 1 cm/yr) then changed orientation to NE–SW. Fracture zones near Prince Edward FZ are from the Eocene, much younger than could be assumed from their length.

== See also ==
- Central Indian Ridge
- Southeast Indian Ridge
- Rodrigues triple junction
