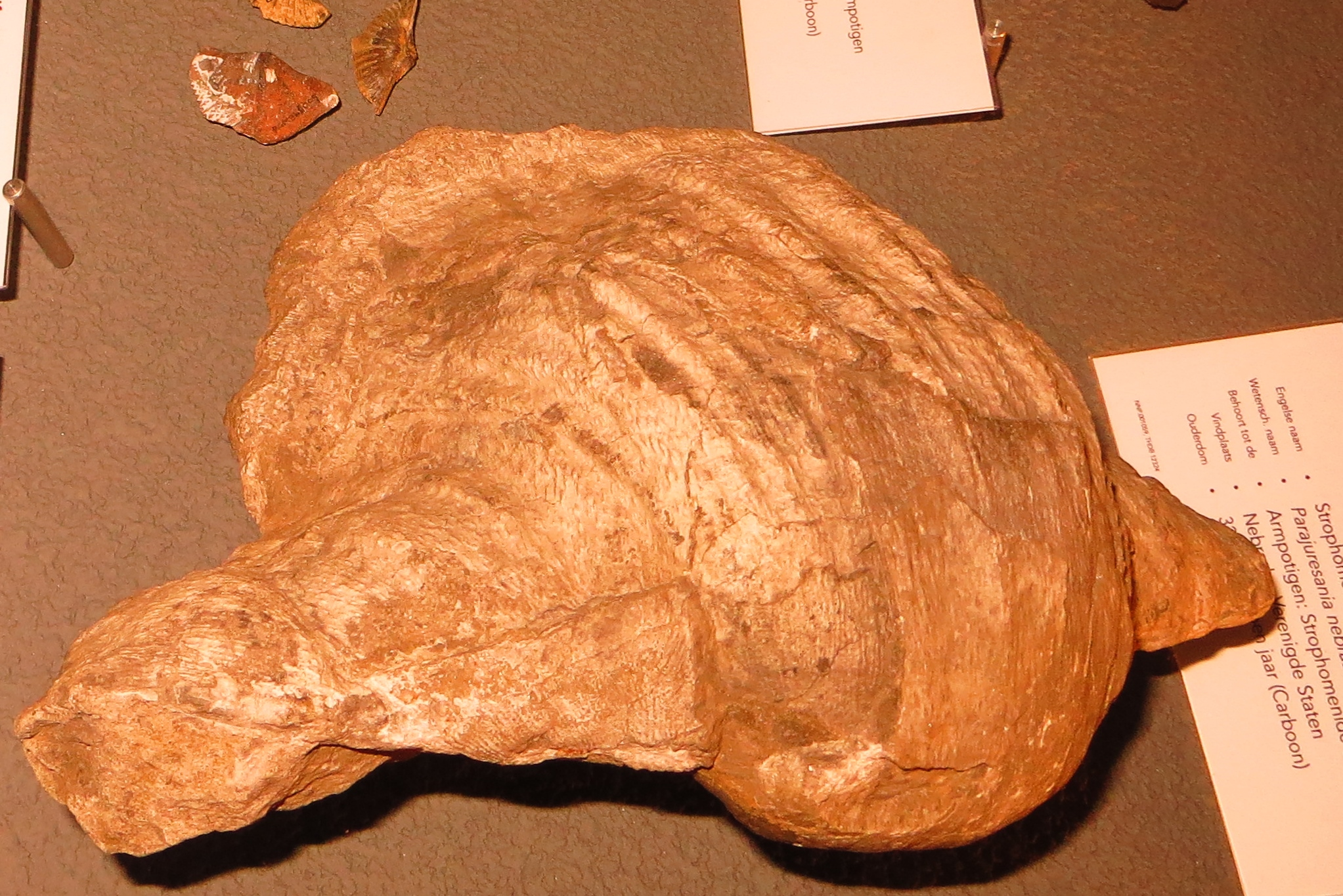

Scientific classification
- Kingdom: Animalia
- Phylum: Brachiopoda
- Class: †Strophomenata
- Order: †Productida
- Family: †Monticuliferidae
- Genus: †Gigantoproductus
- Species: †G. giganteus

Binomial name
- †Gigantoproductus giganteus (Sowerby, 1822)

= Gigantoproductus giganteus =

Gigantoproductus giganteus Temporal range: Carboniferous ~339.4–318.1 Ma

Extinct species of large brachiopod

Gigantoproductus giganteus ("Gigantic giant Productus") is an extinct species of brachiopods in the family Monticuliferidae, known only from its fossil remains. It was a marine invertebrate found on the seabed in shallow seas. It evolved during the Carboniferous period and it is believed to be the largest brachiopod that has ever existed.

== Description ==
Gigantoproductus giganteus was a large brachiopod that superficially resembled a cockle. Fossils of this species have been found with shell widths of 30 centimetres (12 in). and more than 35 cm (14 in). It had a pair of thick dome-shaped valves joined by a hinge. The valves had a small number of broad ribs that radiated from a thick umbo and there were large wing-shaped ears of calcareous material on either side. The valves were held together by a central strong adductor muscle which left a scar on the inside of the valves. The ventral valve, also known as the pedicle valve, was covered with spines on the outside. The inside of this valve was rough, being covered by numerous cone-shaped protrusions. These are visible in an internal mould of the brachiopod, a cast fossil which has been formed when a hole in sediment left by the soft tissues of the dead organism was later infiltrated by mineral matter.

== Distribution and habitat ==
The fossil record suggests that Gigantoproductus giganteus was common between about 345 and 328 million years ago. Fossils have been found in Europe, Asia and North Africa. The morphology of the shell makes it likely that it lived on the seabed, partially buried in sand or mud, in shallow water in locations with strong waves and currents. Here its large size, its heavy weight, its ears and spines would have helped provide stability, preventing it from rolling around.

== Biology ==
These brachiopods were photoautotrophic. Like other brachiopods, Gigantoproductus giganteus was a filter feeder, using its lophophore, a specialist feeding organ, to extract planktonic particles from the water. Reproduction was likely to have involved release of gametes into the water column.
