= Elenchus =

Elenchus is a word, borrowed into English from Latin, which typically means some kind of refutation or cross-examination. It may refer to:

- Elenchus (brachiopod) Gray, 1843, a genus of brachiopods that is a synonym of Weiningia
- Elenchus (insect) Curtis, 1831, a parasitic insect genus in the family Elenchidae
- Elenchus (book), a third-century book also known as Refutation of All Heresies
- Method of elenchus, a form of cooperative argumentative dialogue, that is the central technique of the Socratic method
