= Absenticosta =

Absenticosta Temporal range: Mississippian

Scientific classification
- Kingdom: Animalia
- Phylum: Brachiopoda
- Class: †Strophomenata
- Order: †Productida
- Family: †Productellidae
- Genus: †Absenticosta; Lazarev, 1991

Species
- Absenticosta bruntoneileenae Absenticosta uldzejtuensis

Extinct genus of marine lamp shells

Absenticosta is an extinct genus of brachiopods found in Viséan strata in Mongolia and Argentina. It was a stationary epifaunal suspension feeder.
