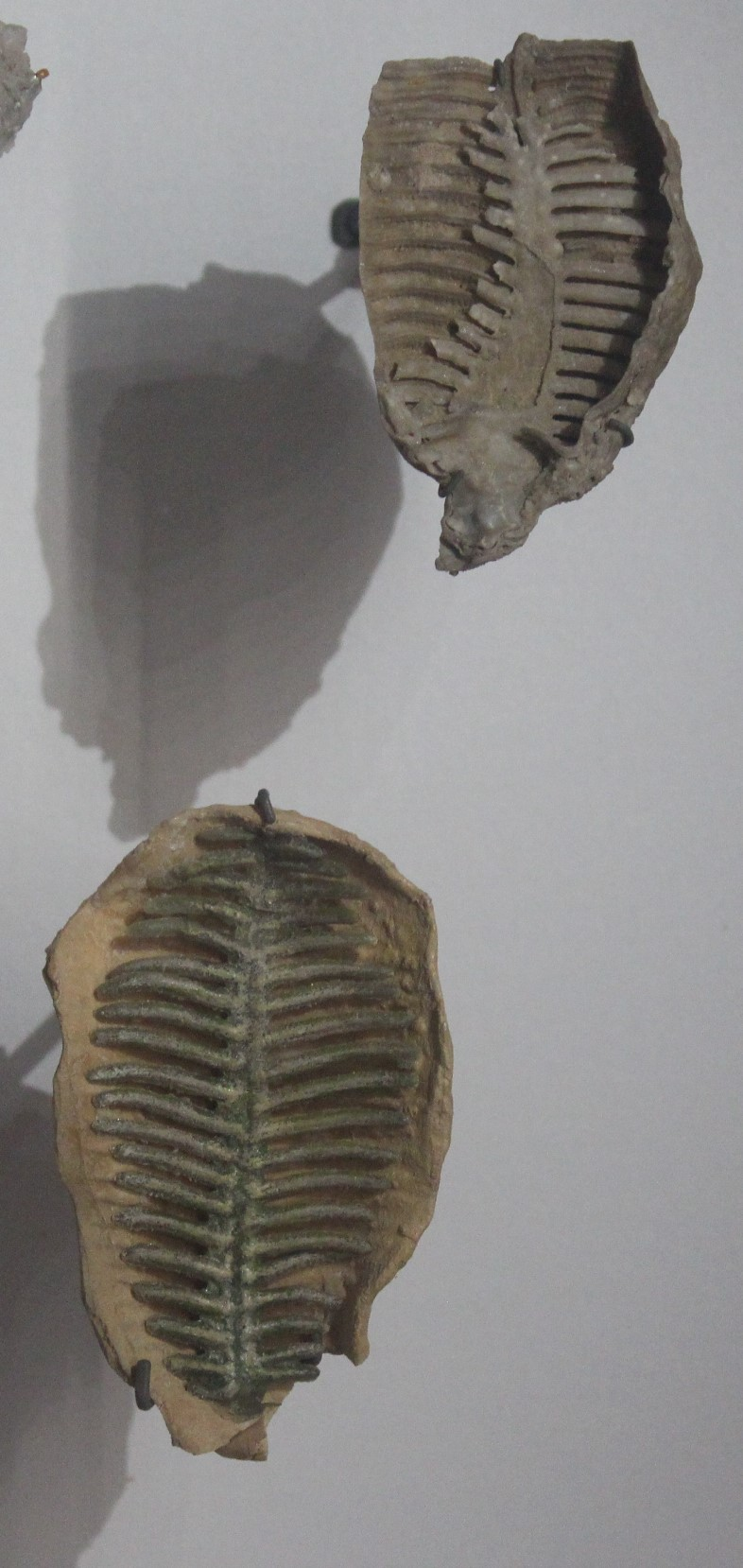
- Paratype (USNM 150821) of C. elegans, National Museum of Natural History

Scientific classification
- Kingdom: Animalia
- Phylum: Brachiopoda
- Class: †Strophomenata
- Order: †Productida
- Family: †Lyttoniidae
- Subfamily: †Lyttoniinae
- Genus: †Collemataria; Cooper & Grant, 1974

= Collemataria =

Collemataria Temporal range: Permian

Extinct genus of brachiopods

Collemataria is an extinct genus of brachiopods from the Permian.
