= East African Rift =

Active continental rift zone in East Africa

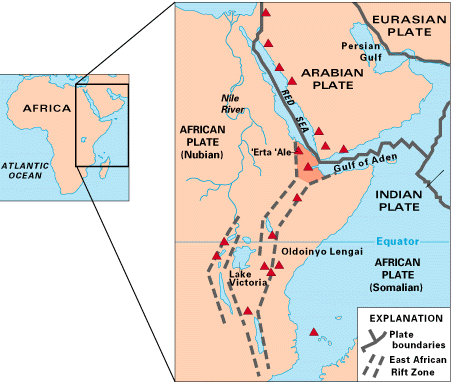
A map of East Africa showing some of the historically active volcanoes (as red triangles) and the Afar Triangle (shaded at the center), which is a so-called triple junction (or triple point) where three plates are pulling away from one another: the Arabian plate and two parts of the African plate—the Nubian and Somali—splitting along the East African Rift Zone

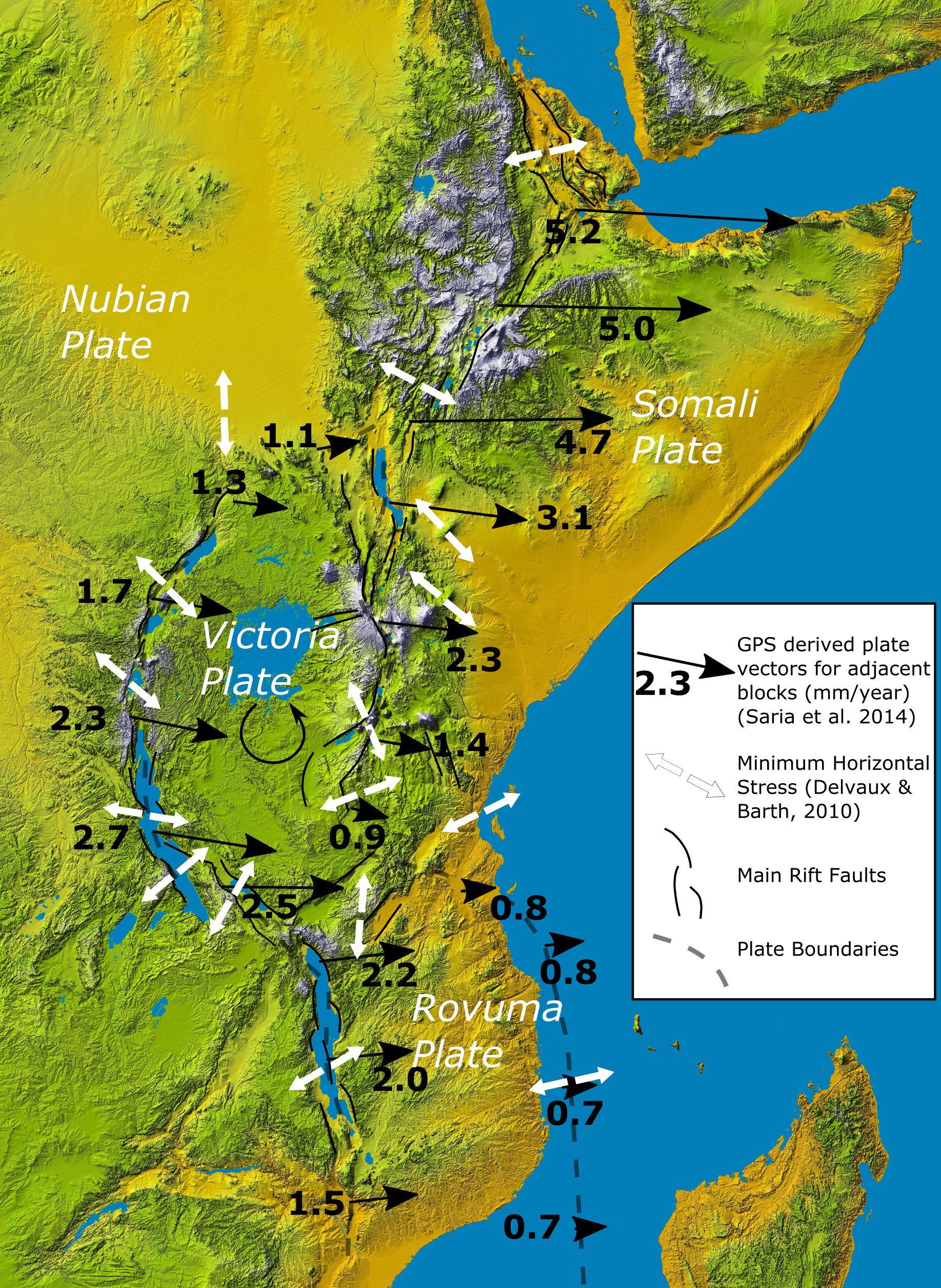
Main rift faults, plates, plate boundaries, GPS plate velocities between adjacent blocks and minimum horizontal stress directions

The East African Rift (EAR) or East African Rift System (EARS) is an active continental rift zone in East Africa. The EAR began developing around the onset of the Miocene, 22–25 million years ago. It is considered to be part of a larger system, formerly known as the Great Rift Valley, that extends north to Asia Minor, also known as Anatolia.

A narrow zone, the rift is a developing divergent tectonic plate boundary where the African plate is in the process of splitting into two tectonic plates, called the Somali plate and the Nubian plate, at a rate of 8–9 mm (0.31–0.35 in) per year. The rift system consists of three microplates, the Victoria microplate to the north, and the Rovuma and Lwandle microplates to the south. The Victoria microplate is rotating anti-clockwise with respect to the African plate. Its rotation is caused by the configuration of mechanically weaker and stronger lithospheric regions in the EARS.

Many of the African Great Lakes lie within the Rift Valley.

== Extent ==
A series of distinct rift basins, the East African Rift System extends over thousands of kilometers. North of the Afar triple junction, the rift follows two paths: west to the Red Sea Rift and east to the Aden Ridge in the Gulf of Aden.

Southward from the Afar triple junction, the EAR consists of two main branches. The Eastern Rift Valley (also known as Gregory Rift) includes the Main Ethiopian Rift, runs southward from the Afar triple junction, and continues south as the Kenyan Rift Valley, into northern Tanzania. The Western Rift Valley includes the Albertine Rift, which transects Democratic Republic of the Congo, Uganda, Rwanda, and Burundi through the Ruzizi Plain, and farther south Tanzania, Zambia, the valley of Lake Malawi and Mozambique.

The rift also continues offshore from the coast of Mozambique along the Kerimba and Lacerda grabens, which are joined by the Davie Ridge, a 2,200 km-long (1,400 mi) relic fracture zone that cuts across the West Somali basin, straddling the boundary between Tanzania and Mozambique. The Davie Ridge ranges between 30–120 km (19–75 mi) wide, with a west-facing scarp (east-plunging arch) along the southern half of its length that rises to 2,300 m (7,500 ft) above the sea floor. Its movement is concurrent with the EAR.

== Competing theories on geologic evolution ==
Over time, many theories have tried to clarify the evolution of the East African Rift. In 1972 it was proposed that the EAR was not caused by tectonic activity, but rather by differences in crustal density. Since the 1990s, evidence has been found in favor of mantle plumes beneath the EAR. Others proposed an African superplume causing mantle deformation. Although the effects of deep-rooted mantle plumes are an important hypothesis, their location and dynamics are poorly understood, and a matter of active research. The question is still debated.

Maps of four different depth slices of the Shear-velocity (Vs) model developed by Emry et al. 2018. The forms of the zones with lower Vs (colors toward red) suggest the hotter structures in the Mantle. The distinguishing fourth map depicts a depth below the 410 km discontinuity where Vs steeps up (getting overall bluer), but it still displays the signature of a plume at the substrate of the East African Rift. In the white box, the Vs vertical profile at 10°N, 40°E illustrates the increase of velocity with depth and the effect of the 410 km discontinuity.

The most recent and accepted view is the theory put forth in 2009: that magmatism and plate tectonics have a feedback with one another, controlled by oblique rifting conditions. According to this theory, lithospheric thinning generates volcanic activity, further increasing magmatic processes such as intrusions and numerous small plumes. These processes further thin the lithosphere in saturated areas, making the thinning lithosphere behave like a mid-ocean ridge. According to marine geologist Kathleen Crane, the rift could eventually cause eastern Africa to separate from the mainland, although this potential event could take tens of millions of years.

Studies that contribute to the broader understanding on the evolution of rifts can be grouped into the techniques of isotope geochemistry, seismic tomography and geodynamical modeling.

=== Isotope geochemistry ===
The varying geochemical signatures of a suite of Ethiopian lavas suggest multiple plume sources: at least one of deep mantle origin, and one from within the subcontinental lithosphere. In accordance, a 2014 study compares the geochemical signature of rare earth isotopes from xenoliths and lava samples collected in the EAR. The results corroborate the coexistence of a superplume "common to the entire rift" with another mantle material source being either of subcontinental type or of mid-ocean ridge type.

=== Seismic tomography ===
The geophysical method of seismic tomography is a suitable tool to investigate Earth's subsurface structures deeper than the crust. It is an inverse problem technique that models which are the velocities of the inner Earth that reproduce the seismographic data recorded all around the world. Recent improvements of tomographic Earth models of P wave and S wave velocities suggest that a superplume upwelling from the lower mantle at the northeastern EAR feeds plumes of smaller scale into the upper mantle.

=== Geodynamical modeling ===
Parallel to geological and geophysical measures (e.g. isotope ratios and seismic velocities) it is constructive to test hypotheses on computer based geodynamical models. A 3D numerical geodynamic model of the plume-crust coupling was capable of reproducing the lateral asymmetry of the EAR around the Tanzania craton. Numerical modeling of plume-induced continental break-up shows two distinct stages, crustal rifting followed by lithospheric breakup, and the upwelling between stages of an upper mantle plume.

== Geologic evolution ==
Prior to the rift's formation, enormous continental flood basalts erupted, uplifting the Ethiopian, Somali, and East African plateaus. The first stage of rifting of the EAR was characterized by rift localization and magmatism along the entire rift zone. Periods of extension alternated with relative inactivity. There was also the reactivation of a pre-Cambrian weakness in the crust, a suture zone of multiple cratons, displacement along large boundary faults, and the development of deep asymmetric basins. The second stage of rifting was characterized by the deactivation of large boundary faults, the development of internal fault segments, and the concentration of magmatic activity towards the rifts.

Today, the narrow rift segments of the East African Rift system form zones of localized strain. These rifts are the result of the actions of numerous normal faults which are typical of all tectonic rift zones. As aforementioned, voluminous magmatism and continental flood basalts characterize some of the rift segments, while other segments, such as the Western branch, have only very small volumes of volcanic rock.

== Petrology ==
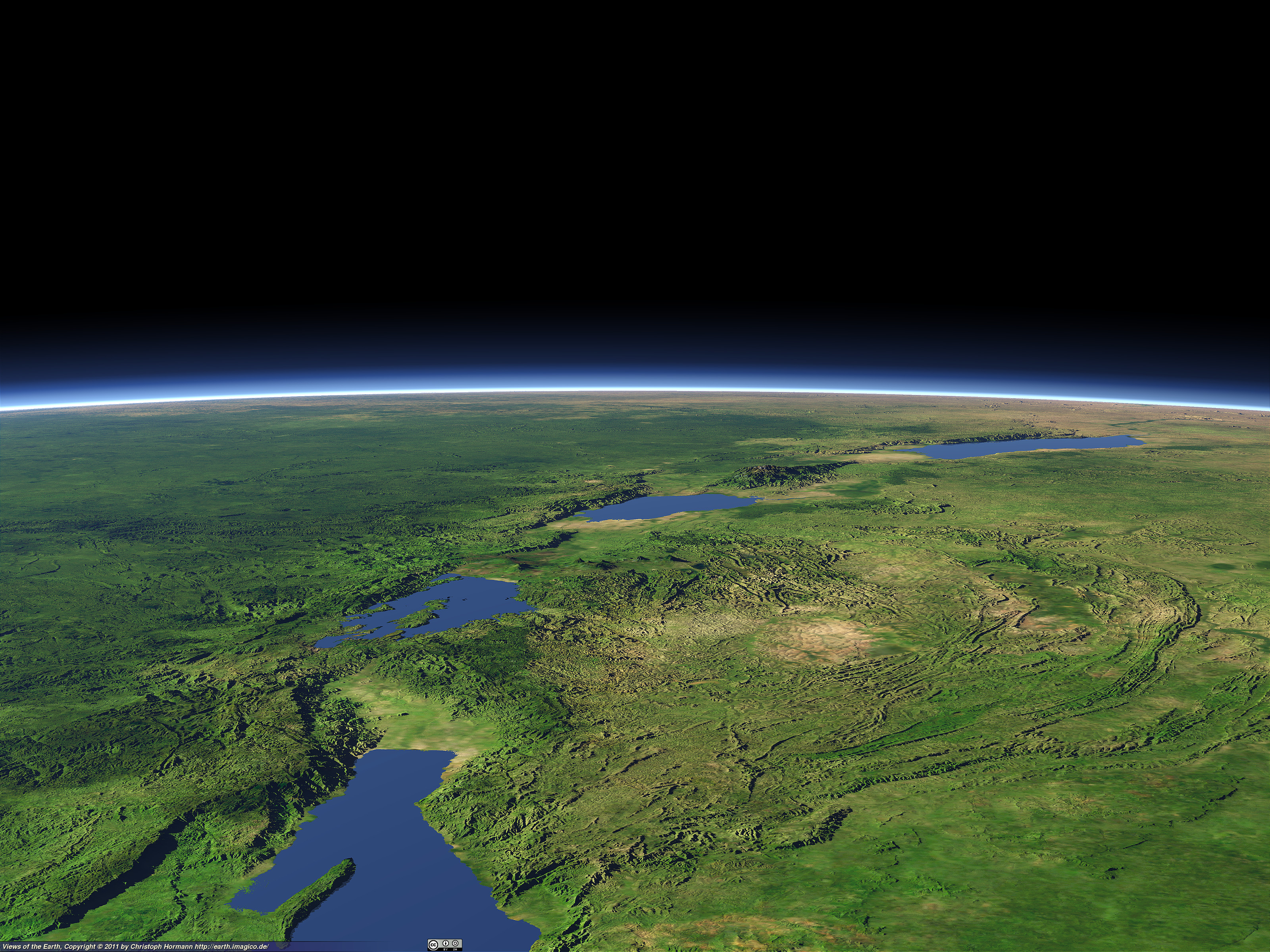
An artificial rendering of the Albertine Rift, which forms the western branch of the East African Rift. Visible features include (from background to foreground): Lake Albert, the Rwenzori Mountains, Lake Edward, the volcanic Virunga Mountains, Lake Kivu, and the northern part of Lake Tanganyika

The African continental crust is generally cool and strong. Many cratons are found throughout the EAR, such as the Tanzania and Kaapvaal cratons. The cratons are thick, and have survived for billions of years with little tectonic activity. They are characterized by greenstone belts, tonalites, and other high-grade metamorphic lithologies. The cratons are of significant importance in terms of mineral resources, with major deposits of gold, antimony, iron, chromium and nickel.

A large volume of continental flood basalts erupted during the Oligocene, with the majority of the volcanism coinciding with the opening of the Red Sea and the Gulf of Aden approximately 30 Ma. The composition of the volcanics are a continuum of ultra-alkaline to tholeiitic and felsic rocks. It has been suggested that the diversity of the compositions could be partially explained by different mantle source regions. The EAR also cuts through old sedimentary rocks deposited in ancient basins.

== Volcanism and seismicity ==
The East African Rift Zone includes a number of active and dormant volcanoes, among them: Mount Kilimanjaro, Mount Kenya, Mount Longonot, Menengai Crater, Mount Karisimbi, Mount Nyiragongo, Mount Meru and Mount Elgon, as well as the Crater Highlands in Tanzania. Although most of these mountains lie outside of the rift valley, the EAR created them.

Notable active examples of EAR volcanism include Erta Ale, Dalaffilla (also called Gabuli, Alu-Dalafilla), Hayli Gubbi (which erupted in 2025), and Ol Doinyo Lengai. Erta Ale is a basaltic shield volcano in the Afar Region of northeastern Ethiopia, active continuously since at least 1967, with a summit lava lake documented since at least 1906. The 2008 eruption of Dalafilla, its only documented activity since the start of the Holocene, is the largest recorded eruption in Ethiopian history. Ol Doinyo Lengai is currently the only active natrocarbonatite volcano on Earth. Its magma contains almost no silica; typical lava flows have viscosities of less than 100 Pa⋅s, comparable to olive oil at 26 °C (79 °F). EAR-related volcanic structures with dated activity since the onset of the Holocene include approximately 50 in Ethiopia, 17 in Kenya, and 9 in Tanzania.

The EAR is the largest seismically active rift system on Earth today. The majority of earthquakes occur near the Afar Depression, with the largest typically occurring along or near major border faults. Seismic events in the past century are estimated to have reached a maximum moment magnitude of 7.0. The seismicity trends parallel to the rift system, with a shallow focal depth of 12–15 km (7.5–9.3 mi) beneath the rift axis. Further away from the rift axis, focal depths can be below 30 km (19 mi). Focal mechanism solutions strike NE and frequently demonstrate normal dip-slip faulting, although left-lateral motion is also observed.

== Effect on climate ==
The East African Rift system affects regional, continental and even global climate. Regions of higher elevation, including the Ethiopian Highlands and the Kenya Highlands are hotspots of higher rainfall amid the semi-arid to arid lowlands of East Africa. Lakes which form within the rift, including Lake Victoria, have a large effect on regional climate. They are a source of water vapour, and also lead to the formation of lake breeze systems, which affect weather across large areas of East Africa. The east to west river valleys within the rift system, including the Turkana Channel in northern Kenya and the Zambezi river valley, concentrate low-level easterly winds and accelerate them towards Central Africa. This leaves East Africa drier than it otherwise would be, and also supports the high rainfall in the Congo Basin rainforest. The formation of the east–west valleys could in turn be important for the aridification of East Africa over millions of years.

The barrier presented by EARS concentrates monsoonal winds (known as the Somali Jet) in the western Indian Ocean. The Somali Jet supplies water vapour for the high rainfall during the Indian Monsoon and is responsible for roughly half the global cross-equatorial atmospheric mass flux in the lower-branch of Hadley Circulation.

== Discoveries in human evolution ==
The Rift Valley in East Africa has been a rich source of hominid fossils that allow the study of human evolution. The rapidly eroding highlands quickly filled the valley with sediments, creating a favorable environment for the preservation of remains. The bones of several hominid ancestors of modern humans have been found here, including those of "Lucy", a partial australopithecine skeleton discovered by anthropologist Donald Johanson dating back over 3 million years. Richard and Mary Leakey have also done significant work in this region. In 2008, two other hominid ancestors were discovered here: a 10-million-year-old ape called Chororapithecus abyssinicus, found in the Afar rift in eastern Ethiopia, and Nakalipithecus nakayamai, which is also 10 million years old.

== See also ==
- Baikal Rift Zone
- Lake Victoria
- Northern Cordilleran Volcanic Province
- West Antarctic Rift System
- West and Central African Rift System
