= Camp Nelson Limestone =

Geologic formation in Kentucky

- Stratigraphic range: Ordovician
- Type: Formation
- Underlies: Oregon Formation

Location
- Region: Southeastern United States
- Country: United States
- Extent: Kentucky

The Camp Nelson Limestone is a geologic formation in Kentucky. It dates back to the Ordovician period. It is mainly composed of limestone and shale. Member of Highbridge Group
