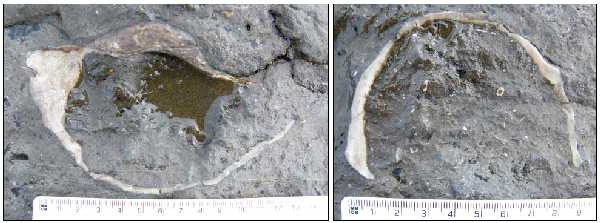
- Gigantoproductus sp. (discovered near Seahouses, Northumberland, England)

Scientific classification
- Kingdom: Animalia
- Phylum: Brachiopoda
- Class: †Strophomenata
- Order: †Productida
- Family: †Monticuliferidae
- Subfamily: †Gigantoproductinae
- Tribe: †Gigantoproductini
- Genus: †Gigantoproductus; Prentice, 1950

Species
- †Gigantoproductus crassus; †Gigantoproductus giganteus; †Gigantoproductus elongatus; †Gigantoproductus inflatus; †Gigantoproductus sinuatus; †Gigantoproductus striato-sulcatus

= Gigantoproductus =

Gigantoproductus Temporal range: Carboniferous, ~339.4–318.1 Ma

Extinct genus of brachiopods

Gigantoproductus is a genus of extinct brachiopods in the order Productida and the family Monticuliferidae. The species were the largest of the carboniferous brachiopods, with the largest known species (Gigantoproductus giganteus) reaching 30 cm (12 in) in shell width. Such huge invertebrates appeared in the Mississippian as the proportion of oxygen in the atmosphere began to rise. The earliest members of the Productida date back to the Silurian period, and Gigantoproductus is known to have existed between 339.4 and 318.1 million years ago, during the Carboniferous period. As fossils, their shells occur within a limestone matrix.

== See also ==
- List of brachiopod genera
