= Prince Edward fracture zone =

Area on the junction between the Somali and Antarctic plates

Approximate surface projection on oceans of fracture zones is shown.
Key:
- '"`UNIQ--templatestyles-00000000-QINU`"' Fracture zones
- '"`UNIQ--templatestyles-00000001-QINU`"' Probable extension of Fracture zones
- '"`UNIQ--templatestyles-00000002-QINU`"' Fracture zone of relevance to article
- '"`UNIQ--templatestyles-00000003-QINU`"' Probable extension relevant to article
- '"`UNIQ--templatestyles-00000004-QINU`"' Mid-oceanic ridges
- '"`UNIQ--templatestyles-00000005-QINU`"' Sea
- '"`UNIQ--templatestyles-00000006-QINU`"' Land
- Clicking on the rectangle icon enables full window and mouse-over with text detail.'"`UNIQ--ref-00000007-QINU`"'

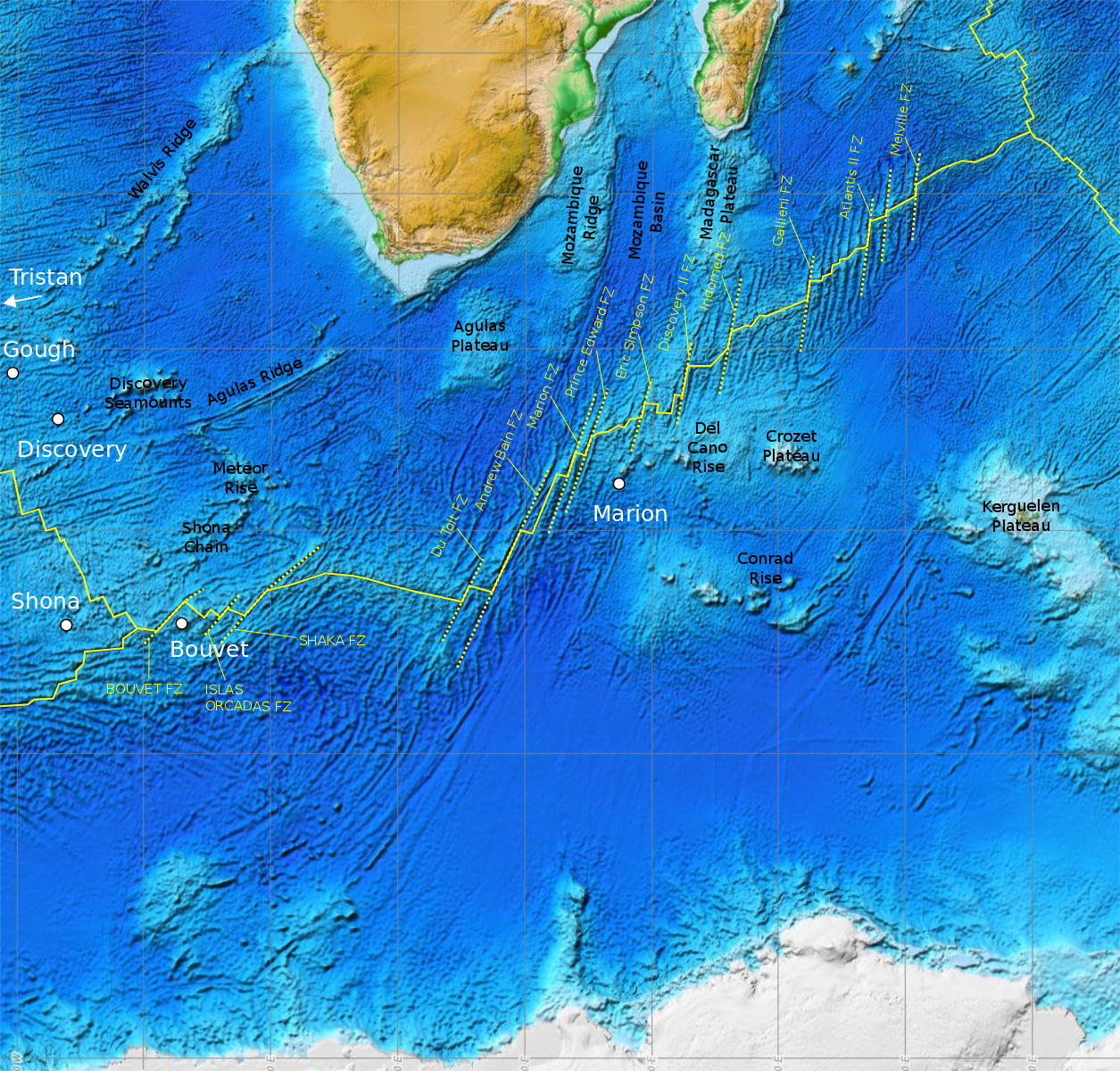
The Prince Edward fracture zone is located near the centre of the Southwest Indian Ridge.

The Prince Edward fracture zone (PEFZ) is one of the fracture zones located on the Southwest Indian Ridge in the Indian Ocean between Africa and Antarctica. The PEFZ is located west of Prince Edward Islands.

The history of seafloor spreading between Africa and Antarctica since the breakup of Gondwana can be traced using magnetic anomaly lineations between the Mozambique Channel and the seafloor of Dronning Maud Land. Before the 1980s it was assumed that this spreading occurred continuously for 80 million years, from the Cretaceous to present, along the fracture zones flanking the mid-ocean ridge. In the mid-80s new magnetic lineations discovered near the PEFZ made it clear that a change in the spreading direction occurred 74–56 Ma. As the direction of spreading changed so did the phase.

The largest offset along the Southwest Indian Ridge (800 km (500 mi)) is located west of the PEFZ and east of the Du Toit fracture zone (45°S, 35°E; 53°S, 27°E). During the Late Cretaceous this offset was smaller than 250 km (160 mi).

Antarctic Bottom Water flows north through the PEFZ.
