= Oregon Formation =

Geologic formation in Kentucky, US

- Stratigraphic range: Ordovician
- Type: Formation
- Underlies: Tyrone Limestone
- Overlies: Camp Nelson Limestone

Location
- Region: Southeastern United States
- Country: United States
- Extent: Kentucky

The Oregon Formation is a geologic formation in Kentucky. It dates back to the Ordovician period .
