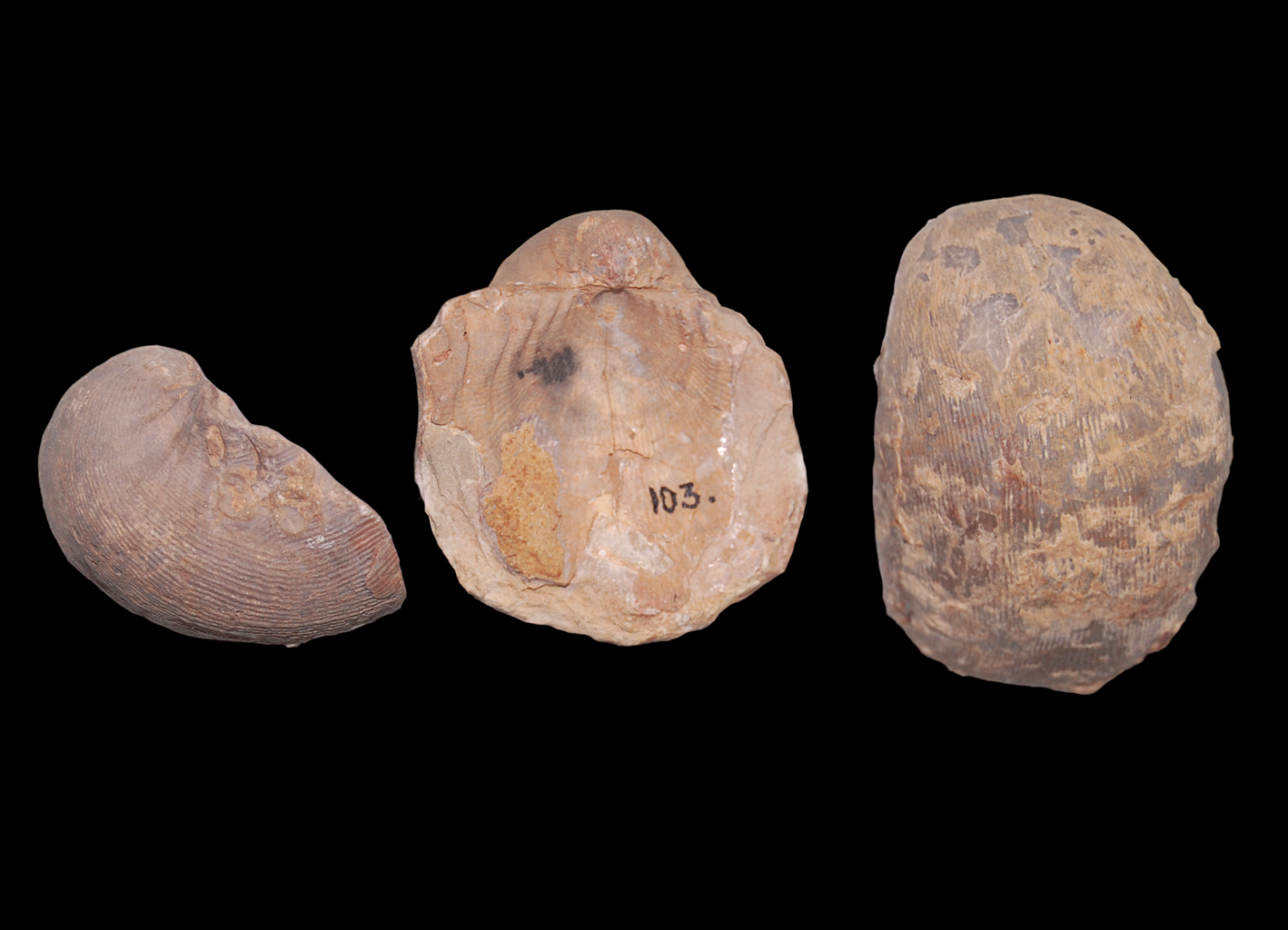
- Fossil from the Oxford University Museum of Natural History

Scientific classification
- Kingdom: Animalia
- Phylum: Brachiopoda
- Class: †Strophomenata
- Order: †Productida
- Family: †Linoproductidae
- Subfamily: †Linoproductinae
- Genus: †Linoproductus; Chao, 1927

Species
- See text

= Linoproductus =

Linoproductus Temporal range: Carboniferous-Permian ~354–252 Ma

Extinct genus of brachiopod

Linoproductus is an extinct genus of brachiopod belonging to the order Productida and family Linoproductidae. Specimens have been found in Carboniferous to Permian beds in Asia, North America, and South America.

== Species ==
- L. antonioi Verna and Angiolini 2011
- L. caima Chen et al. 2004
- L. cora d'Orbigny 1842
- L. delawarii Marcou 1858
- L. kharaulakhensis Fredericks 1915
- L. lineatus Waagen 1884
- L. planiconvexus Sun et al. 2026
- L. prattenianus Norwood and Pratten 1855
- L. simensis Tschernyschew 1902
- L. tenuistriatus de Verneuil 1845
