= African plate =

Tectonic plate underlying Africa

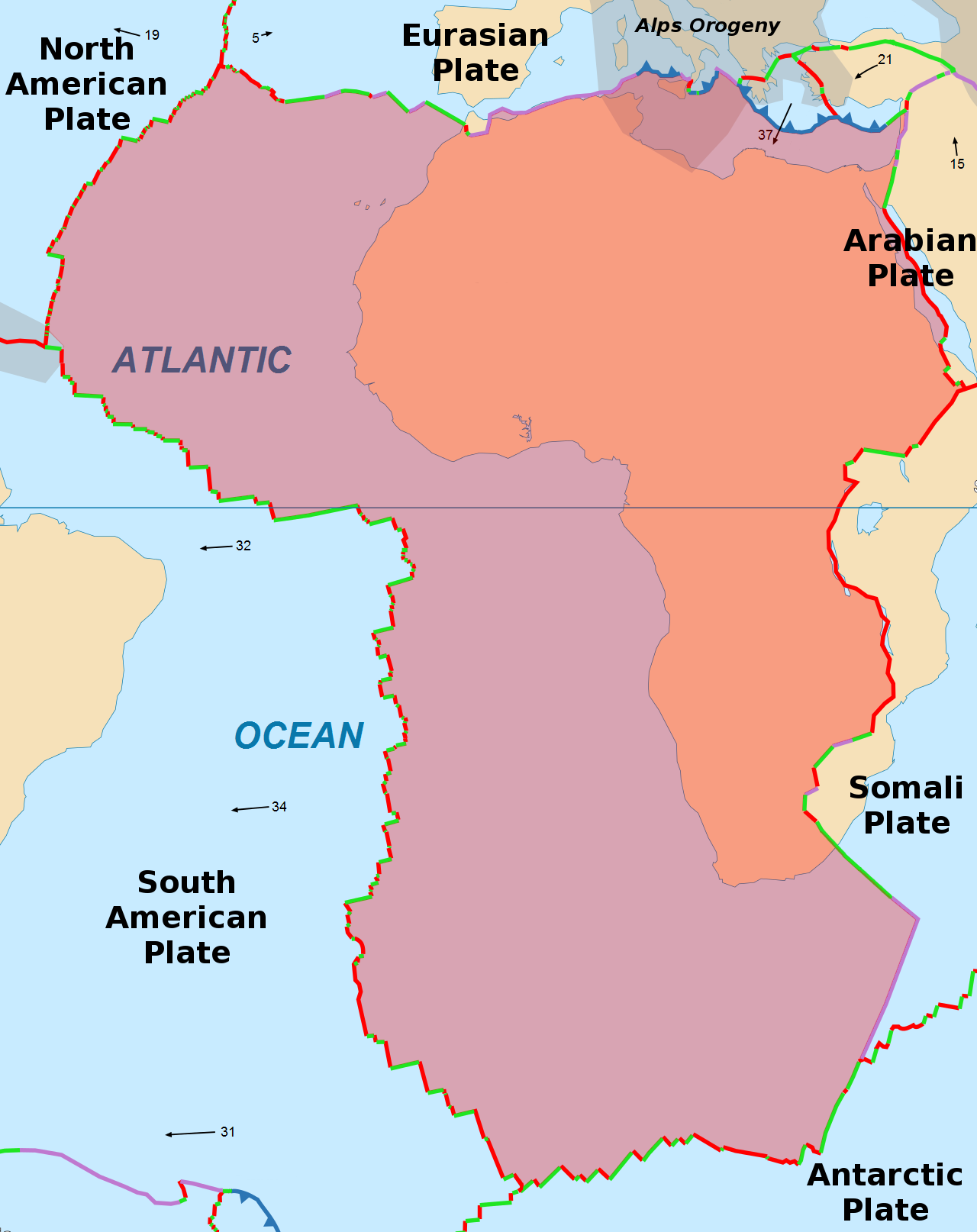
- Type: Major
- Approximate area: 61,300,000 km^{2} (23,700,000 sq mi)
- Features: Africa, Atlantic Ocean, Mediterranean Sea, Red Sea

The African plate, also known as the Nubian plate, is a major tectonic plate that includes most of the continent of Africa (except for its easternmost part) and the adjacent oceanic crust to the west and south. It also includes a narrow strip of West Asia along the Mediterranean Sea, including much of Israel, Lebanon, and Palestine. It is bounded by the North American plate and South American plate to the west (separated by the Mid-Atlantic Ridge); the Arabian plate and Somali plate to the east; the Eurasian plate, Aegean Sea plate and Anatolian plate to the north; and the Antarctic plate to the south.

Between 60 million years ago and 10 million years ago, the Somali plate began rifting from the African plate along the East African Rift. Since the continent of Africa consists of crust from both the African and the Somali plates, some literature refers to the African plate as the Nubian plate to distinguish it from the continent as a whole.

== Boundaries ==
The western edge of the African plate is a divergent boundary with the North American plate to the north and the South American plate to the south which forms the central and southern part of the Mid-Atlantic Ridge. The African plate is bounded on the northeast by the Arabian plate, the southeast by the Somali plate, the north by the Eurasian plate, the Aegean Sea plate, and the Anatolian plate, and on the south by the Antarctic plate at the Southwest Indian Ridge. All of these are divergent or spreading boundaries with the exception of the northern boundary and a short segment near the Azores known as the Terceira Rift.

== Components ==
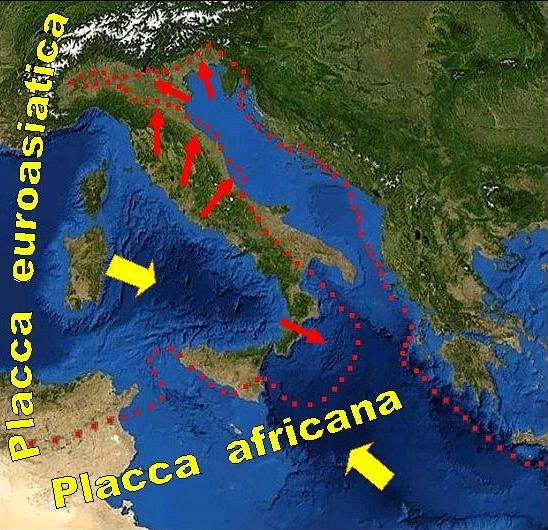
Tectonic dynamics in the Adriatic basin - The western limit of the Adriatic basin currently shifts by about 40 mm per year towards the east, under the thrust of the Eurasian plate, resulting in a gradual narrowing of the Adriatic Sea. The Po Valley is part of the African plate. (Text in Italian)

The African plate includes several cratons, stable blocks of old crust with deep roots in the subcontinental lithospheric mantle, and less stable terranes, which came together to form the African continent during the assembly of the supercontinent Pangea around 250 million years ago. The cratons are from south to north, the Kalahari Craton, Congo Craton, Tanzania Craton and West African Craton. The cratons were widely separated in the past, but came together during the Pan-African orogeny and stayed together when Gondwana split up. The cratons are connected by orogenic belts, regions of highly deformed rock where the tectonic plates have engaged.

The Saharan Metacraton has been tentatively identified as the remains of a craton that has become detached from the subcontinental lithospheric mantle, but alternatively may consist of a collection of unrelated crustal fragments swept together during the Pan-African orogeny.

In some areas, the cratons are covered by sedimentary basins, such as the Tindouf Basin, Taoudeni Basin and Congo Basin, where the underlying archaic crust is overlaid by more recent Neoproterozoic sediments. The plate includes shear zones such as the Central African Shear Zone (CASZ) where, in the past, two sections of the crust were moving in opposite directions, and rifts such as the Anza Trough where the crust was pulled apart, and the resulting depression filled with more modern sediment.

== Modern movements ==
Today, the African plate is moving over Earth's surface at a speed of 32.51 km per million years relative to the Earth's "average" crust velocities (see NNR-MORVEL56)

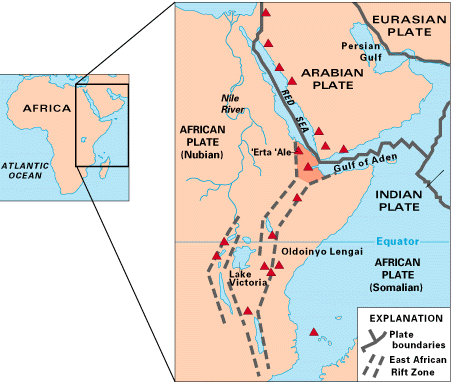
Map of East Africa showing some of the historically active volcanoes (red triangles) and the Afar Triangle (shaded, center) – a triple junction where three plates are pulling away from one another: the Arabian plate, the African plate, and the Somali plate (USGS)

The African plate is rifting in the eastern interior of the African continent along the East African Rift. This rift zone separates the African plate to the west from the Somali plate to the east. One hypothesis proposes a mantle plume rising beneath the Afar region pushing the crust outward, whereas an opposing hypothesis explains the rifting by dynamics in the crust, as a break in the African plate along a line of maximum weakness as plates to its east move rapidly northward.

The African plate's speed is estimated at 2.15 cm (0.85 in) per year. It has been moving over the past 100 million years or so in a general northeast direction. It is pushing closer to the Eurasian plate, causing subduction where oceanic crust is converging with continental crust (e.g. portions of the central and eastern Mediterranean). In the western Mediterranean, the relative motions of the Eurasian and African plates produce a combination of lateral and compressive forces, concentrated in a zone known as the Azores–Gibraltar Fault Zone. Along its northeast margin, the African plate is bounded by the Red Sea Rift where the Arabian plate is moving away from the African plate.

The New England hotspot in the Atlantic Ocean has probably created a short line of mid- to late-Tertiary age seamounts on the African plate but appears to be currently inactive.
