= Victoria microplate =

Tectonic plate in East Africa

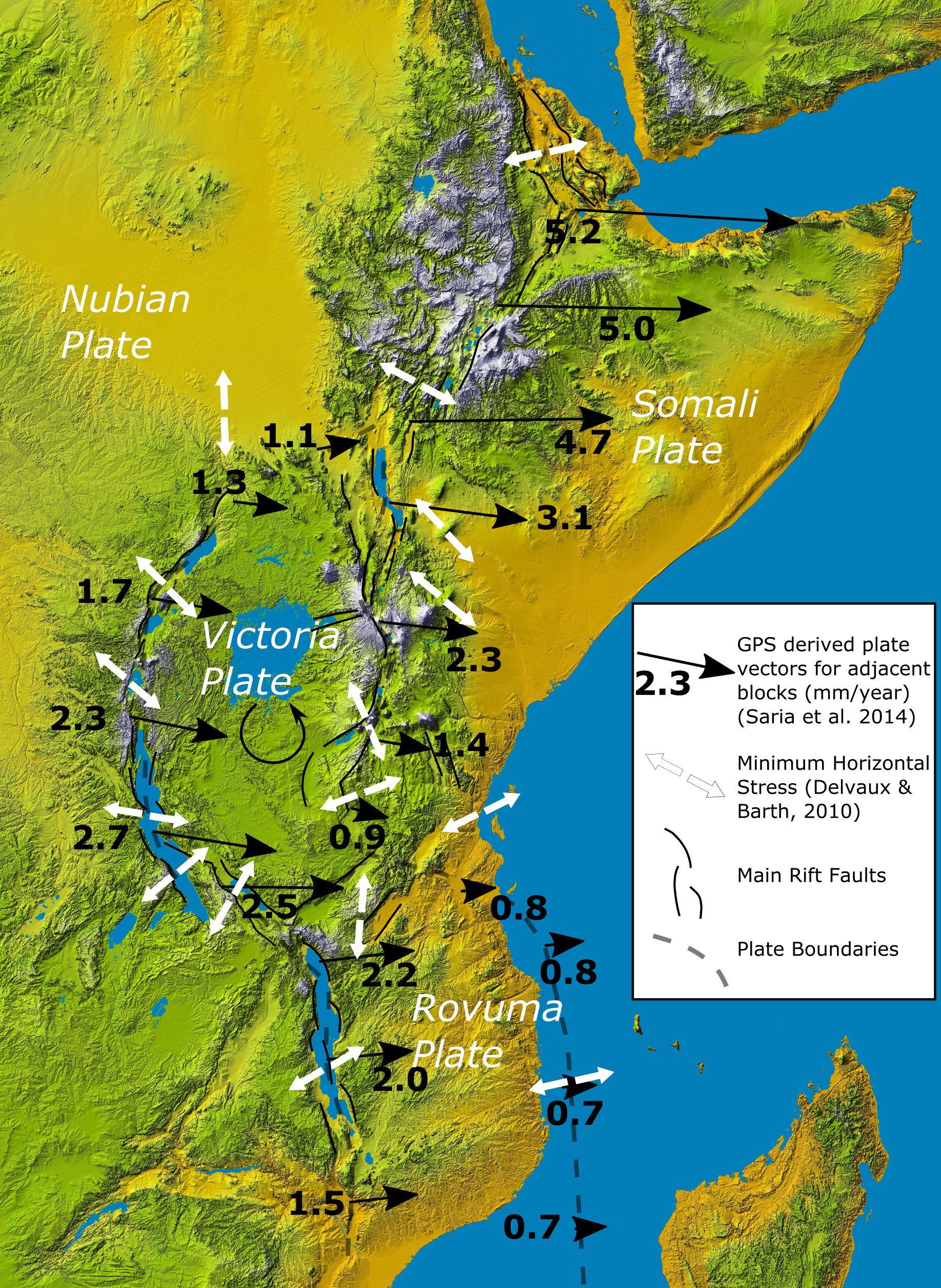
The Victoria plate showing its relationship to the neighbouring Nubian, Somali, and Rovuma plates

The Victoria microplate or Victoria plate is a small tectonic plate in East Africa, with Lake Victoria at its centre. It is bounded on all sides by parts of the active East African Rift System. It is currently rotating anticlockwise. Its boundaries are close to those of the mainly Archaean Tanzania craton, with the two arms of the rift system having propagated along the surrounding Proterozoic shear belts. To the northwest, west and southwest it has a boundary with the Nubian plate, to the northeast and east with the Somali plate and the southeast with the Rovuma plate.

== Tectonic characteristics ==
The Victoria microplate is rotating counter-clockwise (anticlockwise) relative to the African plate. This rotation is mechanically driven by the interaction between the larger Nubian and Somali plates. As these major plates diverge, the mechanically stronger and rigid Victoria microplate acts as a "rolling bearing" or "cog" between the Western Rift and Eastern Rift branches. The shape of the microplate is largely defined by the underlying Tanzania Craton, a block of ancient, hard rock that resists breaking, forcing the rift valleys to curve around it.

== Geographic extent ==
The microplate encompasses significant portions of East African territory. The political boundaries of several nations lie either partially or entirely atop the plate:

- Uganda: The majority of Uganda sits on the microplate, bounded by the rift valley to the west.
- Tanzania: The northwestern region of Tanzania lies on the plate.
- Kenya: The western portion of Kenya lies on the plate, separated from the rest of the country by the Eastern Rift.
- Rwanda: The country is located entirely on the Victoria microplate, with its western border coinciding with the plate's edge along the Albertine Rift.
- Burundi: Like Rwanda, Burundi is situated entirely on the microplate, to the east of the Albertine Rift.
