= Lwandle plate =

Mainly oceanic tectonic microplate off the southeast coast of Africa

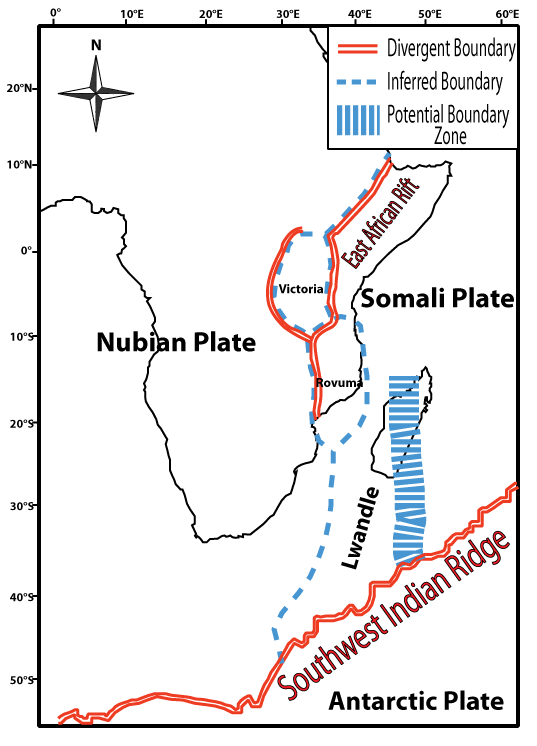
Lwandle and its neighboring plates are shown. This figure is simplified, modified from Stamps et al. 2008.

The Lwandle plate is one of three tectonic microplates, along with the Rovuma plate and Victoria plate, that make up the African plate. Its discovery is very recent, so the velocity of the plate is neither well known nor well understood. Many experiments are ongoing to quantify this. The Lwandle plate lies between 30°E and 50°E, sharing a boundary with the Nubian, Somali, and Antarctic plates.

The Lwandle plate is largely oceanic, lying off the southeast coast of Africa. It is currently believed that the southern part of Madagascar forms part of the Lwandlean plate, with one of the plate boundaries cutting through the island.

== Discovery of the Lwandle plate ==
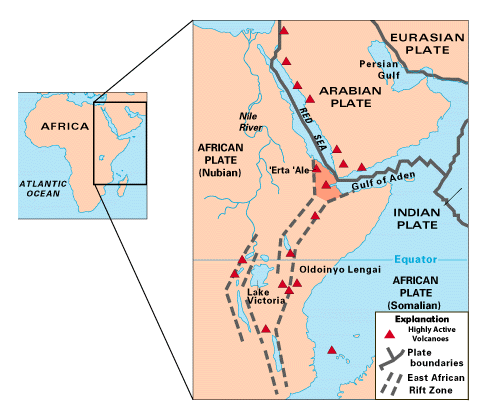
The East African Rift, where three plates are pulling away from one another: the Arabian plate and two parts of the African plate—the Nubian and Somali—which eventually led to the formation of the Lwandle plate as well as other microplates. The Afar Triangle, shaded at the center, is a triple junction that separates the three plates.

For many years it was widely accepted that rifting in the East African Rift system, 22–25 million years ago, resulted in the splitting of the African plate into 2 smaller plates – the Somali plate and the Nubian plate. However, most recently, through the application of GPS technology and integration of earthquake data, it was discovered that the rift created three additional microplates – the Lwandle plate, Victoria plate, and Rovuma plate.

Earthquakes occur most often at plate boundaries and have been used as a guide to predict the locations of multiple plate boundaries. “Lwandle’s” existence was postulated after studying earthquake data in areas that were once assumed to be the interiors of the Nubian and Somali plates. By including the Lwandlean plate in their calculation, researchers were able to more accurately solve for the intersection between the East African Rift and the Southwest Indian Ridge.

GPS technology and data was also introduced in an effort to show with certainty the difference between the Somali plate and the Nubian plate. Using the GPS data, researchers could measure the velocity of tectonic plates from their interiors.

The existence of the Lwandle plate was first quantified using the Lwandle–Antarctica–Nubia plate circuit closure constrained by spreading rates and transform azimuths along the Southwest Indian Ridge. Mathematical plate circuit closure is attained while including the existence of Lwandle; using plate circuit closure, plate velocities can be calculated from the velocities of other plates.

In 2008, the entire East African Rift System was successfully "quantified" through the integration of the GPS and earthquake data with the spreading rate and transform azimuth constraints.

There have been very few studies that directly study the Lwandlean plate. Previous studies about Lwandle have primarily been focused on attempting to quantify the mechanics of the African Rift System. For this reason, the presumed evolution and formation of the microplates are not well known.

== Evolution ==
Lwandle was assumed to be part of the Somali plate, at first. Here are two models that show how thinking about Lwandle has evolved.

Tectonic model excluding Lwandle plate	Tectonic model including Lwandle plate
In this model, Lwandle is considered to be part of the Somali plate.	In this model, Lwandle is its own separate plate.

== Boundary types ==
The majority of Lwandle's plate boundaries are not well understood. What is known is:

- Southern boundary – The Southwest Indian Ridge, an ultra-slow spreading ridge with a slow spreading rate of about 12–18 mm/yr, acts as the southern boundary. This spreading ridge separates Lwandle from the Antarctic plate.
- Eastern boundary – To the east, the boundary may be more of a diffuse boundary. There are current studies trying to pinpoint the exact location of this boundary; it is believed to cut across Madagascar, making it Lwandle's only boundary that is not purely oceanic. Earthquake slip vectors are the primary constraint that predict the actual plate boundaries. Velocity predicted at this boundary is 1.3–1.4 mm/yr. This boundary separates Lwandle from the Somali plate.
- Western boundary – The western boundary is especially poorly understood; there is very little seismic activity along this boundary. Despite that, a misfit to a seafloor magnetic anomaly strongly suggests that motion exists. Some models suggest it is a right-lateral strike slip boundary with a rate of about 1 mm/yr, with some extension. Still, others even suggest that motion ceased at this boundary approximately 11 million years ago. This boundary separates Lwandle from the Nubian plate.
- Northern boundary – Bordering the Lwandle plate to the north is the Rovuma plate.

== Modern movements ==
GPS data paired with earthquake slip data is used to estimate the velocity of the Lwandle plate and its neighbors. The velocity of the Lwandlean plate, relative to the Nubian and Somali plates, is estimated to be a very slow rate (1–2 mm/yr). With these low rates of motion, it is expected that this area wouldn't have much seismic activity. The data supports this expectation. Though Lwandle is moving faster relative to the Antarctic plate than to Nubian and Somali, this spreading ridge is one of the slowest on planet Earth, spreading at less than half the rate of human fingernail growth. It appears that Lwandle will be in its current position for quite some time.

Red arrows show the relative plate velocity at that boundary

== See also ==
- List of tectonic plates
- Plate tectonics
