= Tyrone Limestone =

Geologic formation in Kentucky

- Stratigraphic range: Ordovician
- Type: Formation
- Underlies: Lexington Limestone
- Overlies: Oregon Formation

Location
- Region: Kentucky
- Country: United States

The Tyrone Limestone is a geologic formation in Kentucky. It preserves fossils dating back to the Ordovician period. The formation is predominantly limestone and shale.

== See also ==
- List of fossiliferous stratigraphic units in Kentucky
