= Askerina =

Askerina Temporal range: Ordovician (Hirnantian)–Silurian (Aeronian), 445.2–438.5 Ma

Scientific classification
- Kingdom: Animalia
- Phylum: Brachiopoda
- Class: Rhynchonellata
- Order: †Atrypida
- Family: †Atrypidae
- Subfamily: †Atrypinae
- Genus: †Askerina; Baarli, 2019

Type species
- †Askerina cymbula Baarli, 2019

Extinct genus of brachiopods

Askerina is an extinct genus of atrypid brachiopods from subfamily Atrypinae that lived in end-Ordovician (Hirnantian) and Silurian (Aeronian). The type and only known species is Askerina cymbula. Its fossils are known only from the lower parts of the Solvik Formation in central Oslo region, Norway.

== Discovery and naming ==
Discovery of Askerina cymbula was announced in 2019 by B. Gudveig Baarli, but the final version of the article naming it will be published in 2020. The holotype of the species is a whole shell PMO 41.275 from Malmøya, the Solvik Formation. Also was sectioned specimens PMO S3467, 41.275, 41.317, 220.507a, b. PMO 220.507a was sectioned, that whole, too.

The generic name Askerina is derived from Asker, the municipality where specimens were found. The specific name, cymbula, is derived from the Latin noun cymba, cup or boat-shaped, referring to the deep brachial valve.

== Description ==
Askerina cymbula is a medium to large-sized brachiopod. It has a wide hinge line and strongly dorsibiconvex shape with well-developed fold and sulcus. The beak of this species is small and adpressed with delthidial plates. Ribbing of Askerina cymbula has undulose, concentric growth lamellae, microfilariae and frills. Moderate pedicle of this taxa is collar and callist. Teeth of species members are thick and stubby. Crural bases are small and relatively thin, non-feathered crura. Spiralia has at least 10 dorsomedially whorls. Jugum is unknown.
