= Lyttoniidina =

Scientific classification
- Domain: Eukaryota
- Kingdom: Animalia
- Phylum: Brachiopoda
- Class: †Strophomenata
- Order: †Productida
- Suborder: †Lyttoniidina

Suborder of marine lamp shells

Lyttoniidina is a suborder of the brachiopod order Productida containing the families:

- Superfamily Lyttonioidea
  - Family Lyttoniidae
  - Family Rigbyellidae
- Superfamily Permianelloidea
  - Family Permianellidae
