= Somali plate =

Minor tectonic plate including the east coast of Africa and the adjoining seabed

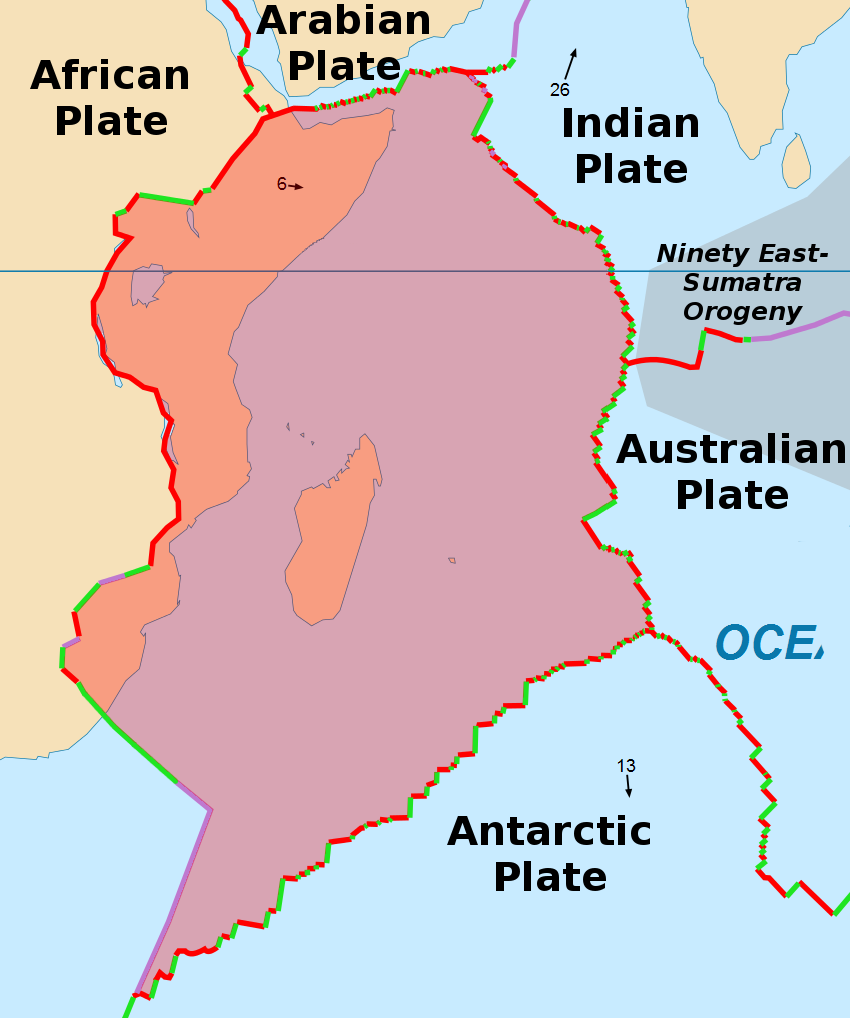
- Type: Minor
- Approximate area: 16,700,000 km^{2} (6,400,000 sq mi)
- Movement^{1}: south-east
- Speed^{1}: 6 mm/year (approx)
- Features: East Africa, Horn of Africa, Gulf of Aden, Socotra Archipelago, Madagascar, Indian Ocean
- ^{1}Relative to the African plate

The Somali plate is a minor tectonic plate which straddles the Equator in the Eastern Hemisphere. It is currently in the process of separating from the African plate along the East African Rift Valley and moving to the Indian subcontinent. It is approximately centered on the island of Madagascar and includes about half of the east coast of Africa, from the Gulf of Aden in the north through the East African Rift Valley. The southern boundary with the Nubian–African plate is a diffuse plate boundary consisting of the Lwandle plate.

== Geology ==
The Arabian plate diverges to the north forming the Gulf of Aden. The Indian plate, Australian plate, and Antarctic plate all diverge from the Somali plate forming the eastern Indian Ocean. The Somali-Indian boundary spreading ridge is known as the Carlsberg Ridge. The Somali-Australian boundary spreading ridge is known as the Central Indian Ridge. The Somali-Antarctic boundary spreading ridge is known as the Southwest Indian Ridge. The western boundary with the African plate is diverging to form the East African Rift, which stretches south from the triple junction in the Afar depression. The southern boundary with the Nubian–African plate is a diffuse plate boundary with the Lwandle plate. The Seychelles and the Mascarene Plateau are located northeast of the Madagascar.

A kinematic model of the Nubian-Somali plates based on DORIS and GPS reports an opening rate of the East African Rift of 4.7–6.7 mm/yr. A more recent synthesis from 2015 states that the most comprehensive geodetic study indicates a "slow clockwise rotation" of the Somali plate relative to the African-Nubian plate and indicates an opening rate that increases northward to about 6 mm/yr in the Afar depression.

== Tectonic history ==
From 1.4–1.2 Ga the Kibaran orogeny fused the Tanzanian and Congo cratons. From 1000 to 600 Ma the super-continent Gondwana was formed and the Pan-African orogeny sutured the Tanzanian and Kalahari cratons. The rifting of Gondwana occurred from 190 Ma to 47 Ma separating Madagascar from the eastern coast of Africa and placing the Seychelles/Mascarene Plateau northeast of Madagascar. The rifting of the Red Sea started around 30 million years ago and the first rifting occurred in the northern West African Rift System around 20 million years ago.

== See also ==
- Victoria microplate
