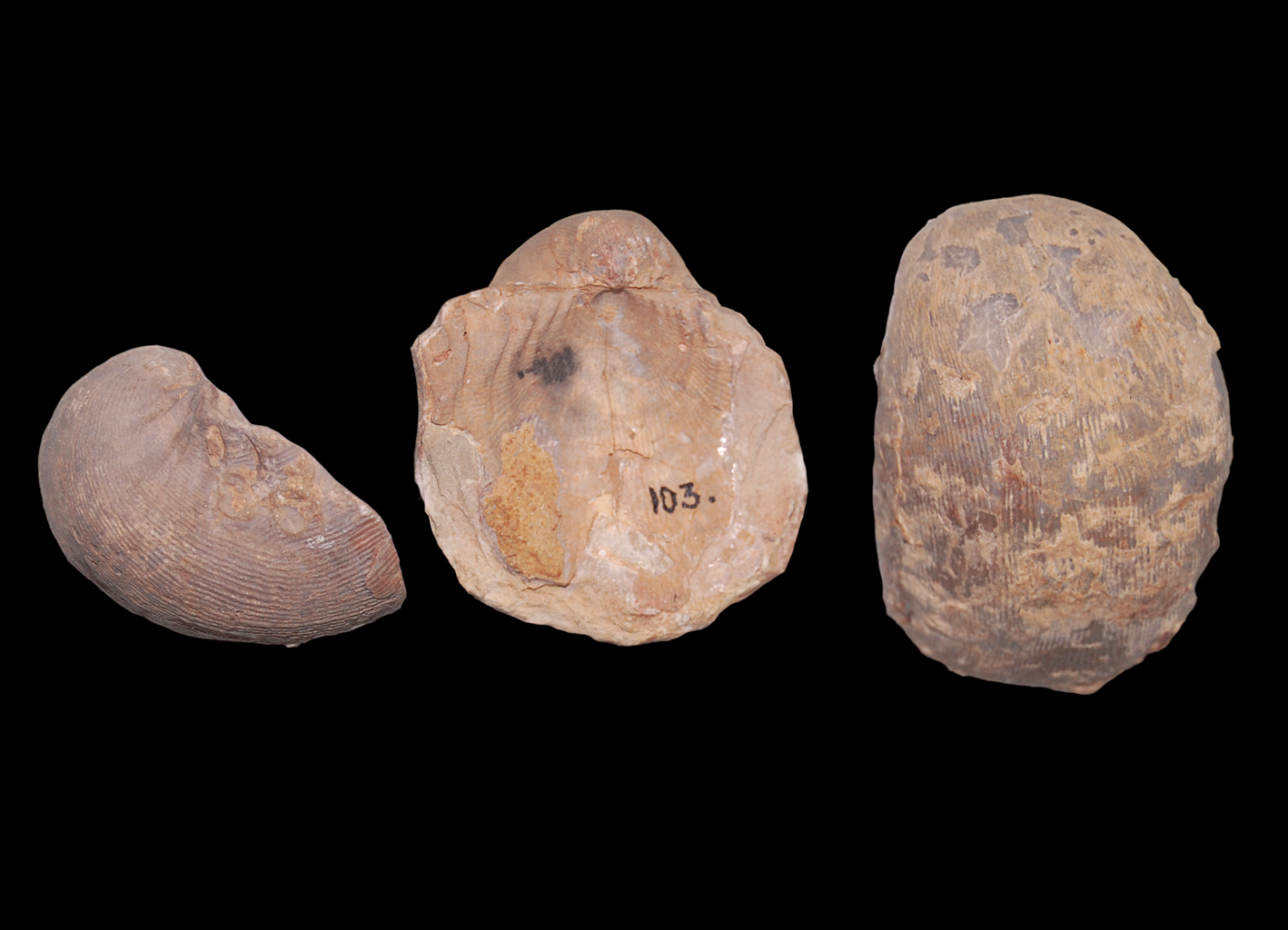
- Fossil of Linoproductus at the Oxford University Museum of Natural History

Scientific classification
- Kingdom: Animalia
- Phylum: Brachiopoda
- Class: †Strophomenata
- Order: †Productida
- Superfamily: †Linoproductoidea
- Family: †Linoproductidae; Stehli, 1954

Subgroups
- Anidanthinae; Linispininae; Linoproductinae; Paucispinauriinae; Siphonosiinae

= Linoproductidae =

Linoproductidae Temporal range: Visean–Upper Permian

Family of marine lamp shells

Linoproductidae is an extinct family of brachiopods which lived during the Carboniferous and Permian periods. The family was widespread across marine habitats, with fossils having been found on all continents except Antarctica. Members of this family commonly lack dorsal spines, and are characterized in possessing a distinct trail and deep corpus cavity.
