= Anza trough =

Rift in Kenya that was formed in the Jurassic Period

Central African rifts: Anza trough to the southeast.

The Anza trough is a rift in Kenya that was formed in the Jurassic Period of the Mesozoic Era. The trough runs inland from the coast in the northwest direction.

The trough is an isolated graben originating from the uprising mantle-plume rift forming processes. It is not connected to the East Kenya Jurassic triple junction but temporally associated with the CARS formed during the initial stretching phase when Gondwana was breaking up. The rift was formed by the same forces that created the rift system in South Sudan, and connects those rifts to the Lamu embayment further to the south. The separation of the other two arms of the junction allowed India-Madagascar to separate from Africa. The trough is now hidden by a cover of Quaternary sediments and volcanic rocks.
