= Lexington Limestone =

Geologic formation in Kentucky, United States

- Stratigraphic range: Late Ordovician, 454–451 Ma
- Type: Formation
- Sub-units: 11 members
- Underlies: Clays Ferry Formation
- Overlies: High Bridge Group
- Thickness: Around 320 feet in core regions, thins to around 200 feet northward and southward

Lithology
- Primary: Limestone
- Other: Shale

Location
- Region: Kentucky
- Country: United States

Type section
- Named for: Lexington, Kentucky
- Named by: M. R. Campbell
- Year defined: 1898

The Lexington Limestone is a prominent geologic formation that constitutes a large part of the late Ordovician bedrock of the inner Bluegrass region in Kentucky. Named after the city of Lexington, the geologic formation has heavily influenced both the surface topography and economy of the region.

It overlies the approximately Middle to Late Ordovician High Bridge Group, which is only exposed in some valleys of the Kentucky River, and underlies the Clays Ferry Formation. Since the time of its deposition spans several million years which were accompanied by constant sea level and topographical changes, the lithology of the Lexington Limestone varies significantly with geographic location and stratigraphic position within the rock column. Due to this, it is divided into 11 sub-units which sometimes complexly grade into and intertongue with each other. The formation is largely composed of limestone, however shale is also usually present in varying amounts, and in some sub-units is dominant.

== Geological setting ==
Around 450 million years ago, during the Late Ordovician period, much of what is now eastern Kentucky was a shallow, tropical carbonate platform located on the southern fringes of Laurentia since the craton was rotated around 45 degrees clockwise compared to its modern position. As a result of the ongoing Taconic orogeny, the region was cut off from the mainland by the deep Sebree trough. The trough served as a passage for cold, nutrient-rich oceanic water from the Iapetus Ocean, which would mix with the warm surface waters of the surrounding carbonate platforms, enabling a large number of bryozoan-brachiopod-echinoderm patch reefs to develop throughout the area. Hence, several parts of the Lexington Limestone are characteristically rich in fossil content.

In preceding periods, particularly during the deposition of the Tyrone Limestone, most of the region was covered in tidal mudflats due to low sea levels. The lower parts of the Lexington Limestone, the Curdsville and Logana members, are characterized by the continuous encroachment of the sea onto the vast tidal flats, culminating in a period where much of the platform was too deep for an adequate supply of oxygen to be retained or for photosynthesis to be performed effectively.

Eventually, however, water levels began to fall, and a plethora of ecological environments emerged, ranging from extremely shallow and turbulent sandbars, through mid-depth waters highly suitable for patch reef development, to dark, anoxic depressions in the terrain. Each of these environments facilitated the deposition of distinct facies of varying lithological characters. Due to the lack of significant sources of terrigenous sediments, most sedimentary material was supplied through carbonate production of the local ecosystem.

== Subdivisions ==
=== Curdsville Limestone ===
The Curdsville Limestone Member is the oldest and lowermost member of the Lexington formation. It was deposited as the sea level rose and transgressed across the tidal flats that dominated the region during the deposition of the preceding Tyrone Limestone. It is predominately composed of calcarenite initially deposited in turbulent, shallow water, but as the water column deepened, grain sizes became increasingly smaller. Due to heavy wave action, most organic debris in the lower part of the formation was broken up and heavily altered, making fossils rare and of poor quality. However, due to calmer conditions, fossils become more common in the upper parts of the member, when the water was not deep enough to be anoxic, but too deep for most wave-action. Whole and broken silicified fossils of brachiopods and gastropods are known, along with the occasional bivalve or trilobite.

=== Logana Member ===
The Logana Member was deposited during the time when the earlier deepening trend of the sea level reached its apex. It consists of an alternation of fine limestone and shale, with winnowed organic debris periodically arriving from shallower waters and covering a terrigenous, muddy substrate that continuously accumulated in the deep waters. The water level was normally too deep to provide an adequate supply of oxygen, hence fossils are rare, and mostly restricted to Cryptolithus trilobites (which are characteristic of deep-water environments). However, periodic improvements to the oxygen supply of the area resulted in the formation of shell beds when brachiopods of the species Dalmanella sulcata were able to gain a foothold. During longer periods of nondeposition, more complex ecological communities could form, as evidenced by the presence of limestones that progress upwards from low-diversity, whole fossil packstones to high-diversity grainstones.

Due to the region's topographical height compared to the surrounding landscape at the time, the Logana Member is absent around and southeast of Winchester since the area did not reach depths required for the shale's deposition. On the other hand, the member continuously thickens northward and westward as it approaches the deep waters of the former Sebree trough.

=== Grier Member ===
As sea levels began to fall, oxygen levels normalized throughout the platform, leading to a boom in biodiversity. Much of the Grier Member was deposited in waters with little wave action, so unabraded fossils of bryozoans and brachiopods are exceedingly abundant. Crinoids were also very common during the time of deposition, but few are preserved as complete fossils. The presence of gastropods with lime mud indicates that the environment was also highly rich in algae, while the lenticular and nodular structure of some beds point to an abundance of soft-bodied burrowing organisms which have not been fossilized. Rocks of the Grier Member also have an unusually high phosphate concentration - this was most likely due to the influx of nutrient-rich cold waters from the Sebree trough northwest, which was also a reason for the abundance of fauna throughout the member.

=== Tanglewood Member ===
The relative topographical uniformness of the region was disrupted after two linear horst-like blocks were uplifted around a central graben structure south of Versailles, Kentucky as a result of Taconic tectonism. Owing to their shallower depth compared to the surrounding landscape, tidal currents began to cause accretions of bioclastic debris to form on top of them, giving rise to two major shoal complexes.

These sandbars are today preserved as the Tanglewood Member - a complex formation of well-sorted limestone that makes up the bulk of the Lexington Limestone in the inner Bluegrass region. Most of the debris that makes up the Tanglewood member represents the broken and abraded fragments of locally abundant calcified animals, mainly crinoids, brachiopods, bryozoans and ostracodes. Fragments of the bryozoan Constellaria teres, which was very common throughout the Lexington platform in general during the time period, constitute a substantial portion of the bioclastic material. In particular, where the Tanglewood member grades into the overlying Devils Hollow member, relatively intact thickets of C. teres and other bryozoans occur, in the so-called Constellaria beds.

The area of deposition of the Tanglewood has undergone several changes since the initial deposition of the member. Over time, due to rising sea levels or subsidence, the southwestern block came under deeper waters, as evidenced by the expansion of the shaley Brannon Member into the area. Later, an apparent reversal in the polarity of tectonic subduction at the Laurentia-Taconic boundary caused the entire horst-graben structure to invert - the formerly deep graben between the two Tanglewood horsts was raised, while the two horsts subsided, causing the area of deposition of the Tanglewood member to shift to the area previously associated with the Brannon member. This situation persisted until the end of Lexington time, when carbonate deposition in the area ended.

=== Brannon Member ===
Between the two Tanglewood horsts, an area of deeper water served as the environment of deposition for the Brannon Member. The unit is thickest in this area, reaching a thickness of about 6–8 meters, indicating that environmental conditions favorable to its deposition were present here for the longest amount of time. However, the Brannon Member was not limited purely to this graben structure - it gradually pinches out northeastward as well, and overlies the southwestern Tanglewood area, apparently as a result of its horst subsiding.

It lies atop a hardground that was rapidly flooded by waters coming from the western Sebree trough. The rocks themselves consist of calcareous shale interbedded with thin, micro-grained limestones representing storm deposits. Since the unit was deposited in between two active faults, earthquakes would occasionally cause soft deformation to the rocks.

=== Perryville Limestone Member ===
While most of the central and northern part of the inner Bluegrass region was dominated by usually turbulent, nutrient-rich waters and a relief dotted with shoals, the southwest was shallower, calmer and had a poorer supply of nutrients due to being cut off from the more agitated northern waters by the aforementioned chain of Tanglewood member calcarenite bars. Unlike the Grier member, the Perryville member lacks authigenic phosphate, as the area's supply of nutrients was cut off. Although the steadily rising salinity and lack of nutrients were unfavorable to many members of the local biota, molluscs and algae were abundant. Fossils of the enigmatic Tetradium, now believed to be a type of red algae, are common throughout the facies, and the algae Girvanella coats many of the fossils.

When the block underlying the southwest Tanglewood shoal zone sank, so too did the lagoons of the Perryvile Member. The formerly shallow, restricted waters gradually deepened and circulation improved, as evidenced by the Grier-like Cornishville bed, the topmost subunit of the member.

=== Sulphur Well Member ===
Once sea levels fell again, environmental conditions in the southwest became similar to those of the Grier Limestone and resulted in the deposition of the Sulphur Well Member. A notable characteristic that sets it apart from the Grier Limestone is the abundance of bryozoans, in particular the species Heterotrypa foliacea, which dominate the fossil content.

=== Devils Hollow Member ===
Following the aforementioned inversion of the horst-graben structure, the central graben was uplifted close to sea level. Once near the surface, a series of beaches began developing atop the block, which are today preserved as the Devils Hollow Member.

It consists of two distinct types of rock - gastropod coquinites and calcilulite-calcisiltite rock. The coquinites represent the beach deposits themselves, while the calcilulite-calcisiltite rock represents lagoons that developed in shallow depressions in the beach landscape, likely no deeper than a few meters.

=== Stamping Ground Member ===
A stratigraphic unit both underlain and overlain by the Tanglewood Member, the Stamping Ground Member is similar to the Millersburg unit, but is unconnected to it and stratigraphically lower. Deposited in relatively shallow waters, it is rich in stromatoporoids, particularly Labechia huronensis. Red algae and brachiopods are also present.

=== Millersburg Member ===
In the areas surrounding the Tanglewood shoals, conditions remained optimal for the existence of a relatively rich ecosystem. The Millersburg Member was deposited in these areas. In terms of fossil content, it is similar to the stratigraphically lower Grier Member, but is lithologically distinct due to having a much higher shale content. Shale is abundant due to a general increase in terrigenous sediment influx towards the end of Lexington time, rather than depth like in the Logana and Brannon members.

=== Strodes Creek Member ===
This member is rather bouldery, owing to its pinch-and-swell bedding, ball-and-pillow structure, and abundant stromatoporoids. Fossils of other fauna are also present, but only sporadically and in lesser numbers.
