= Weiningia =

Weiningia Temporal range: Cambrian - Recent

Scientific classification
- Kingdom: Animalia
- Phylum: Brachiopoda
- Class: Rhynchonellata
- Order: †Spiriferida
- Family: †Martiniidae
- Genus: †Weiningia; Jin & Liao, 1974

Synonyms
- Elenchus Gray, 1843

Extinct genus of brachiopods

Weiningia is the name of an extinct genus of brachiopods.

== See also ==
- List of brachiopod genera
