= Solvik Formation =

Geologic formation in Norway

- Stratigraphic range: Early Llandovery (Silurian)
- Type: Geological formation
- Sub-units: Myren Member; Spirodden Member; Leangen Member; Padda Member

Location
- Country: Norway

The Solvik Formation is a geologic formation in the central Oslo Region of Norway. It preserves fossils dating back to the early Silurian period.

== Fossil content ==
Brachiopods
| Genus | Species | Presence | Material | Notes | Images |
|---|---|---|---|---|---|
| ?Anabaria | | Leangen Member. | 2 valves. | | |
| Atrypina | | Leangen Member. | 2 shells. | | |
| ?Becscia | ?B. pentagona | Basal Myren Member. | | | |
| Clintonella | C. aprinis | "32.5 m above the base of the Leangen Member". | Molds. | | |
| Cryptothyrella | | Top of the Leangen Member at Jongsåsveien. | A pedicle valve. | | |
| Eisaella | E. minuta | Upper Myren Member and Leangen Member. | | | |
| Eisaella | E. uniplicata | "From basal Myren Member up to 55 m above the base". | | | |
| ?Glassia | ?G. sp. | | "Only one well-preserved specimen (PMO 87.601)". | | |
| Hindella | H. kiaeri | * 3–4 meters above the base of the formation at one locality at Bekkestua, in Bærum.: 3 meters and 8 meters above the base of the formation at Konglungø and Vakås, respectively. | | Also occurs in the Langara Formation. | |
| Meifodia | M. prima ovalis | "Uppermost Myren and the lower parts of Padda members". | | | |
| Meifodia | M. prima prima | Near the base of the formation. | | A atrypid. | |
| Meifodia | M. subundata | Middle part of the formation. | | A atrypid. | |
| Thulatrypa | T. gregaria | Uppermost Leangen Member. | | | |
| Thulatrypa | T. huangi | Leangen Member. | | | |
| Thulatrypa | T. vikenensis | "8–10 m above the base of the Myren Member". | | | |
| Thulatrypa | ?T. sp. | Leangbukta and Skytterveien. | "PMO 113.698 (brachial mold), 153.873 (sectioned), 158.222, and 158.610, all whole valves". | A new species, may be assigned to another genus if more material becomes available. | |
| Shelvothyris | S. bivittata | 11 meters above the base of the Leangen Member. | | | |

== See also ==
- List of fossiliferous stratigraphic units in Norway
