= Tindouf Basin =

Tindouf Basin to the north of the West African Craton

The Tindouf Basin is a major sedimentary basin in West Africa, to the south of the Anti-Atlas region in Morocco. It stretches from west to east about 700 kilometres (430 mi) and covers about 100,000 square kilometres (39,000 sq mi), mostly in Algeria but with a western extension into Morocco and Western Sahara.

== Description ==
In the Ordovician period (490 Ma to 445 Ma) the area was an embayment sloping down from the West African Craton into the Tethys Ocean. It became a closed basin in the Late Carboniferous (320 Ma to 300 Ma). The basin has a steep northern edge against the Anti Atlas and more gently sloping southern edge. The basin is filled with up to 8 kilometres (5.0 mi) of sediment from the Cambrian and Carboniferous ages. These marine formations are overlain by a continental Cretaceous and Pliocene Hamada cover.

== Petroleum geology ==
The basin may have potential for oil and/or gas production, but has been largely unexplored (about 15 billion barrels and 3,000 km3 of gas). Most of these reserves are in Algeria.
