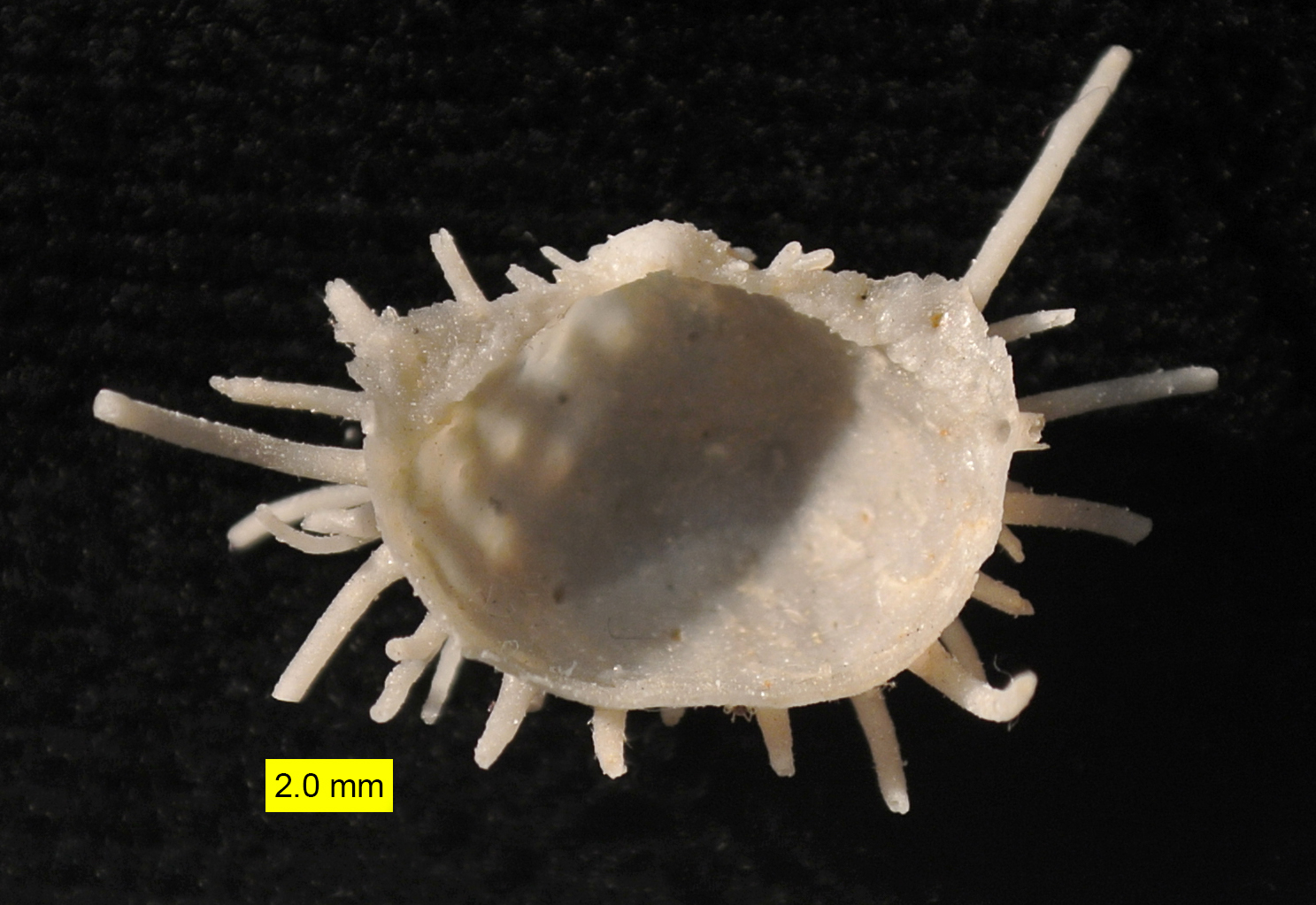
- Productid brachiopod ventral valve interior; Roadian, Guadalupian (Middle Permian); Glass Mountains, Texas.
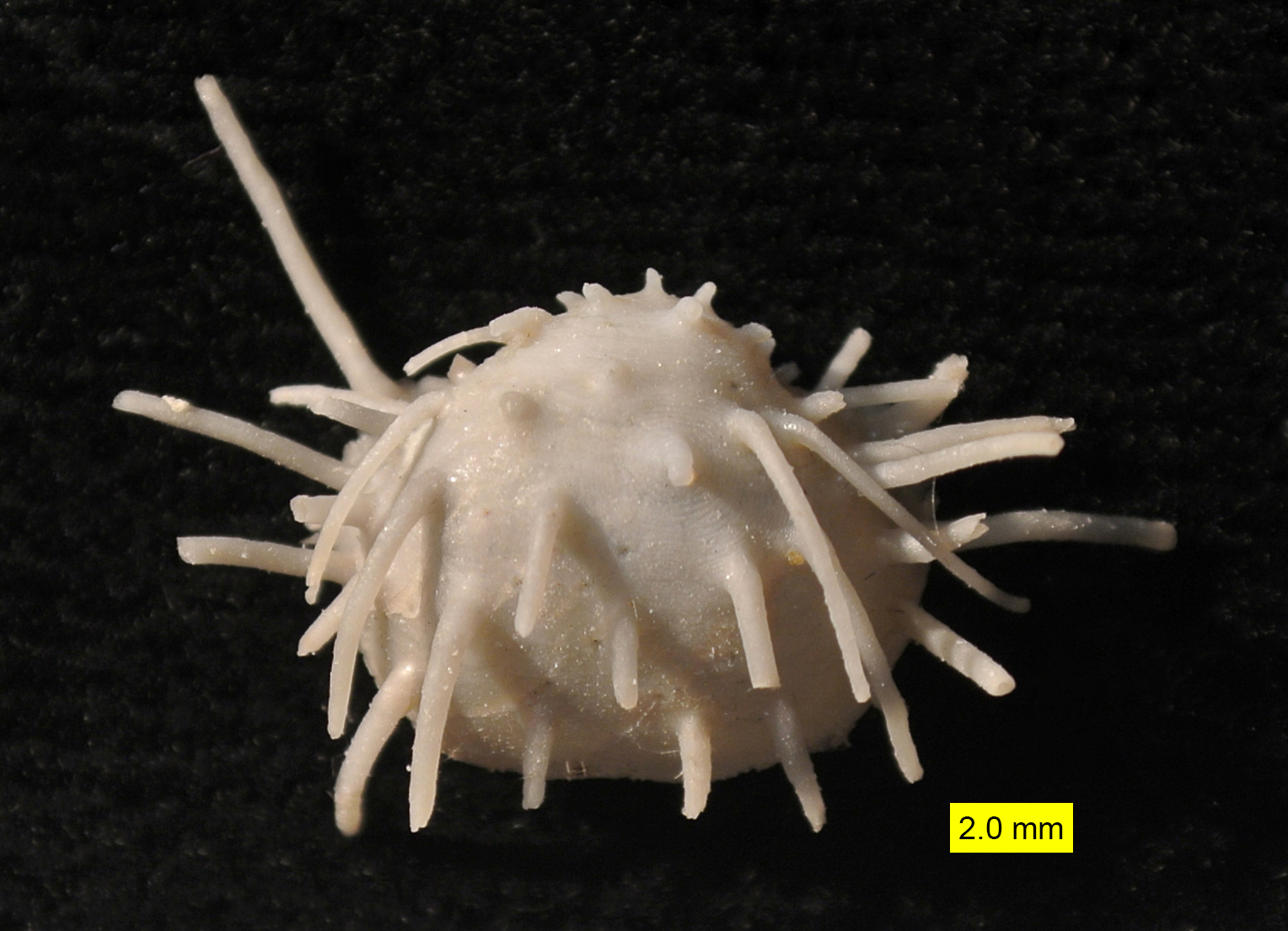
- Same shell in dorsal view

Scientific classification
- Kingdom: Animalia
- Phylum: Brachiopoda
- Class: †Strophomenata
- Order: †Productida; Sarytcheva & Sokolskaya, 1959

Suborders
- †Chonetidina; †Lyttoniidina; †Productidina; †Strophalosiidina

= Productida =

Productida Temporal range: Silurian–Early Triassic

Extinct order of brachiopods

Productida is an extinct order of brachiopods in the extinct class Strophomenata. Members of Productida first appeared during the Silurian. They represented the most abundant group of brachiopods during the Permian period, accounting for 45-70% of all species. The vast majority of species went extinct during the Permian-Triassic extinction event, though a handful survived into the Early Triassic. Many productids are covered in hollow tubular spines, which are characteristic of the group. A number of functions for the spines have been proposed, including as a defensive mechanism against predators.

== Taxonomy ==
Following the Treatise

- Suborder Chonetidina
  - Superfamily Chonetoidea
    - Family Strophochonetidae
    - Family Chonostrophiidae
    - Family Anopliidae
    - Family Eodevonariidae
    - Family Chonetidae
    - Family Rugosochonetidae
    - Family Daviesiellidae
- Suborder Productidina
  - Superfamily Productoidea
    - Family Productellidae
    - Family Productidae
  - Superfamily Echinoconchoidea
    - Family Echinoconchidae
    - Family Sentosiidae
  - Superfamily Linoproductoidea
    - Family Linoproductidae
    - Family Monticuliferidae
    - Family Shrenkiellidae
- Suborder Strophalosiidina
  - Superfamily Strophalosioidea
    - Family Strophalosiidae
    - Family Chonopectidae
    - Family Araksalosiidae
  - Superfamily Aulostegoidea
    - Family Aulostegidae
    - Family Cooperinidae
    - Family Scacchinellidae
  - Superfamily Richthofenioidea
    - Family Richthofeniidae
    - Family Hercosiidae
    - Family Cyclacanthariidae
    - Family Gemmellaroiidae
- Suborder Lyttoniidina
  - Superfamily Lyttonioidea
    - Family Lyttoniidae
    - Family Rigbyellidae
  - Superfamily Permianelloidea
    - Family Permianellidae
