= 2016 in paleontology =

Paleontology or palaeontology is the study of prehistoric life forms on Earth through the examination of plant and animal fossils. This includes the study of body fossils, tracks (ichnites), burrows, cast-off parts, fossilised feces (coprolites), palynomorphs and chemical residues. Because humans have encountered fossils for millennia, paleontology has a long history both before and after becoming formalized as a science. This article records significant discoveries and events related to paleontology that occurred or were published in the year 2016.

== Flora ==
=== Fungi ===
Name	Novelty	Status	Authors	Age	Unit	Location	Notes	Images
Cultoraquaticus	Gen. et sp. nov	Valid	Strullu-Derrien in Strullu-Derrien et al.	Early Devonian	Rhynie chert	United Kingdom	A fungus belonging to the group Chytridiomycetes. The type species is C. trewini.	
Dennisiellinites	Gen. et sp. nov	Valid	Bannister, Conran & Lee	Eocene	Pikopiko Fossil Forest	New Zealand	A fungus. Genus includes new species D. pikopikoensis .	
Gerontomyces	Gen. et sp. nov	Valid	Poinar	Eocene	Baltic amber	Europe (Baltic Sea coast)	A gilled mushroom. The type species is G. lepidotus.	
Hypoxylonites foyelensis	Sp. nov	Valid	Bianchinotti, Martínez & Saxena in Martínez et al.	Paleogene (probably Eocene)	Troncoso Formation	Argentina	A fungus described on the basis of spores.	
Monodictysporites	Gen. et sp. nov	Valid	Klymiuk	Ypresian	Allenby Formation; Princeton Chert	Canada (British Columbia)	A ascomycotan fungal spore taxon. The type species is M. princetonensis. Likely hosted on Dennstaedtiopsis aerenchymata	
Paleocadus	Gen. et sp. nov	Valid	Poinar	Cretaceous	Burmese amber	Myanmar	An Eccrinaceous fungus. Type species P. burmiticus.	
Pluricellaesporites patagonicus	Sp. nov	Valid	Bianchinotti, Martínez & Saxena in Martínez et al.	Paleogene		Argentina	A fungus described on the basis of spores resembling those of members of the genus Bactrodesmium.	
Trewinomyces	Gen. et sp. nov	Valid	Krings, Taylor & Martin	Early Devonian	Rhynie chert	United Kingdom	A fungus of uncertain phylogenetic placement, showing similarities to Macrochytrium (Chytridiomycota) and Blastocladiella (Blastocladiomycota) species. The type species is T. annulifer.	

== Cnidarians ==
=== Research ===
- Yunnanoascus haikouensis, previously thought to be a member of Ctenophora, is reinterpreted as a crown-group medusozoan by Han et al. (2016).
- A study on the fossil corals from the Late Triassic (Norian) outcrops in Antalya Province (Turkey), indicating that the corals lived in symbiosis with photosynthesizing dinoflagellate algae, is published by Frankowiak et al. (2016).

=== New taxa ===
Name	Novelty	Status	Authors	Age	Unit	Location	Notes	Images
Aphyllum pachystele	Sp. nov	Valid	Munson & Jell	Silurian (late Wenlock)	Jack Formation	Australia	A rugose coral belonging to the family Tryplasmatidae.	
Aulokoninckophyllum potyi	Sp. nov	Valid	Somerville, Rodríguez & Said	Carboniferous	Azrou-Khenifra Basin	Morocco	An aulate coral.	
Axuolites higoensis	Sp. nov	Valid	Niko	Silurian (Ludlow)	Fukami Formation	Japan	A tabulate coral belonging to the order Favositida and the family Coenitidae.	
Bjarmia	Gen. et sp. nov	Valid	Grazhdankin	Late Ediacaran (~550 Ma)	Erga Formation	Russia	A jellyfish-like organism, a possible relative of scyphomedusae. Genus includes new species B. cycloplerusa.	
Byronia jaegeri	Sp. nov	Valid	Vinn et al.	Ordovician (Katian)		Estonia	A possible thecate scyphozoan.	
Calceola collini	Sp. nov	Valid	Wright, Plusquellec & Gourvennec	Devonian (Eifelian)	Saint-Fiacre Formation	France	An operculate coral belonging to the family Calceolidae; a species of Calceola.	
Cambroctoconus coreaensis	Sp. nov	Valid	Park et al.	Cambrian	Daegi Formation	South Korea	A stem-cnidarian.	
Caninophyllum charli	Sp. nov	Valid	Denayer	Carboniferous (Tournaisian)	Yılanlı Formation	Turkey	A rugose coral belonging to the family Bothrophyllidae; a species of Caninophyllum.	
Cystodactylon	Gen. et sp. nov	Valid	Denayer & Webb	Carboniferous (Tournaisian)	Gudman Formation	Australia	A rugose coral. Genus includes new species C. orbum.	
Dokophyllum hillae	Sp. nov	Valid	Munson & Jell	Silurian (Ludfordian)	Jack Formation	Australia	A rugose coral belonging to the family Ketophyllidae.	
Edaphophyllum zhaotongense	Sp. nov	Valid	Liao & Ma	Devonian (Emsian)		China	A rugose coral.	
Eoaequorea	Gen. et sp. nov	Valid	Tang et al.	Ediacaran	Doushantuo Formation	China	A member of Hydrozoa of uncertain phylogenetic placement. The type species is Eoaequorea xingi.	
Eosiderastrea	Gen. et comb. et 2 sp. nov	Valid	Löser	Cretaceous (late Valanginian to Santonian)		Austria; France; Germany; Greece; Iran; Italy; Japan; Mexico; Poland; Spain; Ukraine; United States; Uzbekistan	A stony coral belonging to the family Siderastreidae. The type species is "Siderastrea" cuyleri Wells (1932); genus also includes "Phyllocoenia" cotteaui Orbigny (1850), "Diploastrea" crassa Kuzmicheva (1980), "Diploastrea" crassicostata Morycowa & Masse (1998), "Phyllocoenia" cyclops Felix (1891), "Confusastrea" dollfusi Prever (1909), "Confusastrea" felixi Prever (1909); "Stephanocoenia" grandipora Orbigny (1849), "Diploastrea" harrisi Wells (1932), "Diploastrea" hilli Wells (1933), "Montastraea" nagaoi Eguchi (1951), "Pleurocora" reussi Milne Edwards (1857), "Diplocoenia" splendida Prever (1909), "Diploastrea" vaughani Wells (1933) and "Plesiofavia" villaltai Reig Oriol (1991), as well as new species E. paragrandipora Löser (2016) and E. stefani Löser (2016).	
Famastraea	Gen. et sp. nov	Valid	Berkowski, Zapalski & Wrzołek	Devonian (Famennian)		Poland	A coral belonging to the group Rugosa and the family Campophyllidae. The type species is Famastraea catenata.	
Fomichevella najafi	Sp. nov	Valid	Badpa et al.	Carboniferous (Bashkirian)	Sardar Formation	Iran	A member of Rugosa belonging to the group Stauriida and the family Kleopatrinidae.	
Gertholites haikawai	Sp. nov	Valid	Niko & Fujikawa	Early Carboniferous	Akiyoshi Limestone Group	Japan	A tabulate coral.	
Gerviphyllum	Gen. et comb. nov	Valid	Wright, Plusquellec & Gourvennec	Early Devonian (likely late Lochkovian to early Pragian)		France	An operculate coral belonging to the family Calceolidae; a new genus for "Calceola" gervillei Bayle (1878).	
Gudmania	Gen. et sp. nov	Valid	Denayer & Webb	Carboniferous (Tournaisian)	Gudman Formation	Australia	A rugose coral. Genus includes new species G. darumbalae.	
Heintzella fluegeli	Sp. nov	Valid	Badpa et al.	Carboniferous (Bashkirian)	Sardar Formation	Iran	A member of Rugosa belonging to the group Stauriida and the family Kleopatrinidae.	
Kullingia rotadiscopsis	Sp. nov	Valid	Tang et al.	Ediacaran	Doushantuo Formation	China	A member of Hydrozoa of uncertain phylogenetic placement; a species of Kullingia.	
Madrepora mitsukurii	Sp. nov	Valid	Niko, Suzuki & Taguchi	Miocene	Katsuta Group	Japan	A madrepore.	
Marekostragulum grafi	Sp. nov	Valid	Plusquellec, Galle & Franke	Devonian (Emsian)		Germany	A tabulate coral belonging to the family Hyostragulidae.	
Mesoconularia (?) lukesi	Sp. nov	Valid	Mergl, Ferrova & Frýda	Devonian (late Emsian)	Suchomasty Limestone	Czech Republic	A member of Conulariida, possibly a species of Mesoconularia.	
?Michelinia vinni	Sp. nov	Valid	Zapalski, Berkowski & Wrzołek	Devonian (late Famennian)		Poland	A tabulate coral belonging to the family Micheliniidae; possibly a species of Michelinia.	
Multicarinophyllum vepreculatum	Sp. nov	Valid	Munson & Jell	Silurian (Ludfordian)	Jack Formation	Australia	A rugose coral belonging to the family Amsdenoididae.	
Oligophylloides maroccanus	Sp. nov	Valid	Weyer	Devonian (late Famennian)		Morocco	A member of Heterocorallia.	
Palaeosiderofungia	Gen. et comb. nov	Valid	Löser	Cretaceous (Aptian to Santonian)		Austria; Czech Republic; France; Germany; Greece; Serbia	A stony coral belonging to the family Siderastreidae; a new genus for "Thamnasteria" exigua Reuss (1854).	
Parostragulum	Gen. et sp. nov	Valid	Plusquellec, Galle & Franke	Devonian (Emsian)		Germany	A tabulate coral belonging to the family Hyostragulidae. The type species is P. problematicum.	
Pleurodictyum goldfussi	Sp. nov	Valid	Plusquellec & Franke	Devonian (Emsian)	Wiltz Beds	Germany; Luxembourg	A tabulate coral belonging to group Favositida and to the family Micheliniidae.	
Pleurodictyum pruemensis	Sp. nov	Valid	Plusquellec & Franke	Devonian (Emsian)	Wiltz Beds	Germany	A tabulate coral belonging to group Favositida and to the family Micheliniidae.	
Potyphyllum	Gen. et comb. nov	Valid	Coen-Aubert	Devonian (late Frasnian)		Belgium; Czech Republic; France; Germany; Poland; Russia; United Kingdom	A rugose coral belonging to the family Phillipsastreidae. The type species is "Cyathophyllum" ananas Goldfuss (1826); genus also includes "Pseudoacervularia" dybowskii Różkowska (1953), "Pseudoacervularia" intercellulosa (Phillips, 1841) sensu Pickett (1967), "Schlüteria" lyskovensis Ermakova (1957), "Acervularia" macrommata Roemer (1855), "Phillipsastrea" plantana Różkowska (1979), "Cyathophyllum" profundum Michelin (1845), "Phillipsastrea" rozkowskae Scrutton (1968), "Pseudoacervularia" cf. smithi (Różkowska, 1953) sensu Pickett (1967), "Phillipsastrea" ananas veserensis Coen-Aubert (1974) and "Phillipsastrea" zerda Galle, 1992 in Hladil et al. (1992).	
Preisingerella	Gen. et sp. nov	Valid	Kossovaya, Novak & Weyer	Early Permian		Slovenia	A coral similar to members of the genus Caninia. The type species is P. stegovnikensis.	
Ptychophyllum variatum	Sp. nov	Valid	Munson & Jell	Silurian (late Gorstian to Ludfordian)	Jack Formation	Australia	A rugose coral belonging to the family Ptychophyllidae.	
Pycnostylus polyphyllodus	Sp. nov	Valid	Munson & Jell	Silurian (late Wenlock)	Jack Formation	Australia	A rugose coral belonging to the family Pycnostylidae.	
Sokolovia	Gen. et sp. nov	Junior homonym	Tsyganko	Late Devonian (Famennian)		Russia (Komi Republic)	A tabulate coral belonging to the family Pachyporidae. The type species is Sokolovia pershinae. The generic name is preoccupied by Sokolovia Ilovaisky (1934) and Sokolovia Shishkinskaya (1964).	
Spinaxon	Gen. et sp. nov	Valid	Weyer	Devonian (late Frasnian)		France; Germany	A member of Rugosa belonging to the family Petraiidae. The type species is Spinaxon potyi.	
Syringopora hilarowiczi	Sp. nov	Valid	Zapalski, Berkowski & Wrzołek	Devonian (late Famennian)		Poland	A tabulate coral belonging to the family Syringoporidae; a species of Syringopora.	
Syringopora kowalensis	Sp. nov	Valid	Zapalski, Berkowski & Wrzołek	Devonian (late Famennian)		Poland	A tabulate coral belonging to the family Syringoporidae; a species of Syringopora.	
Talfania	Gen. et sp. nov	Valid	Peel & McDermott	Ordovician (Katian)	Sholeshook Limestone Formation	United Kingdom	A solitary coral. The type species is Talfania calicula.	
Thamnoptychia mistiaeni	Sp. nov	Valid	Zapalski, Berkowski & Wrzołek	Devonian (late Famennian)		Poland	A tabulate coral belonging to the family Pachyporidae; a species of Thamnoptychia.	
Turbinolia (Turbinolia) deformis	Sp. nov	Valid	Berezovsky in Berezovsky & Berezovsky	Eocene		Ukraine	A stony coral.	
Turbinolia (Turbinolia) emendata	Sp. nov	Valid	Berezovsky in Berezovsky & Berezovsky	Eocene		Ukraine	A stony coral.	
Utaratuia yunnanensis	Sp. nov	Valid	Liao & Ma	Devonian (Eifelian)		China	A rugose coral.	
Vassiljukia	Gen. et comb. nov	Valid	Denayer & Ogar	Carboniferous (Viséan)		Turkey; Ukraine	A colonial rugose coral; a new genus for "Lithostrotion" columnariformis Vassiljuk (1960).	
Vesicospina	Gen. et sp. nov	Valid	Munson & Jell	Silurian (Ludfordian)	Jack Formation	Australia	A rugose coral belonging to the family Kyphophyllidae. The type species is V. julli.	
Vulykhia	Nom. nov	Valid	Doweld	Late Ordovician		Mongolia	An anthozoan belonging to the superfamily Heliolitoidea; a replacement name for Concavites Bondarenko & Minzhin (1981).	

== Bryozoans ==
Name	Novelty	Status	Authors	Age	Unit	Location	Notes	Images
Anisotrypa kjarkiensis	Sp. nov	Valid	Tolokonnikova	Carboniferous (Tournaisian)		Armenia	A bryozoan belonging to the group Trepostomata and the family Anisotrypidae.	
Beisselina skyscanica	Sp. nov	Valid	Koromyslova & Pakhnevich	Late Cretaceous (Campanian)		Belarus	A bryozoan belonging to the group Ascophora and the family Tessaradomidae; a species of Beisselina.	
Celleporaria pirabasensis	Sp. nov	Valid	Muricy et al.	Oligocene-Miocene	Pirabas Formation	Brazil	A bryozoan belonging to the group Cheilostomata and the family Lepraliellidae.	
Celleporaria triangulavicularis	Sp. nov	Valid	Muricy et al.	Oligocene-Miocene	Pirabas Formation	Brazil	A bryozoan belonging to the group Cheilostomata and the family Lepraliellidae.	
Dybowskiella hupehensiformis	Sp. nov	Valid	Ernst	Permian	Zongba Formation	China	A member of Cystoporata belonging to the family Fistuliporidae.	
Dyscritella lii	Sp. nov	Valid	Ernst	Permian	Zongba Formation	China	A member of Trepostomata belonging to the family Dystritellidae.	
Ehrhardina	Gen. et 2 sp. nov	Valid	Martha & Taylor	Late Cretaceous (Cenomanian)		France; Germany; United Kingdom	A bryozoan belonging to the group Flustrina and the family Onychocellidae. The type species is Ehrhardina voigti; genus also includes Ehrhardina pikeae.	
Eridotrypella danzikensis	Sp. nov	Valid	Tolokonnikova	Devonian (Famennian)		Azerbaijan	A bryozoan belonging to the group Trepostomata and the family Eridotrypellidae.	
Etherella tibetensis	Sp. nov	Valid	Ernst	Permian	Zongba Formation	China	A member of Cystoporata belonging to the family Etherellidae.	
Fistuliphragma moniliformis	Sp. nov	Valid	Mesentseva	Devonian (Emsian)		Russia	A bryozoan belonging to the group Cystoporida.	
Fistuliphragma sibirica	Sp. nov	Valid	Mesentseva	Devonian (Emsian)		Russia	A bryozoan belonging to the group Cystoporida.	
Fistulipora sakagamii	Sp. nov	Valid	Ernst	Permian	Zongba Formation	China; Thailand	A member of Cystoporata belonging to the family Fistuliporidae.	
Fistulipora salairiensis	Sp. nov	Valid	Mesentseva	Devonian (Emsian)		Russia	A bryozoan belonging to the group Cystoporida.	
Fistuliramus fasciculus	Sp. nov	Valid	Mesentseva	Devonian (Emsian)		Russia	A bryozoan belonging to the group Cystoporida.	
Fistulocladia cincinnata	Sp. nov	Valid	Mesentseva	Devonian (Emsian)		Russia	A bryozoan belonging to the group Cystoporida.	
Margaretta amplipora	Sp. nov	Valid	Sonar & Gaikwad	Cenozoic		India	An ascophoran belonging to the family Margarettidae.	
Margaretta guhai	Nom. nov	Valid	Sonar & Gaikwad	Cenozoic		India	An ascophoran belonging to the family Margarettidae.	
Margaretta hariparensis	Sp. nov	Valid	Sonar & Gaikwad	Cenozoic		India	An ascophoran belonging to the family Margarettidae.	
Metastenodiscus	Gen. et comb. nov	Valid	Ernst, Schäfer & Grant-Mackie	Late Triassic		New Caledonia; New Zealand	A trepostome bryozoan. A new genus for "Stenodiscus" zealandicus Schäfer & Grant-Mackie (1994) and "Stenodiscus" kawhiae Schäfer & Grant-Mackie (1994).	
Nikiforopora arpaensis	Sp. nov	Valid	Tolokonnikova	Carboniferous (Tournaisian)		Azerbaijan	A bryozoan belonging to the group Trepostomata and the family Stenoporidae.	
Pachydermopora grodnoensis	Sp. nov	Valid	Koromyslova & Pakhnevich	Late Cretaceous (Campanian)		Belarus	A bryozoan belonging to the group Ascophora and the family Tessaradomidae; a species of Pachydermopora.	
Petalotrypa myunkhbalaensis	Sp. nov	Valid	Tolokonnikova	Devonian (Famennian)		Azerbaijan	A bryozoan belonging to the group Trepostomata.	
Planicellaria walsariensis	Sp. nov	Valid	Sonar & Pawar	Cenozoic		India	A bryozoan belonging to the group Cheilostomata and the family Calloporidae.	
Protoretepora irregularis	Sp. nov	Valid	Ernst	Permian	Zongba Formation	China	A member of Fenestrata belonging to the family Polyporidae.	
Pyriporella charopadiensis	Sp. nov	Valid	Sonar & Pawar	Cenozoic		India	A bryozoan belonging to the group Cheilostomata and the family Calloporidae.	
Pyriporella vadsariensis	Sp. nov	Valid	Sonar & Pawar	Cenozoic		India	A bryozoan belonging to the group Cheilostomata and the family Calloporidae.	
Rectifenestella famenniensis	Sp. nov	Valid	Tolokonnikova	Devonian (Famennian)		Azerbaijan	A bryozoan belonging to the family Fenestellidae.	
Rectifenestella kadrluiensis	Sp. nov	Valid	Tolokonnikova	Devonian (Famennian)		Armenia	A bryozoan belonging to the family Fenestellidae.	
Stenophragmidium buckhornensis	Sp. nov	Valid	Ernst et al.	Carboniferous (Pennsylvanian)	Boggy Formation	United States (Oklahoma)		
Streblotrypa (Streblotrypa) heltzelae	Sp. nov	Valid	Ernst et al.	Carboniferous (Pennsylvanian)	Boggy Formation	United States (Oklahoma)		
Streblotrypa (Streblotrypa) parviformis	Sp. nov	Valid	Ernst	Permian	Zongba Formation	China	A member of Cryptostomata belonging to the family Hyphasmoporidae.	
Tabuliporella nakhichevanica	Sp. nov	Valid	Tolokonnikova	Carboniferous (Tournaisian)		Azerbaijan	A bryozoan belonging to the group Trepostomata and the family Crustoporidae.	
Tibetiporella	Gen. et sp. nov	Valid	Ernst	Permian	Zongba Formation	China	A member of Fenestrata belonging to the family Polyporidae. The type species is T. ornata.	
Timanotrypa australis	Sp. nov	Valid	Ernst	Permian	Noonkanbah Formation; Rat Buri Limestone; Zongba Formation	Australia; China; Thailand	A member of Cryptostomata belonging to the family Timanodictyidae.	
Zigzagopora	Gen. et sp. nov	Valid	Wilson & Taylor	Ordovician (Sandbian)	Bromide Formation	United States (Oklahoma)	A cyclostome bryozoan. Genus includes new species Z. wigleyensis.	

== Brachiopods ==
Name	Novelty	Status	Authors	Age	Unit	Location	Notes	Images
Acritosia ogamensis	Sp. nov	Valid	Tazawa et al.	Early Permian (Kungurian)	Nabeyama Formation	Japan		
Acrosaccus scutatus	Sp. nov	Valid	Percival in Percival et al.	Ordovician		Australia	A member of Discinidae.	
Alphaprotinus	Gen. et comb. nov	Valid	Waterhouse	Carboniferous and Permian	Holodninskaya Suite	Russia (Krasnoyarsk Krai)	A member of Spiriferida belonging to the superfamily Spiriferoidea and the family Neospiriferidae. The type species is "Tangshanella" byrangi Chernyak (1963); genus also includes A. taimyrica (Einor, 1939).	
Anathyris (Anathyris) calestiennensis	Sp. nov	Valid	Mottequin et al.	Devonian (Frasnian)	Nismes Formation	Belgium		
Angulispirifer	Gen. et comb. nov	Junior synonym	Waterhouse	Permian		Australia	A member of Spiriferida belonging to the superfamily Trigonotretoidea and the family Georginakingiidae. The type species is "Spirifer" phalaena Dana (1849). Lee et al. (2023) subsequently considered the genus Angulispirifer to be a junior synonym of the genus Sulciplica.	
Anisopleurella antiqua	Sp. nov	Valid	Popov, Kebriaee-Zadeh & Pour	Ordovician (Darriwilian)	Lashkarak Formation	Iran	A member of Strophomenida belonging to the family Sowerbyellidae.	
Apatobolus anoskelidion	Sp. nov	Valid	Percival in Percival et al.	Ordovician		Australia	A member of Obolidae.	
Apenosia	Gen. et comb. nov	Valid	Waterhouse	Devonian (Frasnian)		Australia	A member of Spiriferida belonging to the superfamily Ambocoelioidea and the family Ladjiidae. The type species is "Crurithyris" apena Veevers (1959).	
Atansoria australis	Sp. nov	Valid	Percival in Percival et al.	Ordovician		Australia	A member of Obolidae.	
Atryparia (Costatrypa) agricolae	Sp. nov	Valid	Halamski & Baliński in Baliński, Racki & Halamski	Devonian (Frasnian)		Poland	A member of Atrypidae.	
Aulacothyris maendlii	Sp. nov	Valid	Sulser	Middle Jurassic (Callovian)		Switzerland	A member of Terebratulida belonging to the family Zeilleriidae.	
Aulacothyris waikatoensis	Sp. nov	Valid	MacFarlan	Jurassic		New Zealand	A member of Terebratulida.	
Bellimurina fluctuosa	Sp. nov	Valid	Popov, Kebriaee-Zadeh & Pour	Ordovician (Darriwilian)	Lashkarak Formation	Iran	A member of Strophomenida belonging to the family Strophomenidae.	
Besnossoviella	Gen. et comb. nov	Valid	Waterhouse	Carboniferous	Kuznets Basin	Russia	A member of Spiriferida belonging to the superfamily Elythynoidea and the family Eomartiniopsidae. The type species is "Eomartiniopsis" glaberiformis Besnossova (1963).	
Biernatia pseudoplana	Sp. nov	Valid	Engelbretsen in Percival et al.	Ordovician		Australia	A member of Lingulata belonging to the family Biernatiidae.	
Biernatia wrighti	Sp. nov	Valid	Engelbretsen in Percival et al.	Ordovician		Australia	A member of Lingulata belonging to the family Biernatiidae.	
Biernatium minus	Sp. nov	Valid	Baliński in Baliński, Racki & Halamski	Devonian (Frasnian)		Poland	A member of Mystrophoridae.	
Bingleburria	Gen. et comb. nov	Valid	Waterhouse	Carboniferous	Bingleburra Formation	Australia	A member of Spiriferida belonging to the superfamily Martinioidea and the family Brachythyridae. The type species is Brachythyris" elliptica Roberts (1963).	
Biramus	Gen. et comb. nov	Junior homonym	Waterhouse	Carboniferous		Russia	A member of Spiriferida belonging to the superfamily Elitoidea and the family Condrathyridae. The type species is "Phricodothyris" mosquensis Ivanova (1960). The generic name is preoccupied by Biramus Oswald (1993).	
Buxtonia inexpletucosta	Sp. nov	Valid	Torres-Martínez & Sour-Tovar	Carboniferous (middle Pennsylvanian)	Ixtaltepec Formation	Mexico	A member of Productoidea.	
Canalilatus musculosus	Sp. nov	Valid	Percival, Engelbretsen & Peng	Cambrian	Huaqiao Formation	China	A lingulate brachiopod belonging to the family Zhanatellidae.	
Carteriopsis	Gen. et comb. nov	Valid	Waterhouse	Carboniferous		United States (Illinois)	A member of Spiriferida belonging to the superfamily Elythynoidea and the family Eomartiniopsidae. The type species is "Eomartiniopsis" kinderhookensis Carter (1988).	
Catatonaria	Gen. et comb. nov	Valid	Waterhouse	Permian		United States (Texas)	A member of Spiriferida belonging to the superfamily Elitoidea and the family Phricodothyridae. The type species is "Neophricadothyris" catatona Cooper & Grant.	
Centreplicatus	Gen. nov	Valid	Zeng，Zhang & Han in Zeng et al.	Ordovician (Hirnantian)		China	A member of Pentamerida belonging to the family Pentameridae.	
Cerasinella	Nom. nov	Valid	Copper	Silurian (Llandovery)	Merrimack Formation	Canada (Quebec)	An atrypoid brachiopod; a replacement name for Cerasina Copper (1995) (preoccupied).	
Chapinella belkovskensis	Sp. nov	Valid	Baranov, Sokiran & Blodgett	Devonian (Famennian)	Nerpalakhsk Formation	Russia (Sakha Republic)	A member of Rhynchonellida belonging to the family Pugnacidae.	
Chilcatreta	Gen. et sp. nov	Valid	Lavié & Benedetto	Ordovician (Darriwilian)	San Juan Formation	Argentina	A siphonotretid brachiopod. Genus includes new species C. tubulata.	
Collinusia	Gen. et comb. nov	Valid	Waterhouse	Devonian		United States	A member of Spiriferida belonging to the superfamily Cyrtioidea and the family Eospiriferidae. The type species is "Spinella" talenti Johnson (1970).	
Crickmayoria	Gen. et comb. nov	Valid	Waterhouse	Devonian		Canada (Alberta)	A member of Spiriferida belonging to the family Mucrospiriferidae. The type species is "Eleutherokomma" beardi Crickmay (1950).	
Crispithyris	Gen. et sp. nov	Valid	MacFarlan	Jurassic		New Zealand	A member of Terebratulida. Genus includes new species C. nauarchus.	
Cyrtina transcaucasica	Sp. nov	Valid	Gretchishnikova & Oleneva in Oleneva	Devonian (Givetian)		Azerbaijan	A member of Spiriferinida belonging to the family Cyrtinidae.	
Davidsonia enmerkaris	Sp. nov	Valid	Halamski in Baliński, Racki & Halamski	Devonian (Frasnian)		Poland	A member of Davidsoniidae.	
Dictyoclostus transversum	Sp. nov	Valid	Torres-Martínez & Sour-Tovar	Carboniferous (middle Pennsylvanian)	Ixtaltepec Formation	Mexico	A member of Productoidea.	
Disculina mancenidoi	Sp. nov	Valid	MacFarlan	Jurassic		New Zealand	A member of Terebratulida.	
Dolerorthis nadruvensis	Sp. nov	Valid	Paškevičius & Hints	Ordovician (Katian)		Lithuania	A member of Orthida belonging to the family Hesperorthidae.	
Dulankarella hyrcanica	Sp. nov	Valid	Popov, Kebriaee-Zadeh & Pour	Ordovician (Darriwilian)	Lashkarak Formation	Iran	A member of Strophomenida belonging to the family Leptellinidae.	
Dyoros (Lissosia) maya	Sp. nov	Valid	Torres-Martínez, Sour-Tovar & Barragán	Permian (Leonardian)	Paso Hondo Formation	Mexico		
Echinocoelia parva	Sp. nov	Valid	Baliński in Baliński, Racki & Halamski	Devonian (Frasnian)		Poland	A member of Ambocoeliidae.	
Engania	Gen. et comb. nov	Valid	Waterhouse	Carboniferous	Enga Sandstone	Australia	A member of Spiriferida belonging to the superfamily Elythynoidea and the family Eomartiniopsidae. The type species is "Eomartiniopsis" costata Roberts (1971).	
Eochonetes maearum	Sp. nov	Valid	Bauer & Stigall	Late Ordovician		United States (Wyoming)		
Eochonetes minerva	Sp. nov	Valid	Bauer & Stigall	Late Ordovician		United States (Texas)		
Eochonetes voldemortus	Sp. nov	Valid	Bauer & Stigall	Late Ordovician	Saturday Mountain Formation	United States (Idaho)		
Eoconulus puteus	Sp. nov	Valid	Engelbretsen in Percival et al.	Ordovician		Australia	A member of Lingulata belonging to the family Eoconulidae.	
Eolingularia	Gen. et comb. nov	Valid	Bitner & Emig	Carboniferous to Triassic		China; Russia; Spain	A member of Lingulata belonging to the group Lingulida and the family Lingulidae. The type species is "Lingularia" siberica Biernat & Emig (1993).	
Experilingula larga	Sp. nov	Valid	Percival, Engelbretsen & Peng	Cambrian	Huaqiao Formation	China	A member of Obolidae.	
Flexaria magna	Sp. nov	Valid	Torres-Martínez & Sour-Tovar	Carboniferous (middle Pennsylvanian)	Ixtaltepec Formation	Mexico	A member of Productoidea.	
Georginakingia aviculiformis	Sp. nov	Valid	Waterhouse	Permian (Guadalupian)	Malbina Formation	Australia	A member of Spiriferida belonging to the superfamily Trigonotretoidea and the family Georginakingiidae.	
Gibbospirifer nazeri	Sp. nov	Valid	Waterhouse	Carboniferous	Ettrain Formation	Canada (Yukon)	A member of Spiriferida belonging to the superfamily Spiriferoidea and the family Spiriferidae.	
Globiella kamiyassensis	Sp. nov	Valid	Tazawa	Permian (Wordian)		Japan		
Glossella cuyanica	Sp. nov	Valid	Lavié & Benedetto	Ordovician (Darriwilian)	San Juan Formation	Argentina		
Gondwanorthis	Gen. et comb. nov	Valid	Benedetto & Muñoz	Early Ordovician		Argentina; Iran	A plectorthoid brachiopod. A new genus for "Nanorthis" calderensis Benedetto (2007); genus also includes "Nanorthis" bastamensis Ghobadi Pour, Kebriaee-Zadeh & Popov (2011).	
Gowanella	Gen. et sp. nov	Valid	Hiller	Late Cretaceous (probably Maastrichtian)	Broken River Formation	New Zealand	A member of Terebratulida related to Ostreathyris. The type species is G. capralis.	
Grandispirifer qaidamensis	Sp. nov	Valid	Lee, Shi & Chen in Shi et al.	Carboniferous (Serpukhovian)	Huaitoulata Formation	China	A member of Spiriferoidea belonging to the family Spiriferidae.	
Gretchispirifer	Gen. et sp. nov	Valid	Oleneva	Devonian (Emsian–Eifelian)	Sharur Formation	Azerbaijan	A member of Spiriferida belonging to the family Adolfiidae. The type species is G. dagnensis.	
Gundaria	Gen. et sp. nov	Valid	Angiolini et al.	Permian		Tajikistan	The type species is G. insolita.	
Harperoides	Gen. et sp. nov	Valid	Baranov & Blodgett	Devonian (Pragian)	Soda Creek Limestone	United States (Alaska)	A member of Strophomenida belonging to the subfamily Mesodouvillininae. The type species is Harperoides alaskensis.	
Hemileurus politus	Sp. nov	Valid	Angiolini et al.	Permian		Tajikistan		
Holcothyris campbelli	Sp. nov	Valid	MacFarlan	Jurassic		New Zealand	A member of Terebratulida.	
Huaitakithyris	Gen. et sp. nov	Valid	Waterhouse	Permian (Changhsingian)	Huai Tak Formation	Thailand	A member of Spiriferida belonging to the superfamily Elitoidea and the family Condrathyridae. The type species is "Squamularia" postgrandis Waterhouse (1983).	
Hubeinomena	Gen. et sp. nov	Disputed	Zeng，Chen & Han in Zeng et al.	Ordovician (Hirnantian)		China	A member of Strophomenida belonging to the family Sinomenidae. Genus includes new species H. wangjiawanensis. Rong et al. (2019) considered it to be a junior synonym of Coolinia.	
Hustedia shumardi	Sp. nov	Valid	Torres-Martínez, Sour-Tovar & Barragán	Permian (Leonardian)	Paso Hondo Formation	Mexico		
Inflatia coodzavuii	Sp. nov	Valid	Torres-Martínez & Sour-Tovar	Carboniferous (late Mississippian, middle Pennsylvanian)	Ixtaltepec Formation	Mexico	A member of Productoidea.	
Iridistrophia (Flabellistrophia)	Subgen. et comb. sp. nov	Valid	Jansen	Devonian (late Emsian to Eifelian)		Germany; Venezuela?	A member of Chilidiopsidae; a subgenus of Iridistrophia. The type species is "Orthis" hipponyx Schnur (1851); the subgenus also includes new species Iridistrophia (Flabellistrophia) musculosa and possibly also "Orthis" undifera Schnur (1853) and Iridistrophia dendritica Benedetto (1984).	
Ishimia inflata	Sp. nov	Valid	Popov, Kebriaee-Zadeh & Pour	Ordovician (Darriwilian)	Lashkarak Formation	Iran	A member of Strophomenida belonging to the family Leptellinidae.	
Isogramma nakamurai	Sp. nov	Valid	Tazawa	Permian (Wordian)		Japan		
Jakutoproductus lenensis	Sp. nov	Valid	Makoshin	Early Permian		Russia		
Jakutoproductus talchanensis	Sp. nov	Valid	Makoshin	Early Permian		Russia		
Johnsononia	Gen. et comb. nov	Valid	Waterhouse	Devonian (Eifelian)		United States (Alaska)	A member of Spiriferida belonging to the superfamily Ambocoelioidea and the family Ambocoeliidae. The type species is "Verneuilia" langenstrasseni Blodgett & Johnson (1994).	
Junglelomia	Gen. et sp. nov	Valid	Waterhouse	Carboniferous (Kasimovian) to Permian (Sakmarian)	Jungle Creek Formation	Canada (Yukon)	A member of Spiriferida belonging to the superfamily Choristitoidea and the family Palaeochoristitidae. The type species is J. ursus.	
Khaophrikia	Gen. et sp. nov	Valid	Waterhouse	Permian (Roadian)	Rat Buri Limestone	Thailand	A member of Spiriferida belonging to the superfamily Elitoidea and the family Condrathyridae. The type species is T. ratburiensis.	
Kjaerina (Kjaerina) gondwanensis	Sp. nov	Valid	Colmenar	Ordovician (late Sandbian–Katian)	Gabian Formation; Glauzy Formation; Louredo Formation; Portixeddu Formation	France; Italy; Portugal	A rafinesquinid strophomenid brachiopod, a species of Kjaerina.	
Kjaerina (Villasina)	Subgen. et 3 sp. et comb. nov	Valid	Colmenar	Ordovician (Katian)	Cavá Formation; Gabian Formation; Portilla de Luna Limestones; Portixeddu Formation; Porto de Santa Anna Formation; Punta Serpeddi Formation; Rosan Formation	France; Italy; Portugal; Spain	A rafinesquinid strophomenid brachiopod, a subgenus of Kjaerina. The type species of the subgenus is Kjaerina (Villasina) pedronaensis; the subgenus also contains "Hedstroemina" almadenensis Villas (1995), as well as new species Kjaerina (Villasina) meloui and Kjaerina (Villasina) pyrenaica.	
Kletsia	Gen. et comb. nov	Valid	Waterhouse	Permian (Artinskian)	Wandagee Formation	Australia	A member of Spiriferida belonging to the superfamily Elitoidea and the family Toryniferidae. The type species is "Spirelytha" miloradovichi Archbold & Thomas (1984).	
Koneviella? fuscina	Sp. nov	Valid	Percival, Engelbretsen & Peng	Cambrian	Huaqiao Formation	China	A lingulate brachiopod belonging to the family Zhanatellidae.	
Krabispirifer	Gen. et comb. nov	Valid	Waterhouse	Permian	Ko Yao Noi Formation	Thailand	A member of Spiriferida belonging to the family Martiniidae. The type species is Spinomartinia" prolifica Waterhouse (1981).	
Kutchithyris challinori	Sp. nov	Valid	MacFarlan	Jurassic		New Zealand	A member of Terebratulida.	
Kutchithyris waitomoensis	Sp. nov	Valid	MacFarlan	Jurassic		New Zealand	A member of Terebratulida.	
Lacunites jaroslavi	Sp. nov	Valid	Mergl & Kraft	Early Ordovician	Klabava Formation	Czech Republic	A paterinate brachiopod.	
Lampazarorthis	Gen. et comb. et sp. nov	Valid	Benedetto & Muñoz	Early Ordovician		Argentina	A plectorthoid brachiopod. A new genus for "Eoorthis" bifurcata Harrington (1937); genus also includes "Nanorthis" brachymyaria Benedetto in Benedetto & Carrasco (2002), as well as new species Lampazarorthis alata.	
Lepidomena multiplicata	Sp. nov	Valid	Popov, Kebriaee-Zadeh & Pour	Ordovician (Darriwilian)	Lashkarak Formation	Iran	A member of Strophomenida belonging to the family Leptellinidae.	
Leptathyris gornensis	Sp. nov	Valid	Baliński in Baliński, Racki & Halamski	Devonian (Frasnian)		Poland	A member of Athyrididae.	
Liaous	Gen. et sp. nov	Valid	He & Chen in He et al.	Middle Triassic (early Anisian)	Xinyuan Formation	China	A relative of Mentzelia and Paramentzelia. The type species is Liaous shaiwensis.	
Loboidothyris awakinoensis	Sp. nov	Valid	MacFarlan	Jurassic		New Zealand	A member of Terebratulida.	
Loboidothyris grantmackiei	Sp. nov	Valid	MacFarlan	Jurassic		New Zealand	A member of Terebratulida.	
Loboidothyris marokopaensis	Sp. nov	Valid	MacFarlan	Jurassic		New Zealand	A member of Terebratulida.	
Longiusculus	Gen. et sp. nov	Valid	Waterhouse	Carboniferous (Viséan)		Japan	A member of Spiriferida belonging to the superfamily Paeckelmanelloidea and the family Strophopleuridae. The type species is L. yanagidai.	
Lyonia rochacamposi	Sp. nov	Valid	Taboada et al.	Early Permian (latest Asselian-earliest Sakmarian)	Taciba Formation	Brazil	A member of Productida belonging to the family Auriculispinidae, a species of Lyonia.	
Mandageryia	Gen. et comb. nov	Valid	Waterhouse	Devonian	Mandagery Park Formation	Australia	A member of Spiriferida belonging to the superfamily Delthyroidea and the family Xenomartiniidae. The type species is "Quadrathyris robusta" molongensis Savage (1969), raised to the rank of the species M. molongensis.	
Mendozotreta	Gen. et comb. nov	Valid	Holmer et al.	Ordovician	Antelope Valley Limestone; Lindero Formation	Argentina; United States (Nevada)	A member of Acrotretida belonging to the family Acrotretidae. The type species is "Conotreta" devota Krause & Rowell (1975).	
Mesoleptostrophia belli	Sp. nov	Valid	Earp	Early Devonian	Montys Hut Formation	Australia		
Minatodina	Gen. et comb. nov	Valid	Waterhouse	Devonian		Belgium	A member of Spiriferida belonging to the superfamily Reticularioidea and the family Thomasariidae. The type species is "Spirifer" maureri Holzapfel (1896).	
Minispinusuria	Gen. et comb. nov	Valid	Waterhouse	Carboniferous	Bingleburra Formation	Australia	A member of Spiriferida belonging to the superfamily Reticularioidea and the family Reticulariidae. The type species is "Thomasaria" voiseyi Roberts (1963).	
Minutella bulgarica	Sp. nov	Valid	Bitner & Motchurova-Dekova	Miocene (Badenian)		Bulgaria		
Minutomena	Gen. et sp. nov	Valid	Zeng，Zhang & Han in Zeng et al.	Ordovician (Hirnantian)		China	A member of the family Strophomenidae. Genus includes new species M. yichangensis.	
Minutorthis	Gen. nov	Valid	Zeng，Chen & Zhang in Zeng et al.	Ordovician (Hirnantian)		China	A member of Orthida belonging to the family Toxorthidae.	
Monelasmina montisjosephi	Sp. nov	Valid	Baliński in Baliński, Racki & Halamski	Devonian (Frasnian)		Poland	A member of Draboviidae.	
Nasakia	Gen. et sp. nov	Valid	Streng et al.	Cambrian	Henson Gletscher Formation	Greenland	A member of Rhynchonelliformea belonging to the class Obolellata and the order Naukatida. The type species is Nasakia thulensis.	
Nevadospirifer	Gen. et sp. nov	Valid	Waterhouse	Devonian		United States (Nevada)	A member of Spiriferida belonging to the superfamily Hysterolitoidea and the family Howellellidae. The type species is N. pulchrum.	
Numericoma rowelli	Sp. nov	Valid	Holmer et al.	Ordovician (Darriwilian)	Antelope Valley Limestone; Ponon Trehue Formation	Argentina; United States (Nevada)	A member of Lingulata belonging to the family Ephippelasmatidae.	
Nushbiella kleithria	Sp. nov	Valid	Percival in Percival et al.	Ordovician		Australia	A member of Lingulata belonging to the family Siphonotretidae.	
Obliquorhynchia	Gen. et comb. nov	Valid	Schrøder, Lauridsen & Surlyk	Paleocene (Danian)	Faxe Formation; Vigny Formation	Denmark; France; Sweden	A member of Rhynchonellida belonging to the superfamily Pugnacoidea and the family Basiliolidae; a new genus for "Terebratula" flustracea von Buch (1834).	
Orthis dehmollaensis	Sp. nov	Valid	Popov, Kebriaee-Zadeh & Pour	Ordovician (Darriwilian)	Lashkarak Formation	Iran	A member of Orthida belonging to the family Orthidae.	
Paramirorthis	Gen. et sp. nov	Disputed	Zeng，Wang & Peng in Zeng et al.	Ordovician (Hirnantian)		China	A member of the family Dalmanellidae. Genus includes new species P. minuta. Rong et al. (2019) considered it to be a junior synonym of Mirorthis.	
Paraspirifer (Laurentispirifer)	Subgen. et comb. nov	Valid	Jansen	Middle Devonian		United States; Venezuela	A subgenus of Paraspirifer. The type species is Paraspirifer conradi Godefroid & Fagerstrom (1983); the subgenus also includes "Delthyris" acuminata Conrad (1839), "Terebratula" acuminatissima de Castelnau (1843), "Spirifer" bownockeri Stewart (1927), Paraspirifer halli Godefroid & Fagerstrom (1983) and Paraspirifer clarkei Godefroid & Fagerstrom (1983).	
Paraspirifer (Mosellospirifer)	Subgen. et comb. nov	Valid	Jansen	Devonian (late Emsian to early Eifelian		Germany; Canada? China?	A subgenus of Paraspirifer. The type species is Paraspirifer sandbergeri Solle (1971); the subgenus also includes Spirifer auriculatus Sandberger & Sandberger (1856), Paraspirifer sandbergeri longimargo Solle (1971) (elevated to species rank), Paraspirifer eos Solle (1971) and Paraspirifer sandbergeri nepos Solle (1971). The subgenus might also include Paraspirifer gigantea Su (1976) and Paraspirifer desbiensi Bizzarro & Lespérance (1999).	
Parazhanatella	Gen. et sp. nov	Valid	Percival, Engelbretsen & Peng	Cambrian	Huaqiao Formation	China	A lingulate brachiopod belonging to the family Zhanatellidae. The type species is P. paibia.	
Pedderia	Gen. et sp. nov	Valid	Baranov & Blodgett	Devonian (Pragian)	Soda Creek Limestone	United States (Alaska)	A member of Rhynchonellida belonging to the family Pygmaellidae. The type species is Pedderia fragosa.	
Phragmorthis shahrudensis	Sp. nov	Valid	Popov, Kebriaee-Zadeh & Pour	Ordovician (Darriwilian)	Lashkarak Formation	Iran	A member of Orthida belonging to the family Phragmorthidae.	
Pliconodosus	Gen. et comb. nov	Valid	Waterhouse	Silurian		Sweden	A member of Spiriferida belonging to the superfamily Hysterolitoidea and the family Costispiriferidae. The type species is "Spirifer" schmidti Lindstrom (1861).	
Poletaevina	Gen. et comb. nov	Valid	Waterhouse	Carboniferous		Ireland; United Kingdom	A member of Spiriferida belonging to the superfamily Paeckelmanelloidea and the family Pterospiriferidae. The type species is "Spirifera" rhomboidea Phillips (1836); genus also includes "Spirifer" distans Sowerby (1825).	
Pristinusia	Gen. et comb. nov	Valid	Waterhouse	Carboniferous	Branch Creek Formation	Australia	A member of Spiriferida belonging to the superfamily Spiriferoidea and the family Spiriferidae. The type species is "Neospirifer" pristinus Maxwell (1951).	
Prospira pseudostruniana	Sp. nov	Valid	Mottequin & Brice	Devonian (late Famennian)	Etrœungt Formation	France	A member of Spiriferida belonging to the family Spiriferidae.	
Psygmakantha	Gen. et sp. nov	Valid	Percival in Percival et al.	Ordovician		Australia	A member of Lingulata belonging to the family Ephippelasmatidae. The type species is P. malachiensis.	
Pulvinoconcha	Gen. et sp. nov	Valid	Waterhouse	Permian	Cherry Canyon Formation	United States (Texas)	A member of Spiriferida belonging to the superfamily Elythynoidea and the family Eomartiniopsidae. The type species is P. getaway.	
Punctospirifer gerankalasus	Sp. nov	Valid	Oleneva	Carboniferous (Tournaisian)		Azerbaijan	A member of Spiriferinida belonging to the family Punctospiriferidae.	
Qaidamospirifer	Gen. et sp. nov	Valid	Chen, Lee & Shi in Shi et al.	Carboniferous (Serpukhovian)	Huaitoulata Formation	China	A member of Spiriferoidea belonging to the family Choristitidae. The type species is Q. elongatus.	
Radinovia	Gen. et comb. nov	Valid	Waterhouse	Devonian	Bingleburra Formation	Canada (Alberta)	A member of Spiriferida belonging to the superfamily Theodossioidea and the family Theodossiidae. The type species is "Vandergrachtella" radina Crickmay (1953).	
Rafinesquina (Mesogeina)	Subgen. et comb. et 2 sp. nov	Valid	Colmenar	Ordovician (Katian)	Bohdalec Formation; Fombuena Formation; Gabian Formation; Lower Ktaoua Formation; Porto de Santa Anna Formation; Upper Tiouririne Formation; Zahorany Formation	Czech Republic; France; Germany; Morocco; Portugal; Spain	A rafinesquinid strophomenid brachiopod, a subgenus of Rafinesquina. The type species of the subgenus is "Leptaena" pseudoloricata Barrande (1848); the subgenus also includes Rafinesquina pomoides Havlíček (1971), as well as new species Rafinesquina (Mesogeina) gabianensis and Rafinesquina (Mesogeina) loredensis.	
Rhipidomella magna	Sp. nov	Valid	Tazawa	Permian (Wordian)		Japan		
Rogorthis? oriens	Sp. nov	Valid	Popov, Kebriaee-Zadeh & Pour	Ordovician (Darriwilian)	Lashkarak Formation	Iran	A member of Orthida belonging to the family Orthidae.	
Sampo suduvensis	Sp. nov	Valid	Paškevičius & Hints	Late Ordovician		Lithuania; Russia (Kaliningrad Oblast)	A member of Strophomenida belonging to the family Leptestiidae.	
Sartenaerirhynchus	Gen. et comb. nov	Valid	Jansen	Devonian (middle Siegenian to late Emsian)		Belgium; Germany; Luxembourg	A member of Rhynchonellida belonging to the superfamily Uncinuloidea. The type species is "Terebratula" antiqua Schnur (1853); genus also includes "Uncinulus" frontecostatus Drevermann (1902)	
Scaphelasma quadratum	Sp. nov	Valid	Engelbretsen in Percival et al.	Ordovician		Australia	A member of Lingulata belonging to the family Scaphelasmatidae.	
Schizocrania equestra	Sp. nov	Valid	Mergl & Nolčová	Ordovician (Katian)	Bohdalec Formation	Czech Republic	A member of Discinoidea belonging to the family Trematidae.	
Septaliphoria felberi	Sp. nov	Valid	Sulser	Middle Jurassic (Callovian)		Switzerland	A member of Rhynchonellida belonging to the superfamily Hemithiridoidea and the family Cyclothyrididae.	
Septimusia	Gen. et comb. nov	Valid	Waterhouse	Carboniferous	Septimus Limestone	Australia	A member of Spiriferida belonging to the superfamily Choristitoidea and the family Choristitidae. The type species is "Tangshanella" fasciculatia Roberts (1971).	
Siberioproductus	Gen. et sp. nov	Valid	Baranov, Sokiran & Blodgett	Devonian (Famennian)	Chekursk Formation	Russia (Sakha Republic)	A member of Rhynchonelliformea belonging to the group Productida and the family Productellidae. The type species is S. boreus.	
Sinomena	Gen. et sp. nov	Disputed	Zeng，Chen & Han in Zeng et al.	Ordovician (Hirnantian)		China	A member of Strophomenida belonging to the family Sinomenidae. Genus includes new species S. typica. Rong et al. (2019) considered it to be a junior synonym of Eostropheodonta.	
Skenidioides cretus	Sp. nov	Valid	Halamski in Baliński, Racki & Halamski	Devonian (Frasnian)		Poland	A member of Skenidiidae.	
Spinobolus	Gen. et sp. nov	Valid	Zhang et al.	Cambrian	Shuijingtuo Formation	China	A linguloid brachiopod. The type species is Spinobolus popovi.	
Spirelytha svartevaegensis	Sp. nov	Valid	Waterhouse	Permian		Canada (Nunavut)	A member of Spiriferida belonging to the superfamily Elitoidea and the family Toryniferidae.	
Suchanaria	Gen. et comb. nov	Valid	Waterhouse	Devonian (Givetian, possibly Frasnian)		Australia	A member of Spiriferida belonging to the superfamily Ambocoelioidea and the family Rhynchospiriferidae. The type species is "Tingella" suchana Veevers (1959).	
Tapongaspirifer	Gen. et sp. nov	Valid	Earp	Early Devonian	Montys Hut Formation	Australia	A member of Spiriferida belonging to the family Filispiriferidae. The type species is Tapongaspirifer melodiae.	
Tasmanospirifer	Gen. et sp. et comb. nov	Valid	Waterhouse	Permian	Berriedale Limestone	Australia	A member of Spiriferida belonging to the superfamily Trigonotretoidea and the family Georginakingiidae. The type species is T. clarkei; genus also includes "Spirifer" tasmaniensis Morris (1845).	
Taungurungetes	Gen. et comb. nov	Valid	Earp	Early Devonian	Montys Hut Formation; Norton Gully Sandstone	Australia	A possible member of Devonochonetinae. The type species is "Chonetes" taggertyensis Gill (1945) from the Montys Hut Formation; genus also contains second, unnamed species from the Norton Gully Sandstone.	
Tegulospirifer ogilvieensis	Sp. nov	Valid	Waterhouse	Carboniferous	Ettrain Formation	Canada (Yukon)	A member of Spiriferida belonging to the superfamily Spiriferoidea and the family Spiriferidae.	
Terebratulina leeae	Sp. nov	Valid	MacFarlan	Jurassic		New Zealand	A member of Terebratulida.	
Terebratulina putiensis	Sp. nov	Valid	MacFarlan	Jurassic		New Zealand	A member of Terebratulida.	
Thaerodonta notabile	Sp. nov	Valid	Paškevičius	Ordovician (Katian)	Kaimynai Formation	Lithuania		
Thulatrypa	Gen. et sp. et comb. nov	Valid	Huang et al.	Silurian		China; Norway	An atrypoid brachiopod. The type species is Thulatrypa gregaria; genus also contains "Meifodia" orientalis Rong, Xu & Yang (1974).	
Tomteluva	Gen. et sp. nov	Valid	Streng et al.	Cambrian	Stephen Formation	Canada (British Columbia)	A member of Rhynchonelliformea belonging to the class Obolellata and the order Naukatida. The type species is Tomteluva perturbata.	
Trentingula	Gen. et 3 sp. et comb. nov	Valid	Posenato	Late Permian and Early Triassic		Hungary; Italy; United States (Wyoming)	A member of Linguloidea belonging to the family Lingulidae. The type species is T. lorigae; genus also includes new species T. mazzinensis and T. prinothi, as well as Trentingula borealis (Bittner, 1899).	
Triangulospirifer	Nom. nov	Valid	Lee in Shi et al.	Carboniferous		United Kingdom	A member of Spiriferida. A replacement name for Triangularia Poletaev (2001).	
Trimena	Gen. nov	Valid	Zeng，Wang & Peng in Zeng et al.	Ordovician (Hirnantian)		China	A member of Plectambonitoidea belonging to the family Xenambonitidae.	
Triramus	Gen. et sp. nov	Valid	Waterhouse	Permian (Asselian)	Jungle Creek Formation	Canada (Yukon)	A member of Spiriferida belonging to the superfamily Elitoidea and the family Condrathyridae. The type species is T. canadensis.	
Vasculumia	Gen. et comb. nov	Valid	Waterhouse	Permian	Ko Yao Noi Formation	Thailand	A member of Spiriferida belonging to the superfamily Trigonotretoidea and the family Angiospiriferidae. The type species is "Brachythyrina" boonlomi Waterhouse (2004).	
Veeversaria	Gen. et comb. nov	Valid	Waterhouse	Devonian (Frasnian)		Australia	A member of Spiriferida belonging to the superfamily Ambocoelioidea and the family Ladjiidae. The type species is "Emanuella" torrida Veevers (1959).	
Waddingtonia	Gen. et comb. nov	Valid	Waterhouse	Devonian	Delorme Formation	Canada (Yukon)	A member of Spiriferida belonging to the superfamily Reticularioidea and the family Reticulariidae. The type species is "Reticulariopsis" warreni Perry (1984).	
Weberproductus	Gen. et sp. nov	Valid	Torres-Martínez & Sour-Tovar	Carboniferous (middle Pennsylvanian)	Ixtaltepec Formation	Mexico	A member of Productoidea. Genus includes new species W. donajiae.	
Wenjukovispirifer	Gen. et comb. nov	Valid	Oleneva	Devonian (Famennian)		Russia	A member of Spiriferida belonging to the family Cyrtospiriferidae. The type species is "Spirifer" koscharicus Ljaschenko (1959); genus also includes "Spirifer" archiaci Murchison (1840), "Spirifer" brodi Wenjukov (1886) and W. lebedjanicus (Nalivkin, 1947).	
Xysticaria	Gen. et comb. nov	Valid	Waterhouse	Permian	Cathedral Mountain Formation	United States (Texas)	A member of Spiriferida belonging to the superfamily Elythynoidea and the family Eomartiniopsidae. The type species is "Rallacosta" xystica Cooper & Grant (1976).	
Yichangomena	Gen. et sp. nov	Disputed	Zeng，Zhang & Han in Zeng et al.	Ordovician (Hirnantian)		China	A member of Strophomenida belonging to the family Sinomenidae. Genus includes new species Y. dingjiapoensis. Rong et al. (2019) considered it to be a junior synonym of Eostropheodonta.	
Zeilleria opuatiaensis	Sp. nov	Valid	MacFarlan	Jurassic		New Zealand	A member of Terebratulida.	
Zeilleria waiohipaensis	Sp. nov	Valid	MacFarlan	Jurassic		New Zealand	A member of Terebratulida.	

== Echinoderms ==
Name	Novelty	Status	Authors	Age	Unit	Location	Notes	Images
Alternocidaris	Gen. et comb. nov	Valid	El Qot, Abdelhamid, & Abdelghany	Late Cretaceous (Cenomanian, possibly Turonian)		Egypt	A sea urchin belonging to the group Camarodonta and the family Glyphocyphidae. The type species is "Tiaridia" weldoni Fourtau (1921).	
Apatopygus? garciasanzi	Sp. nov	Valid	Forner	Early Cretaceous (Aptian)	Maestrat Basin	Spain	A sea urchin belonging to the family Apatopygidae.	
Applinocrinus russelli	Sp. nov	Valid	Gale	Late Cretaceous (Maastrichtian)	Prairie Bluff Formation	United States (Mississippi)	A crinoid belonging to the group Articulata and the family Saccocomidae.	
Apsidocrinus doreckae	Sp. nov	Valid	Konieczyński, Pisera & Fózy	Early Cretaceous		Hungary	A cyrtocrinid crinoid, a species of Apsidocrinus.	
Arabicodiadema	Gen. et comb. et sp. nov	Valid	Abdelhamid, El Qot & Abdelghany	Cretaceous (Albian to Cenomanian)		Oman; United Arab Emirates	A heterodiadematid sea urchin. The type species is "Trochodiadema" dhofarense Roman (1991); genus also includes new species Arabicodiadema alii.	
Atalopegaster	Gen. et sp. nov	Valid	Blake & Guensburg	Late Jurassic (Oxfordian)	Swift Formation	United States (Montana)	A starfish belonging to the family Stichasteridae. The type species is A. gundersoni.	
Bystrowicrinus (col.) depressus	Sp. nov	Valid	Donovan & Keighley	Late Silurian	West Point Formation	Canada (Quebec)	A crinoid.	
Calliderma lindneri	Sp. nov	Valid	Niebuhr & Seibertz	Late Cretaceous (Turonian)	Schmilka Formation	Germany	A starfish belonging to the family Goniasteridae, a species of Calliderma.	
Carolinaster	Gen. et sp. nov	Valid	Osborn, Mooi & Ciampaglio	Eocene	Castle Hayne Limestone	United States (North Carolina)	A heart urchin belonging to the family Prenasteridae. Genus includes new species C. varnami.	
Comptoniaster michaelisi	Nom. nov	Valid	Niebuhr & Seibertz	Late Cretaceous (middle Turonian to middle Coniacian)		Czech Republic; Germany; Poland	A starfish belonging to the family Goniasteridae; a replacement name for Asterias schulzii Cotta sensu Roemer (1840, 1841).	
Costatocrinus	Gen. et 2 sp. nov	Valid	Gale	Late Cretaceous (Campanian)	Taylor Formation	United Kingdom; United States (Texas)	A crinoid belonging to the group Articulata and the family Saccocomidae. The type species is C. brydonei; genus also includes C. mortimorei.	
Cultellacrinus	Gen. et 2 sp. nov	Valid	Gale	Late Cretaceous		Sweden; United Kingdom	A crinoid belonging to the group Articulata and the family Roveacrinidae. The type species is C. gladius; genus also includes C. labyrinthus.	
Cunidentechinus	Gen. et comb. nov	Valid	Smith	Early Jurassic		United Kingdom	A stem-carinacean sea urchin; a new genus for "Echinus" minutus Buckman in Murchison (1845).	
Darwinaster	Gen. et sp. nov	Valid	Hunter, Rushton & Stone	Early Devonian	Fox Bay Formation	Falkland Islands	A brittle star related to members of the genus Protaster. Genus includes new species D. coleenbiggsae.	
Echinolampas andalusiensis	Sp. nov	Valid	Osborn, Mooi & Ciampaglio	Eocene	Moodys Branch Formation	United States (Alabama)	A sea urchin belonging to the family Echinolampadidae.	
Gitolampas twitchelli	Sp. nov	Valid	Osborn, Mooi & Ciampaglio	Eocene	Santee Limestone	United States (South Carolina)	A sea urchin belonging to the group Cassiduloida.	
Glyptocrinus nodosus	Sp. nov	Valid	Kallmeyer & Ausich	Ordovician (Katian)	Kope Formation	United States (Kentucky; Ohio)	A camerate crinoid, a species of Glyptocrinus.	
Goniopygus macrotuberculatus	Sp. nov	Valid	El Qot, Abdelhamid, & Abdelghany	Late Cretaceous (Cenomanian)	Raha Formation	Egypt	A sea urchin belonging to the group Arbacioida and the family Acropeltidae.	
Goniopygus subaequalis	Sp. nov	Valid	El Qot, Abdelhamid, & Abdelghany	Late Cretaceous (Cenomanian)	Raha Formation	Egypt	A sea urchin belonging to the group Arbacioida and the family Acropeltidae.	
Haimea brooksi	Sp. nov	Valid	Osborn, Mooi & Ciampaglio	Eocene	Ocala Limestone	United States (Florida)	A sea urchin belonging to the group Oligopygoida.	
Hessicrinus	Gen. et 2 sp. nov	Valid	Gale	Late Cretaceous (Campanian)		United Kingdom	A crinoid belonging to the group Articulata and the family Roveacrinidae. The type species is H. filigree; genus also includes H. scalaensis.	
Hiiumaacrinus	Gen. et sp. nov	Valid	Ausich & Wilson	Silurian (Rhuddanian)	Hilliste Formation	Estonia	A crinoid. Genus includes new species H. vinni.	
Jakeocrinus	Gen. et sp. nov	Valid	Gale	Late Cretaceous (early Campanian)	Taylor Formation	United States (Texas)	A crinoid belonging to the group Articulata and the family Roveacrinidae. The type species is J. ellisensis.	
Lakotacrinus	Gen. et sp. nov	Valid	Hunter et al.	Late Cretaceous (Campanian)	Pierre Shale	United States (South Dakota)	A stalked crinoid. The type species is L. brezinai.	
Lehmannaster	Gen. et sp. nov	Valid	Blake, Guensburg & Lefebvre	Ordovician (late Darriwilian)	Traveusot Formation	France	A stenuroid asterozoan. Genus includes new species L. spinosus.	
Leptosalenia botanzi	Sp. nov	Valid	Forner & Moreno	Early Cretaceous (Albian)		Spain	A sea urchin belonging to the family Saleniidae.	
Lopidiaster	Gen. et sp. nov	Valid	Blake, Guensburg & Lefebvre	Ordovician (Floian)	Garden City Formation	United States (Utah)	A stenuroid asterozoan. Genus includes new species L. jamisoni.	
Loriolidiadema	Gen. et comb. nov	Valid	Abdelhamid, El Qot & Abdelghany	Cretaceous (Aptian-Cenomanian)		Egypt; Portugal; Border region between Syria and Lebanon	A heterodiadematid sea urchin. The type species is "Pseudodiadema" libanoticum de Loriol (1887); genus also includes Loriolidiadema sculptile (de Loriol, 1887).	
Lucernacrinus	Gen. et sp. nov	Valid	Gale	Late Cretaceous		United Kingdom	A crinoid belonging to the group Articulata and the family Roveacrinidae. The type species is L. woodi.	
Maennilocystis	Gen. et sp. nov	Valid	Paul & Rozhnov	Late Ordovician		Estonia	A cystoid belonging to the family Callocystitidae. The type species is M. heckeri.	
Manfredaster praebulbiferus	Sp. nov	Valid	Niebuhr & Seibertz	Late Cretaceous (Cenomanian to Coniacian)	Dölzschen Formation; Schrammstein Formation; Strehlen Formation	Germany	A starfish belonging to the group Valvatida and the family Stauranderasteridae.	
Mariania comaschicariae	Sp. nov	Valid	Stara, Borghi & Kroh	Miocene (Aquitanian to early Burdigalian)	Nurallao Formation	Italy	A heart urchin belonging to the superfamily Spatangoidea, a species of Mariania.	
Mariania stefaninii	Sp. nov	Valid	Stara, Borghi & Kroh	Miocene (late Burdigalian to early Langhian)	Pantano Formation	Italy	A heart urchin belonging to the superfamily Spatangoidea, a species of Mariania.	
Meturaster	Gen. et sp. nov	Valid	Blake, Guensburg & Lefebvre	Ordovician (middle Darriwilian)	Lehman Formation	United States (Nevada)	A starfish. Genus includes new species M. belli.	
Monophoraster telfordi	Sp. nov	Valid	Mooi, Martínez & del Río	Early Miocene	Chenque Formation	Argentina	A sand dollar.	
Nucleolites usoi	Sp. nov	Valid	Forner i Valls	Early Cretaceous (Barremian)	Artoles Formation	Spain	A sea urchin.	
Osteocrinus sinensis	Sp. nov	Valid	Hess, Etter & Hagdorn	Late Triassic (early Carnian)	Xiaowa Formation	China	A crinoid belonging to the group Roveacrinida, a species of Osteocrinus.	
Pentamerocrinus kosovi	Sp. nov	Valid	Rozhnov	Ordovician		Russia (Leningrad Oblast)	A crinoid belonging to the group Inadunata, a species of Pentamerocrinus.	
Petraster crozonensis	Sp. nov	Valid	Blake, Guensburg & Lefebvre	Ordovician (early Katian)	Kermeur Formation	France	A starfish.	
Phyllocrinus bersekensis	Sp. nov	Valid	Konieczyński, Pisera & Fózy	Early Cretaceous		Hungary	A cyrtocrinid crinoid, a species of Phyllocrinus.	
Placentinechinus	Gen. et sp. nov	Valid	Borghi & Garilli	Pleistocene (Gelasian–Calabrian)		Italy	A sea urchin belonging to the family Temnopleuridae. The type species is P. davolii.	
Plagiochasma saurai	Sp. nov	Valid	Forner i Valls	Early Cretaceous (Barremian)	Artoles Formation	Spain	A sea urchin.	
Platelicrinus longispinus	Sp. nov	Valid	Gale	Late Cretaceous		United Kingdom	A crinoid belonging to the group Articulata and the family Roveacrinidae.	
Protaeropsis	Nom. nov	Valid	Doweld	Paleocene (Thanetian)		Spain	A heart urchin; a replacement name for Sphenaster Jeffery in Smith et al. (1999).	
Protaxocrinus estoniensis	Sp. nov	Valid	Ausich & Wilson	Silurian (Rhuddanian)	Hilliste Formation	Estonia	A crinoid.	
Pseudomilnia	Gen. et comb. nov	Valid	Smith	Middle Jurassic		France; United Kingdom	A salenioidan sea urchin; a new genus for "Acrosalenia" miliaria Paris (1908).	
Sagittacrinus	Gen. et sp. nov	Valid	Gale	Late Cretaceous (early Campanian)	Taylor Formation	United Kingdom; United States (Texas)	A crinoid belonging to the group Articulata and the family Saccocomidae. The type species is S. torpedo.	
Salenia buddyi	Sp. nov	Valid	Osborn, Mooi & Ciampaglio	Eocene	Santee Limestone	United States (South Carolina)	A sea urchin belonging to the group Salenioida.	
Schuchertia sprinklei	Sp. nov	Valid	Blake, Guensburg & Lefebvre	Ordovician (Dapingian)	Kanosh Shale	United States (Utah)	A starfish.	
Stellacrinus	Gen. et 2 sp. nov	Valid	Gale	Late Cretaceous (Santonian and Campanian)	Gulpen Formation; Taylor Formation; Vaals Formation	Netherlands; Sweden; United Kingdom; United States (Texas)	A crinoid belonging to the group Articulata and the family Roveacrinidae. The type species is S. hugesae; genus also includes S. pannosus.	
Stomechinus phillipsii	Sp. nov	Valid	Smith	Jurassic		United Kingdom	A sea urchin.	
Thinocrinus akanthos	Sp. nov	Valid	Rhenberg, Ausich & Meyer	Carboniferous (Mississippian)	Fort Payne Formation	United States (Kentucky)	A camerate crinoid belonging to the group Monobathrida and the family Actinocrinitidae.	
Trochotiara aalensis	Sp. nov	Valid	Smith	Middle Jurassic		United Kingdom	A sea urchin.	
Wrightechinus	Gen. et comb. nov	Valid	Smith	Middle Jurassic		France; United Kingdom	A sea urchin, possibly a stem-salenioidan; a new genus for "Acrosalenia" lycetti Wright (1851).	

== Conodonts ==
Name	Novelty	Status	Authors	Age	Unit	Location	Notes	Images
Amydrotaxis corniculans truncus	Subsp. nov	Valid	Mathieson et al.	Early Devonian	Mountain Dam Limestone	Australia	A member of Ozarkodinida belonging to the family Spathognathodontidae.	
Cuspigrandiosa	Gen. nov	Valid	Murphy, Carls & Valenzuela-Ríos			Austria; United States (Nevada)		
Cypricriodus	Gen. et comb. nov	Valid	Murphy, Carls & Valenzuela-Ríos	Silurian and Early Devonian		Australia; United States (Nevada)	Genus includes "Icriodus woschmidti" hesperius Klapper & Murphy (1975), raised to the rank of the species C. hesperius.	
Eurekadonta	Gen. et comb. nov	Valid	Murphy, Carls & Valenzuela-Ríos	Silurian and Early Devonian		United States (Nevada)	Genus includes "Ozarkodina" eurekaensis Klapper & Murphy (1975).	
Eognathodus kuangi	Sp. nov	Valid	Earp	Early Devonian		China		
Eognathodus sulcatus lanei	Subsp. nov	Valid	Mathieson et al.	Early Devonian	Mountain Dam Limestone	Australia	A member of Ozarkodinida belonging to the family Spathognathodontidae.	
Eognathodus sulcatus sicatus	Subsp. nov	Valid	Mathieson et al.	Early Devonian	Booth Limestone	Australia	A member of Ozarkodinida belonging to the family Spathognathodontidae.	
Gladigondolella okayi	Sp. nov	Valid	Kiliç	Triassic	Kayabaşı Limestone	Turkey		
Gondolella wardlawi	Sp. nov	Valid	Nestell & Pope in Nestell, Wardlaw & Pope	Carboniferous (Pennsylvanian)	Excello Shale	United States (Iowa)		
Heliagnathus	Gen. et sp. nov	Valid	Mathieson et al.	Early Devonian	Mountain Dam Limestone	Australia	A member of Ozarkodinida of uncertain phylogenetic placement. The type species is H. parvilabiatus.	
Icriodus ampliatus	Sp. nov	Valid	Mathieson et al.	Early Devonian	Mountain Dam Limestone	Australia	A member of Prioniodontida belonging to the family Icriodontidae.	
Icriodus michiganus	Sp. nov	Valid	Narkiewicz & Bultynck	Devonian (Eifelian)	Michigan Basin	United States		
Icriodus praealternatus ferus	Subsp. nov	Valid	Wang et al.	Late Devonian (Frasnian/Famennian boundary)	Hongguleleng Formation	China	A subspecies of Icriodus praealternatus.	
Icriodus plurinodosus	Sp. nov	Valid	Wang et al.	Late Devonian (early Famennian)	Hongguleleng Formation	China	A species of Icriodus.	
Icriodus stenoancylus junggarensis	Subsp. nov	Valid	Wang et al.	Late Devonian (early Famennian)	Hongguleleng Formation	China	A subspecies of Icriodus stenoancylus.	
Idiognathodus lateralis	Sp. nov	Valid	Hogancamp, Barrick & Strauss	Carboniferous (early Gzhelian)		China; Russia; Ukraine; United States	Originally described as a species of Idiognathodus, but subsequently transferred to the genus Heckelina.	
Idiognathodus tuberis	Sp. nov	Valid	Nestell, Wardlaw & Pope	Carboniferous (Pennsylvanian)	Excello Shale	United States (Iowa)	A member of Ozarkodinida belonging to the family Idiognathodontidae.	
Neogondolella cuneiforme	Sp. nov	Valid	Golding & Orchard	Middle Triassic (Anisian)		Canada (British Columbia)		
Neogondolella curva	Sp. nov	Valid	Golding & Orchard	Middle Triassic (Anisian)		Canada (British Columbia); United States (Nevada)		
Neogondolella dilacerata	Sp. nov	Valid	Golding & Orchard	Middle Triassic (Anisian)		Canada (British Columbia)	Originally described as a species of Neogondolella, but subsequently transferred to the genus Magnigondolella.	
Neogondolella hastata	Sp. nov	Valid	Golding & Orchard	Middle Triassic (Anisian)		Canada (British Columbia); United States (Nevada)		
Neogondolella indicta	Sp. nov	Valid	Golding & Orchard	Middle Triassic (Anisian)		Canada (British Columbia); United States (Nevada)		
Neogondolella panlaurentia	Sp. nov	Valid	Golding & Orchard	Middle Triassic (Anisian)		Canada (British Columbia); United States (Nevada)		
Neogondolella tenera	Sp. nov	Valid	Golding & Orchard	Middle Triassic (Anisian)		Canada (British Columbia); United States (Nevada)		
Neogondolella vellicata	Sp. nov	Valid	Golding & Orchard	Middle Triassic (Anisian)		Canada (British Columbia); United States (Nevada)		
Neopolygnathus huijunae	Sp. nov	Valid	Wang et al.	Late Devonian (early Famennian)	Hongguleleng Formation	China	A species of Neopolygnathus.	
Neospathodus planus	Sp. nov	Valid	Chen et al.	Early Triassic		Slovenia	Originally described as a species of Neospathodus; Bai et al. (2021) argued that it should be reassigned to the genus Triassospathodus.	
Oulodus astriatus	Sp. nov	Valid	Mathieson et al.	Early Devonian	Booth Limestone	Australia	A member of Prioniodinida belonging to the family Prioniodinidae.	
Ozarkodina multistriola	Sp. nov	Valid	Mathieson et al.	Early Devonian	Mountain Dam Limestone	Australia	A member of Ozarkodinida belonging to the family Spathognathodontidae.	
Ozarkodina scoliciformis	Sp. nov	Valid	Mathieson et al.	Early Devonian	Mountain Dam Limestone	Australia	A member of Ozarkodinida belonging to the family Spathognathodontidae.	
Ozarkodina selfi cordata	Subsp. nov	Valid	Mathieson et al.	Early Devonian	Mountain Dam Limestone	Australia	A member of Ozarkodinida belonging to the family Spathognathodontidae.	
Ozarkodina selfi lanceola	Subsp. nov	Valid	Mathieson et al.	Early Devonian	Mountain Dam Limestone	Australia	A member of Ozarkodinida belonging to the family Spathognathodontidae.	
Ozarkodina selfi lenticula	Subsp. nov	Valid	Mathieson et al.	Early Devonian	Mountain Dam Limestone	Australia	A member of Ozarkodinida belonging to the family Spathognathodontidae.	
Panderodus rhytiodus	Sp. nov	Valid	Mathieson et al.	Early Devonian	Mountain Dam Limestone	Australia	A member of the family Panderodontidae.	
Pelekysgnathus inequalis	Sp. nov	Valid	Mathieson et al.	Early Devonian	Booth Limestone	Australia	A member of Prioniodontida belonging to the family Icriodontidae.	
Pelekysgnathus jeppssoni	Sp. nov	Valid	Nazarova	Devonian (Eifelian)		Russia (Bryansk Oblast)		
Platyvillosus corniger	Sp. nov	Valid	Chen et al.	Early Triassic		Slovenia		
Polygnathus abaimovae	Sp. nov	Valid	Baranov & Blodgett	Devonian (Emsian)		Russia		
Polygnathus beckeri	Nom. nov	Valid	Baranov & Blodgett	Devonian (Emsian)		Russia	A replacement name for Polygnathus inflexus Baranov (1992).	
Polygnathus datnensis	Sp. nov	Valid	Baranov & Blodgett	Devonian (Emsian)		Russia		
Polygnathus dogdensis	Sp. nov	Valid	Baranov & Blodgett	Devonian (Emsian)		Russia		
Polygnathus novozemelicus	Sp. nov	Valid	Baranov & Blodgett	Devonian (Emsian)		Russia		
"Polygnathus" pseudocommunis	Sp. nov	Valid	Wang et al.	Late Devonian (early Famennian)	Hongguleleng Formation	China	Possibly a species of Polygnathus.	
Polygnathus slastenovi	Sp. nov	Valid	Baranov & Blodgett	Devonian (Emsian)		Russia		
Polygnathus tarabukini	Sp. nov	Valid	Baranov & Blodgett	Devonian (Emsian)		Russia		
Praeicriodus	Gen. et comb. nov	Valid	Murphy	Silurian		Canada	Genus includes "Pedavis" thorsteinssoni Uyeno (1980).	
Siphonodella (Siphonodella) jii	Nom. nov	Disputed	Becker, Kaiser & Aretz	Carboniferous (Tournaisian)	Chappel Limestone	United States	A replacement name for Siphonodella (Siphonodella) hassi Ji (1985). Plotitsyn and Zhuravlev (2016) considered S. jii to be a junior synonym of Siphonodella quadruplicata (Branson et Mehl), because they considered the specimen selected as the holotype of S. jii to be more likely to represent an ontogenetic stage of S. quadruplicata.	
Staeschegnathus	Gen. et sp. nov	Valid	Koike	Triassic	Taho Formation	Japan	An ellisonid conodont. The type species is S. perrii.	

== Amphibians ==
=== Research ===
- A study on the histology and growth histories of the humeri of the specimens of Acanthostega recovered from the mass-death deposit of Stensiö Bjerg (Greenland) is published by Sanchez et al. (2016), who argue that even the largest individuals from this deposit are juveniles.
- Fossils of a tetrapod resembling Ichthyostega and a probable whatcheeriid-grade tetrapod are described from two Devonian (Famennian) localities from Belgium by Olive et al. (2016).
- A study on the functional significance of the interpterygoid vacuities (holes in the palate) in temnospondyls is published by Lautenschlager, Witzmann & Werneburg (2016).
- A study on the stress distribution in the skulls of Edingerella madagascariensis and Stanocephalosaurus birdi during the bite, with implications for establishing the ecological niches occupied by these temnospondyls, is published by Fortuny et al. (2016).
- A study on the anatomy, ecological niche and life history of members the population of Eocyclotosaurus appetolatus known from the Tecolotito bonebed (Moenkopi Formation; New Mexico, United States) is published by Rinehart & Lucas (2016).
- A study on the morphology of the skull and braincase of Brachydectes newberryi is published by Pardo & Anderson (2016).
- A study on the locomotor capabilities of Triadobatrachus massinoti is published by Lires, Soto & Gómez (2016).
- A revised description of the holotype of Triadobatrachus massinoti based on X-ray micro-tomography data is published by Ascarrunz et al. (2016).
- The first unambiguous frog fossil from the Jurassic of Asia (an atlantal centrum of a possible member of the genus Eodiscoglossus) is described from the Middle Jurassic (Bathonian) Itat Formation (Russia) by Skutschas, Martin & Krasnolutskii (2016).

=== New taxa ===
==== Temnospondyls ====
Name	Novelty	Status	Authors	Age	Unit	Location	Notes	Images
Cyclotosaurus buechneri	Sp. nov	Valid	Witzmann, Sachs & Nyhuis	Late Triassic (middle Carnian)	Stuttgart Formation	Germany	A mastodonsauroid temnospondyl, a species of Cyclotosaurus.	
Konzhukovia sangabrielensis	Sp. nov	Valid	Pacheco et al.	Permian (early Guadalupian)	Rio do Rasto Formation	Brazil		
Samarabatrachus	Gen. et sp. nov	Valid	Novikov	Early Triassic	Sukhorechka Formation	Russia (Samara Oblast)	A capitosaurid temnospondyl. The type species is S. bjerringi.	
Selenocara rossica	Sp. nov	Valid	Novikov	Early Triassic	Sukhorechka Formation	Russia (Orenburg Oblast; Samara Oblast)	A capitosaurid temnospondyl.	
Stanocephalosaurus amenasensis	Sp. nov	Valid	Dahoumane et al.	Early-Middle Triassic	Zarzaïtine Series, Illizi Basin	Algeria	A mastodonsauroid temnospondyl, a species of Stanocephalosaurus.	
Syrtosuchus	Gen. et comb. et sp. nov	Valid	Novikov	Early Triassic	Sukhorechka Formation	Russia (Orenburg Oblast; Samara Oblast)	A benthosuchid temnospondyl. The type species is "Wetlugasaurus" samarensis Sennikov (1981); genus also includes new species S. morkovini.	
Tomeia	Gen. et sp. nov	Valid	Eltink, Da-Rosa & Dias-da-Silva	Early Triassic	Sanga do Cabral Supersequence	Brazil	A mastodonsauroid temnospondyl. The type species is T. witecki.	
Yuanansuchus maopingchangensis	Sp. nov	Valid	Liu	Middle Triassic (Anisian)	Badong Formation	China	A mastodonsauroid temnospondyl, a species of Yuanansuchus.	

==== Lissamphibians ====
Name	Novelty	Status	Authors	Age	Unit	Location	Notes	Images
Hyogobatrachus	Gen. et sp. nov	Valid	Ikeda, Ota & Matsui	Early Cretaceous	Ohyamashimo Formation	Japan	A frog. The type species is Hyogobatrachus wadai.	
Kiyatriton krasnolutskii	Sp. nov	Valid	Skutschas	Middle Jurassic (Bathonian)	Itat Formation	Russia (Krasnoyarsk Krai)	A salamander, a species of Kiyatriton.	
Kuruleufenia	Gen. et sp. nov	Valid	Gómez	Late Cretaceous (late Campanian–early Maastrichtian)	Allen Formation	Argentina	A member of Pipidae. The type species is Kuruleufenia xenopoides.	
Litoria lundeliusi	Sp. nov	Valid	Tyler & Prideaux	Pleistocene		Australia	A species of Litoria.	
Nuominerpeton	Gen. et sp. nov	Valid	Jia & Gao	Early Cretaceous (Barremian–Aptian)	Guanghua Formation	China	A cryptobranchoid salamander of uncertain phylogenetic placement. The type species is N. aquilonaris.	
Palaeobatrachus eurydices	Sp. nov	Valid	Villa et al.	Early Pleistocene (Gelasian)		Netherlands		
Phosphotriton	Gen. et sp. nov	Valid	Tissier, Rage, Boistel, Fernandez, Pollet, Garcia and Laurin	Eocene		France	A salamander. The type species is Phosphotriton sigei.	
Prospea	Gen. et sp. nov	Valid	Chen et al.	Paleocene	Naranbulak Formation	Mongolia	A member of Scaphiopodidae. The type species is Prospea holoserisca.	
Qinglongtriton	Gen. et sp. nov	Valid	Jia & Gao	Late Jurassic (Oxfordian)	Tiaojishan Formation	China	A basal member of Salamandroidea. The type species is Qinglongtriton gangouensis.	
Tambabatrachus	Gen. et sp. nov	Valid	Ikeda, Ota & Matsui	Early Cretaceous	Ohyamashimo Formation	Japan	A frog. The type species is Tambabatrachus kawazu.	

==== Others ====
Name	Novelty	Status	Authors	Age	Unit	Location	Notes	Images
Aytonerpeton	Gen. et sp. nov	Valid	Otoo, Clack & Smithson in Clack et al.	Carboniferous (Tournaisian)	Ballagan Formation	United Kingdom	An early tetrapod of uncertain phylogenetic placement. The type species is A. microps.	
Diploradus	Gen. et sp. nov	Valid	Clack & Smithson in Clack et al.	Carboniferous (Tournaisian)	Ballagan Formation	United Kingdom	An early tetrapod of uncertain phylogenetic placement. The type species is D. austiumensis.	
Koilops	Gen. et sp. nov	Valid	Clack & Smithson in Clack et al.	Carboniferous (Tournaisian)	Ballagan Formation	United Kingdom	An early tetrapod of uncertain phylogenetic placement. The type species is K. herma.	
Ossirarus	Gen. et sp. nov	Valid	Clack & Smithson in Clack et al.	Carboniferous (Tournaisian)	Ballagan Formation	United Kingdom	An early tetrapod of uncertain phylogenetic placement. The type species is O. kierani.	
Perittodus	Gen. et sp. nov	Valid	Clack & Smithson in Clack et al.	Carboniferous (Tournaisian)	Ballagan Formation	United Kingdom	An early tetrapod of uncertain phylogenetic placement. The type species is P. apsconditus.	

== Synapsids ==
=== Non-mammalian synapsids ===
==== Research ====
- A study on the respiratory system and paleobiology of caseids is published by Lambertz et al. (2016), who argue that at least some caseids might have been predominantly aquatic and that a homologue of the mammalian diaphragm might have been present in caseids.
- A redescription of the sphenacodontian taxa Palaeohatteria and Pantelosaurus is published by Spindler (2016), who assigns both these taxa to the clade Palaeohatteriidae, but considers it likely that they represent distinct valid taxa.
- A study on the paleoneurology of non-mammaliaform therapsids is published by Benoit, Manger & Rubidge (2016), who argue that whiskers, body hair coverage and mammary glands might have been present in some non-mammaliaform therapsids.
- A study on the occurrence and size of the parietal foramen (an opening in which the pineal eye is located) in non-mammaliaform therapsids (especially non-mammaliaform eutheriodonts) known from the Karoo Supergroup of South Africa is published by Benoit et al. (2016).
- A study of life histories and growth patterns as indicated by bone tissue microstructure and body size in members of three synapsid groups that survived Permian–Triassic extinction event (dicynodonts, therocephalians and cynodonts) and one that didn't (gorgonopsians) is published by Botha-Brink et al. (2016).
- A revision of the systematics of the gorgonopsian subfamily Rubidgeinae is published by Kammerer (2016).
- A study on the anatomy and potential function of the cranial outgrowths of Choerosaurus dejageri is published by Benoit et al. (2016).
- Benoit & Jasinoski (2016) present a digital reconstruction of the lost holotype specimen of the cynodont species Scalopocynodon gracilis (a junior synonym of Procynosuchus delaharpeae).
- A study on the microstructure of the postcanine teeth of the trirachodontid cynodont Cricodon metabolus is published by Hendrickx, Abdala & Choiniere (2016).
- A description of a new specimen of Massetognathus ochagaviae collected at the Middle Triassic Dinodontosaurus Assemblage Zone (Brazil) is published by Pavanatto et al. (2016).
- A study comparing the growth patterns of the tritylodontid cynodont Oligokyphus and the basal mammaliaform Morganucodon is published by O'Meara & Asher (2016).
- Hair-like structures found in a coprolite recovered from the Late Permian Vyazniki site (Russia), which might represent the oldest evidence of hair in the stem group of mammals, are described by Bajdek et al. (2016).

==== New taxa ====
Name	Novelty	Status	Authors	Age	Unit	Location	Notes	Images
Abdalodon	Gen. et sp. nov	Valid	Kammerer	Late Permian	Beaufort Group (Tropidostoma Assemblage Zone)	South Africa	An early cynodont related to Charassognathus gracilis. The type species is Abdalodon diastematicus.	
Bonacynodon	Gen. et sp. nov	Valid	Martinelli, Soares & Schwanke	Late Triassic (early Carnian)	Santa Maria Supersequence	Brazil	A member of Probainognathidae. The type species is B. schultzi.	
Montirictus	Gen. et sp. nov	Valid	Matsuoka, Kusuhashi & Korfe	Early Cretaceous (probably Barremian or Aptian)	Kuwajima Formation	Japan	A member of Tritylodontidae. The type species is Montirictus kuwajimaensis. Averianov et al. (2017) considered the genus Montirictus to be a junior synonym of the genus Stereognathus.	
Mupashi	Gen. et sp. nov	Valid	Huttenlocker & Sidor	Late Permian	Madumabisa Mudstone Formation	Zambia	A therocephalian related to Karenites. The type species is Mupashi migrator.	
Rastodon	Gen. et sp. nov	Valid	Boos et al.	Permian (Guadalupian/Lopingian)	Rio do Rasto Formation	Brazil	A dicynodont belonging to the group Bidentalia. The type species is R. procurvidens.	
Santacruzgnathus	Gen. et sp. nov	Valid	Martinelli, Soares & Schwanke	Late Triassic (early Carnian)	Santa Maria Supersequence	Brazil	A member of Probainognathia, probably closely related to prozostrodontians. The type species is S. abdalai.	
Sauroscaptor	Gen. et sp. nov	Valid	Kammerer, Bandyopadhyay & Ray	Late Permian	Kundaram Formation	India	A cistecephalid dicynodont. The type species is S. tharavati.	
Vaughnictis	Gen. et comb. nov	Valid	Brocklehurst et al.	Permian (Asselian-Sakmarian)	Cutler Group	United States (Colorado)	A member of Eothyrididae; a new genus for "Mycterosaurus" smithae Lewis & Vaughn (1965).	
Wantulignathus	Gen. et sp. nov	Valid	Whitney & Sidor	Permian (Guadalupian)	Madumabisa Mudstone Formation	Zambia	A biarmosuchian. The type species is Wantulignathus gwembensis.	

== Other animals ==
=== Research ===
- Traces of a wriggling, mucus-secreting animal are described from the Ediacaran Doushantuo Formation (China) by Wang et al. (2016), who name a new ichnotaxon Linbotulitaenia globulus.
- New fossils of Ernietta plateauensis are described from the Ediacaran site in southern Namibia by Elliott et al. (2016).
- Embryo-like fossils are described from the Ediacaran Doushantuo Formation (China) by Yin et al. (2016), who argue that at least some of these fossils represent crown-animal embryos.
- New fossil material of Oesia disjuncta is described by Nanglu et al. (2016), who interpret this species as a primitive acorn worm that inhabited the tubes previously identified as the alga Margaretia.
- A redescription of Helenodora inopinata and a study of its phylogenetic relationships is published by Murdock, Gabbott & Purnell (2016).
- Description of the anatomy of the fossil velvet worm Cretoperipatus burmiticus and a study on its phylogenetic relationships is published by de Sena Oliveira et al. (2016).
- A study on the anatomy of the mouth apparatus of the lobopodian Pambdelurion whittingtoni is published by Vinther et al. (2016), who show that its mouth apparatus was identical to the fossilized feeding apparatus described under the name Omnidens.

=== New taxa ===
Name	Novelty	Status	Authors	Age	Unit	Location	Notes	Images
Acanthograptus lateralis	Sp. nov	Valid	Chen in Chen et al.	Ordovician		China	A graptolite.	
Acoelia norica	Sp. nov	Valid	Senowbari-Daryan & Link	Late Triassic (Norian)		Turkey	A demosponge belonging to the group Agelasida.	
Acrograptus tenuiculus	Sp. nov	Valid	Chen in Chen et al.	Ordovician		China	A graptolite.	
Amblysiphonella aiyongcuoensis	Sp. nov	Valid	Deng	Permian		China	A sponge.	
Annulitubus	Gen. et sp. nov	Valid	Vinn et al.	Devonian (late Emsian)	Ponta Grossa Formation	Brazil	An annelid, possibly a polychaete. The type species is Annulitubus mutveii.	
Antennipatus	Gen. et sp. nov	Valid	Garwood, Edgecombe & Giribet in Garwood et al.	Carboniferous (Stephanian)	Montceau-les-Mines Lagerstätte	France	A velvet worm. The type species is A. montceauensis.	
Apoglossograptus uniformis	Sp. nov	Valid	Chen in Chen et al.	Ordovician		China	A graptolite.	
Archiasterella dhiraji	Sp. nov	Valid	Gilbert, Hughes & Myrow	Cambrian	Parahio Formation	India		
Archiclimacograptus columnus	Sp. nov	Valid	Chen in Chen et al.	Ordovician		China	A graptolite.	
Baltichaeta	Gen. et sp. nov	Valid	Slater et al.	Cambrian (Stage 4)	File Haidar Formation	Sweden	A member of the total group of Annelida. The type species is B. jormunganda.	
Baltiscalida	Gen. et sp. nov	Valid	Slater et al.	Cambrian (Stage 4)	File Haidar Formation	Sweden	A member of the total group of Priapulida. The type species is B. njorda.	
Bistella	Gen. et sp. nov	Valid	Fedorov in Fedorov, Parkhaev & Demidenko	Cambrian		Russia	A heteractinid sponge belonging to the group Heteractinellida and the family Heterostellidae. The type species is B. inexplicabila.	
Bohemograptus praecox	Sp. nov	Valid	Štorch et al.	Silurian		Czech Republic	A graptolite.	
Bolidium bertii	Sp. nov	Valid	Frisone, Pisera & Preto	Eocene (early Lutetian)		Italy	A sponge, a species of Bolidium.	
Burejospermum punctatum	Sp. nov	Valid	McLoughlin et al.	Early Eocene	La Meseta Formation	Antarctica (Seymour Island)	A member of Clitellata of uncertain phylogenetic placement, described on the basis of fossilized cocoons; a species of Burejospermum.	
Burejospermum seymourense	Sp. nov	Valid	McLoughlin et al.	Early Eocene	La Meseta Formation	Antarctica (Seymour Island)	A member of Clitellata of uncertain phylogenetic placement, described on the basis of fossilized cocoons; a species of Burejospermum.	
Caelispongia	Gen. et sp. nov	Valid	Senowbari-Daryan & Link	Late Triassic (Norian)	Kasımlar Basin	Turkey	A demosponge belonging to the group Agelasida and the family Stellispongiellidae. The type species is C. topukensis.	
Camerospongia tuberculata	Sp. nov	Valid	Frisone, Pisera & Preto	Eocene (early Lutetian)		Italy	A sponge, a species of Camerospongia.	
Camerospongia visentinae	Sp. nov	Valid	Frisone, Pisera & Preto	Eocene (early Lutetian)		Italy	A sponge, a species of Camerospongia.	
Capsulocyathus petri	Sp. nov	Valid	Sundukov & Zhuravlev	Cambrian		Russia	A member of Archaeocyatha belonging to the family Cryptoporocyathidae.	
Cavispongia scarpai	Sp. nov	Valid	Frisone, Pisera & Preto	Eocene (early Lutetian)		Italy	A sponge, a species of Cavispongia.	
Conotheca hensoni	Sp. nov	Valid	Peel et al.	Cambrian	Henson Gletscher Formation	Greenland	A member of Hyolitha belonging to the group Orthothecida.	
Constellatispongia	Gen. et sp. nov	Valid	Botting & Peel	Early Cambrian	Buen Formation	Greenland	A sponge. The type species is C. canismajorii.	
Corallistes multiosculata	Sp. nov	Valid	Frisone, Pisera & Preto	Eocene (early Lutetian)		Italy	A sponge, a species of Corallistes.	
Cornulites vilcae	Sp. nov	Valid	Vinn & Gutiérez-Marco	Late Ordovician (probably late Sandbian)	Probably Calapuja Formation	Peru	A member of Cornulitida (a group of animals of uncertain phylogenetic placement, possibly molluscs), a species of Cornulites.	
Cornulites zatoni	Sp. nov	Valid	Vinn & Gutiérez-Marco	Late Ordovician (Sandbian)	Calapuja Formation	Peru	A member of Cornulitida (a group of animals of uncertain phylogenetic placement, possibly molluscs), a species of Cornulites.	
Coronispongia	Gen. et sp. nov	Valid	Frisone, Pisera & Preto	Eocene (early Lutetian)		Italy	A sponge. The type species is Coronispongia confossa.	
Corynites nanus	Sp. nov	Valid	Chen in Chen et al.	Ordovician		China	A graptolite.	
Crassicoactum	Gen. et sp. nov	Valid	Botting & Peel	Early Cambrian	Buen Formation	Greenland	A sponge. The type species is C. cucumis.	
Daharella triassica	Sp. nov	Valid	Senowbari-Daryan & Link	Late Triassic (Norian)	Kasımlar Basin	Turkey	A demosponge belonging to the group Agelasida and the family Auriculospongiidae.	
Dicranograptus ramosus angustus	Subsp. nov	Valid	Chen in Chen et al.	Ordovician		China	A graptolite.	
Eoglyptograptus asymmetros	Sp. nov	Valid	Goldman & Zhang in Chen et al.	Ordovician		China	A graptolite.	
Eolipastrotethya	Gen. et sp. nov	Valid	Łukowiak & Pisera	Late Eocene	Pallinup Formation	Australia	A heteroscleromorph demosponge belonging to the group Bubarida. The type species is E. picketti.	
Erismacoscinus lucanoi	Sp. nov	Valid	Menéndez et al.	Cambrian Stage 3	Pedroche Formation	Spain	A member of Archaeocyatha belonging to the family Asterocyathidae.	
Esakovella	Gen. et sp. nov	Valid	Fedorov in Fedorov, Parkhaev & Demidenko	Cambrian		Russia	A tommotiid belonging to the family Kelanellidae. The type species is E. grigorievae.	
Fallocyathus accomodatus	Sp. nov	Valid	Sundukov in Sundukov & Zhuravlev	Cambrian		Russia	A member of Archaeocyatha belonging to the family Fallocyathidae.	
Fallocyathus apheles	Sp. nov	Valid	Sundukov in Sundukov & Zhuravlev	Cambrian		Russia	A member of Archaeocyatha belonging to the family Fallocyathidae.	
Geodia hopetouni	Sp. nov	Valid	Łukowiak & Pisera	Late Eocene	Pallinup Formation	Australia	A heteroscleromorph demosponge belonging to the group Tetractinellida, a species of Geodia.	
Haddingograptus cuneatus	Sp. nov	Valid	Chen in Chen et al.	Ordovician		China	A graptolite.	
Haddingograptus flexibilis	Sp. nov	Valid	Chen in Chen et al.	Ordovician		China	A graptolite.	
Haddingograptus tarimensis	Sp. nov	Valid	Chen in Chen et al.	Ordovician		China	A graptolite.	
Hadimopanella incubo	Sp. nov	Valid	Streng, Ebbestad & Berg-Madsen	Cambrian		Sweden	A palaeoscolecid worm.	
Hadimopanella oelandiana	Sp. nov	Valid	Streng, Ebbestad & Berg-Madsen	Cambrian		Sweden	A palaeoscolecid worm.	
Hallograptus echinatus	Sp. nov	Valid	Chen in Chen et al.	Ordovician		China	A graptolite.	
Hamptonia limatula	Sp. nov	Valid	Botting & Peel	Early Cambrian	Buen Formation	Greenland	A sponge.	
Hexactinella clampensis	Sp. nov	Valid	Frisone, Pisera & Preto	Eocene (early Lutetian)		Italy	A sponge, a species of Hexactinella.	
?Hyalostelia spinula	Sp. nov	Valid	Fedorov in Fedorov, Parkhaev & Demidenko	Cambrian		Russia	A hexactinellid sponge belonging to the group Hexasterophora and the family Hyalostellidae.	
Jiangxigraptus? delicatus	Sp. nov	Valid	Chen in Chen et al.	Ordovician		China	A graptolite.	
Jiangxigraptus ultilis	Sp. nov	Valid	Chen in Chen et al.	Ordovician		China	A graptolite.	
Kuonamia	Nom. nov	Valid	Doweld	Cambrian Stage 4 to Guzhangian	Holm Dal Formation; Kuonamka Formation	Greenland; Russia (Sakha Republic)	A sponge; a replacement name for Disparella Fedorov in Fedorov & Pereladov (1987).	
Lenica perversa	Sp. nov	Valid	Botting & Peel	Early Cambrian	Buen Formation	Greenland	A sponge.	
Lyrarapax trilobus	Sp. nov	Valid	Cong et al.	Early Cambrian		China		
Milyasa	Gen. et 2 sp. nov	Valid	Senowbari-Daryan & Link	Late Triassic (Norian)	Dereköy Basin	Turkey	A demosponge belonging to the group Agelasida and the family Preperonidellidae. The type species is M. polysiphonata; genus also includes M. askomorpha.	
Mimograptus tenuis	Sp. nov	Valid	Chen in Chen et al.	Ordovician		China	A graptolite.	
Monocrepidium pauli	Sp. nov	Valid	Łukowiak & Pisera	Late Eocene	Pallinup Formation	Australia	A heteroscleromorph demosponge belonging to the group Bubarida.	
Monocrepidium unispiculatum	Sp. nov	Valid	Łukowiak & Pisera	Late Eocene	Pallinup Formation	Australia	A heteroscleromorph demosponge belonging to the group Bubarida.	
Nganki namak	Sp. nov	Valid	Kruse & Hughes	Cambrian	Khussak Formation	Pakistan	A member of Hyolitha (a group of animals of uncertain phylogenetic placement, possibly molluscs), a species of Nganki.	
Obscurospongia	Gen. et sp. nov	Valid	Senowbari-Daryan & Link	Late Triassic (Norian)	Kasımlar Basin	Turkey	An inozoid or chaetetid sponge. The type species is O. chaetetiformis	
Oepikograptus originalis	Sp. nov	Valid	Chen in Chen et al.	Ordovician		China	A graptolite.	
Orthograptus paracalcaratus	Sp. nov	Valid	Chen in Chen et al.	Ordovician		China	A graptolite.	
Ottoia guizhouensis	Sp. nov	Valid	Yang, Zhao & Zhang	Cambrian	Kaili Formation	China	A stem-group priapulid, a species of Ottoia.	
Pachastrella australis	Sp. nov	Valid	Łukowiak & Pisera	Late Eocene	Pallinup Formation	Australia	A heteroscleromorph demosponge belonging to the group Tetractinellida.	
Pachastrella intermedia	Sp. nov	Valid	Łukowiak & Pisera	Late Eocene	Pallinup Formation	Australia	A heteroscleromorph demosponge belonging to the group Tetractinellida.	
Palaeoscolex xinglongensis	Sp. nov	Valid	Liu et al.	Cambrian	Wulongqing Formation	China	A palaeoscolecid.	
Palaeotubus	Gen. et sp. nov	Valid	Sanfilippo et al.	Permian	Pietra di Salomone limestone	Italy	A polychaete, possibly a relative of serpulids. The type species is P. sosiensis.	
Pegmatothylakos	Gen. et sp. nov	Valid	McLoughlin et al.	Early Eocene	La Meseta Formation	Antarctica (Seymour Island)	A member of Clitellata of uncertain phylogenetic placement, described on the basis of fossilized cocoons. The type species is Pegmatothylakos manumii.	
Phycopsis arbusculum	Sp. nov	Valid	Łukowiak & Pisera	Late Eocene	Pallinup Formation	Australia	A heteroscleromorph demosponge belonging to the group Axinellida.	
Preperonidella asymmetrica	Sp. nov	Valid	Senowbari-Daryan & Link	Late Triassic (Norian)	Kasımlar Basin	Turkey	A demosponge belonging to the group Agelasida and the family Preperonidellidae.	
Proclimacograptus angustatus ultimus	Subsp. nov	Valid	Chen in Chen et al.	Ordovician		China	A graptolite.	
Pronormalograptus	Gen. et 2 sp. et comb. nov	Valid	Chen in Chen et al.	Ordovician		China; United Kingdom	A graptolite. The type species is P. acicularis; genus also includes new species P. regularis, as well as P. euglyphus (Lapworth, 1880) and P. siccatus (Elles and Wood, 1907).	
Pseudosardospongia	Gen. et 2 sp. nov	Valid	Fedorov in Fedorov, Parkhaev & Demidenko	Cambrian		Russia	A calcareous sponge belonging to the family Polyactinellidae. The type species is P. plana; genus also includes P. miriculata.	
Rajatubulus	Gen. et comb. nov	Valid	Yang et al.	Early Cambrian		Kazakhstan	A member of Cloudinidae; a new genus for "Pseudorthotheca" costata Mambetov in Missarzhevsky & Mambetov (1981).	
Rankenella zhangxianensis	Sp. nov	Valid	Lee, Woo & Lee	Cambrian	Zhangxia Formation	China	A sponge belonging to the family Anthaspidellidae.	
Ratcliffespongia freuchenensis	Sp. nov	Valid	Botting & Peel	Early Cambrian	Buen Formation	Greenland	A sponge.	
Rigonia	Gen. et sp. nov	Valid	Frisone, Pisera & Preto	Eocene (early Lutetian)		Italy	A sponge. The type species is Rigonia plicata.	
Rotundocyathus indistinctus	Sp. nov	Valid	Sundukov in Sundukov & Zhuravlev	Cambrian		Russia	A member of Archaeocyatha belonging to the family Ajacicyathidae.	
Rugatotheca daibuica	Sp. nov	Valid	Yang et al.	Early Cambrian	Daibu Member of the Xiaotan section	China	A small shelly fossil of uncertain phylogenetic placement.	
Saccoglossus testa	Sp. nov	Valid	Cameron	Carboniferous (Pennsylvanian)	Mazon Creek fossil beds	United States (Illinois)	An acorn worm belonging to the family Harrimaniidae, a species of Saccoglossus.	
Saetaspongia procera	Sp. nov	Valid	Botting & Peel	Early Cambrian	Buen Formation	Greenland	A sponge.	
Sanxiascolex	Gen. et sp. nov	Valid	Yang & Zhang	Cambrian	Shipai Formation	China	A palaeoscolecid. The type species is P. papillogyrus.	
Sardospongia gigantea	Sp. nov	Valid	Fedorov in Fedorov, Parkhaev & Demidenko	Cambrian		Russia	A calcareous sponge belonging to the family Polyactinellidae.	
Sardospongia triplexa	Sp. nov	Valid	Fedorov in Fedorov, Parkhaev & Demidenko	Cambrian		Russia	A calcareous sponge belonging to the family Polyactinellidae.	
Sarmentofascis zamparelliae	Sp. nov	Valid	Schlagintweit, Frijia & Parente	Late Cretaceous (early Campanian)		Italy	A sponge, a species of Sarmentofascis.	
Semigothograptus	Gen. et comb. nov	Valid	Kozłowska	Silurian		Czech Republic; Germany; Poland; United Kingdom	A graptolite; a new genus for "Gothograptus" meganassa Rickards & Palmer (2002).	
Sibirecyathus onkhoydokh	Sp. nov	Valid	Sundukov & Zhuravlev	Cambrian		Russia	A member of Archaeocyatha belonging to the family Ajacicyathidae.	
Spathioconchus	Gen. et sp. nov		Zatoń et al.	Early Triassic (Induan)		Greenland	A member of Microconchida (a group of animals of uncertain phylogenetic placement, possibly molluscs). The type species is S. weedoni.	
Spinuliconchus	Gen. et et comb. sp. nov	Valid	Zatoń & Olempska	Devonian		Poland; United States	A member of Microconchida. The type species is "Spirorbis" angulatus Hall (1861); genus also includes new species S. biernatae.	
Stauractinella eocenica	Sp. nov	Valid	Frisone, Pisera & Preto	Eocene (early Lutetian)		Italy	A sponge, a species of Stauractinella.	
Talacastospongia	Gen. et sp. nov	Valid	Carrera & Rustán	Devonian (Lochkovian)	Talacasto Formation	Argentina	A hexactinellid sponge. The type species is Talacastospongia minima.	
Tanchajella	Gen. et sp. nov	Valid	Fedorov in Fedorov, Parkhaev & Demidenko	Cambrian		Russia	A hexactinellid sponge belonging to the group Amphidiscophora and the family Hyalonematidae. The type species is T. aculeata.	
Taurispongia	Gen. et 8 sp. nov	Valid	Senowbari-Daryan & Link	Late Triassic (Norian)	Dereköy Basin	Turkey	A demosponge belonging to the group Agelasida and the family Stellispongiellidae. The type species is T. oligocanalis; genus also includes new species T. polycanalis, T. tenuis, T. lamellicanalis, T. fascifera, T. siderifera, T. lamellata and T. polyforma.	
Tenuipariespongia taurica	Sp. nov	Valid	Senowbari-Daryan & Link	Late Triassic (Norian)	Kasımlar Basin	Turkey	A demosponge belonging to the group Agelasida.	
Toulminia italica	Sp. nov	Valid	Frisone, Pisera & Preto	Eocene (early Lutetian)		Italy	A sponge, a species of Toulminia.	
Triptolemma solida	Sp. nov	Valid	Łukowiak & Pisera	Late Eocene	Pallinup Formation	Australia	A heteroscleromorph demosponge belonging to the group Tetractinellida.	
Tritonychus	Gen. et sp. nov.	Valid	Zhang et al.	Early Cambrian		China	A lobopodian. The type species is T. phanerosarkus.	
Tuberoconchus	Gen. et sp. nov	Valid	Zatoń in Zatoń & Olempska	Silurian (Ludlow)	Kuressaare Formation	Estonia; Sweden	A member of Microconchida (a group of animals of uncertain phylogenetic placement, possibly molluscs). The type species is "Palaeoconchus" wilsoni Zatoń, Vinn & Toom (2016).	
Tulenicornus? frykmani	Sp. nov	Valid	Peel et al.	Cambrian	Henson Gletscher Formation	Greenland	A member of Hyolitha belonging to the group Hyolithida.	
Tyanada	Gen. et comb. et sp. nov	Valid	Senowbari-Daryan & Link	Late Triassic (Norian-Rhaetian)		Australia; Austria; Iran; Turkey	A demosponge belonging to the group Agelasida and the family Virgulidae. The type species is "Grossotubenella" variabilis Senowbari-Daryan (2005); genus also includes new species T. irregularis.	
Unicornigraptus	Gen. et 3 sp. nov	Valid	Chen & Goldman in Chen et al.	Ordovician		China; Sweden	A graptolite. Genus includes new species U. minimus Chen, U. scandinavicus Goldman and U. xinjiangensis Chen and Goldman.	
Wildspongia? krystyni	Sp. nov	Valid	Senowbari-Daryan & Link	Late Triassic (Norian)	Dereköy Basin	Turkey	A demosponge belonging to the group Agelasida and the family Stellispongiellidae.	
Wronascolex geyiensis	Sp. nov	Valid	Peng et al.	Cambrian		China	A palaeoscolecid worm, a species of Wronascolex.	
Wronascolex? johanssoni	Sp. nov	Valid	Streng, Ebbestad & Berg-Madsen	Cambrian		Sweden	A palaeoscolecid worm.	
Wronascolex yichangensis	Sp. nov	Valid	Yang & Zhang	Cambrian		China	A palaeoscolecid worm, a species of Wronascolex.	
Xiphograptus aksuensis	Sp. nov	Valid	Chen in Chen et al.	Ordovician		China	A graptolite.	

== Other organisms ==
=== New taxa ===
Name	Novelty	Status	Authors	Age	Unit	Location	Notes	Images
Accordiella? tarburensis	Sp. nov	Valid	Schlagintweit & Rashidi	Late Cretaceous (Maastrichtian)	Tarbur Formation	Iran	A foraminifer belonging to the group Textulariida and the family Chrysalidinidae.	
Acuasiphonoria	Gen. et sp. nov	Valid	Liu et al.	Ordovician	Tarim Basin	China	A member of Cyanobacteria. The type species is Acuasiphonoria ordovica.	
Adnatosphaeridium ivoriense	Sp. nov	Valid	Awad & Oboh-Ikuenobe	Late Paleocene and early Eocene		Gulf of Guinea (Côte d'Ivoire-Ghana Transform Margin); Nigeria	A dinoflagellate belonging to the group Gonyaulacales.	
Agathammina vachardi	Sp. nov	Valid	Zhang in Zhang et al.	Permian	Xiala Formation	China	A foraminifer belonging to the group Miliolata and the family Cornuspiridae.	
Amsassia koreanensis	Sp. nov	Valid	Lee et al.	Middle and Late Ordovician (Darriwilian-Katian)	Duwibong Formation; Xiazhen Formation	China; South Korea	An organism of uncertain phylogenetic placement, probably a calcareous alga.	
Anchisolenopora	Gen. et comb. nov	Valid	Vachard et al.	Ordovician-Carboniferous		China; France; Norway; Sweden	A red alga, possibly related to the coralline algae. The type species is "Hedstroemia" serrana Vachard & Aretz (2004); genus also includes "Hedstroemia" nidarosiensis Høeg, 1932 emend. Roux, 1985, "Hedstroemia" koninckoporoides Vachard, 1988 and "Pseudosolenopora" owodenkoi sensu Mamet, 2002 non Chanton-Güvenç, 1972.	
Annelaurea	Gen. et sp. nov	Valid	Harper et al.	Carboniferous (late Viséan)		France	An oomycete. The type species is Annelaurea excornis.	
Aulacoseira helianthus	Sp. nov	Valid	Mohan & Stone in Mohan, Stone & Campisano	Pliocene	Hadar Formation	Ethiopia	A diatom belonging to the group Aulacoseirales and the family Aulacoseiraceae.	
Aulacoseira jewsonii	Sp. nov	Valid	Mohan & Stone in Mohan, Stone & Campisano	Pliocene	Hadar Formation	Ethiopia	A diatom belonging to the group Aulacoseirales and the family Aulacoseiraceae.	
Baltinema	Gen. et sp. nov	Valid	Slater et al.	Cambrian (Stage 4)	File Haidar Formation	Sweden	A filamentous organism of uncertain phylogenetic placement. The type species is B. rana.	
Barattolites andhuri	Sp. nov	Valid	Gallardo-Garcia & Serra-Kiel in Serra-Kiel et al.	Eocene	Dammam Formation	Oman; Yemen	A foraminifer belonging to the group Globothalamea and the family Orbitolinidae.	
Berkutaphycus	Gen. et sp. nov	Valid	Schopf, Sergeev & Kudryavtsev	Early Cambrian	Kyrshabakta Formation	Kazakhstan	An organism of uncertain phylogenetic placement; might be related to hormogonian cyanobacteria or to eukaryotic green or chrysophyte algae. The type species is Berkutaphycus elongatus.	
Bianchina	Gen. et sp. nov	Valid	Schiøler	Cretaceous (late Aptian–middle Cenomanian)	East Coast Basin	New Zealand	A dinoflagellate. The type species is Bianchina hieroglyphica.	
Bolivinides intermedius	Sp. nov	Valid	Dubicka & Peryt	Late Cretaceous (Campanian–Maastrichtian)		Poland; Ukraine	A foraminifer belonging to the group Rotaliina and the family Bolivinoididae.	
Braarudosphaera insecta	Sp. nov	Valid	Bown	Late Paleocene		Tanzania	A haptophyte belonging to the family Braarudosphaeraceae.	
Braarudosphaera wendleriae	Sp. nov	Valid	Lees & Bown	Late Cretaceous (Turonian)		Tanzania	A haptophyte belonging to the family Braarudosphaeraceae.	
Bramletteius cultellus	Sp. nov	Valid	Bown	Paleocene (Selandian)		Tanzania	A haptophyte belonging to the order Coccolithales and the family Coccolithaceae.	
Broccoliforma	Gen. et sp. nov	Valid	Mason & Narbonne	Ediacaran		Canada (Newfoundland and Labrador)	A flabellate, lobate frond with at least superficial similarities to the ivesheadiomorph Blackbrookia. The type species is B. alta.	
Bulbobaculites felixi	Sp. nov	Valid	Pleş, Bucur & Săsăran	Early Cretaceous (late Aptian)		Romania	A lituolid foraminifer.	
Caelatimurus	Gen. et sp. nov	Valid	Riedman & Porter	Mesoproterozoic and Neoproterozoic	Alinya Formation; Chuar Group; Muhos Formation; Roper Group	Australia; Finland; United States	An acritarch. Genus includes new species C. foveolatus.	
Chinggiskhaania	Gen. et sp. nov		Dornbos et al.	Ediacaran	Zuun-Arts Formation	Mongolia	A multicellular benthic alga of uncertain phylogenetic placement. The type species is Chinggiskhaania bifurcata.	
Clypeorbis? ultima	Sp. nov	Valid	Schlagintweit, Studeny & Sanders	Late Cretaceous (Maastrichtian)	Kambühel Formation	Austria	A foraminifer, possibly a member of Clypeorbinae.	
Coccolithus subcirculus	Sp. nov	Valid	Bown	Paleocene (Selandian)		Tanzania	A haptophyte, a species of Coccolithus.	
Cretaciclavulina	Gen. et sp. nov	Valid	Schlagintweit & Cvetko Tešović	Late Cretaceous (early Campanian)	Gornji Humac Formation; Pučišća Formation	Croatia	A foraminifer belonging to the superfamily Textularioidea, possibly a member of the family Valvulinidae. The type species is C. gusici.	
Cribrionella	Gen. et sp. nov	Valid	Jovanovska et al.	Quaternary		Lake Ohrid	A diatom belonging to the group Thalassiosirales and the family Stephanodiscaceae. The type species is Cribrionella ohridana	
Crinisdendrum	Gen. et sp. nov	Valid	Dzik, Baliński & Sun	Ordovician (early Floian)	Fenxiang Formation	China	An organism of uncertain phylogenetic placement; the authors of its description considered it most likely that it was a relative of pterobranchs. The type species is C. sinicum.	
Cucurbita aggtelekensis	Sp. nov	Valid	Senowbari-Daryan	Late Triassic (Carnian)		Hungary	A foraminifer belonging to the group Miliolina and the family Milioliporidae.	
Cucurbita minima	Sp. nov	Valid	Senowbari-Daryan	Late Triassic (Carnian)	Mufara Formation	Hungary; Italy; Turkey?	A foraminifer belonging to the group Miliolina and the family Milioliporidae.	
Culcitulisphaera	Gen. et sp. nov	Valid	Riedman & Porter	Late Mesoproterozoic and Neoproterozoic	Alinya Formation; Chuar Group; Eleonore Bay Group; Lakhanda Group; Visingsö Group	Australia; Botswana; Greenland; Moldova; Russia; Sweden; Ukraine; United States	An acritarch. Genus includes new species C. revelata.	
Delphineis urbinai	Sp. nov	Valid	Gariboldi	Miocene	Pisco Formation	Peru	A diatom.	
Diphyes digitum	Sp. nov	Valid	Awad & Oboh-Ikuenobe	Early Paleocene		Gulf of Guinea (Côte d'Ivoire-Ghana Transform Margin)	A dinoflagellate belonging to the group Gonyaulacales.	
Discocyclina kutchensis	Sp. nov	Valid	Özcan & Saraswati in Özcan et al.	Eocene (Bartonian)	Fulra Limestone	India; Pakistan	A foraminifer belonging to the family Discocyclinidae.	
'Discocyclina' sulaimanensis	Sp. nov	Valid	Özcan, Ali & Hanif in Özcan et al.	Eocene (Bartonian)	Drazinda Formation	Pakistan	A foraminifer belonging to the family Discocyclinidae.	
Elianella brasiliana	Sp. nov	Valid	Granier & Dias-Brito	Early Cretaceous (Albian)	Riachuelo Formation	Brazil	A red alga belonging to the group Corallinophycidae, possibly a member of Rhodogorgonales; a species of Elianella.	
Ellipsolithus linnertii	Sp. nov	Valid	Lees & Bown	Late Cretaceous (Turonian)		Tanzania	A haptophyte of uncertain phylogenetic placement.	
Ellipsolithus pumex	Sp. nov	Valid	Bown	Paleocene (Selandian)		Tanzania	A haptophyte of uncertain phylogenetic placement.	
Endoceratium immarinum	Sp. nov	Valid	Razumkova	Early Cretaceous (Aptian)		Russia	A dinoflagellate belonging to the family Ceratiaceae.	
Entosolenia intermillerelineata	Sp. nov	Valid	Margerel	Late Pliocene-early Pleistocene		France	A foraminifer belonging to the family Ellipsolagenidae.	
Eocladopyxis furculum	Sp. nov	Valid	Awad & Oboh-Ikuenobe	Paleocene to Oligocene		Gulf of Guinea (Côte d'Ivoire-Ghana Transform Margin)	A dinoflagellate belonging to the group Gonyaulacales.	
Eohalothece	Gen. et sp. nov	Valid	Strother & Wellman	Precambrian	Cailleach Head Formation; Diabaig Formation; Kinloch Formation; Nonesuch Formation	United Kingdom; United States (Michigan)	A member of Cyanobacteria belonging to the family Chroococcaceae. The type species is Eohalothece lacustrina.	
Ercumentina	Gen. et sp. nov	Valid	Serra-Kiel & Vicedo in Serra-Kiel et al.	Paleocene	Jafnayn Formation	Oman	A foraminifer belonging to the group Miliolida and the superfamily Alveolinoidea. The type species is E. sayqensis.	
Ericsonia aliquanta	Sp. nov	Valid	Bown	Paleocene (Selandian)		Tanzania	A haptophyte belonging to the order Coccolithales and the family Coccolithaceae.	
Ericsonia media	Sp. nov	Valid	Bown	Late Paleocene		Tanzania	A haptophyte belonging to the order Coccolithales and the family Coccolithaceae.	
Ericsonia monilis	Sp. nov	Valid	Bown	Paleocene (Selandian)		Tanzania	A haptophyte belonging to the order Coccolithales and the family Coccolithaceae.	
Ericsonia orbis	Sp. nov	Valid	Bown	Paleocene (Selandian)		Tanzania	A haptophyte belonging to the order Coccolithales and the family Coccolithaceae.	
Galerosphaera	Gen. et comb. nov	Valid	Porter & Riedman	Neoproterozoic	Chuar Group	United States (Arizona)	An organic-walled microfossil; a new genus for "Vandalosphaeridium" walcottii Vidal & Ford (1985).	
Gemmaphyton	Gen. et sp. nov	Valid	Wang et al.	Ediacaran	Doushantuo Formation	China	A macrofossil organism of uncertain phylogenetic placement, possibly an alga. The type species is G. taoyingensis.	
Glomospirella cantabrica	Sp. nov	Valid	Schlagintweit, Rosales & Najarro	Early Cretaceous (Aptian-Albian)	Las Peñosas Formation; Reocín Formation	Spain	A foraminifer belonging to the class Tubothalamea, the order Ammodiscida and the family Ammodiscidae.	
Gomphosiphon	Gen. et sp. nov	Valid	Liu et al.	Ordovician	Tarim Basin	China	A possible member of Cyanobacteria. The type species is Gomphosiphon xinjiangensis.	
Helicolithus blairiae	Sp. nov	Valid	Kita, Watkins & Bergen	Late Cretaceous (late Santonian)	Niobrara Formation	United States (Kansas)	A haptophyte belonging to the family Eiffellithaceae.	
Hyalolithus tumescens	Sp. nov	Valid	Abe, Tsutsui & Jordan	Eocene		Barbados; United States (California)	A haptophyte belonging to the group Prymnesiales.	
Idalina grelaudae	Sp. nov	Valid	Gallardo-Garcia & Serra-Kiel in Serra-Kiel et al.	Eocene		Oman; Yemen	A foraminifer belonging to the group Miliolida and the family Hauerinidae.	
Idalina pignattii	Sp. nov	Valid	Gallardo-Garcia & Serra-Kiel in Serra-Kiel et al.	Oligocene	Ashawq Formation	Oman; Yemen	A foraminifer belonging to the group Miliolida and the family Hauerinidae.	
Jimenezberrocosoia	Gen. et comb. et sp. nov	Valid	Lees & Bown	Cretaceous (Aptian-Turonian)		North Sea Basin; Tanzania	A haptophyte belonging to the family Biscutaceae. Genus includes "Crucibiscutum" bosunensis Jeremiah (2001), as well as new species J. birchiae.	
Jodhpurophycus	Gen. et sp. nov	Valid	Kumar & Ahmad	Ediacaran	Jodhpur Sandstone	India	A possible alga of uncertain phylogenetic placement. Genus includes new species J. marwarensis.	
Kaibabia	Gen. et sp. nov	Disputed	Porter & Riedman	Neoproterozoic	Chuar Group	United States (Arizona)	An organic-walled microfossil. Genus includes new species K. gemmulella. Loron & Moczydłowska (2018) considered the genus Kaibabia to be a junior synonym of the genus Leiosphaeridia, and transferred the species K. gemmulella to the latter genus.	
Karenagare	Gen. et sp. nov	Valid	Riedman & Porter	Neoproterozoic	Alinya Formation	Australia; Russia?	An acritarch. Genus includes new species K. alinyaensis.	
Kokia kayae	Sp. nov	Valid	Lees & Bown	Late Cretaceous (Turonian)		Tanzania	A microfossil.	
Lacazinella rogeri	Sp. nov	Valid	Serra-Kiel & Vicedo in Serra-Kiel et al.	Paleocene	Jafnayn Formation	Oman	A foraminifer belonging to the group Miliolida and the family Fabulariidae.	
Lanternithus unicavus	Sp. nov	Valid	Bown	Paleocene (Selandian)		Tanzania	A haptophyte belonging to the family Calyptrosphaeraceae.	
Lantianella	Gen. et 2 sp. nov	Valid	Wan et al.	Early Ediacaran	Lantian Formation	China	An organism of uncertain phylogenetic placement; might be a cnidarian (the possibility considered to be most likely by the authors of its description), or a macroalga. The type species is Lantianella laevis; genus also includes L. annularis.	
Lanulatisphaera	Gen. et comb. nov	Valid	Porter & Riedman	Neoproterozoic	Alinya Formation; Chuar Group; Karuyarvinskaya Formation; Visingsö Group	Australia; Russia; Sweden; United States (Arizona); Greenland? Norway?	An organic-walled microfossil; a new genus for "Trachysphaeridium" laufeldi Vidal (1976).	
Latiortenuiphyton	Gen. et sp. nov	Valid	Wang et al.	Ediacaran	Doushantuo Formation	China	A macroscopic alga of uncertain phylogenetic placement. The type species is L. robusta.	
Lindavia cohenii	Sp. nov	Valid	Mohan & Stone in Mohan, Stone & Campisano	Pliocene	Hadar Formation	Ethiopia	A diatom belonging to the group Thalassiosirales and the family Stephanodiscaceae.	
Macetadiscus	Gen. et sp. nov	Valid	Hottinger, Serra-Kiel & Gallardo-Garcia in Serra-Kiel et al.	Eocene		Oman; Yemen	A foraminifer belonging to the group Miliolida and the family Soritidae. The type species is M. incolumnatus.	
Mallomonas elephantus	Sp. nov	Valid	Siver & Wolfe	Eocene		Canada	A synurophyte, a species of Mallomonas.	
Megacrassispirella	Gen. et comb. nov	Valid	Zhang in Zhang et al.	Permian	Xiala Formation	China	A foraminifer belonging to the group Miliolata and the family Cornuspiridae. A new genus for "Ammodiscus" xarlashanensis Wang (1986).	
Microlepidopalla	Gen. et sp. nov	Valid	Porter & Riedman	Neoproterozoic, possibly also Mesoproterozoic	Chuar Group; Moosehorn Lake Formation; Muhos Formation?	United States (Arizona); Finland?	An organic-walled microfossil. Genus includes new species M. mira.	
Morgensternia	Gen. et sp. nov	Valid	Riedman & Porter	Neoproterozoic	Alinya Formation	Australia	An acritarch. Genus includes new species M. officerensis.	
Nannoconus funiculus	Sp. nov	Valid	Lees & Bown	Late Cretaceous (Turonian)		Tanzania	A haptophyte belonging to the family Nannoconaceae.	
Nodocantabricus	Gen. et sp. nov	Valid	Rigaud & Schlagintweit	Late Cretaceous (Cenomanian)	Altamira Formation; Bielba Formation	Spain	A foraminifer belonging to the family Polymorphinidae. Genus includes new species N. duplexmurus.	
Nyktericysta sibirica	Sp. nov	Valid	Razumkova	Early Cretaceous (Aptian)		Russia	A dinoflagellate belonging to the family Ceratiaceae.	
Omanodiscus	Gen. et sp. nov	Valid	Hottinger, Serra-Kiel & Gallardo-Garcia in Serra-Kiel et al.	Eocene		Oman	A foraminifer belonging to the group Miliolida and the family Soritidae. The type species is O. tenuissimus.	
Oolina barkeri	Sp. nov	Valid	Margerel	Late Pliocene-early Pleistocene		France	A foraminifer belonging to the family Ellipsolagenidae.	
Oolina falsoscalariformis	Sp. nov	Valid	Margerel	Early Pliocene		France	A foraminifer belonging to the family Ellipsolagenidae.	
Ortonellopsis	Gen. et sp. et comb. nov	Valid	Vachard & Cózar in Vachard et al.	Silurian-Triassic		Canada; France; Greece; Spain	A member of Cyanobacteria belonging to the family Garwoodiaceae. The type species is O. laxa; genus also includes "Ortonella" mansellensis (Poncet, 1986) and "Ortonella" myrae Rácz (1964).	
Paragraptobranca	Gen. et sp. nov	Valid	Wang et al.	Ediacaran	Doushantuo Formation	China	A macrofossil organism of uncertain phylogenetic placement, might be a macroalga or an animal. The type species is P. curvus.	
Perissothallus dekovensis	Sp. nov	Valid	Pšenička & Krings	Carboniferous (Gzhelian)	Slaný Formation	Czech Republic	An alga of uncertain phylogenetic placement, a species of Perissothallus.	
Petrarhabdus? kirenii	Sp. nov	Valid	Lees & Bown	Late Cretaceous (Turonian)		Tanzania	A haptophyte belonging to the family Prediscosphaeraceae.	
Piyuania	Gen. et sp. nov	Valid	Wan et al.	Early Ediacaran	Lantian Formation	China	An organism of uncertain phylogenetic placement, possibly a cnidarian-grade animal. The type species is P. cyathiformis.	
Plumeropriscum	Gen. et sp. nov	Valid	Mason & Narbonne	Ediacaran		Canada (Newfoundland and Labrador)	A mop-like rangeomorph. The type species is P. hofmanni.	
Pontosphaera veta	Sp. nov	Valid	Bown	Paleocene (Selandian)		Tanzania	A haptophyte belonging to the order Zygodiscales and the family Pontosphaeraceae.	
Proaulopora pachydermatica	Sp. nov	Valid	Liu et al.	Ordovician	Tarim Basin	China	A possible member of Cyanobacteria, a species of Proaulopora.	
Pseudoaccordiella	Gen. et sp. nov	Valid	Gallardo-Garcia & Serra-Kiel in Serra-Kiel et al.	Eocene		Oman; Yemen	A foraminifer belonging to the group Globothalamea and the family Pfenderinidae. The type species is P. ayaki.	
Pseudodoushantuophyton	Gen. et sp. nov	Valid	Wang et al.	Ediacaran	Doushantuo Formation	China	A probably a macroalga. The type species is P. wenghuiensis.	
Pseudolituonella robineti	Sp. nov	Valid	Gallardo-Garcia & Serra-Kiel in Serra-Kiel et al.	Eocene	Aydim Formation	Oman; Yemen	A foraminifer belonging to the group Globothalamea and the family Coskinolinidae.	
Pseudonumoloculina kalantarii	Sp. nov	Valid	Schlagintweit & Rashidi	Late Cretaceous (Maastrichtian)	Tarbur Formation	Iran	A foraminifer belonging to the family Hauerinidae.	
Pseudorhapydionina bilottei	Sp. nov	Valid	Consorti, Boix & Caus	Late Cretaceous (Santonian)	La Cova Unit	Spain	A foraminifer belonging to the group Miliolida and the family Praerhapydioninidae.	
Qianchuania	Gen. et sp. nov	Valid	Wan et al.	Early Ediacaran	Lantian Formation	China	An organism of uncertain phylogenetic placement, possibly a cnidarian-grade animal. The type species is Q. fusiformis.	
Rogerella	Gen. et sp. nov	Valid	Gallardo-Garcia & Serra-Kiel in Serra-Kiel et al.	Eocene	Aydim Formation	Oman; Yemen	A foraminifer belonging to the group Globothalamea and the family Orbitolinidae. The type species is R. aydimi.	
Rossanella	Gen. et sp. nov	Valid	Rigaud & Blau	Early Jurassic (Hettangian–Sinemurian)	Schnöll Formation	Austria	A foraminifer belonging to the group Robertinida and the family Conorboididae. The type species is R. martinii.	
Rothpletzella longita	Sp. nov	Valid	Liu et al.	Ordovician	Tarim Basin	China	A microorganism of uncertain phylogenetic placement, a species of Rothpletzella.	
Socotraella	Gen. et sp. nov	Valid	Gallardo-Garcia & Serra-Kiel in Serra-Kiel et al.	Oligocene	Ashawq Formation; Aydim Formation	Oman; Yemen	A foraminifer belonging to the group Globothalamea and the family Valvulinidae. The type species is S. ashawqi.	
Solisphaera palmula	Sp. nov	Valid	Bown	Middle-Late Paleocene		Tanzania	A haptophyte belonging to the order Syracosphaerales, related to the family Rhabdosphaeraceae.	
Solisphaera tegula	Sp. nov	Valid	Bown	Middle Paleocene to Middle Eocene		Tanzania	A haptophyte belonging to the order Syracosphaerales, related to the family Rhabdosphaeraceae.	
Sphenolithus pospichalii	Sp. nov	Valid	Jiang et al.	Early Miocene		Northern shelf of the South China Sea	A microfossil.	
Spirolina? farsiana	Sp. nov	Valid	Schlagintweit & Rashidi	Late Cretaceous (Maastrichtian)	Tarbur Formation	Iran	A foraminifer belonging to the group Miliolida and the superfamily Soritoidea.	
Surninia	Gen. et sp. nov	Valid	Kolosov	Ediacaran		Russia	A microorganism. Genus includes new species S. implicata.	
Tectatodinium nigeriaense	Sp. nov	Valid	Awad & Oboh-Ikuenobe	Paleocene		Gulf of Guinea (Côte d'Ivoire-Ghana Transform Margin); Nigeria	A dinoflagellate belonging to the group Gonyaulacales.	
Tongrenphyton	Gen. et sp. nov	Valid	Wang et al.	Ediacaran	Doushantuo Formation	China	A probably a eukaryotic alga. The type species is T. komma.	
Toweius patellus	Sp. nov	Valid	Bown	Paleocene (Selandian)		Tanzania	A haptophyte belonging to the order Isochrysidales and the family Prinsiaceae.	
Toweius reticulum	Sp. nov	Valid	Bown	Late Paleocene		Tanzania	A haptophyte belonging to the order Isochrysidales and the family Prinsiaceae.	
Trochoguembelitria liuae	Sp. nov	Valid	Arenillas, Arz & Náñez	Paleocene (early Danian)	El Haria Formation	Tunisia	A foraminifer belonging to the group Heterohelicacea and the family Guembelitriidae.	
Trochoguembelitria olssoni	Sp. nov	Valid	Arenillas, Arz & Náñez	Paleocene (early Danian)	El Haria Formation	Tunisia	A foraminifer belonging to the group Heterohelicacea and the family Guembelitriidae.	
Velleditsiella	Gen. et 2 sp. nov	Valid	Rigaud & Blau	Early Jurassic (Hettangian–Sinemurian)	Schnöll Formation	Austria	A foraminifer belonging to the group Robertinida and the family Trochosiphoniidae. The type species is V. felicitaszae; genus also includes V. spinaferra.	
Vendophycus	Gen. et 2 sp. nov	Valid	Kumar & Ahmad	Ediacaran	Jodhpur Sandstone	India	A possible alga of uncertain phylogenetic placement. Genus includes new species V. rajasthanensis and V. sursagarensis.	
Vidalopalla	Gen. et comb. nov	Valid	Riedman & Porter	Mesoproterozoic and Neoproterozoic	Alinya Formation; Baffin Bay Group; Ekkerøy Formation; Klubbnes Formation; Ruyang Group	Australia; China; Greenland; India; Norway; Russia; United States	A microfossil. Genus includes "Kildinosphaera" verrucata Vidal in Vidal & Siedlecka (1983), as well as "Kildinosphaera" granulata Vidal in Vidal & Siedlecka (1983).	
Volleyballia	Gen. et sp. nov	Valid	Porter & Riedman	Mesoproterozoic and Neoproterozoic	Alinya Formation; Browne Formation; Chuar Group; Conselheiro Mata Group	Australia; Botswana; Brazil; United States (Arizona)	An organic-walled microfossil. Genus includes new species V. dehlerae.	
Xianella	Gen. et sp. nov	Valid	Lee & Riding	Middle–Late Ordovician		China	A member of Cyanobacteria. The type species is X. hongii.	
Xiuningella	Gen. et sp. nov	Valid	Wan et al.	Early Ediacaran	Lantian Formation	China	An organism of uncertain phylogenetic placement; might be a worm-like animal or an alga. The type species is X. rara.	
Youngilithus bipons	Sp. nov	Valid	Bown	Paleocene (Selandian)		Tanzania	A haptophyte belonging to the family Calyptrosphaeraceae.	
Youngilithus transversipons	Sp. nov	Valid	Bown	Middle-Late Paleocene		Tanzania	A haptophyte belonging to the family Calyptrosphaeraceae.	
Zuunartsphyton	Gen. et sp. nov		Dornbos et al.	Ediacaran	Zuun-Arts Formation	Mongolia	A multicellular benthic alga of uncertain phylogenetic placement. The type species is Zuunartsphyton delicatum.	

=== Research ===
- Probable stromatolites are described from the 3,700-Myr-old rocks from the Isua supracrustal belt (Greenland) by Nutman et al. (2016); however, Allwood et al. (2018) subsequently argue that these putative stromatolites as more likely to be structures of non-biological origin.
- Exceptionally large, organic, smooth-walled, coccoidal microfossils are described from the 2.52 Ga Gamohaan Formation (South Africa) by Czaja, Beukes & Osterhout (2016), who interpret them as fossils of sulfur-oxidizing bacteria similar to members of the modern genus Thiomargarita.
- Macroscopic fossils up to 30 cm long and nearly 8 cm wide are described from the 1,56-billion-year-old Gaoyuzhuang Formation (Yanshan area, North China) by Zhu et al. (2016), who interpret them as probable fossils of benthic multicellular eukaryotes of size that is unprecedentedly large for eukaryotes older than the Ediacaran Period.
- Organic-walled microfossils (at least some of which are eukaryote fossils) with holes in the walls similar to those formed by predatory protists in the walls of their prey to consume the contents inside are described from the 780–740 million-year-old Chuar Group (Grand Canyon, Arizona, USA) by Porter (2016).
- Tubular microfossils showing similarities to modern coenocytic green and yellow-green algae are described from the ~2.8 to 2.7 Ga lacustrine deposits in South Africa by Kaźmierczak et al. (2016).
- Soft-bodied discoidal specimens resembling Aspidella are described from the Ediacaran Cerro Negro Formation (Argentina) by Arrouy et al. (2016).
