= Margaretta (bryozoan) =

Scientific classification
- Kingdom: Animalia
- Phylum: Bryozoa
- Class: Gymnolaemata
- Order: Cheilostomatida
- Family: Margarettidae
- Genus: Margaretta; Gray, 1843

Genus of Bryozoa - Gray, 1843

Margaretta is a genus of bryozoans belonging to the family Margarettidae.

The genus has cosmopolitan distribution.

Species:

- Margaretta amitabhae Di Martino & Taylor, 2015
- Margaretta amplipora Sonar & Gaikwad, 2016
- Margaretta aquitanica Canu, 1918
- Margaretta barbata (Lamarck, 1816)
- Margaretta bipartita (Reuss, 1869)
- Margaretta buski Harmer, 1957
- Margaretta cereoides (Ellis & Solander, 1786)
- Margaretta chuakensis (Waters, 1907)
- Margaretta coeca (Ortmann, 1890)
- Margaretta congesta (Cheetham, 1963)
- Margaretta fallax (Canu & Bassler, 1920)
- Margaretta filiformis (Canu & Bassler, 1929)
- Margaretta fusiformis Guha & Gopikrishna, 2007
- Margaretta gracilior (Ortmann, 1892)
- Margaretta gracilis (Canu & Bassler, 1929)
- Margaretta guhai Sonar & Gaikwad, 2016
- Margaretta hariparensis Sonar & Gaikwad, 2016
- Margaretta levinseni (Canu & Bassler, 1930)
- Margaretta longicollis Tilbrook, 2006
- Margaretta nodifera (Canu & Bassler, 1920)
- Margaretta opuntioides (Pallas, 1766)
- Margaretta parviporosa (Canu & Bassler, 1920)
- Margaretta pentaceratops Di Martino, Taylor & Portell, 2017
- Margaretta punctata (Tenison Woods, 1880)
- Margaretta rajui Guha & Gopikrishna, 2007
- Margaretta tenuis Harmer, 1957
- Margaretta triplex Harmer, 1957
- Margaretta turgida (Terawi & Srivastava, 1967)
- Margaretta vicksburgica (Canu & Bassler, 1920)
- Margaretta watersi (Canu & Bassler, 1930)
