= Metastenodiscus =

Metastenodiscus Temporal range: 212.0–205.6 Ma

Scientific classification
- Kingdom: Animalia
- Phylum: Bryozoa
- Class: Stenolaemata
- Order: †Trepostomatida
- Family: †Stenoporidae
- Genus: †Metastenodiscus; Ernst, Schäfer & Grant-Mackie, 2015

Extinct genus of bryozoans

Metastenodiscus is an extinct genus of Triassic trepostome bryozoans of the family Stenoporidae. It is distinct from Stenodiscus because of the presence of cystiphragms and the presence of a wide range of sizes of acanthostyles.
