= Neogondolella =

Neogondolella Temporal range: Moscovian–Norian

Scientific classification
- Kingdom: Animalia
- Phylum: Chordata
- Infraphylum: Agnatha
- Class: †Conodonta
- Order: †Ozarkodinida
- Family: †Gondolellidae
- Genus: †Neogondolella; Clark, 1959

Type species
- †Neogondolella carinata Clark, 1959

Species
- †Neogondolella carinata; †Neogondolella excentrica; †Neogondolella excentrica primitiva; †Neogondolella excentrica sigmoidalis; †Neogondolella regalis

Extinct genus of conodonts

Neogondolella is an extinct genus of conodonts. Neogondolella regalis was re-evaluated in 2018 by Martyn Lee Golding.
