= Rugatotheca =

Rugatotheca Temporal range: Meishucunian

Scientific classification
- Kingdom: Animalia
- Phylum: †Problematica
- Genus: †Rugatotheca; He, 1980
- Species: †R. typica

Binomial name
- †Rugatotheca typica He, 1980

Species of tubular organism of the Cambrian

Rugatotheca typica is a species of problematic tubular organism of the Cambrian. The species has been reported from China and Iran.
