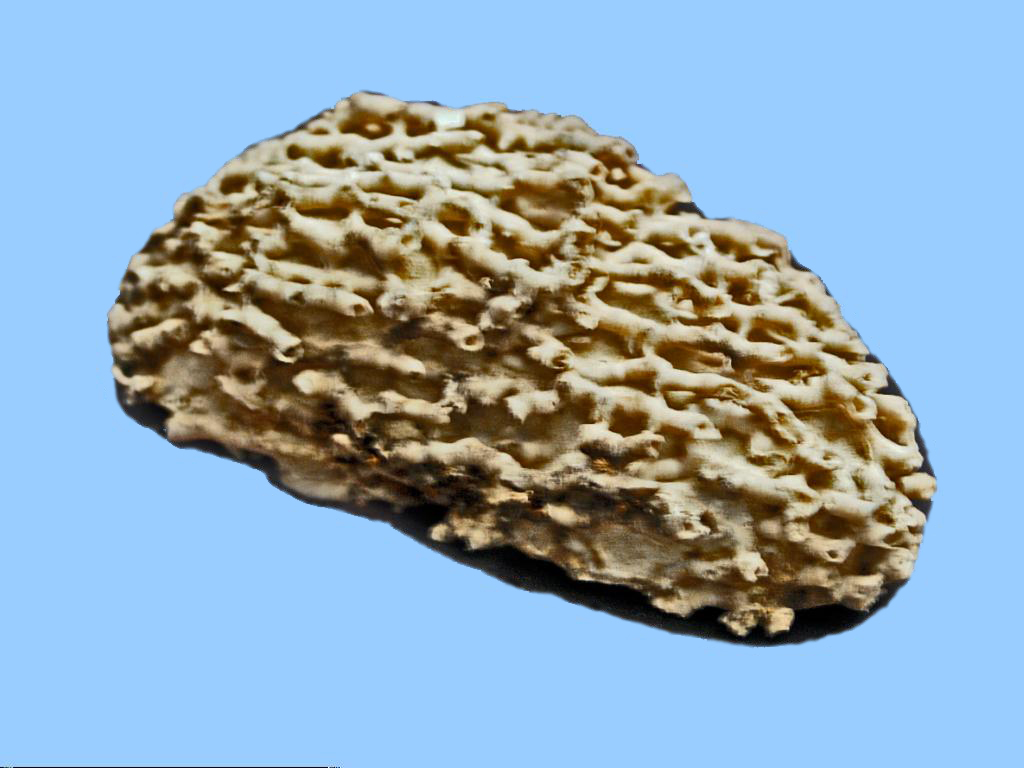
- Syringopora verticellata

Scientific classification
- Domain: Eukaryota
- Kingdom: Animalia
- Phylum: Cnidaria
- Subphylum: Anthozoa
- Class: †Tabulata
- Family: †Syringoporidae; Fromentel 1861

= Syringoporidae =

Syringoporidae Temporal range: Ordovician to Permian

Extinct family of corals

Syringoporidae is an extinct family of phaceloid tabulate coral.

These tabulate corals lived from the Ordovician to the Permian period (from 449.5 to 279.5 Ma). Fossils of species belonging to the Syringoporidae family have been found in the sediments of Europe, Russia, China, Japan, Thailand, Australia, Canada and the United States.

== Genera ==
- Cannapora Hall 1852
- Chia Lin 1958
- Enigmalites Tchudinova 1975
- Kueichowpora Chi 1933
- Oharaia Nelson 1977
- Pleurosiphonella Chudinova 1970
- Spinuliplena Pickett 1994
- Syringoalcyon Termier and Termier 1945
- Syringocolumna Stumm 1969
- Syringopora Goldfuss 1826
- Syringoporiella Rukhin 1937
- Vinculumtes Khayznikova 1989
