= Margarettidae =

Scientific classification
- Domain: Eukaryota
- Kingdom: Animalia
- Phylum: Bryozoa
- Class: Gymnolaemata
- Order: Cheilostomatida
- Family: Margarettidae

Family of bryozoans

Margarettidae is a family of bryozoans belonging to the order Cheilostomatida.

Genera:

- Margaretta Gray, 1843
- Tubucella Canu & Bassler, 1917
