= Plagiochasma (echinoderm) =

Scientific classification
- Kingdom: Animalia
- Phylum: Echinodermata
- Class: Echinoidea
- Family: †Pygaulidae
- Genus: †Plagiochasma; Pomel, 1883

Species
- See text

Extinct genus of sea urchins

Plagiochasma is an extinct echinoderm genus in the family Pygaulidae.

Species include:

- Plagiochasma cruciferum (Morton, 1830); Paleocene of Denmark, Belgium, The Netherlands, Trinidad and the United States
- Plagiochasma faringdonense (Wright, 1875); Lower Greensand, Upper Aptian, Early Cretaceous of UK
- Plagiochasma olfersii (L. Agassiz, 1836); Hauterivian, Early Cretaceous of France and Switzerland
- Plagiochasma saurai Forner i Valls, 2016; Barremian, Early Cretaceous of Spain
- Plagiochasma texanum Smith & Rader, 2009; Lower Albian, Texas, USA
