= Siegenian =

Geological epoch during the Devonian

The Siegenian was an epoch of the Devonian period spanning from 411.2 +/- 2.8 To 407 +/- 2.8 Ma. The term overlaps with parts of the internationally recognised Pragian and Emsian epochs, and although once widely used is now deprecated.
