= Nasakia =

Nasakia Temporal range: Burgess Shale

Scientific classification
- Kingdom: Animalia
- Phylum: Brachiopoda
- Class: †Obolellata
- Order: †Naukatida
- Family: †Tomteluvidae
- Genus: †Nasakia
- Species: †N. thulensis

Binomial name
- †Nasakia thulensis Streng et al 2016

Extinct genus of brachiopods

Nasakia is a genus of Naukatid brachiopod known from Cambrian strata. There is a species called Nasakia thulensis. It was found by Streng, Butler, Peel, Garwood and Caron in 2016. and was a marine organism during the Miaolangian stage of the Cambrian, about 508 million years ago.
