= Proaulopora =

Proaulopora Temporal range: Lower Cambrian–Upper Ordovician

Scientific classification
- Domain: Bacteria
- Phylum: Cyanobacteria
- Class: Cyanophyceae
- Order: Nostocales
- Genus: †Proaulopora; Vologdin in Krasnopeeva, 1937

Type species
- Proaulopora rarissima Vologdin, 1937

Synonyms
- Amganella Reitlinger, 1959; Palaeonites Maslov, 1956; Tubophyllum Krasnopeeva, 1955; Vologdinella Korde, 1957

Fossil genus of calcareous algae

Proaulopora is a Cambrian–Ordovician fossil genus of calcareous algae. It has been variously thought to belong to the green algae, red algae or cyanobacteria. It was originally established by the Russian paleontologist Aleksandr Grigoryevich Vologdin in 1937, for species known from the Lower Cambrian of the western Altai Mountains.

In some older classifications of fossil algae genera, Proaulopora is placed in the family Proauloporaceae in order Proauloporales. In 2020, the genus was assigned to the cyanobacteria order Nostocales.

Proaulopora resembles some species of the extant rivulariacean genus Dichothrix, and has also been compared with the genus Calothrix.

== Species ==
The genus contains the following species:

- Proaulopora composita Korde, 1973
- Proaulopora crassa Korde, 1973
- Proaulopora extincta Korde, 1973
- Proaulopora glabra Krasnopeeva, 1937 (Synonyms: Epiphyton (?) jacutii Maslov, 1937; Tubophyllum victori Krasnopeeva, 1955; Palaeonites jacutii Maslov, 1956; Vologdinella fragile Korde, 1957)
- Proaulopora longa Korde, 1973
- Proaulopora microspora Korde, 1973
- Proaulopora ordosia Liu, et al., 2020
- Proaulopora pachydermatica Liu, Wu, Yang & Riding, 2016
- Proaulopora rarissima Vologdin, 1937 (Synonyms: Proaulopora sajanica Korde, 1960; Proaulopora flexuosa Korde, 1973)
- Proaulopora recta Korde, 1973

As Vologdinella K.B. Korde, the following additional species are listed on AlgaeBase:

- Vologdinella grandis Korde, 1973
- Vologdinella pulchra Korde, 1973

It is unknown whether the above species have been transferred to Proaulopora or have become synonyms.
