= Ixtaltepec Formation =

Geologic formation in Mexico

- Stratigraphic range: Pennsylvanian
- Type: Formation

Location
- Region: Oaxaca
- Country: Mexico

The Ixtaltepec Formation is a geologic formation in Oaxaca state, southwestern Mexico.

It preserves fossils dating back to the Pennsylvanian epoch of the Carboniferous period.

== See also ==
- List of fossiliferous stratigraphic units in Mexico
