= Stenodiscus =

Stenodiscus Temporal range: Mississippian-Upper Permian 346.7–252.17 Ma

Scientific classification
- Kingdom: Animalia
- Phylum: Bryozoa
- Class: Stenolaemata
- Order: †Trepostomatida
- Family: †Stenoporidae
- Genus: †Stenodiscus; Crockford 1945

Extinct genus of bryozoan

Stenodiscus is an extinct genus of bryozoan of the family Stenoporidae, known from the Carboniferous to the Upper Permian periods. Its colonies were large and could be encrusting, massive, or branching, sometimes made of multiple layers of growth over themselves, and usually possessed monticules with abundant large acanthostyles.

== Species ==
The following species are recognized:

- †Stenodiscus altiplana Sakagami 1995
- †Stenodiscus anfuensis Li 1985
- †Stenodiscus aohenqulutensis Liu 1980
- †Stenodiscus belemnos Liu 1980
- †Stenodiscus bifucatus Liu 1980
- †Stenodiscus chaetetiformis Waagen and Wentzel 1886
- †Stenodiscus giganteus Yang 1958
- †Stenodiscus incertus Morozova 1970
- †Stenodiscus inclutus Liu 1980
- †Stenodiscus instabilis Liu 1980
- †Stenodiscus manchuriensis Yabe and Sugiyama 1942
- †Stenodiscus megatubulus Li 1977
- †Stenodiscus monilifer Morozova 1970
- †Stenodiscus moniliformis Crockford 1945
- †Stenodiscus murdockensis Gilmour et al. 1997
- †Stenodiscus permianus Kiseleva 1970
- †Stenodiscus polylamellatus Liu 1980
- †Stenodiscus sijiashanensis Liu 1980
- †Stenodiscus simplex Lu 1982
- †Stenodiscus tumenlingensis Liu 1980
- †Stenodiscus xizangensis Xia 1986
