= Treatise on Invertebrate Paleontology =

Ongoing series of zoology books

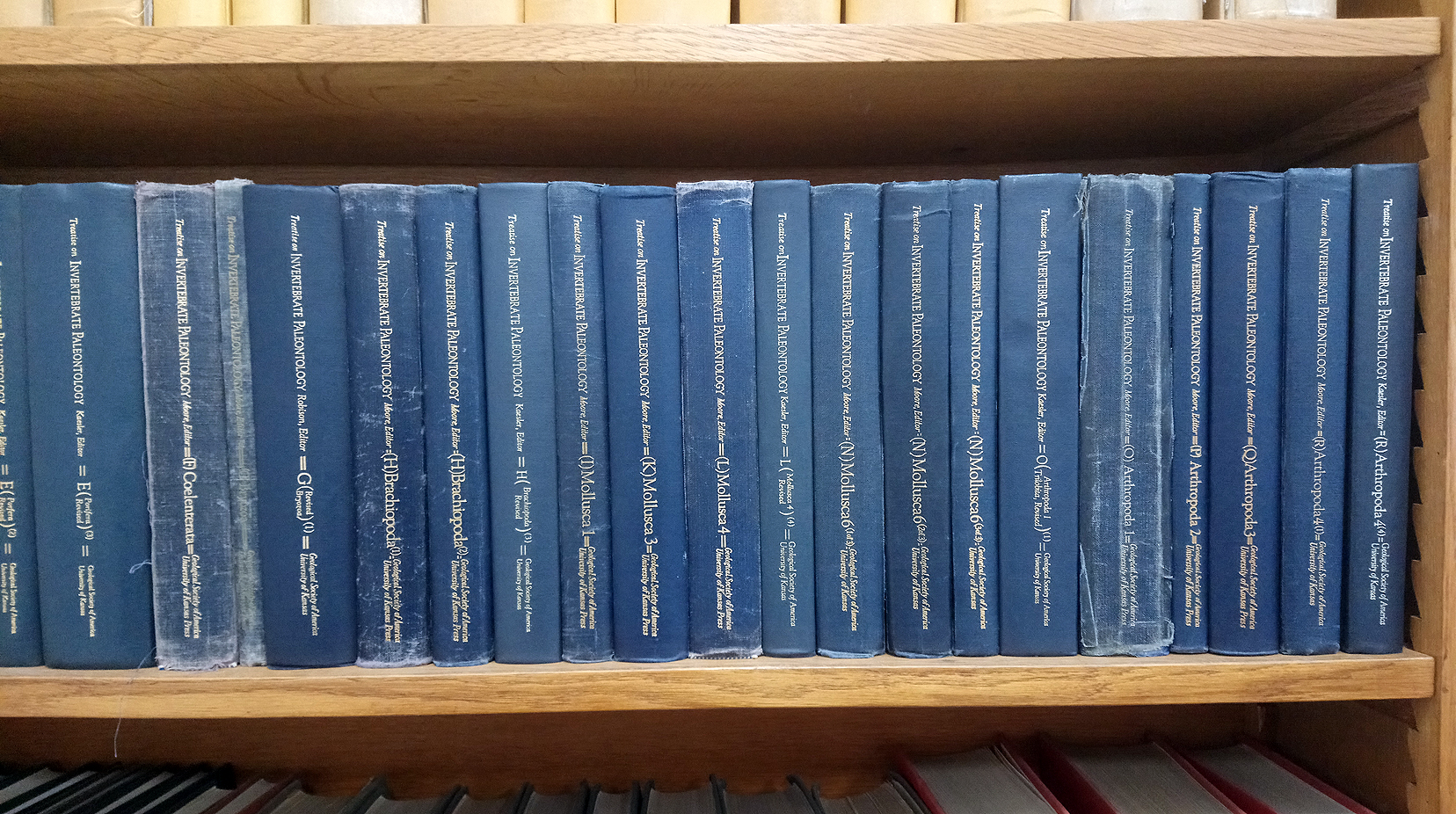
Treatise on Invertebrate Paleontology (incomplete set), among other reference books. Library of the Institute of Paleobiology (Polish Academy of Sciences) in Warsaw (reading room).

The Treatise on Invertebrate Paleontology, published from 1953–1966 by the Geological Society of America and the University of Kansas Press, 1969–2007 by the Geological Society of America and the University of Kansas, then 2009–present by the University of Kansas Paleontological Institute, is a definitive multi-authored work of currently 55 volumes, written by more than 300 paleontologists, and covering every phylum, class, order, family, and genus of fossil and extant (still living) invertebrate animals. The prehistoric invertebrates are described as to their taxonomy, morphology, paleoecology, stratigraphic and paleogeographic range. However, taxa with no fossil record whatsoever have just a very brief listing.

Publication of the decades-long Treatise on Invertebrate Paleontology is a work-in-progress; and therefore it is not yet complete: For example, there is no volume yet published regarding the post-Paleozoic era caenogastropods (a molluscan group including the whelk and periwinkle). Furthermore, when needed, previously published volumes of the Treatise are revised.

== Evolution of the project ==
Raymond C. Moore, the project's founder and first editor, originally envisioned this Treatise on Invertebrate Paleontology as comprising just three large volumes, and totaling only three thousand pages. The Treatise project has expanded far beyond that original expectation.

The project began with work on a few, mostly slim volumes in which a single senior specialist in a distinct field of invertebrate paleozoology would summarize one particular group. As a result, each publication became a comprehensive compilation of everything known at that time for each group. Examples of this stage of the project are Part G. Bryozoa, by Ray S. Bassler (the first volume, published in 1953), and Part P. Arthropoda Part 2, the Chelicerata by Alexander Petrunkevitch (1955/1956).

Around 1959 or 1960, as more and larger invertebrate groups were being addressed, the incompleteness of the then-current state of affairs became apparent. So several senior editors of the Treatise started major research programs to fill in the evident gaps. Consequently, the succeeding volumes, while still maintaining the original format, began to change from being a set of single-authored compilations into being major research projects in their own right. Newer volumes had a committee and a chief editor for each volume, with yet other authors and researchers assigned particular sections. Museum collections that had not been previously described were studied; and sometimes new major taxonomic families—and even orders—had to be described. More attention was given to transitional fossils and evolutionary radiation—eventually producing a much-more complete encyclopedia of invertebrate paleontology.

But even in the second set of volumes, the various taxa were still described and organized in a classical Linnaean sense. The more-recent volumes began to introduce phylogenetic and cladistic ideas, along with new developments and discoveries in fields such as biogeography, molecular phylogeny, paleobiology, and organic chemistry, so that the current edition of Brachiopoda (1997 to 2002) is classified according to a cladistic arrangement, with three subphyla and a large number of classes replacing the original two classes of Articulata and Inarticulata.

All these discoveries led to revisions and additional volumes. Even those taxa already covered were expanded: Books such as those regarding the Cnidaria (Part F), the Brachiopoda (Part H) and the Trilobita (Part O) each went from one modest publication to three large volumes. The Porifera (Part E) revision resulted in five volumes while the Brachiopoda (Part H) revision concluded with six volumes.

== Editors of the Treatise on Invertebrate Paleontology ==
Raymond C. Moore, the founder of the Paleontological Institute was the first editor of the Treatise on Invertebrate Paleontology, serving from 1953–1969. As Moore stated in the Editorial Preface to the first published Treatise volume, “the aim of the Treatise on Invertebrate Paleontology is … to present the most comprehensive and authoritative, yet compact statement of knowledge concerning invertebrate fossil groups that can be formulated by collaboration of competent specialists.” Moore’s idea was that the Treatise “could serve two purposes: summarizing the past and looking to the future.”

The initial purpose of the Paleontological Institute was to expedite the Treatise project. Moore’s vision and guidance of the project, beginning with the first published volume in 1953, set the template for all subsequent Treatise volumes. Since Moore’s original idea was that the Treatise would not publish new genera, he accordingly oversaw the creation of the journal Paleontological Contributions in which systematic and taxonomic papers would be published containing new material that would eventually be published in the Treatise. In addition to editing the Treatise, Moore himself also contributed, to some extent, to nine individual volumes: Part D Protista 3, 1954; Part F Coelenterata, 1954; Part K, Mollusca 3, 1964; Part L Mollusca 4, 1957; Part O Arthropoda 1, 1959; Part R Arthropoda 4, 1969; Part S Echinodermata 1, 1967; Part T Echinodermata 2, 1978; Part U Echinodermata 3, 1966.

Before his retirement, Moore brought onboard Curt Teichert, whose first responsibility was to produce Revisions and Supplements to existing Treatise volumes. When Moore retired in 1969, Teichert took over the role of editor of the Treatise. Teichert’s initial responsibilities were the revisions of Part E Porifera,1972; Part V Graptolithina,1970; and Part E Archaeocyatha,1972; and contributions to supplements Part F, Coelenterata,1981; and Part W Miscellanea, 1975. Teichert then also oversaw the publication of Part N Bivalvia, 1969 and 1971; and Part R Arthropoda, 1969.

One interesting change brought about during Teichert’s reign was the idea that the revisions and supplements would be printed not with the traditional dark blue binding, but the Revisions bound in olive green and the Supplements in brown, thus distinguishing Teichert’s contributions to the project from Moore’s. This custom would not last beyond 1972, with all subsequent Treatise volumes printed with the traditional dark blue binding.

Curt Teichert retired in 1977. At that time Richard A. Robison succeeded Teichert and served as editor from 1977–1985. Robison oversaw the publication of Part A Introduction, 1979; Part F Coelenterata, 1981; Part G Bryozoa,1983; and the three-volume Part T Crinoidea,1978.

In 1986 Roger L. Kaesler took over the responsibility of editing the Treatise as the new director of the Paleontological Institute. Kaesler oversaw the publication of 11 separate Treatise volumes including the revisions of Part L Ammonoidea, vol. 4, 1996; Part O Trilobita,1997; and Part R Hexapoda, vol. 3&4, 1992. He also initiated the significant five-volume revision of Part E Porifera and six-volume revision of Part H Brachiopoda.

In addition to the publication of hard-bound Treatise volumes, Kaesler also envisioned the creation of PaleoBank, an online, searchable database of data contained within the Treatise. Beginning in 1991, Kaesler envisioned the project as “an extension of the long-standing Treatise on Invertebrate Paleontology,” as well as “a research tool for paleontologists who are not involved in the Treatise project.” This project arose as part of Kaesler’s early recognition of the important role that large data repositories would come to play in the bio- and geo-sciences and represented one of the earliest such community efforts within the field of paleontology.

In 2007 Paul A. Selden took over the directorship of the Paleontological Institute and served as editor of the Treatise until 2020. During his time as editor he oversaw the completion of the five-volume Porifera revision and the six-volume Brachiopoda revision. Over these years the Paleontological Institute also published the revisions of Part L Ammonoidea, vol. 2, 2009 and Part T Chrinoidea, 2011.

A significant change Selden initiated was the creation of the Treatise Online. The Treatise on Invertebrate Paleontology is published on an irregular basis and it can take some time to bring a volume to completion. Historically, once all component articles were completed, the volume was then published as a book in hard-copy format. Now, Treatise Online publishes sections of upcoming Treatise volumes as individual articles when they are ready, rather than waiting for an entire volume to be completed. The last three volumes, Part E Porifera vol. 4&5, 2015, Part B Prokaryota, 2023, and Part V Hemichordata, Second Revision, were all published in this manner. Selden also coordinated and co-edited Part B Prokaryota and Part V Hemichordata. From 2020–2022 William A. Ausich served as Interim Director of the Paleontological Institute and co-edited Part B Prokaryota and Part V Hemichordata, both of which were published in 2023.

The current director and editor is Bruce S. Lieberman (2022–present). A significant change Lieberman initiated was making the Treatise Online and the Treatise on Invertebrate Paleontology open access, which has led to a substantial increase in the number of times the material is downloaded. The Treatise is also now undertaking a number of initiatives to make the data contained within the Treatise more findable, accessible, interopeable, and reusable (FAIR), so the resource will be more widely used by the paleontological community and the general public.

== Layout of the articles ==
From the beginning, the character of the Treatise volumes has followed and further developed the pattern of the classic Invertebrate Paleontology written by Moore, Lalicker and Fischer (1953).

Following their lead, the Treatise includes in a typical article (a) a description of the basic anatomy of the modern members of each invertebrate group, (b) distinctive features of the fossils, (c) a comprehensive illustrated glossary of terms, (d) a short discussion of the evolutionary history of the group, (e) a stratigraphic range chart, done at the level of the major subdivision (lower, middle and upper) of each Geologic period.

This is followed by (f) a listing and technical description of every known genus, along with (g) geographic distribution (usually by continent only, but occasionally by country) and (h) stratigraphic range.

Next come (i) one or two representative species illustrated by line drawings (in the early volumes) or by black-and-white photographs (in subsequent volumes), each accompanied by an appropriate reference for that genus. Furthermore, each Treatise article includes (j) the date, authorship, and scientific history of the taxa.

Finally, there is (k) a comprehensive bibliography and list of references. Not only that, but the more recent volumes and revisions also include (l) new fossil and phylogenetic discoveries, (m) advances in numerical and cladistic methods, (n) analysis of the group's genome, (o) its molecular phylogeny, and so on.

== List of its volumes ==
The following is an annotated list of the volumes already published (1953 to 2007) or volumes currently being prepared:

=== Introduction (A) and sub-metazoan Protista (B, C & D) ===
- Part A. Introduction: Fossilization (Taphonomy), Biogeography, & Biostratigraphy. xxiii + 569 pages, 169 figures, 1979. ISBN 0-8137-3001-5. The original volume is out of print but a pdf is available here.
- Part B. Protoctista / Protista, Volume 1: Charophyta, Sub-volume 1, 2005 available here. ISBN 0-8137-3002-3. ---- Parts B through D refer to mostly one-celled, nucleated forms of life, typically fossilized due to their siliceous tests. "Protista" and Protoctista" are nearly synonymous.
- Part B, Prokaryota (Bacteria and Archaea) xxvi + 178 p., 48 fig., 3 tables, 2023 available here. ISBN 978-0-9903621-4-2.
- Part C. Protista / Protoctista, Volume 2: Sarcodina, Chiefly "Thecamoebians" & Foraminiferida, Sub-volumes 1 and 2, xxxi + 900 p., 653 fig., 1964, available here. ISBN 0-8137-3003-1.
- Part D. Protista / Protoctista, Volume 3: Protozoa (Chiefly Radiolaria & Tintinnina), xii + 195 p., 92 fig., 1954. ISBN 0-8137-3004-X. The original volume is out of print but is available here.

=== Archaeocyatha and Porifera (E) ===
- Part E. Archaeocyatha & Porifera, xviii + 122 p., 89 fig., 1955. ISBN 0-8137-3005-8. The original volume is out-of-print but is available here. ---- Part E refers to sponge-like animals, both calcareous and siliceous.
  - Part E. Revised. Archaeocyatha, Volume 1, xxx + 158 p., 107 fig., 1972, available here. ISBN 0-8137-3105-4.
  - Part E. Revised. Porifera, Volume 2: Introduction to the Porifera, xxvii + 349 p., 135 fig., 10 tables, 2003, available here. ISBN 0-8137-3130-5.
  - Part E. Revised. Porifera, Volume 3: Classes Demospongea, Hexactinellida, Heteractinida & Calcarea, xxxi + 872 p., 506 fig., 1 table, 2004, available here. ISBN 0-8137-3131-3.
  - Part E. Revised. Porifera, Volumes 4 & 5: Hypercalcified Porifera, Paleozoic Stromatoporoidea & Archaeocyatha, liii + 1223 p., 665 figs., 2015, available here. ISBN 978-0-9903621-2-8.

=== Cnidaria or Coelenterata (F) ===
- Part F. Coelenterata / Cnidaria, xvii + 498 p., 358 fig., 1956. ISBN 0-8137-3006-6. The original volume is out-of-print, but is available here. --- Part F refers to the corals and other cnidarians. Coelenterata is an outdated term for two now separated phyla, Cnidaria and Ctenophora (comb jellies).
  - Part F. Coelenterata / Cnidaria, Supplement 1 & 2: Rugosa & Tabulata corals, xl + 762 p., 462 fig., 1981, available here. ISBN 0-8137-3029-5.
  - (Part F, Revised, vol. 2, Cnidaria (Scleractinia) - volume in preparation).

=== Bryozoa (G) ===
- Part G. Bryozoa, xii + 253 p., 175 fig., 1953. ISBN 0-8137-3007-4. The original volume is out-of-print, but is available here. --- Part G refers to bryozoans, colonial animals also known as ectoprocts or moss animals.
  - Part G. Revised. Bryozoa, Volume 1: Introduction, Order Cystoporata & Order Cryptostomata, xxvi + 625 p., 295 fig., 1983, available here. ISBN 0-8137-3107-0.
  - (Part G, Revised, vol. 2, Bryozoa - volume in preparation).

=== Brachiopoda (H) ===
- Part H. Brachiopoda, vol. 1 & 2, xxxii + 927 p., 746 fig., 1965. ISBN 0-8137-3008-2. The original volume is out-of-print, but is available here. --- Part H refers to brachiopods, shelled animals including living lamp shells.
  - Part H. Revised. Brachiopoda, Volume 1: Introduction, xx + 539 p., 417 fig., 40 tables, 1997, available here. ISBN 0-8137-3108-9.
  - Part H. Revised. Brachiopoda, Volumes 2 and 3: Sub-phyla Linguliformea, Craniiformea, & Rhynchonelliformea (1st part: Classes Chileta, Obolellata, Kutorginata, Strophomenata & Rhynchonellata), xxx + 919 p., 616 fig., 17 tables, 2000, available here. ISBN 0-8137-3108-9.
  - Part H. Revised. Brachiopoda, Volume 4: Sub-phylum Rhynchonelliformea (2nd part: Orders Pentamerida, Rhynchonellida, Atrypida & Athrydida), ix + 768 pp., 484 fig., 3 tables, 2002 / 2005, available here. ISBN 0-8137-3108-9.
  - Part H. Revised. Brachiopoda, Volume 5: Sub-phylum Rhynchonelliformea (3rd part: Orders Spiriferida, Spiriferinida, Thecideida, Terebratulida & Uncertain), xlvi + 631 pp., 398 fig., 2006, available here. ISBN 0-8137-3135-6.
  - Part H. Revised. Brachiopoda, Volume 6: Supplement, l + 956 pages, 461 figures (10 in color), 38 tables, 2007, available here. ISBN 978-0-8137-3136-0.

=== Mollusca (I, J, K, L, M & N) ===
- Part I. Mollusca 1: Mollusca General Features, Scaphopoda, Amphineura, Monoplacophora, Gastropoda General Features, Archaeogastropoda, Mainly Paleozoic Caenogastropoda and Opisthobranchia), xxiii + 351 p., 216 fig., 1960. ISBN 0-8137-3009-0. The original volume is out-of-print, but is available here. --- Parts I and J refer to primitive mollusks and gastropods (such as snails).
- (Part J, Mollusca 2: Paleozoic Gastropoda --- volume in preparation).
- Part K. Mollusca 3: Cephalopoda General Features, Endoceratoidea, Actinoceratoidea, Nautiloidea, & Bactritoidea, xxviii + 519 p., 361 fig., 1964. ISBN 0-8137-3011-2. The original volume is out of print, but is available here. --- Parts K and L refer to cephalopods with external shells, including ammonites and Nautilus-like creatures.
  - (Part K, Revised. Mollusca 3: Nautiloidea --- volume in preparation).
- Part L. Mollusca 4: Ammonoidea, xxii + 490 p., 558 fig., 1957. ISBN 0-8137-3012-0. The original volume is out-of-print, but is available here.
  - Part L. Revised. Mollusca 4, Volume 2: Carboniferous and Permian Ammonoidea (Goniatitida and Prolecanitida), xxix + 258 p., 139 fig., 1 table, 2009, available here. ISBN 978-1-891276-61-3.
  - Part L. Revised. Mollusca 4, Volume 4: Cretaceous Ammonoidea, xx + 362 p., 216 fig., 1995 / 1996, available here. ISBN 0-8137-3112-7.
  - (Part L, Revised. Mollusca 4, vol. 3B, Triassic and Jurassic Ammonoidea --- volume in preparation).
- (Part M. Mollusca 5: Coleoidea --- volume in preparation. --- Part M includes coleoids (cephalopods without external shells) such as squids, cuttlefish, and extinct belemnoids).
- Part N. Mollusca 6: Bivalvia, Volumes 1 and 2 (of 3), xxxvii + 952 p., 613 fig., 1969. ISBN 0-8137-3014-7. The original volume is out of print, but is available here. --- Part N refers to clams, oysters, scallops, mussels and other fossilized bivalves or pelecypods.
- Part N. Mollusca 6: Bivalvia, Volume 3: Oysters, iv + 272 p., 153 fig., 1971, available here. ISBN 0-8137-3026-0.
  - (Part N, Revised, Mollusca 6, vol. 1, Bivalvia—volume in preparation).

=== Arthropoda (O, P, Q & R) ===
- Part O. Arthropoda 1: Arthropoda General Features, Protarthropoda, Euarthropoda General Features, Trilobitomorpha, xix + 560 p., 415 fig., 1959. ISBN 0-8137-3015-5. The original volume is out-of-print, but is available here. --- Part O refers to stem-arthropods including velvet worms (Onychophora), water bears (Tardigrada), and trilobites.
  - Part O. Revised. Arthropoda 1, Volume 1: Trilobita: Introduction, Order Agnostida & Order Redlichiida, xxiv + 530 p., 309 fig., 1997, available here. ISBN 0-8137-3115-1.
  - (Part O, Revised. Arthropoda 1: Trilobita --- additional volumes in preparation).
- Part P. Arthropoda 2: Chelicerata, Pycnogonida & Palaeoisopus, xvii + 181 p., 123 fig., 1955 / 1956, available here. ISBN 0-8137-3016-3. --- Part P refers to extinct chelicerates including eurypterids (sea scorpions), xiphosurans (horseshoe crabs), pycnogonids (sea spiders), and arachnids.
  - (Part P (Revised), Arthropoda 2, vol. 1, Chelicerata—volume in preparation).
- Part Q. Arthropoda 3: Crustacea & Ostracoda, xxiii + 442 p., 334 fig., 1961, available here. ISBN 0-8137-3017-1. --- Parts Q and R refer to crustaceans such as crabs, lobsters, and ostracods, as well as myriapods (millipedes and centipedes), and hexapods (such as insects).
  - (Part Q, Revised. Arthropoda 3 --- in preparation).
- Part R. Arthropoda 4, Volumes 1 and 2: Crustacea (exclusive of Ostracoda), Myriapoda, & Hexapoda, xxxvi + 651 p., 397 fig., 1969. ISBN 0-8137-3018-X. The original volume is out-of-print, but is available here.
- Part R. Arthropoda 4, Volumes 3 and 4: Hexapoda, xxii + 655 p., 265 fig., 1992. ISBN 0-8137-3019-8. The original volume is out-of-print, but is available here.
  - Part R, Revised, Arthropoda 4, vol. 1, Crustacea—volume in preparation).

=== Echinodermata (S, T & U) ===
- Part S. Echinodermata 1, Volumes 1 and 2: Echinodermata General Features, Homalozoa, Crinozoa (exclusive of Crinoidea), xxx + 650 p., 400 fig., 1967 / 1968. ISBN 0-8137-3020-1. The original volume is out-of-print, but is available here. ---- Part S refers to primitive sessile echinoderms.
- Part T. Echinodermata 2, Volumes 1-3: Crinoidea, xxxviii + 1,027 p., 619 fig., 1978. ISBN 0-8137-3021-X. The original volume is out-of-print, but is available here. ---- Part T refers to crinoids, a group of echinoderms including living sea lilies.
  - Part T. Revised. Echinodermata 2, Volume 3: Crinoidea, xxix + 261 p., 112 fig., 2011, and is available here. ISBN 978-0-9833599-1-3.
  - (Part T, Revised, Echinodermata 2, vol. 1, Crinoidea—volume in preparation).
- Part U. Echinodermata 3, Volumes 1 and 2: Asterozoans & Echinozoans, xxx + 695 p., 534 fig., 1966, and is available here. ISBN 0-8137-3022-8. ---- Part U refers to asterozoans (including sea stars and brittle stars) and echinozoans (including sea urchins and sea cucumbers).

=== Graptolithina (V) ===
- Part V. Graptolithina, with sections on Enteropneusta & Pterobranchia, xvii + 101 p., 72 fig., 1955. ISBN 0-8137-3023-6. The original volume is out-of-print, but is available here. --- Part V refers to the extinct graptolites, as well as to other hemichordates.
  - Part V. Revised. Graptolithina, xxxii + 163 p., 109 fig., 1970, available here.
  - Part V. Second Revision. Hemichordata (Graptolithina) xxx + 548 p., 310 fig., 2023 available here. ISBN 978-0-9903621-3-5.

=== Miscellanea and Conodonta (W) ===
- Part W. Miscellanea: Conodonts, Conoidal shells of uncertain affinities, Worms, Trace Fossils, & problematica, xxv + 259 p., 153 fig., 1962, and is available here. ISBN 0-8137-3024-4. --- Miscellaneous invertebrate fossils, including trace fossils and conodonts, which may be primitive vertebrates.
  - Part W. Revised. Miscellanea: Trace Fossils and problematica, xxi + 269 p., 110 fig., 1975. The original volume is out-of-print, but is available here. ISBN 0-8137-3027-9.
  - Part W. Miscellanea, Supplement 2: Conodonta, xxviii + 202 p., frontis., 122 fig., 1981, available here. ISBN 0-8137-3028-7.
