= Eodictyonella =

Eodictyonella Temporal range: Late Ordovician

Scientific classification
- Domain: Eukaryota
- Kingdom: Animalia
- Phylum: Brachiopoda
- Class: †Chileata
- Order: †Dictyonellida
- Family: †Eichwaldiidae
- Genus: †Eodictyonella

Synonyms
- Dictyonella Hall 1868

Extinct genus of brachiopods

Eodictyonella is a genus of rhynchonelliform brachiopods belonging to the extinct class Chileata. It is characterised by a non-strophic shell covered by a net-like ornament (Greek dictyon, a net). Like in most chileates, the perforation in the umbonal region of the ventral valve is covered by a colleplax. Eodictyonella is known from the Ordovician to the Lower Devonian.

It had initially been described as Dictyonella Hall, 1868; however, this name proved to be a younger homonym of Dictyonella Schmidt, 1868, a sponge, so has been replaced by Eodictyonella Wright, 1994.

Eodictyonella belongs to the family Eichwaldiidae Schuchert, 1893 and to the order Dictyonellida Cooper, 1956. The latter is based on Eodictyonella under its former name. However, Dictyonellidae is a family of sponges.

Isogramma belongs to the same order, but its external aspect is rather different from Eodictyonella; Isogramma has a strophic shell.
