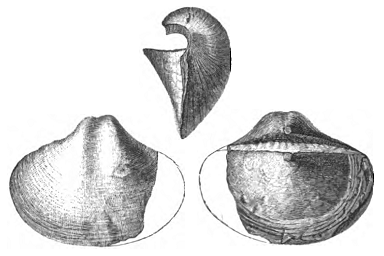
- Kutorgina cingulata, a kutorginid from the lower Cambrian of Canada. Seen looking onto the ventral valve (left), dorsal valve (right), and the side (top)

Scientific classification
- Domain: Eukaryota
- Kingdom: Animalia
- Phylum: Brachiopoda
- Class: †Kutorginata; Williams et al., 1996
- Order: †Kutorginida; Kuhn, 1949

Subgroups
- See text.

= Kutorginata =

Kutorginata Temporal range: Cambrian Series 2– Miaolingian (Atdabanian–Amgaian)

Extinct genus of shelled animals

Kutorginates (Kutorginata) are an extinct class of early rhynchonelliform ("articulate") brachiopods. The class contains only a single order, Kutorginida (kutorginides). Kutorginides were among the earliest rhynchonelliforms, restricted to the lower-middle part of the Cambrian Period ("Atdabanian" [stage 3] to "Mayan" [late Miaolingian]).

Despite this short span of time, kutorginides were still a major order of Cambrian rhynchonelliforms during the lower Cambrian. Kutorginide diversity was highest up to the "Toyonian", though they began to decline in the mid-Cambrian even as other brachiopod orders (particularly orthides and acrotretides) diversified. A similar pattern of diversity loss is seen in obollelides, naukatides, and chileides, three other early rhynchonelliform orders contemporary with kutorginides.

== Anatomy ==
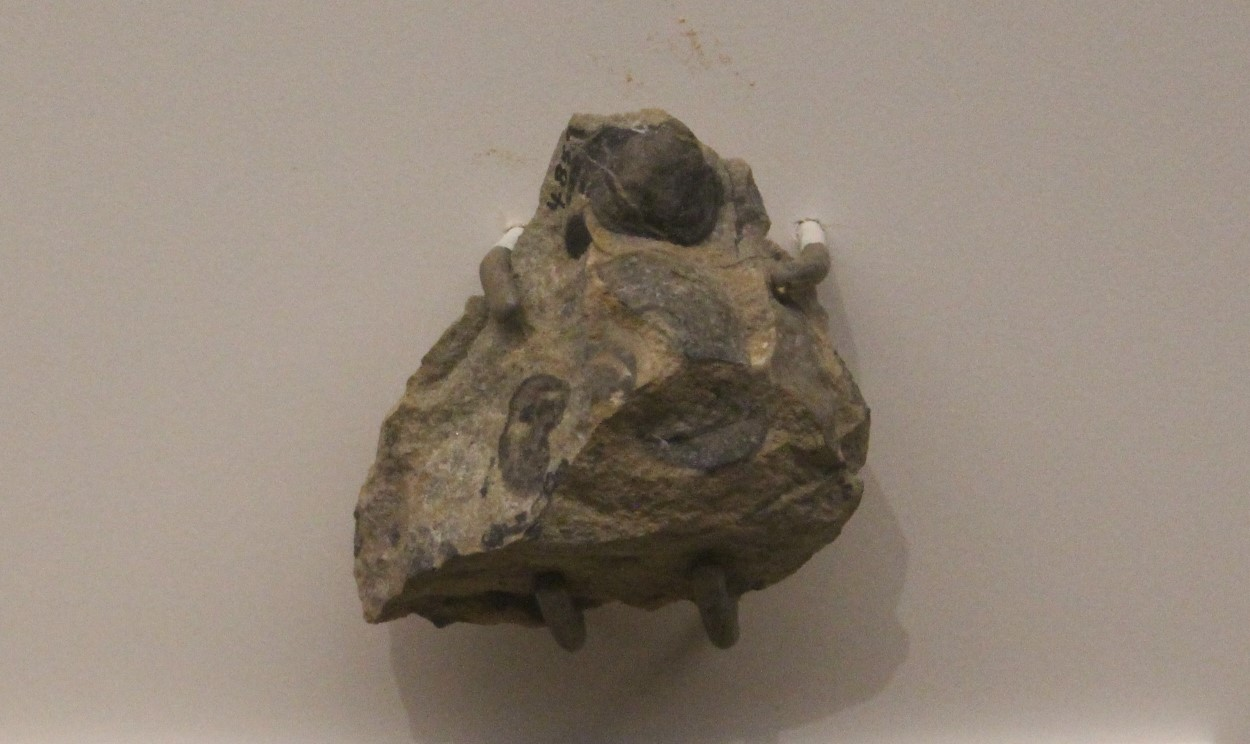
Fossil specimen, University of Michigan Museum of Natural History

Kutorginides typically have a ventribiconvex shell (both valves convex, the ventral valve moreso) and a strophic (straight) hinge line. Based on fossils of Nisusia, the shell’s internal (secondary) layer appears to have a microstructure of calcite fibers.

Internally, the valves are simpler than most other rhynchonelliforms. Though kutorginides are technically articulate, the hinge is not braced by teeth and sockets, but rather a system of thin ridges and deep furrows along the hinge line. Likewise, cardinalia and dental plates are absent, with only a few subtle muscle scars in their place. The only other apparent structures are the mantle canals, which are pinnate in form (radiating, apart from the midline canals).

=== Posterior structures ===
The rear of the shell has a roughly kite- to diamond-shaped profile. The pseudodeltidium is voluminous, covering most of the delthyrium (ventral indentation) and taking up a large portion of the ventral valve from the rear. Conversely, the chilidium is rather low and undeveloped, leaving a large exposed notothyrium (dorsal indentation). A small pedicle foramen lies at the apex of the pseudodeltidium.

Kutorginides also have another much larger and more enigmatic opening at the middle of the hinge line. This opening corresponds to the space encompassed by the notothyrium and the exposed portion of the delthyrium. The soft-tissue relevance of this opening has been a subject of debate, and recent evidence has argued for a more nuanced interpretation with variation within the class.

Several kutorginides are preserved in lagerstätten, elaborating on the structure and location of the pedicle relative to the two posterior openings. Kutorgina chengjiangensis, from the Chengjiang Lagerstätte of China, has a pedicle in the form of a thick annulated stalk. Despite its thickness, the pedicle is joined to the shell at the pseudodeltidium, strongly suggesting that it was originally derived from within the small pedicle foramen. The large posterior opening probably helped support strong diductor muscles in this interpretation.

Several fossils of Nisusia sulcata, from the Marjum Limestone of Utah, tell a different story. Each fossil includes a distinctive silicified tube within the large posterior opening. This tube has long been interpreted as a coprolite, suggesting that kutorginides had a complete gut terminating at a gap in the rear of the shell. This condition is otherwise unknown in articulate brachiopods, and is more akin to inarticulates in the subphylum Craniiformea. However, modern brachiopods have very small fecal pellets, so the silicified tube may be better interpreted as an adult pedicle. The smaller foramen at the tip of the pseudodeltidium may be a remnant of a larval pedicle, later rendered redundant by a second pedicle developing at the hinge in adulthood. In this scenario, the pedicle of other rhynchonelliforms would be homologous to the larval pedicle of Nisusia sulcata.

== Subgroups ==
From The Treatise on Invertebrate Paleontology (Part H, Revised), unless stated otherwise:

- Order Kutorginida
  - Superfamily Kutorginoidea
    - Family Kutorginidae
      - Agyrekia Koneva 1979 [lower-mid Cambrian ("Botomian" – "Amgan")]
      - Haupiria MacKinnon, 1983 [mid-Cambrian]
      - Kutorgina Billings, 1861 [lower-mid Cambrian ("Atdabanian" – "Amgan")]
      - Schuchertina Walcott, 1905 [mid-Cambrian]
      - Yorkia Walcott, 1897 [lower Cambrian]
  - Superfamily Nisusioidea
    - Family Nisusiidae
      - Bellistrophia Holmer et al., 2019 [mid-Cambrian (Wuliuan)]
      - Eoconcha Cooper, 1951 [lower-mid Cambrian]
      - Khasagtina? Ushatinskaya, 1987 [lower Cambrian ("Tommotian"? – "Atdabanian")]
      - Narynella Andreeva, 1987 [lower Cambrian ("Toyonian") – mid-Cambrian]
      - Nisusia Walcott, 1905 [lower Cambrian ("Botomian") – mid-Cambrian]
      - Trematosia Cooper, 1967 [lower Cambrian]
  - Incertae sedis genera:
    - Anomalocalyx Brock, 1999 [mid-Cambrian (Drumian)]

== Representative genera ==
=== Kutorgina ===
Some species of Kutorgina have a concavo-convex shell, with the smaller brachial (dorsal) valve dished in and the larger pedicle (ventral) valve broadly arched. The brachial valve has a rather prominent interarea at the back which is curved over by the prominent beak at the back of the pedicle valve.

It includes the species Kutorgina elanica Malakhovskaya, 2013 and K. chengjiangensis Zhang et al. 2007, among many others. K. chengjiangensis preserves soft anatomy, including a pedicle, lophophore, and gut.

=== Nisusia ===
Nisusia Walcott, 1905 (Walcott, 1889) is known from the Miaolingian-age Burgess Shale (~508 million years ago). It is a senior synonym to Orthisina alberta Walcott, 1889.

The pedicle of Nisusia emerges from between its valves, as displayed by silicified material of N. sulcata, though it still has an opening at the apex of the pedicle valve.
