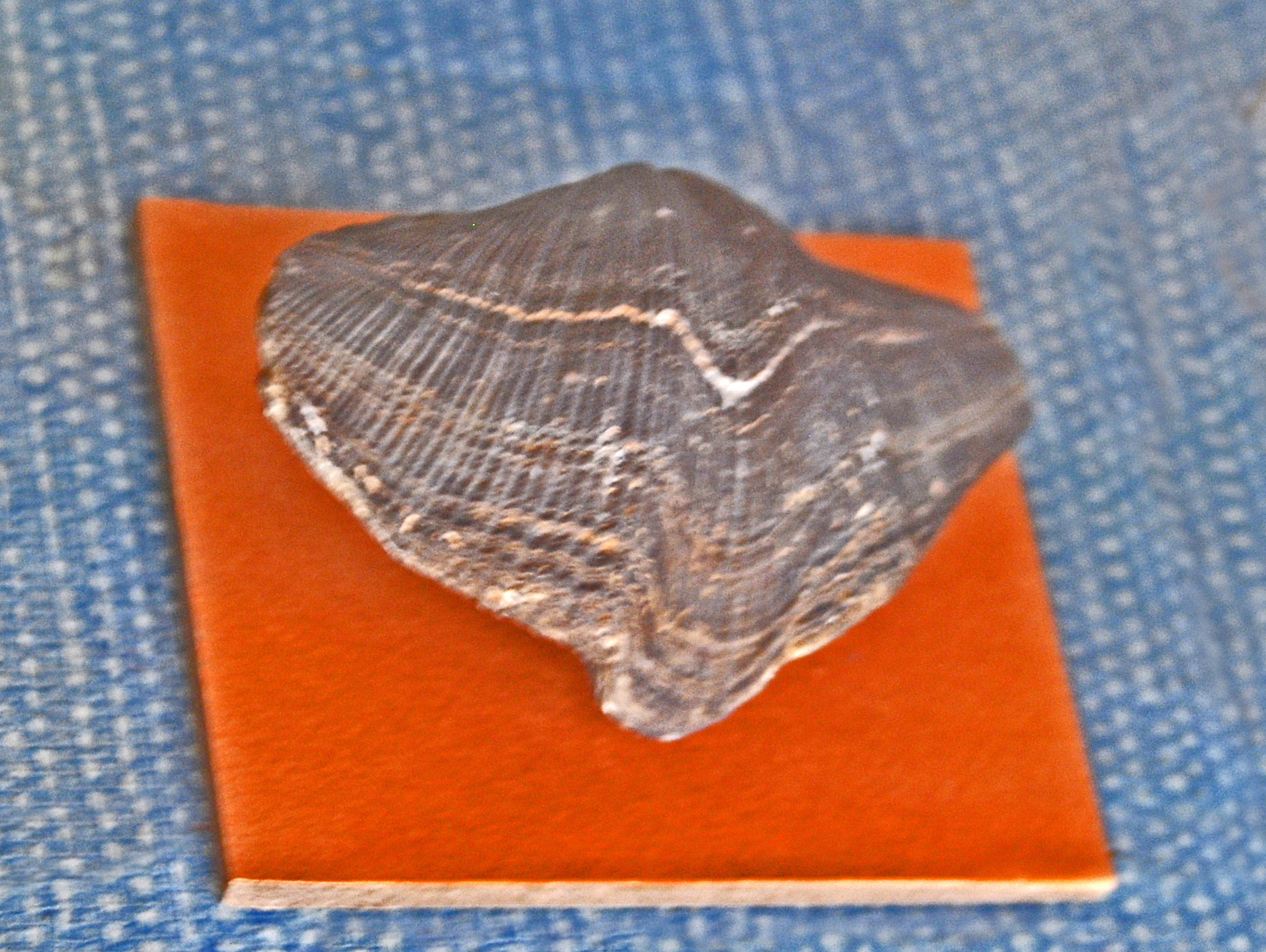
- Fossil of Gypospirifer condor from Bolivia, on display at Galerie de paléontologie et d'anatomie comparée in Paris

Scientific classification
- Domain: Eukaryota
- Kingdom: Animalia
- Phylum: Brachiopoda
- Class: Rhynchonellata
- Order: †Spiriferida
- Family: †Trigonotretidae
- Genus: †Gypospirifer
- Species: †G. condor

Binomial name
- †Gypospirifer condor d'Orbigny 1842

= Gypospirifer condor =

Gypospirifer condor Temporal range: Carboniferous–Permian

Species of fossil brachiopod

Gypospirifer condor is an extinct species of articulate brachiopod fossils belonging to the family Trigonotretidae. They were stationary epifaunal suspension feeders.

Fossils of this species have been found in the sediments of the Carboniferous and Permian ages (from 298.9 to 279.5 million years ago).
