= Cymbidium (disambiguation) =

Cymbidium may refer to:

- Cymbidium, the boat orchids, a plant genus in the family Orchidaceae
- Cymbidium (brachiopod), a Silurian brachiopod genus
