= Crurithyris =

Crurithyris Temporal range: Devonian-Permian ~403–251 Ma

Scientific classification
- Kingdom: Animalia
- Phylum: Brachiopoda
- Class: Rhynchonellata
- Order: †Spiriferida
- Family: †Ambocoeliidae
- Subfamily: †Ambocoeliinae
- Genus: †Crurithyris; George, 1931

Species
- See text

Extinct genus of brachiopod

Crurithyris is an extinct genus of brachiopod belonging to the order Spiriferida and family Ambocoeliidae.

== Species ==
- C. aquilonia Stehli and Grant, 1971
- C. arcuata Girty, 1910
- C. calendae Johnson 1971
- C. clannyana King 1848
- C. expansa Dunbar and Condra, 1932
- C. extumida Jin and Ye, 1979
- C. inflata Schnur, 1853
- C. longa Liao, 1980
- C. longirostris Cooper and Grant, 1976
- C. longtanica Jin and Hu, 1978
- C. major Cooper and Grant, 1976
- C. muliensis Xu, 1978
- C. opalinus Termier and Termier, 1977
- C. parva Weller 1899
- C. planoconvexa Shumard, 1855
- C. sulcata Stehli, 1954
- C. telleri Schellwien, 1900
- C. tianshengqiaoensis Feng, 1978
- C. uralica Stepanov and Kalashnikov, 1998
- C. urei Fleming, 1828
- C. wampensis Mills and Langenheim Jr., 1987
