= Coolinia =

Coolinia Temporal range: Ordovician–Silurian

Scientific classification
- Kingdom: Animalia
- Phylum: Brachiopoda
- Class: †Strophomenata
- Order: †Orthotetida
- Family: †Chilidiopsidae
- Genus: †Coolinia; Bancroft, 1949

Type species
- Orthis applanata Salter, 1846

Other species
- Coolinia convexa Savage, 1913; Coolinia dalmani Bergström, 1968; Coolinia gamachiana Twenhofel, 1928; Coolinia gracilis Andreeva, 1961; Coolinia pecten Linnaeus, 1758; Coolinia sulcata Boucot et al., 1988

Extinct genus of orthotetide brachiopod

Coolinia is an extinct genus of orthotetide brachiopod that lived during the Ordovician and Silurian periods.

== Description ==
Coolinia lacked a pedicle sheath during its larval stage. Its larval shell did possess a primitive colleplax structure, however.
