= Ali Sina =

Ali Sina may refer to:

== People ==
- Abu Ali Sina (980–1037), Persian philosopher, physician, scientist and poet
- Ali Sina (activist), Iranian-born Canadian ex-Muslim activist and critic of Islam
- Ali Sina Rabbani (born 1993), Iranian football midfielder

== Other uses ==
- Bu-Ali Sina University, in Hamedan, Iran
- Alisina, a genus of brachiopod

== See also ==
- Alysina, a genus of moth
