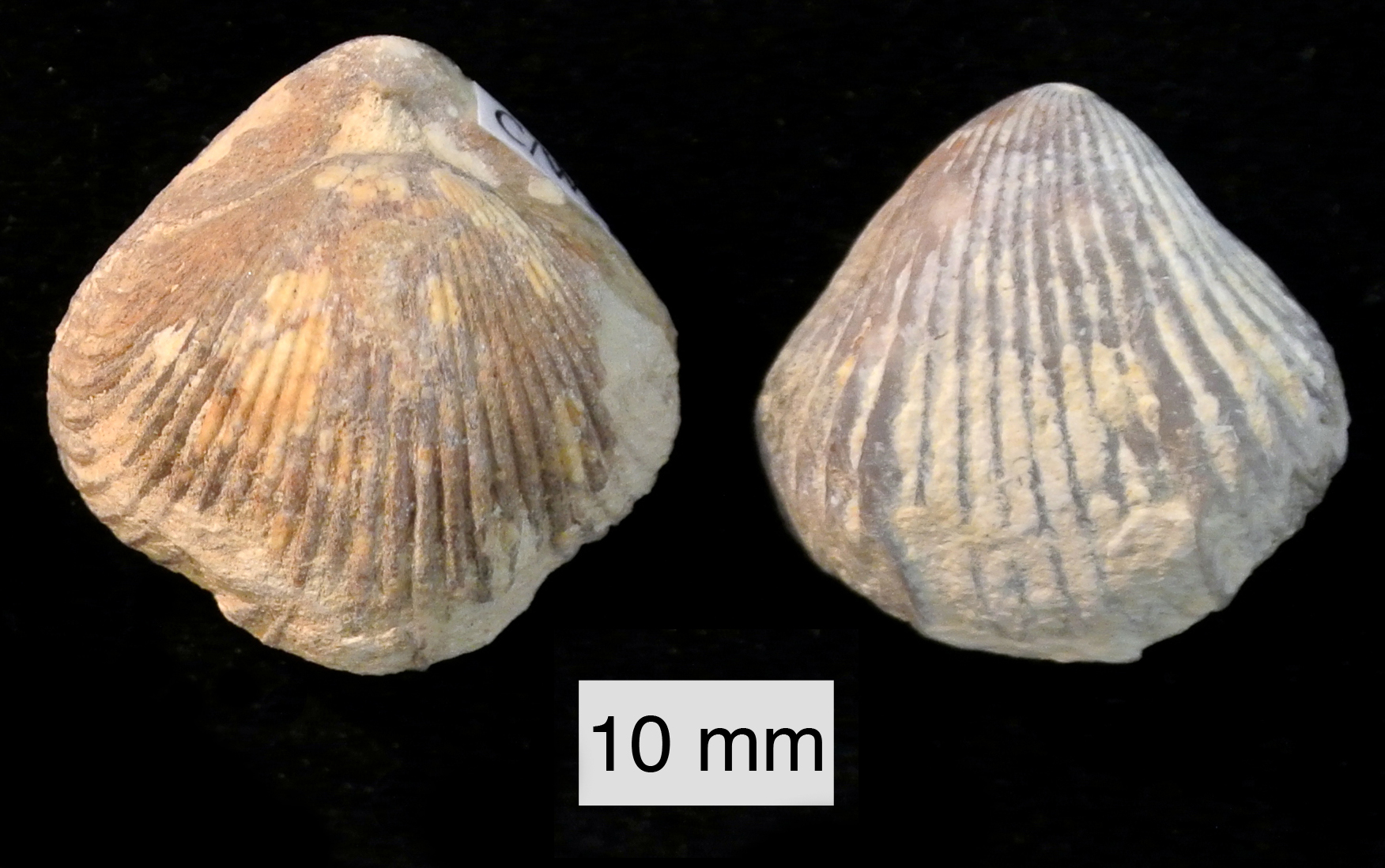
- Burmirhynchia jirbaensis, a rhynchonellide from the Jurassic of Israel

Scientific classification
- Kingdom: Animalia
- Phylum: Brachiopoda
- Subphylum: Rhynchonelliformea; Williams, Carlson, Brunton, Holmer & Popov, 1996

Classes
- †Chileata; †Kutorginata; †Obolellata; †Strophomenata; Rhynchonellata

= Rhynchonelliformea =

Rhynchonelliformea Temporal range: 530–0 Ma Lower Cambrian to Recent

Subphylum of brachiopods

Rhynchonelliformea is a major subphylum and clade of brachiopods. It is roughly equivalent to the former class Articulata, which was used previously in brachiopod taxonomy up until the 1990s. These so-called articulated brachiopods have many anatomical differences relative to "inarticulate" brachiopods of the subphyla Linguliformea and Craniformea. Articulates have hard calcium carbonate shells with tongue-and-groove hinge articulations (hence the name) and separate sets of simple opening and closing muscles.

The Rhynchonelliformea (as described in the Treatise Part H, revised 1997–2007) is divided into five classes: Obolellata, Kutorginata, Chileata, Strophomenata, and Rhynchonellata. The Rhynchonellata are found living today, as the major constituent of modern brachiopod faunas. The other classes are all extinct: the Obolellata and Kutorginata are restricted to the Cambrian, while the Chileata and Strophomenata range through most of the Paleozoic.

== Anatomy ==
Like all brachiopods, rhynchonelliforms have a shell with two stacked components (valves): a ventral (pedicle) valve which hosts the fleshy pedicle, and a dorsal (brachial) valve which acts as a platform for the lophophore and other important organs.

=== Shell composition ===
Rhynchonelliform shells are composed of low-magnesium calcium carbonate fragments stabilized by proteins and other organic molecules. The shell has several major layers. The thicker but less dense inner (secondary) mineralized layer is secreted from below by the mantle. In living rhynchonelliforms, the secondary layer is a mesh of calcite fibers, but extinct groups were more variable in structure. The thinner but denser outer (primary) mineralized layer is composed of calcite grains. It was emplaced from above by the periostracum, a protein-rich outer organic sheath.

=== Hinge and dental structures ===
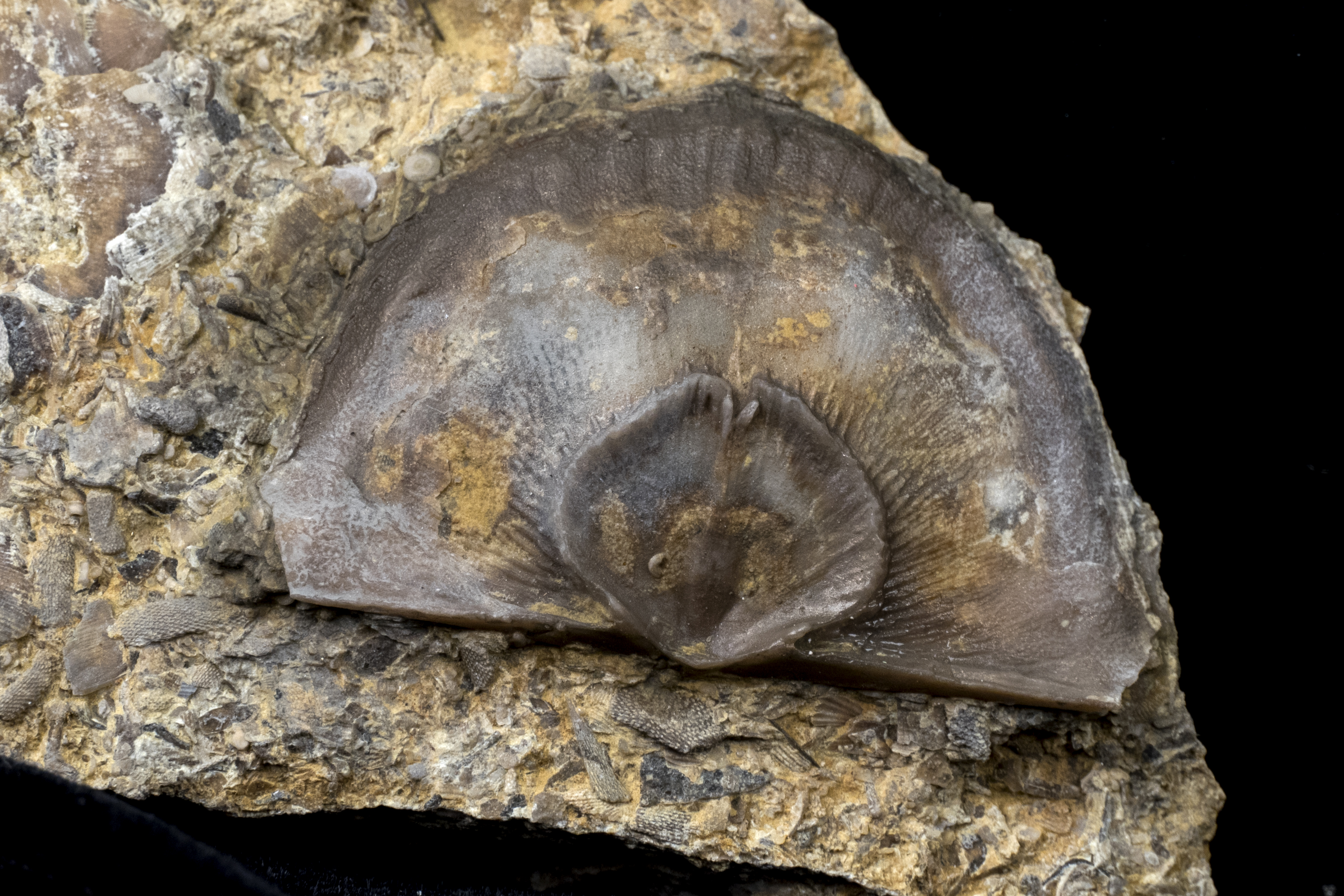
Strophomena filitexta, a strophomenide from the Ordovician of Minnesota. Ventral valve seen from the inside, illustrating strongly-developed dental plates leading to low teeth near the hinge line.

The two valves meet at a mobile hinge at the back of the body. In nearly all rhynchonelliforms, this hinge is strengthened by a pair of teeth on the ventral valve, fitting into a pair of sockets on the dorsal valve. This tooth-and-socket articulation is responsible for rhynchonelliforms' alternative name as articulated brachiopods. Tooth shapes typically range from deltidiodont (simple and knob-like) to cyrtomatodont (hooked) or transverse (wider than long).

The teeth may be supported by a variety of specialized structures. The most common of these are dental plates, thin crests extending forwards along the inner surface of the ventral valve. The dental plates also act as attachment points for the brachiopod's diductor muscles. In some rhynchonelliforms, the dental plates are enlarged to the point that they converge into a bowl-shaped structure known as a spondylium.

=== Cardinalia ===
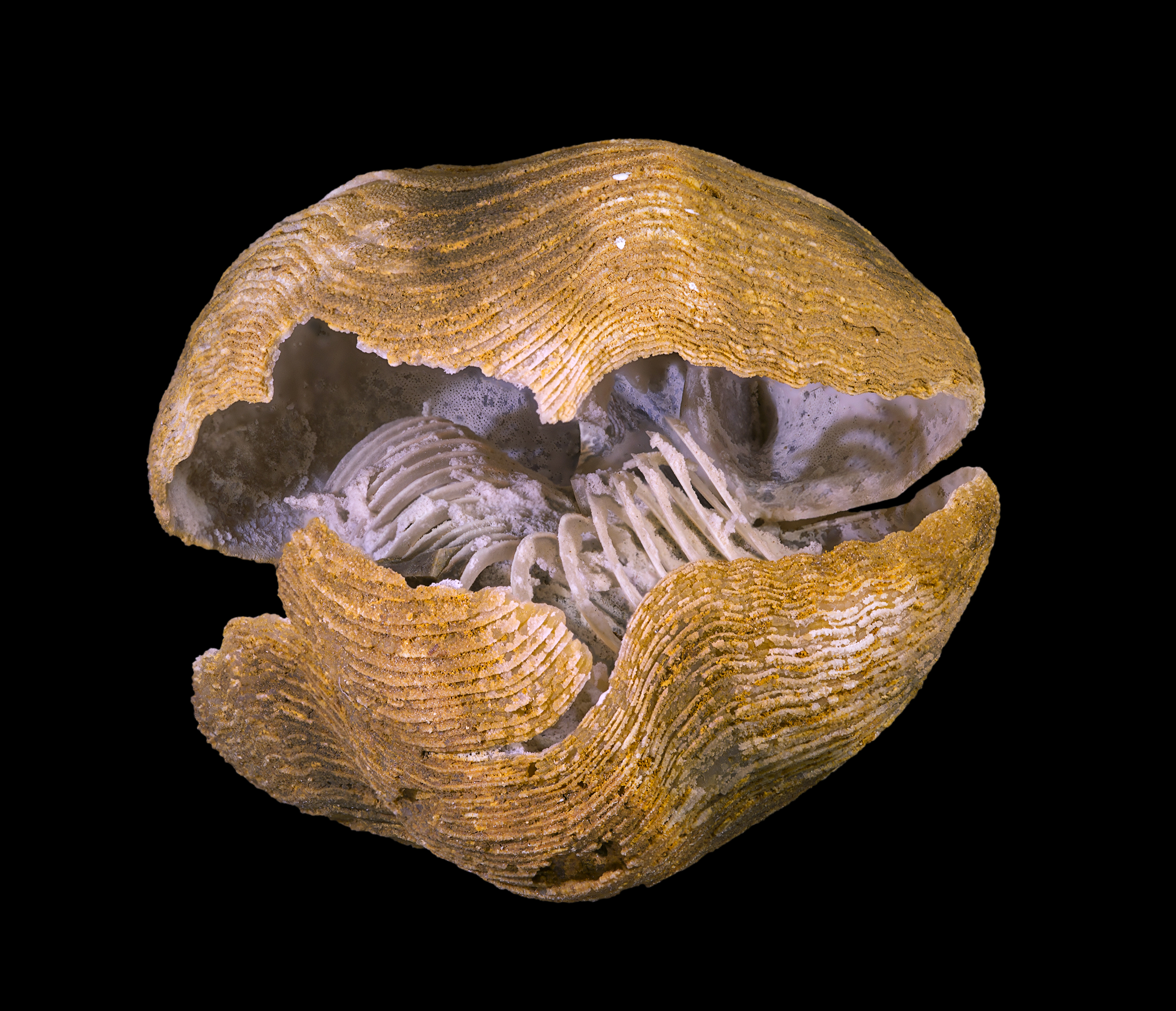
Liospiriferina rostrata, a spiriferinide from the Jurassic of France. Spiraling brachidia, among the most elaborate of cardinalia, are visible inside the shell.

Internally, the rear part of the dorsal valve is complex, bearing a variety of calcified structures originating near the hinge line. These structures, termed cardinalia, come in many varieties with crest-like, plate-like, or prong-like shapes. Cardinal processes host muscle attachments, clustering near the hinge line or projecting along the midline of the valve. In early articulates, brachiophores (also called crural bases) develop near the front rim of each tooth socket. In more recent species, the brachiophores extend into paired crura (singular: crus), which diverge away from the midline and reinforce the base of the lophophore. In some rhynchonelliform groups, the crura develop further into brachidia (singular: brachidium), looping or spiraling strands which support the entire length of the lophophore.

=== External structures ===
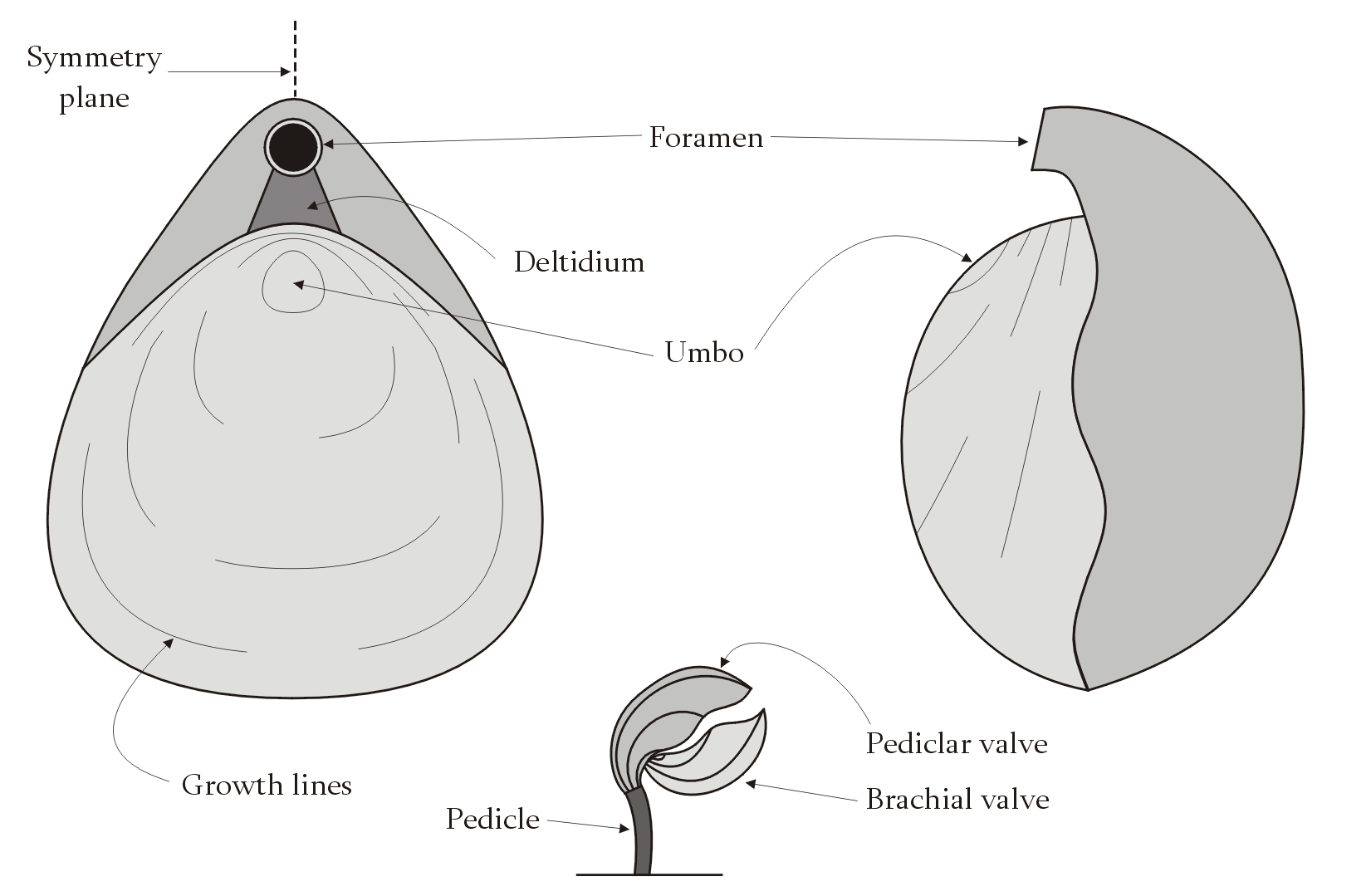
A simplified diagram showing major features of rhynchonelliform brachiopods

In general, rhynchonelliforms have mixoperipheral growth: through the shell's development, the commissure (rim) of the shell expands forwards and outwards, away from the hinge. In addition, the valves converge towards each other, creating a curved valve profile tapering to a pointed umbo ("beak") overlooking the hinge. When seen from behind, each valve may bear a triangular depression (interarea) in the space between the umbo and the hinge line.

In many cases, a conspicuous gap or indentation carves out the middle of each interarea from the hinge line towards the umbo. This indentation is known as a delthyrium (on the ventral interarea) or a notothyrium (on the dorsal interarea). The hole for the pedicle, when present, takes up a portion of the delthyrium. Despite their ubiquity, the delthyrium and notothyrium are not always fully visible. Many brachiopods cover up the gaps with calcite plates secreted by the mantle between the hinge and pedicle. The ventral plate may be termed the deltidium or symphytium (if derived from the sides of the delthyrium) or pseudodeltidium (if derived from the vicinity of the pedicle). The dorsal plate, positioned at the apex of the notothyrium, is known as a chilidium.

=== Soft tissue ===
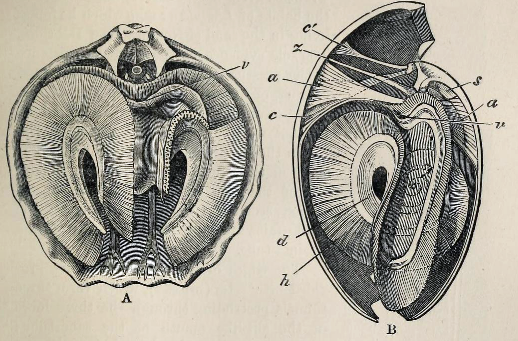
Cross-section views of Magellania flavescens, a modern terebratulide

Rhynchonelliforms are filter-feeders with a lophophore: curled feeding tentacles with a double row of hair-like cilia. The body cavity is small, encased within the rear part of the shell. At least in living species, the gut is incomplete, with a small mouth but no anus. The shell can be closed by a pair of adductor muscles, which project vertically and split dorsally to form four muscle scars immediately in front of the cardinalia. Likewise, the shell is opened by two pairs of diductor muscles, a lever-like system broadening from the cardinal processes to the central-rear part of the ventral valve.

The pedicle, when present, is stout and solid, filled in by connective tissue. Two pairs of adjustor muscles control the base of the pedicle, bridging the gap between the delthyrium of the ventral valve and the cardinalia of the dorsal valve. Apart from muscles and the body cavity, rhynchonelliforms have a system of radiating canals which provide nutrients to the mantle lobes underlying each valve. Mantle canals are labelled according to their point of origin: vascula media originate from the midline of the shell, vascula myaria from the sides of muscle attachment points, and vascula genitalia from the rear part of the shell, helping to sustain a large pair of gonad pouches.

== History of classification ==
The name Rhynchonelliformea is a replacement for Articulata, a name which is also in use for a living subclass of crinoids. Rhynchonelliformea references the family Rhynchonellidae, though rhynchonellides are no more representative of articulate brachiopods than any other group such as spiriferides or strophomenides.

=== Treatise (1965) ===
In the older classification of the Treatise on Invertebrate Paleontology Part H (1965), the Class Articulata was divided into six orders: Orthida, Pentamerida, Rhynchonellida, Spiriferida, Terebratulida, and Strophomenida.

=== Revised Treatise (1997–2007) ===
The revised edition of the Treatise on Invertebrate Paleontology divided "articulates" into five classes. The orders Orthida, Pentamerida, Rhynchonellida, Spiriferida, and Terebratulida became combined as the class Rhynchonellata. The former Strophomenida was raised to the class Strophomenata and divided into four orders. Chileata were removed from the strophomenides and given their own class. Obolellata and Kutorginata were previously included among the inarticulate brachiopods, but have subsequently been recognized as classes of primitive articulates.

One of the more significant changes in the new classification is the splitting of the original Spiriferida into four distinct and separate orders, the Spiriferida as revised, Atrypida, Athyridida, and Spiriferinida; each with its own derivation and phylogeny. Originally these were included as suborders within the Spiriferida, a group which combined brachiopods with spiral (coiled spring-like) brachidia regardless of the orientation or the length of the hinge line or whether the shell was impunctate or punctate. The newer classification recognizes that spiral brachidia are a case of convergent evolution. In the older classification scheme of R.C, Moore (in Moore, Lalicker, and Fischer, 1952), the Athyridida was equivalent to the suborder Rostropiracea and the Spiriferinida was equivalent to the suborder Punctospiracea.

== Subgroups ==
- Class †Chileata
  - Order †Chileida [lower Cambrian ("Botomian") – mid-Silurian (Wenlock)]
  - Order †Dictyonellida [Upper Ordovician – Lower Permian (Artinskian)]
- Class †Kutorginata
  - Order †Kutorginida [lower-mid Cambrian]
- Class †Obolellata
  - Order †Naukatida [lower-mid Cambrian]
  - Order †Obolellida [lower-mid Cambrian]
- Class †Strophomenata
  - Order †Billingsellida [mid-Cambrian – Upper Ordovician (Hirnantian)]
  - Order †Orthotetida [Lower–Middle Ordovician ("Llanvirn") – Upper Permian]
  - Order †Productida [Upper Ordovician – Lower Triassic (Induan)]
  - Order †Strophomenida [Lower Ordovician (Tremadocian) – Carboniferous (Serpukhovian)]
- Class Rhynchonellata
  - Order †Athyridida [Upper Ordovician – Lower Jurassic]
  - Order †Atrypida [Lower-Middle Ordovician ("Llanvirn") – Upper Devonian (Frasnian)]
  - Order †Orthida [lower-mid Cambrian – Upper Permian]
  - Order †Pentamerida [lower-mid Cambrian ("Toyonian") – Upper Devonian (Frasnian)]
  - Order †Protorthida [lower-mid Cambrian – Upper Devonian (Frasnian)]
  - Order Rhynchonellida [Lower-Middle Ordovician ("Llanvirn") – present]
  - Order †Spiriferida [Upper Ordovician – Lower Jurassic]
  - Order †Spiriferinida [Lower Devonian – Lower Jurassic]
  - Order Terebratulida [Lower Devonian – present]
  - Order Thecideida [Upper Triassic – present]
