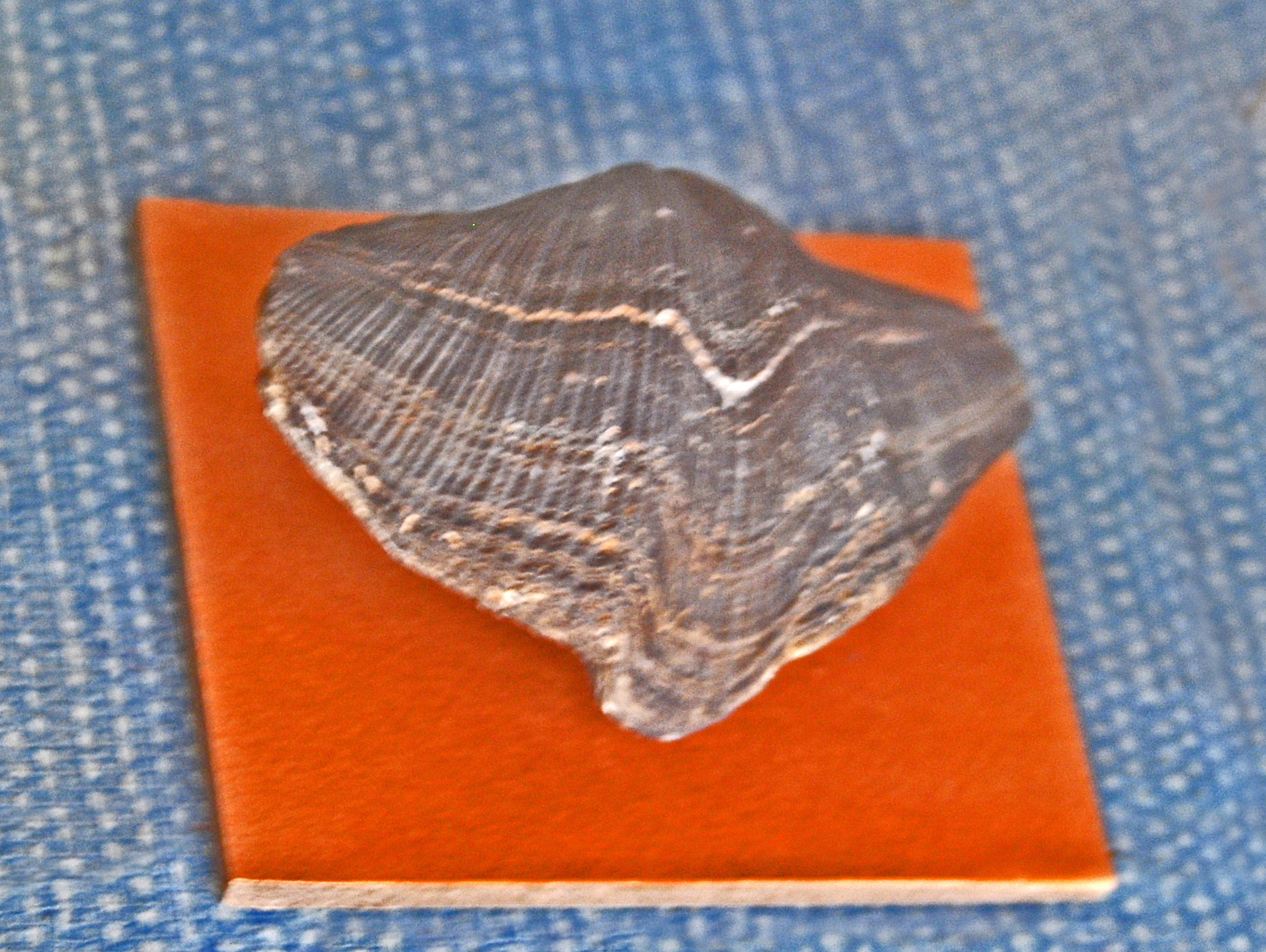
- Fossil of Gypospirifer condor

Scientific classification
- Domain: Eukaryota
- Kingdom: Animalia
- Phylum: Brachiopoda
- Class: Rhynchonellata
- Order: †Spiriferida
- Family: †Trigonotretidae
- Genus: †Gypospirifer; Cooper and Grant, 1976

= Gypospirifer =

Gypospirifer Temporal range: Carboniferous–Permian

Genus of fossil brachiopods

Gypospirifer is an extinct genus of articulate brachiopod fossils belonging to the family Trigonotretidae. They were stationary epifaunal suspension feeders.

Fossils of this genus have been found in the sediments of the Carboniferous and Permian periods (314.6 to 254.0 million years ago).

== Species ==
- Gypospirifer anancites Cooper and Grant 1976
- Gypospirifer condor d'Orbigny 1842
- Gypospirifer gryphus Cooper and Grant 1976
- Gypospirifer infraplicus King 1931
- Gypospirifer kobiyamai Tazawa and Araki 2013
- Gypospirifer nelsoni Cooper and Grant 1976
- Gypospirifer volatilis Duan and Li 1985
