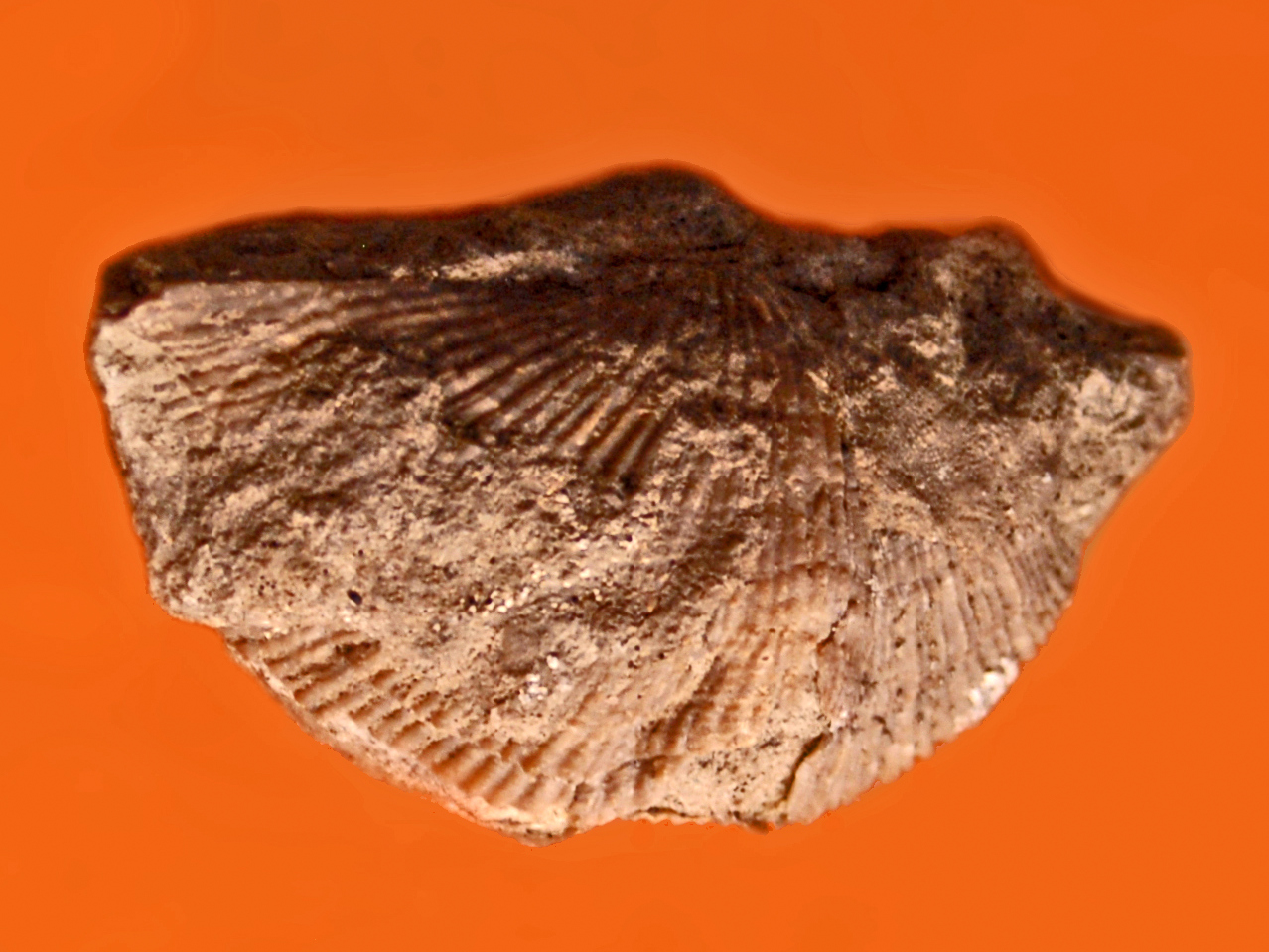
- Fossil of Neospirifer ravana from Greenland, on display at Galerie de paléontologie et d'anatomie comparée in Paris

Scientific classification
- Domain: Eukaryota
- Kingdom: Animalia
- Phylum: Brachiopoda
- Class: Rhynchonellata
- Order: †Spiriferida
- Family: †Trigonotretidae
- Genus: †Neospirifer; Fredericks, 1919

Synonyms
- Wadispirifer Waterhouse, 2004

= Neospirifer =

Neospirifer Temporal range: Carboniferous–Permian

Extinct genus of brachiopods

Neospirifer is an extinct genus of articulate brachiopod fossils belonging to the family Trigonotretidae.

These stationary epifaunal suspension feeders lived in the Carboniferous and Permian periods, from 360.7 to 252.3 Ma. Fossils of this genus have been found in the sediments of Europe, United States, Canada, China, Australia, India, Pakistan, Indonesia, Malaysia, Japan, Mexico, Argentina, Bolivia, Peru, Guatemala and Venezuela.

== Description ==
Neospirifer species have shells with robust valves, a prominent sulcus and a characteristic ridge.

== Species ==
- Neospirifer amphigyus Cooper and Grant 1976
- Neospirifer amplus Archbold and Thomas 1986
- Neospirifer apothescelus Cooper and Grant 1976
- Neospirifer arthurtonensis Waterhouse 1968
- Neospirifer bakeri King 1931
- Neospirifer borealis Manankov 2019
- Neospirifer cameratiformis Hu 1983
- Neospirifer cameratus Morton 1836
- Neospirifer campbelli Maxwell 1964
- Neospirifer chivatschensis Zavodowsky 1968
- Neospirifer concentricus Waterhouse 1987
- Neospirifer crassiconchialis Zavodovsky 1959
- Neospirifer dunbari King 1933
- Neospirifer fasciger Keyserling 1846
- Neospirifer foordi Archbold and Thomas 1986
- Neospirifer formulosus Cooper and Grant 1976
- Neospirifer goreii Mather 1915
- Neospirifer gortani Heritsch 1931
- Neospirifer grandis Solomina 1988
- Neospirifer groenwalli Dunbar 1962
- Neospirifer huecoensis King 1931
- Neospirifer incipiens Plodowski 1968
- Neospirifer invisus Zavodovsky 1958
- Neospirifer kalashnikovi Waterhouse 2004
- Neospirifer kansasensis Swallow 1866
- Neospirifer kimsari Bion 1928
- Neospirifer koewbaidhoni Yanagida 1967
- Neospirifer lanceolatus Ivanov and Ivanova 1937
- Neospirifer latus Dunbar and Condra 1932
- Neospirifer licharewi Abramov 1970
- Neospirifer mansuetus Cooper and Grant 1976
- Neospirifer mengjiushanensis Lee and Su 1980
- Neospirifer neali Cooper and Grant 1976
- Neospirifer neocameratus Stepanov 1998
- Neospirifer neostriatus Fredericks 1919
- Neospirifer notialis Cooper and Grant 1976
- Neospirifer omolonensis Einor 1959
- Neospirifer orientalis Chao 1929
- Neospirifer paranitiensis Zavodowsky 1960
- Neospirifer parenensis Zavodowsky 1968
- Neospirifer permicus Ifanova 1972
- Neospirifer placidus Cooper and Grant 1976
- Neospirifer plana Chen 2004

- Neospirifer praenuntius Easton 1962
- Neospirifer pseudonitiensis Plodowski 1968
- Neospirifer rhomboidalis Kalashnikov 1998
- Neospirifer rhomboides Feng 1986
- Neospirifer shenshuensis Lee and Su 1980
- Neospirifer snjatkovi Zavodowsky 1968
- Neospirifer sodalis Reed 1944
- Neospirifer sterlitamakensis Gerassimov 1929
- Neospirifer striatus Martin 1809
- Neospirifer subfasciger Licharew 1934
- Neospirifer subovalis Abramov and Grigorieva 1988
- Neospirifer sulcoprofundus Liu and Waterhouse 1985
- Neospirifer tajmyrica Einor 1959
- Neospirifer tegulatus Trautschold 1876
- Neospirifer tricostatus Zavodowsky 1968
- Neospirifer trimuensis Reed 1944
- Neospirifer triplicatus Hall 1852
- Neospirifer undatus Reed 1944
- Neospirifer vagaensis Licharew 1927
- Neospirifer venezuelensis Gerth 1931
- Neospirifer wynneiformis Zavodovsky 1959
