= Eichwaldioidea =

Scientific classification
- Domain: Eukaryota
- Kingdom: Animalia
- Phylum: Brachiopoda
- Class: †Chileata
- Order: †Dictyonellida
- Superfamily: †Eichwaldioidea

Superfamily of brachiopods

Eichwaldioidea is a Brachiopod superfamily comprising the Echwaldiidae and the Isogrammidae.
