= Cymbidium (brachiopod) =

Cymbidium Temporal range: Silurian

Scientific classification
- Kingdom: Animalia
- Phylum: Brachiopoda
- Class: Rhynchonellata
- Order: †Pentamerida
- Family: †Subrianidae
- Genus: †Cymbidium; Kirk, 1926

Type species
- Cymbidium actum Kirk, 1926

Other species
- Cymbidium imitor Johnson, Boucot and Murphy

Extinct genus of brachiopods

Cymbidium is a brachiopod genus in the order Pentamerida from Silurian Alaska, from the Cape Phillips Formation from Baillie-Hamilton Island, Arctic Canada and Malaya.

== See also ==
- List of brachiopod genera
