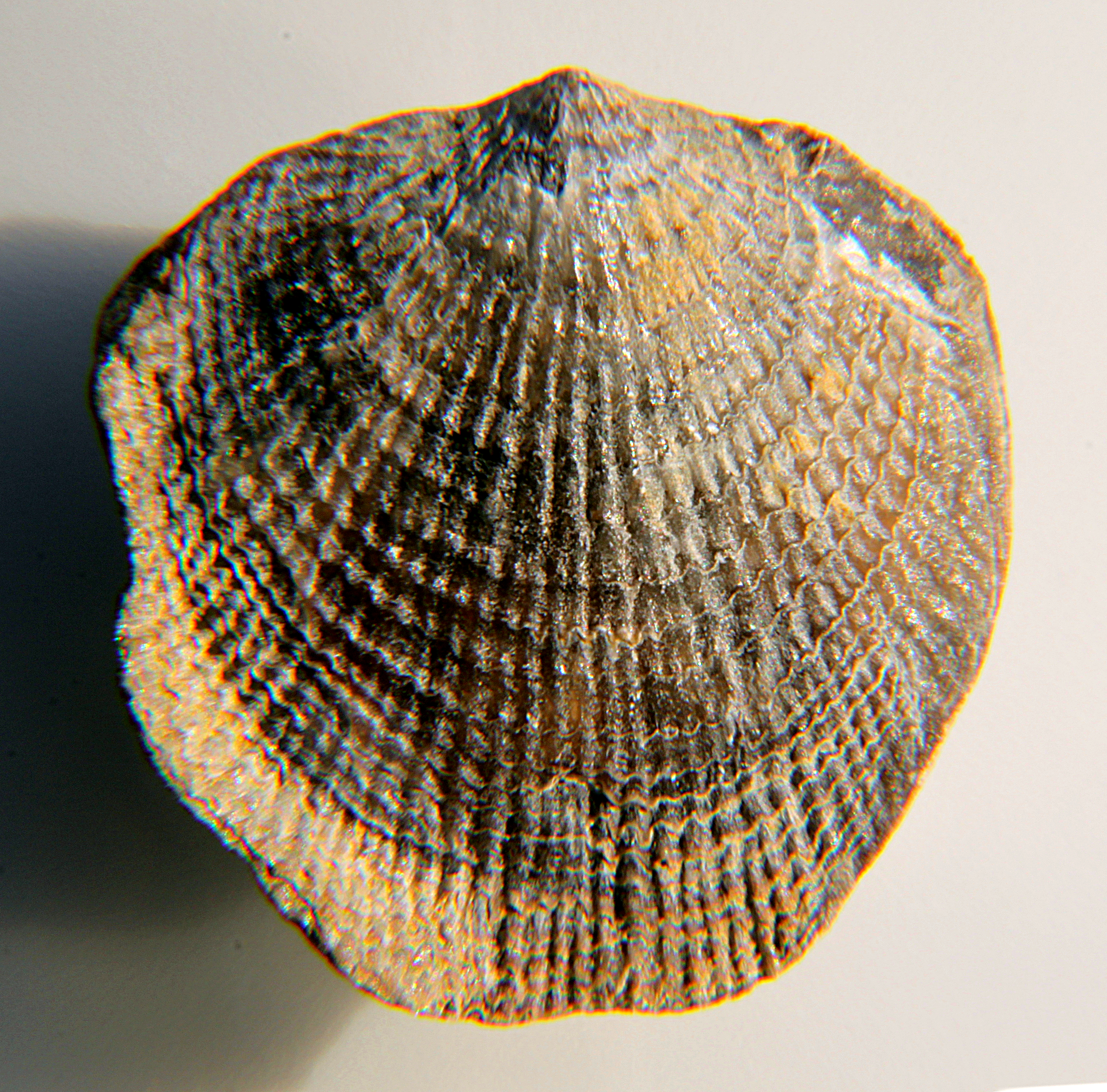
- Atrypa reticularis

Scientific classification
- Domain: Eukaryota
- Kingdom: Animalia
- Phylum: Brachiopoda
- Class: Rhynchonellata
- Order: †Atrypida

Families
- †Atrypidae; †Atrypinidae; †Atrypoidea; †Carinatinidae; †Glassiidae; †Karpinskiidae; †Kellerellidae; †Lissatrypidae; †Palaferellidae; †Punctatrypidae; †Tuvaellidae; †Zygospiridae

= Atrypida =

Atrypida Temporal range: Middle Ordovician–Frasnian

Order of extinct brachiopods

Atrypida is an extinct order of rhynchonelliform brachiopods. They first appeared in middle Ordovician and survived the Ordovician-Silurian extinction, becoming the dominant brachiopods of the Silurian alongside the order Pentamerida. They would survive into the Late Devonian before going extinct at the end of the Frasnian (Late Devonian).
