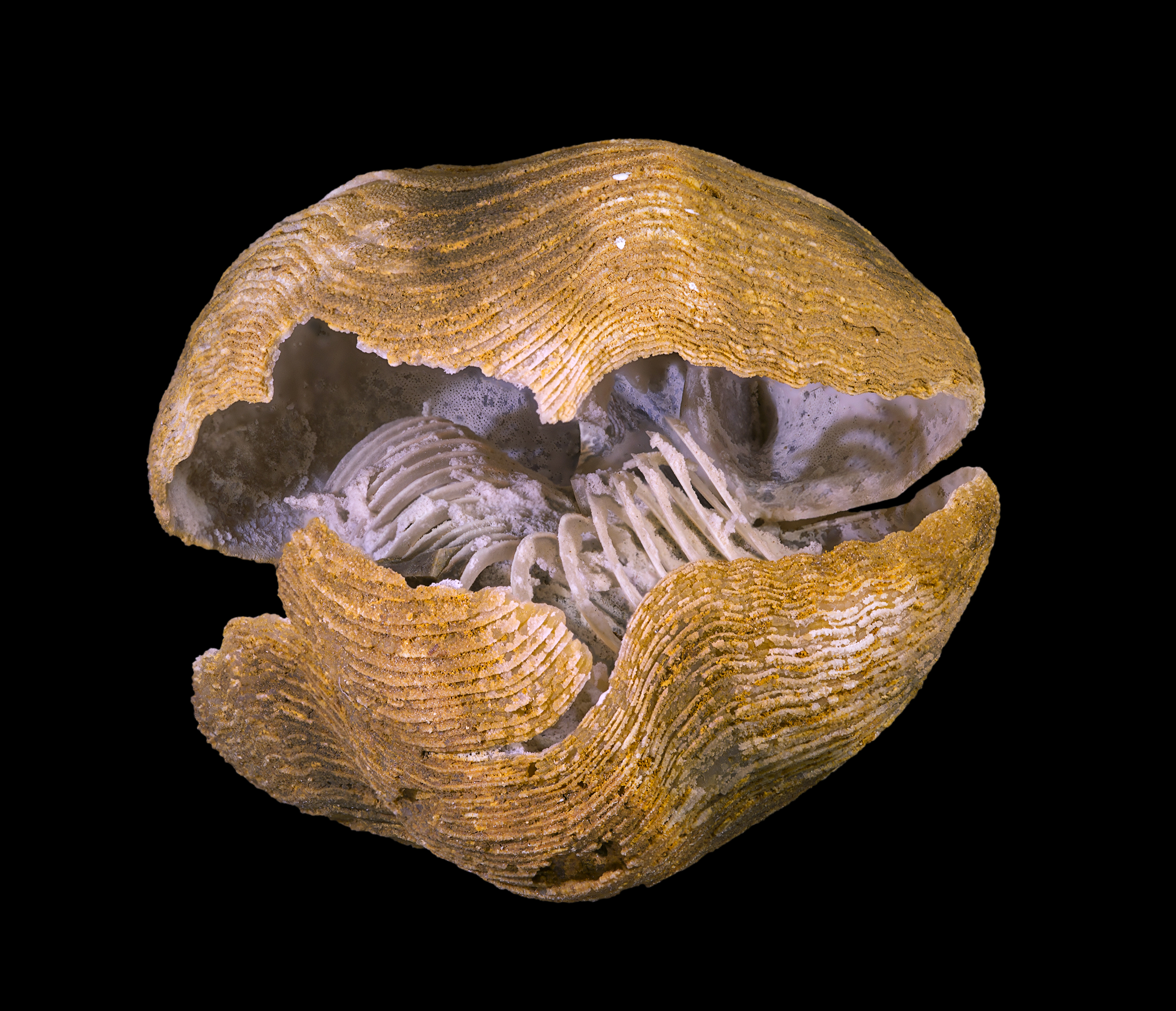
- Liospiriferina rostrata, a Liassic spiriferinide brachiopod from France. The open shell allows noticing the spiralium

Scientific classification
- Kingdom: Animalia
- Phylum: Brachiopoda
- Class: Rhynchonellata
- Order: †Spiriferinida; Ivanova, 1972

= Spiriferinida =

Spiriferinida Temporal range: Early Devonian–Early Jurassic

Order of brachiopods

Spiriferinida is an extinct brachiopod order, known from the Devonian to the Jurassic.

== Description ==
The order Spiriferinida belongs to the subphylum Rhynchonelliformea, approximately corresponding to the former subphylum Articulata (articulate brachiopods) characterised by calcareous shell with teeth and sockets, and to the class Rhynchonellata defined on the basis of the shell microstructure.

The spiriferinides are characterised by a spiralium (skeleton of the lophophore) that is oriented laterally or postero-laterally, the presence of a jugum (an element of the skeleton linking two spiralian cones), and a punctate shell. The two latter characters allow the distinction between the orders Spiriferinida and Spiriferida (the latter having and impunctate shell and no jugum); these orders were merged in older brachiopod systems.

The order Spiriferinida is divided into two suborders:

- Cyrtinidina Carter & Johnson, 1994 (Lower Devonian to Lower Jurassic), characterised by ventral valves with complex structures serving for the attachment of adductor muscles;
- Spiriferinidina Ivanova, 1972 (Upper Devonian to Lower Jurassic), with ventral valves lacking such structures.

== Distribution and examples ==
Cyrtina is the oldest spiriferinide genus and among the best known representatives of the order. It is known from the Lower Devonian (Lochkovian) to the Carboniferous from many places in the world. More than a hundred species of Cyrtina have been described.

In the Early Jurassic there were species with strongly costate shells (genus Spiriferina), finely costate shells (genus Callospiriferina), and smooth shells (genus Liospiriferina). The last spiriferinides are known from the Toarcian.

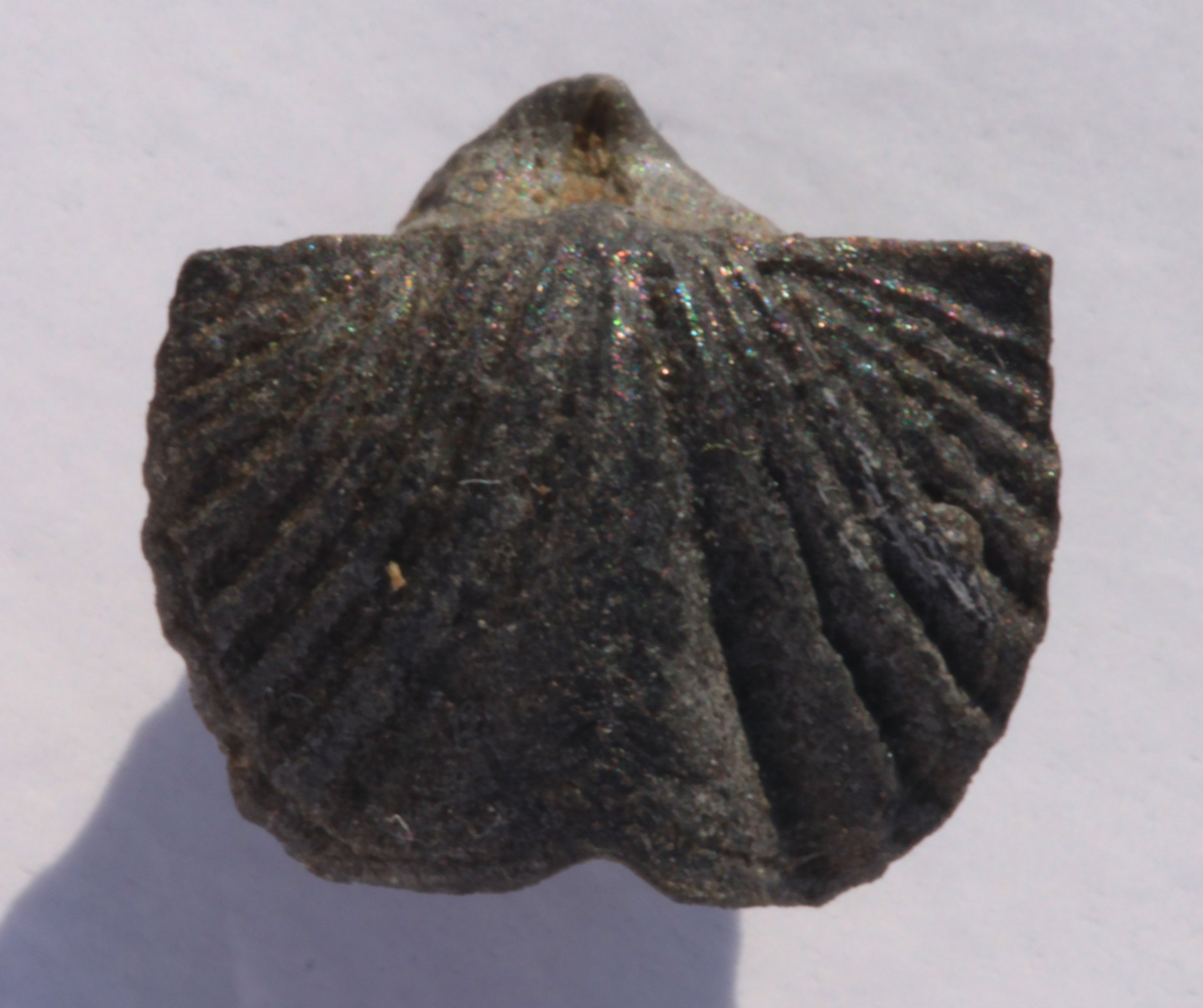
Cyrtina multiplicata (Givetian, Spain), articulated shell in dorsal view

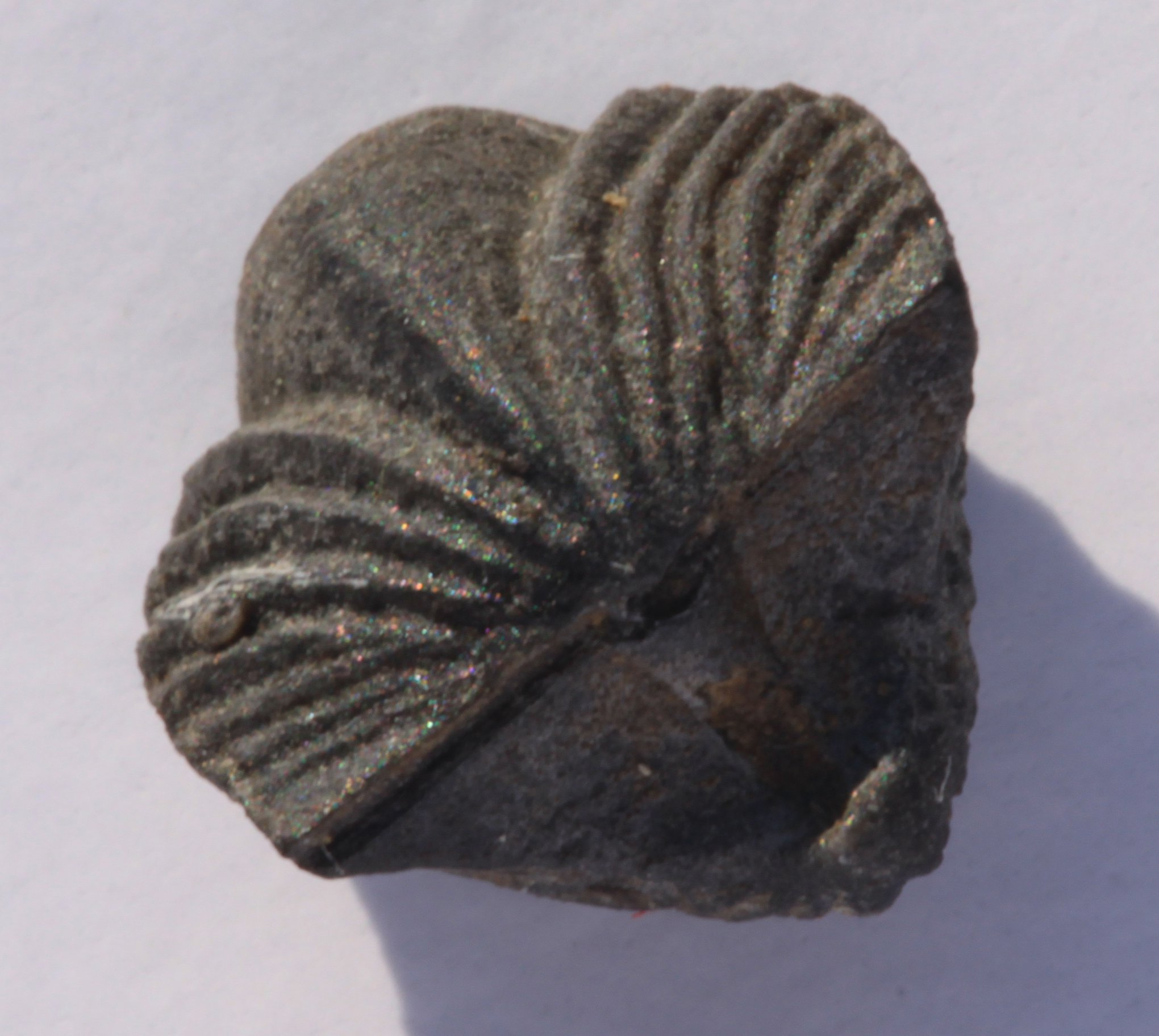
An oblique view, showing the dorsal valve and the interarea with the delthyrium

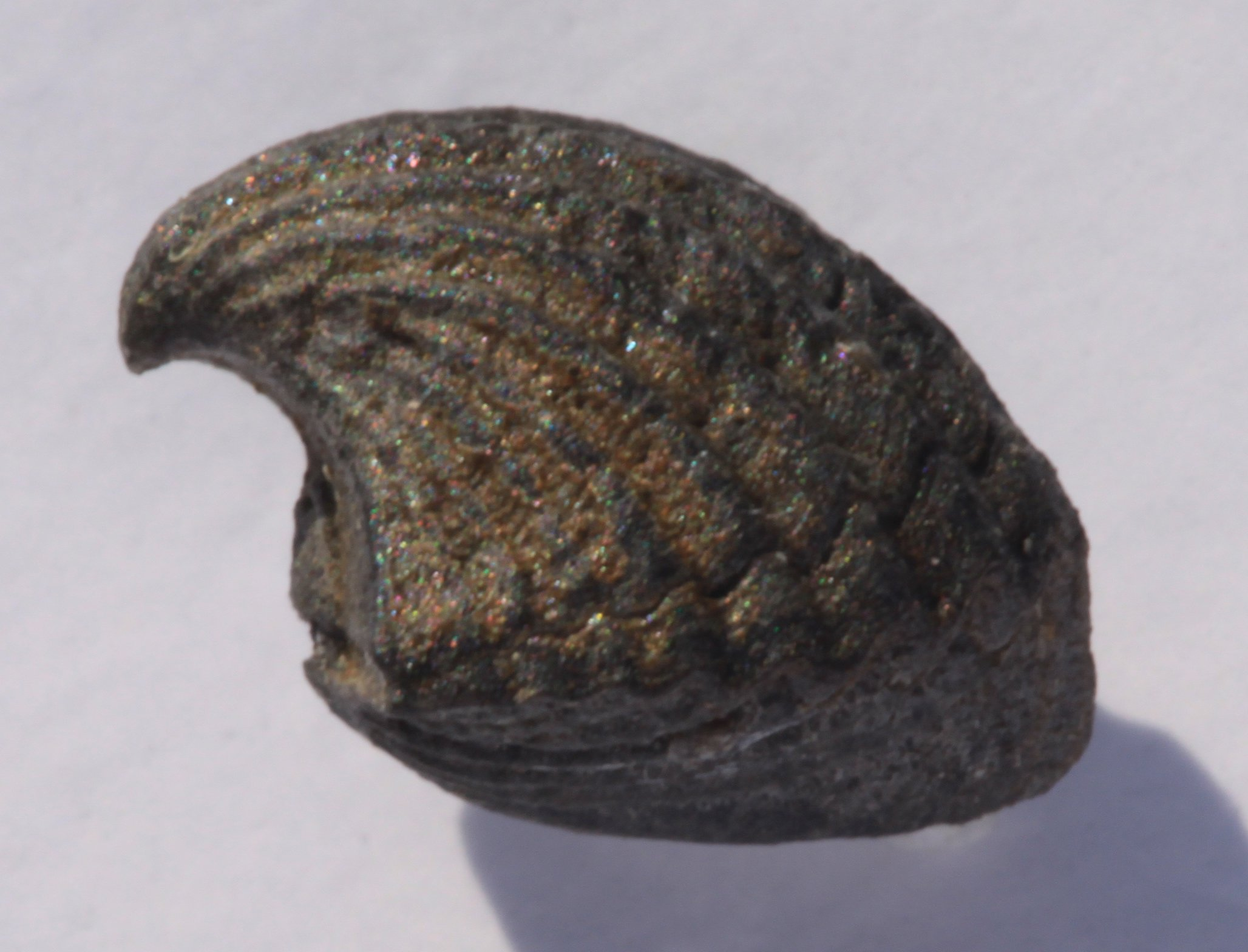
A lateral view, dorsal valve on the bottom, ventral valce on the top

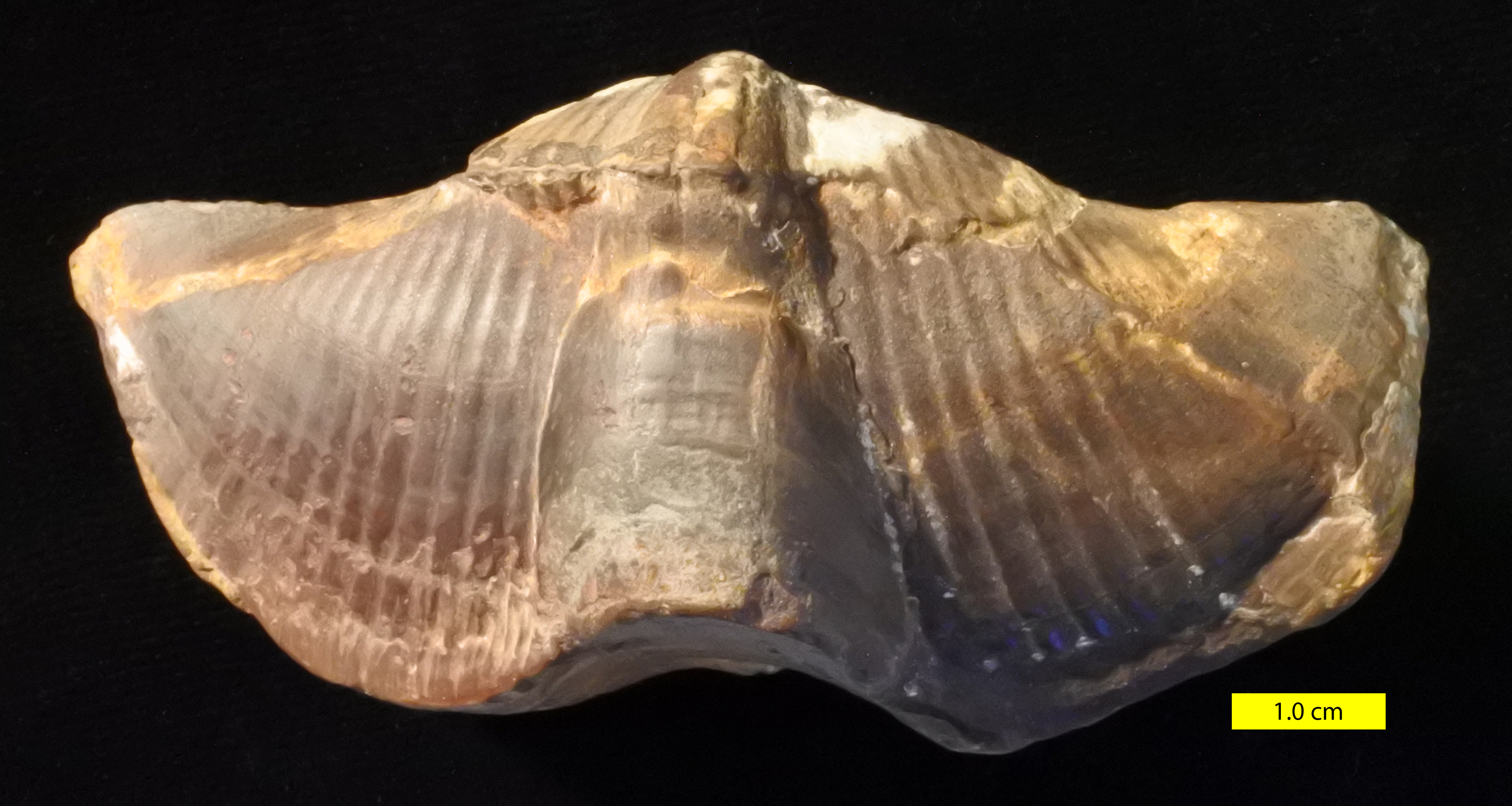
Syringothyris texta (Carboniferous, Ohio)

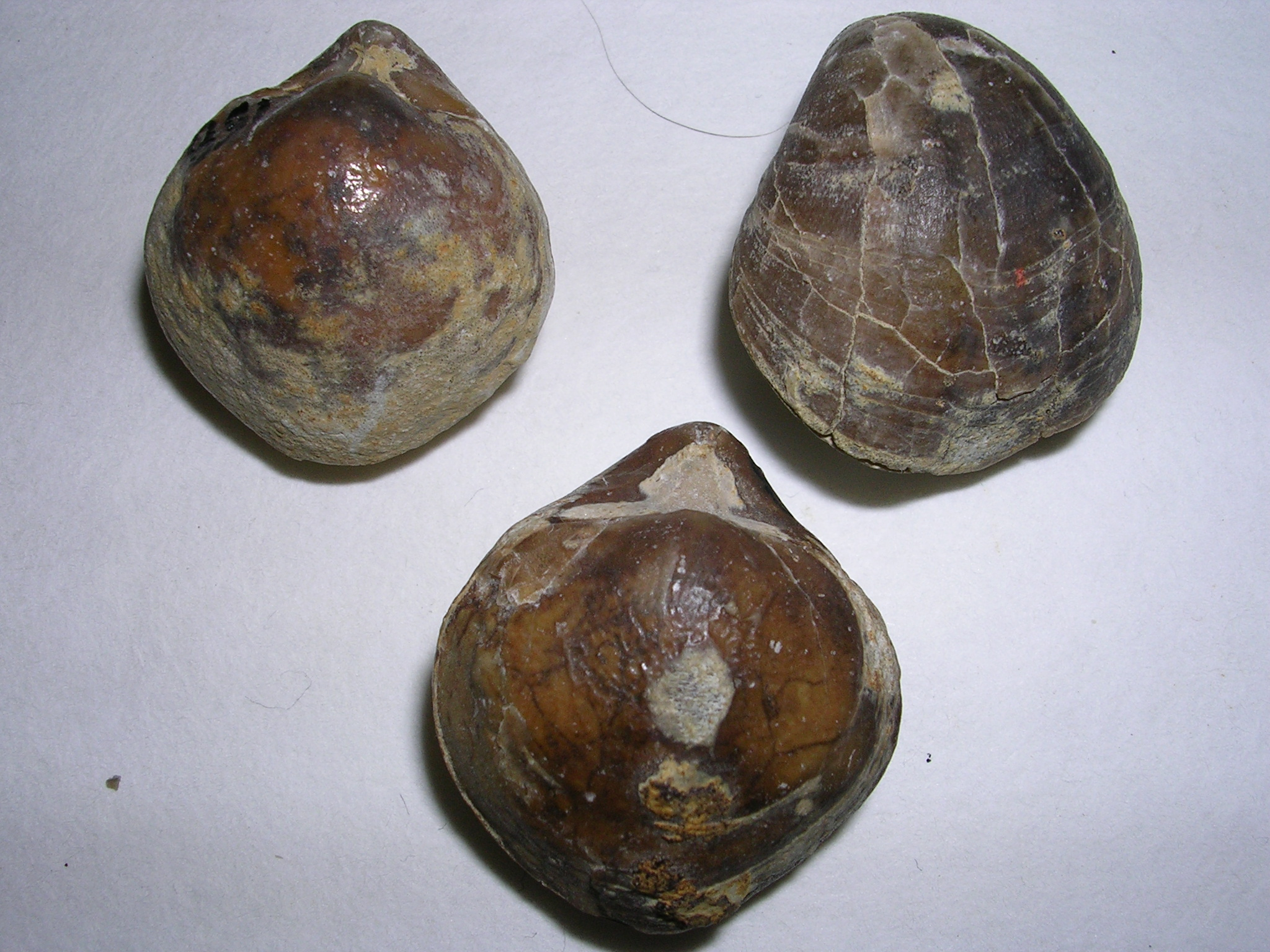
Liospiriferina rostrata (Lias, Spain)
