= Alisina =

Alisina Temporal range: Cambrian

Scientific classification
- Domain: Eukaryota
- Kingdom: Animalia
- Phylum: Brachiopoda
- Class: †Obolellata
- Order: †Obolellida
- Family: †Trematobolidae
- Genus: †Alisina

Extinct genus of brachiopods

Alisina is a Cambrian genus of Obolellid brachiopod from which soft tissue (including pedicle) is known.
