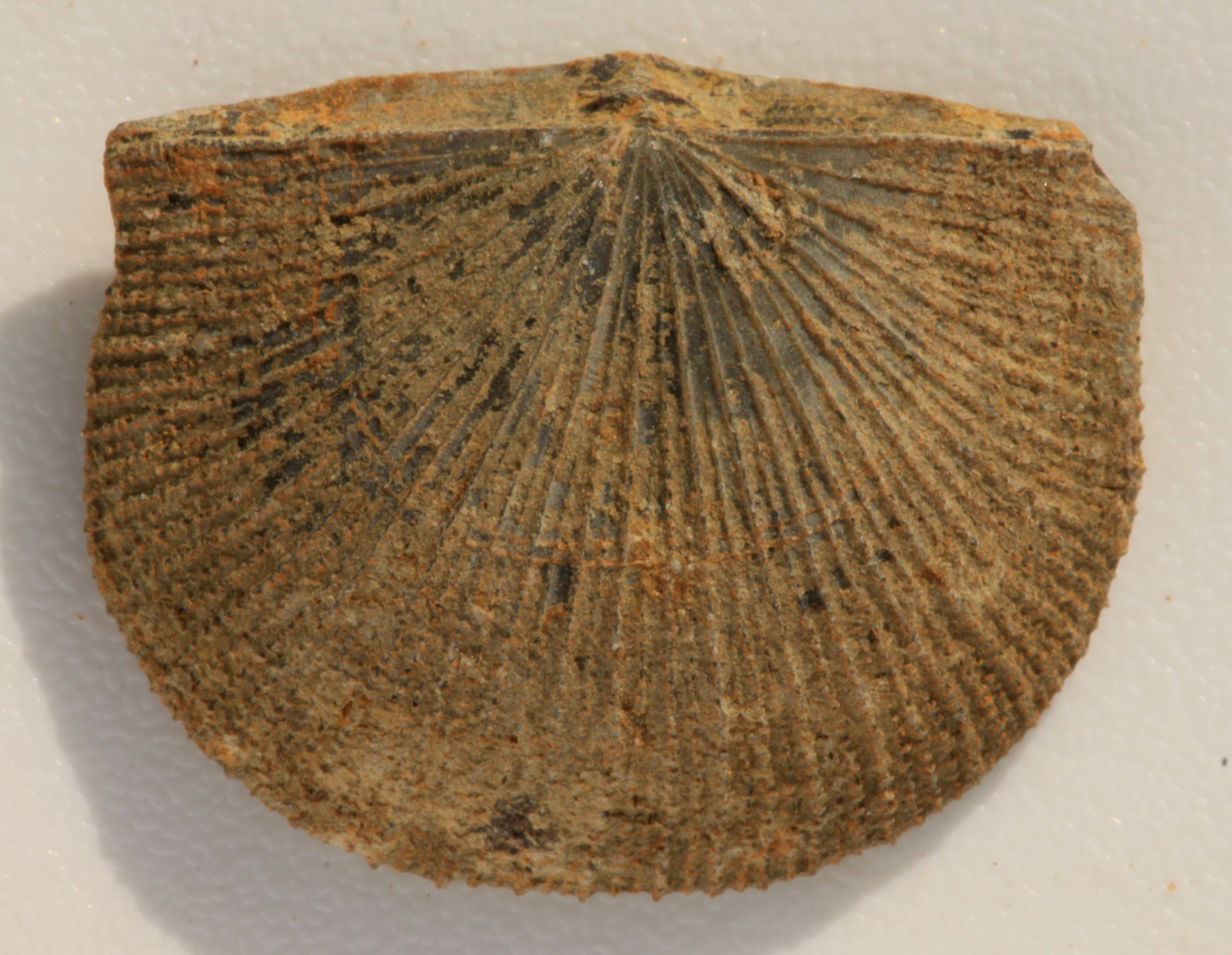
- Xystostrophia umbraculum (Middle Devonian of Poland, family Chilidiopsidae). Looking onto the brachial (dorsal) valve; the broad interarea of the ventral valve overhangs the hinge of the shell.

Scientific classification
- Domain: Eukaryota
- Kingdom: Animalia
- Phylum: Brachiopoda
- Class: †Strophomenata
- Order: †Orthotetida; Waagen, 1884

Suborders
- Orthotetidina; Triplesiidina

= Orthotetida =

Orthotetida Temporal range: Middle Ordovician–Late Permian

Extinct order of marine lamp shells

The orthotetides (Orthotetida) are an extinct order of brachiopods in the class Strophomenata. Though not particularly diverse or abundant relative to strophomenides (Strophomenida) or productides (Productida), orthotetides were nevertheless the longest-lasting order of strophomenates, surviving from the Middle Ordovician (“Llanvirn”) up until the Late Permian. Externally, many orthotetides are difficult to distinguish from strophomenides. Most fundamental differences between the two orders are internal: orthotetides have more elaborate cardinal processes and a greater diversity of shell microstructure.

== Anatomy ==
All orthotetides have a strophic (straight) hinge line, and a shell profile ranging from biconvex (both valves convex) to concavoconvex (concave dorsal valve, convex ventral valve). In most other regards, the shell profile, ornamentation, and microstructure are strongly variable between orthotetide subgroups.

=== Shell form ===
Internally, the ventral valve has a pair of deltidiodont (blunt) hinge teeth. Each tooth is preceded by a dental plate, with the form of a sharp straight crest. Externally, the ventral valve has a large interarea (broad triangular depression) at its rear edge along the hinge line. The pseudodeltidium (plate-like middle portion of the interarea) may be flat or smoothly arched. A few species bear a pedicle opening near the apex of the pseudodeltidium, but many orthotetides close up the opening.

The dorsal valve has well-developed internal cardinalia (muscle/hinge/organ attachment structures). The cardinal processes (inner crests of the cardinalia) are modified into a pair of prominent lobes or prongs extending from the shell’s inner surface. They may be flanked by an additional projection (brachiophore) on the front rim of each tooth socket. The dorsal interarea and its associated structures are small or absent, unlike their equivalents on the ventral valve.

=== Microstructure ===
The thick internal (secondary) shell layer has a microstructure of stacked laminar blades. Some othotetides are impunctate, with perfectly flat laminae in their secondary layer. Others develop tiny tubercles derived from stacked deflections oriented externally (the extropunctate condition) or internally (pseudopunctate). The extropunctate condition is unique to orthotetides. The pseudopunctate condition is characteristic of their relatives the strophomenides, with one major difference: orthotetide pseudopunctae always lack taleolae (internal calcite supporting rods). Despite their similarities, the laminar microstructure of orthotetide and strophomenide shells is most likely a case of convergent evolution, with both groups originating independently from non-laminar brachiopods.

== Subgroups ==
Orthotetida is divided into two suborders: the Triplesiidina and Orthotetidina. The Triplesiidina are probably derived from older brachiopods in the order Billingsellida, while the Orthotetidina are most likely descendants of early triplesiidines.

=== Triplesiidina ===
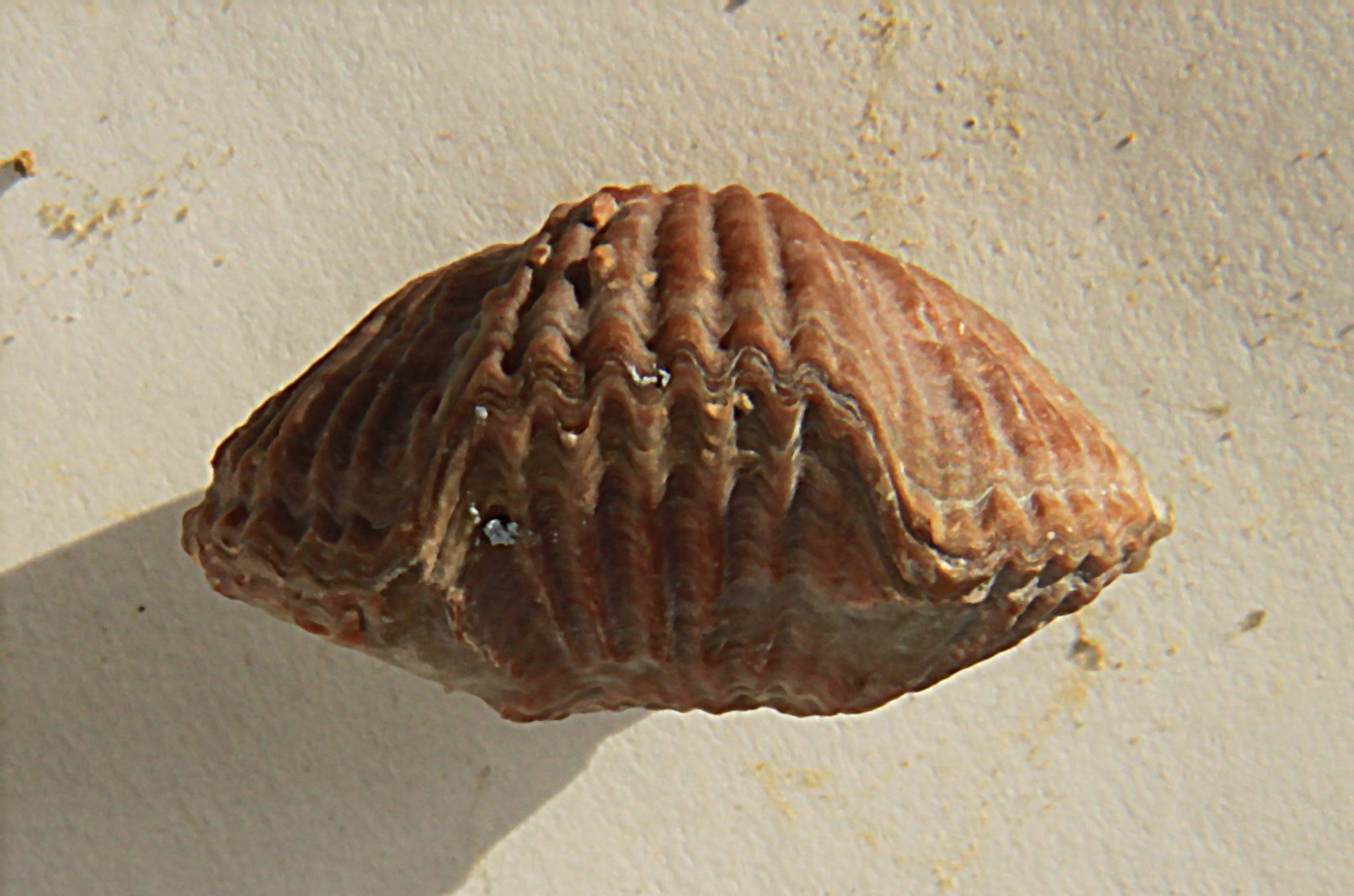
Oxoplecia gouldi (Upper Ordovician of Oklahoma, family Triplesiidae). From the front, with the brachial valve on top.

The Triplesiidina have strongly biconvex shells which are often uniplicate (with a drooping rim and a broad central sulcus on the ventral valve). The ventral interarea is enlarged, with a small pedicle opening at the apex of the pseudodeltidium. The pseudodeltidium is mostly flat, apart from a narrow vertical fold (monticulus) along its midline. The cardinal processes are horn-like, elongated and recurved prongs which are joined at the base but otherwise free-standing. The shell microstructure is typically impunctate.

=== Orthotetidina ===
The Orthotetidina tend to be slightly concavoconvex, with an ornamentation of costellae (thin ridges radiating from the back of the shell to the rim). Most orthotetidines lack a pedicle foramen, with the ventral valve cemented directly onto the substrate. Orthotetidines trend towards the development of a pseudopunctate or extropunctate microstructure to varying degrees, relative to their impunctate ancestors. In addition, small pits are often abundant near the hinge area of the ventral valve. Other trends in orthotetidine evolution include the deepening of the ventral valve, the elongation of the cardinal processes, and the development of a perideltidium (a raised surface adjacent to the pseudodeltidium).

=== List of families ===
- Suborder Orthotetidina Waagen, 1884
  - Superfamily Orthotetoidea
    - Family Orthotetidae [Lower Carboniferous – Middle Permian]
    - Family Pulsiidae [Middle Devonian – Upper Carboniferous]
    - Family Orthotetellidae [Lower Permian]
    - Family Derbyiidae [Lower Carboniferous – Upper Permian]
    - Family Meekellidae [Lower Carboniferous – Upper Permian]
    - Family Schuchertellidae [Middle Devonian – Permian]
  - Superfamily Chilidiopsoidea
    - Family Chilidiopsidae [Upper Ordovician – Middle Devonian]
    - Family Areostrophiidae [mid-Silurian (Wenlock) – Lower Carboniferous (Serpukhovian)]
- Suborder Triplesiidina Moore, 1952
  - Superfamily Triplesioidea
    - Family Triplesiidae [Middle Ordovician ("Llanvirn") – mid-late Silurian (Ludlow)]
