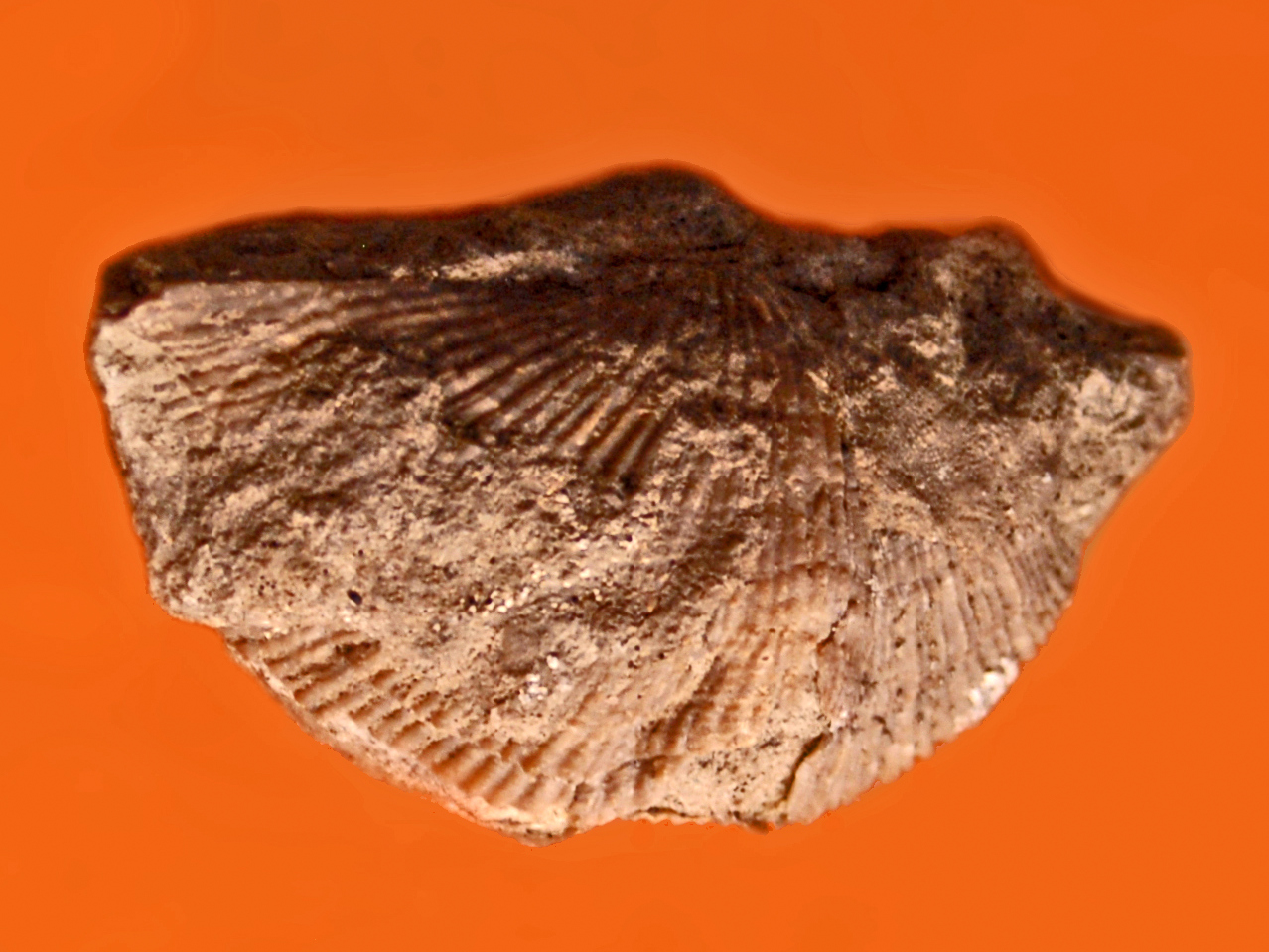
- Fossil of Neospirifer ravana from Greenland, on display at Galerie de paléontologie et d'anatomie comparée in Paris

Scientific classification
- Domain: Eukaryota
- Kingdom: Animalia
- Phylum: Brachiopoda
- Class: Rhynchonellata
- Order: †Spiriferida
- Suborder: †Spiriferidina
- Superfamily: †Spiriferoidea
- Family: †Trigonotretidae; Schuchert, 1893

= Trigonotretidae =

Trigonotretidae Temporal range: Carboniferous–Permian

Extinct family of brachiopods

Trigonotretidae is an extinct family of articulate brachiopods belonging to the order Spiriferida.

These stationary epifaunal suspension feeders lived in the Carboniferous and Permian periods, from 360.7 to 252.3 Ma.

== Genera ==
- Aperispirifer Waterhouse, 1968
- Betaneospirifer Gatinaud, 1949
- Blasispirifer Kulikov, 1950
- Brachythyrinella
- Cartorhium Cooper and Grant, 1976
- Costatispirifer Archbold and Thomas, 1985
- Crassispirifer Archbold and Thomas, 1985
- Cratispirifer Archbold and Thomas, 1985
- Fasciculatia Waterhouse, 2004
- Frechella
- Fusispirifer Waterhouse, 1966
- Gibbospirifer Waterhouse, 1971
- Gypospirifer Cooper and Grant, 1976
- Imperiospira Archbold and Thomas, 1993
- Kaninospirifer
- Lepidospirifer Cooper and Grant, 1969
- Neospirifer Fredericks, 1919
- Occidalia Archbold, 1997
- Pondospirifer Waterhouse, 1978
- Quadrospira Archbold, 1997
- Saltospirifer Cisterna and Archbold, 2007
- Septospirifer Waterhouse, 1971
- Sulciplica Waterhouse, 1968
- Trigonotreta Koenig, 1825
