= Dictyonellida =

Scientific classification
- Domain: Eukaryota
- Kingdom: Animalia
- Phylum: Brachiopoda
- Class: †Chileata
- Order: †Dictyonellida

Order of brachiopods

Dictyonellida Cooper, 1956 is a brachiopod order within the class Chileata, characterised by a perforation in the ventral valve that is extended through resorption and covered by a colleplax. The dictyonellides are known from the Upper Ordovician to the Lower Permian.
