= Colleplax =

Colleplax – a structure present in chileate brachiopods.

It is a triangular plate in the umbonal region of the ventral valve, covering an area that is otherwise externally exposed through the resorption of a part of the ventral valve. This aperture is supposed to have been covered by adhesive tissue, but no similar structure exists in any living brachiopod, so other interpretations have also been proposed.
