= Obolellata =

Obolellata Temporal range: Lower Cambrian – Middle Cambrian

Scientific classification
- Kingdom: Animalia
- Phylum: Brachiopoda
- Subphylum: Rhynchonelliformea
- Class: †Obolellata

Orders & families
- Obolellida Rowell, 1965; Obolellidae; Trematobolidae; (incomplete list); Naukatida Popov and Tikonov 1990; Tomteluvidae Streng et al 2016; (incomplete list)

Extinct class of brachiopods

The Obolellata are a class of Rhynchonelliform brachiopods with two orders, Obolellida and Naukatida. They are essentially restricted to the lower-middle Cambrian.

== Obolellida ==
Obolellida is a small, extinct order of inarticulate brachiopods that existed from the early to middle Cambrian period. The relationship of the Obolellida with other inarticulates is unclear, and were previously grouped together with the Siphonotretacea, before being given their own order.

One representative, Mummpikia, has been linked to the origin of calcitic shelled brachiopods more generally, hinting that obolellids may be paraphyletic.

Trematobolidae includes taxa such as Alisina, whose soft-part anatomy is partly known.

=== Anatomy ===
The shell is typically impunctate, biconvex, and oval or subcircular in shape. They are like other inarticulates in that, as with the lingulids, the shell has no hinge, at least in the earliest examples. It is thought they may have used a hydraulic mechanism. However they later seem to develop a primitive articulation, in which some used a levator mechanism for opening the shell. At the posterior is a ventral valve with a defined flat-shelf. The pedicle opening can be positioned at various positions.

== Naukatida ==
Some of these are coral-like creatures.
