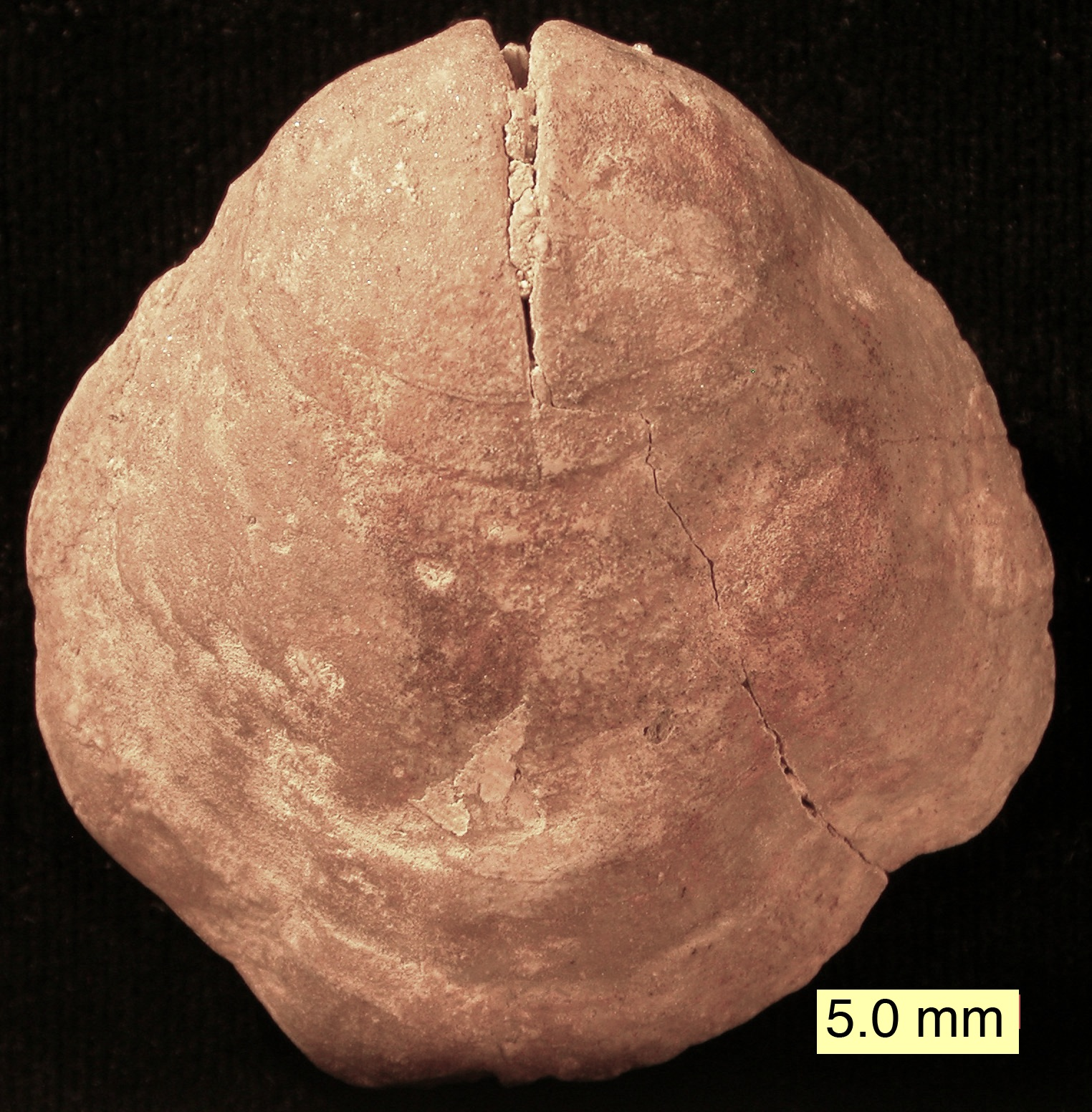
- Pentamerus internal mold (Silurian)

Scientific classification
- Kingdom: Animalia
- Phylum: Brachiopoda
- Class: Rhynchonellata
- Order: †Pentamerida; Schuchert and Cooper, 1931

Suborders
- Pentameridina; Syntrophiidina

= Pentamerida =

Pentamerida Temporal range: Mid Cambrian– Upper Devonian

Extinct order of shelled animals

Pentamerida is an order of biconvex, impunctate shelled, articulate brachiopods that are found in marine sedimentary rocks that range from the Middle Cambrian through the Devonian.

== Description ==
Pentamerids are relatively early diverging members of the class Rhynchonellata, along with the Orthids. This makes some of the early diverging members of both orders quite similar: strophic hinges, open delthyria, weak convexity of valves, lack of skeletal support for brachiophores. However, later diverging members belonging to the suborder Pentameridina are quite distinct.

Externally, Pentamerids are usually very biconvex, with astrophic(not forming a straight line) hinge lines. Though, strophic(straight) hinges are present in some very early members, as well as certain derived groups. They commonly sport a strong fold and sulcus, and have variable degrees of surface ornaments from smooth to costate(ribbed) or even rugose(wrinkled).

The internal morphology is where some of the more characteristic features of the Pentamerids can be seen. On the ventral valve interior, well-developed dental plates commonly converge on the valve floor to form a spondylium. A spondylium is a spoon-shaped skeletal plate located at the posterior apex of the ventral valve interior. It was used as a supporting seat for both diductor and adductor muscles. The spondylium was usually accompanied with a median septum, a skeletal partition that was raised along the middle. The presence of spondylia and septa can easily be seen in the internal moulds of aggregated Pentameroids, which are relatively common brachiopod fossils of the Silurian.

On the dorsal interior, crura are often spotted. Crura(singular form crus) are a pair of rod or blade-like apparatuses located on the posterior part of the dorsal valve interior. They are though to have been inner skeletal supports for the lophophores. Contrary to the Orthids, cardinal processes are rarely developed.

In the older classification of Moore, Lalicker and Fischer, 1952, the Pentamerida was regarded as simply an order in the Class Articulata and divided into two suborders, the Syntrophiacea and the Pentameracea, presented with superfamily endings of the time. The treatise on Invertebrate Paleontology, Part H Brachiopida (revised) now places the Order Pentamerida in the Class Rhynchonellata and divides it into the suborders Syntrophiidina and Pentameridina. The Syntrophiidina are the more primitive of the two.

== Palaeoecology ==
Many Pentamerids are quite biconvex, creating a globose overall shell shape. This increased the inner cavity of the shells, where both more water and bigger lophophores could be contained. Some taxa also reached gigantic sizes, with notable genera like Kirkidium, Zdimir, and Supertrilobus reaching around 20cm in length. The globose and large shells, however, cost more muscle power to open the shells, more shell material to create such large volumes, and more power to stabilize their shells on the substrate. The characteristic development of spondylia in Pentamerids worked as a solution to the first problem, supporting the muscles and helping them lift the large valves. For the second and third problems, Pentamerids evolved the thickness of their shells in a unique way. Their shells are very thick at the posterior ends, but extremely thin at the anterior. This helped them balance on the floor with the weight of the posterior ends, as well as save the expenditure of shell material by thinning out their anterior.
