= Chileata =

Chileata Temporal range: Cambrian –Permian

Scientific classification
- Kingdom: Animalia
- Phylum: Brachiopoda
- Subphylum: Rhynchonelliformea
- Class: †Chileata

Orders and Families
- Order Chileida, Superfamily Matutelloidea; Matutellidae; Chileidae; Order Dictyonellida, Superfamily Eichwaldioidea; Eichwaldiidae; Isogrammidae

Extinct class of marine lamp shells

Chileata Wiliams et al., 1996 is a class of rhynchonelliform brachiopods, characterised, among others, by the presence of a perforation in the umbonal region of the ventral valve, usually (partly) covered by a colleplax. They are known from the Cambrian to the Lower Permian.

Salanygolina may represent the chileate stem group.
