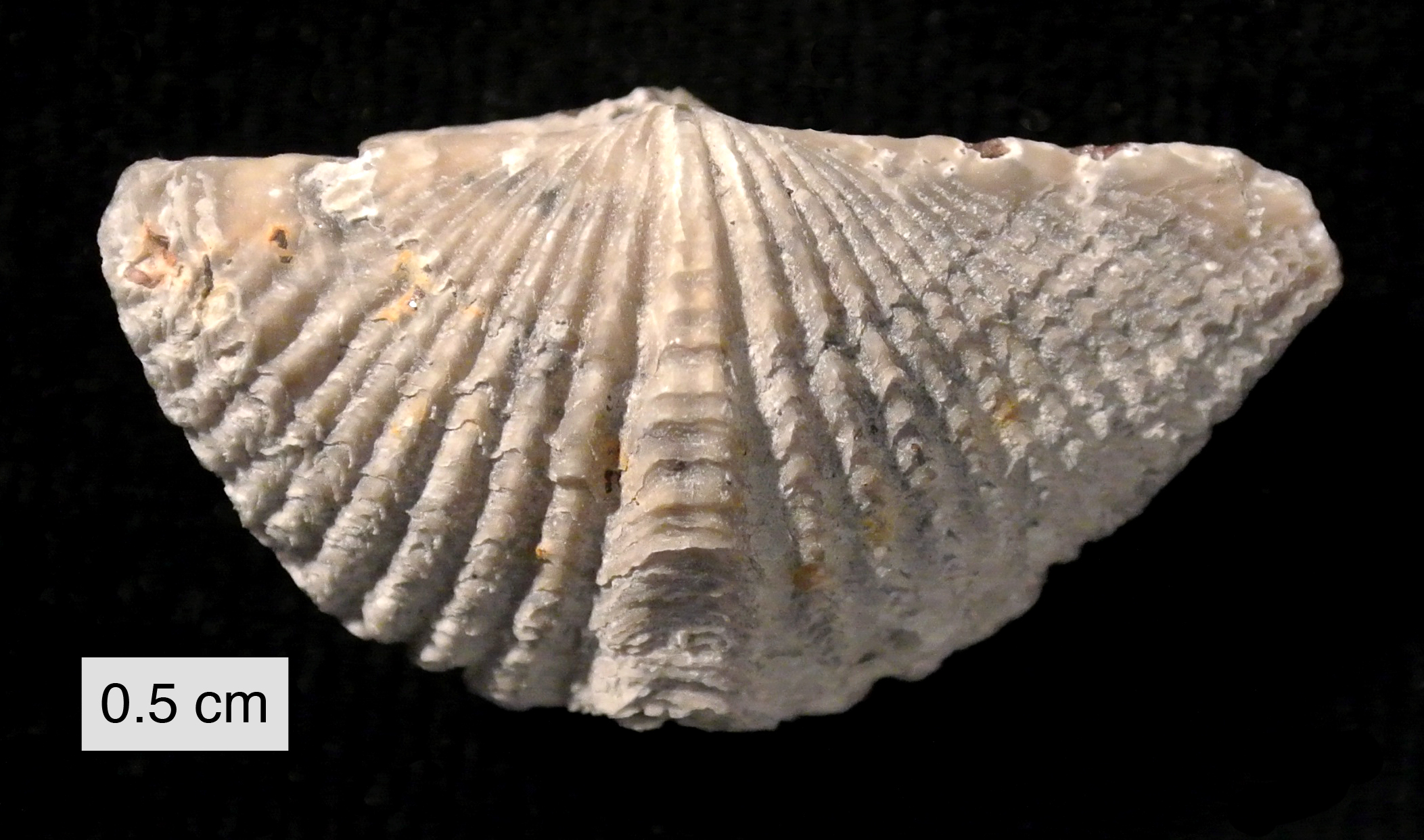
- Mucrospirifer mucronatus

Scientific classification
- Kingdom: Animalia
- Phylum: Brachiopoda
- Class: Rhynchonellata
- Order: †Spiriferida; Waagen, 1883

Subgroups
- See text.

= Spiriferida =

Spiriferida Temporal range: Late Ordovician–Triassic

Order of brachiopods

Spiriferida is an extinct order of brachiopods, known from the Ordovician to the Triassic.

== Description ==
The order Spiriferida belongs to the subphylum Rhynchonelliformea, approximately corresponding to the former subphylum Articulata (articulate brachiopods) characterised by calcareous shell with teeth and sockets, and to the class Rhynchonellata defined on the basis of the shell microstructure.

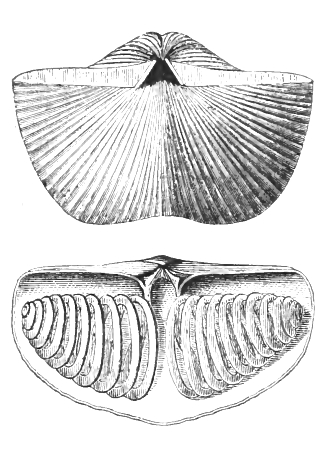
Spirifer striatus, a Carboniferous spiriferide: the top image shows the dorsal view of an articulated shell; the bottom image shows the ventral valve (the dorsal one has been removed) allowing to notice the spiralium (laterally oriented cones forming the skeleton of the lophophore)

The spiriferides are characterised by a spiralium (skeleton of the lophophore) that is oriented laterally or postero-laterally, the absence of a jugum (an element of the skeleton linking two spiralian cones), and an impunctate shell. The two latter characters allow the distinction between the orders Spiriferida and Spiriferinida (the latter having a punctate shell and a jugum). These two orders were merged in older brachiopod systems, which explains information about Jurassic spiriferides being found in older sources. The feature that gives both the spiriferides and the spiriferinides their name ("spiral-bearers") is the internal support for the lophophore; this brachidium (more precisely, a spiralium), which is sometimes preserved in fossils, is a thin ribbon of calcite that is coiled tightly within the shell forming a cone.

Externally, the spiriferides are known for their costate shells with a long hinge-line, which is often the widest part of the shell. In some genera (e.g. Mucrospirifer) it is greatly elongated, giving them a wing-like appearance. They often have a deep fold down the center of the shell. However, some spiriferides have quite different shell shapes.

== Stratigraphic range ==
Spiriferides first appear in the Late Ordovician with the appearance of Eospirifer radiatus. They increased in diversity throughout the Silurian and underwent a dramatic evolutionary radiation during the Devonian period, reaching peak development in variety and numbers. Spiriferida survived the great Permian extinction (albeit at much less diversity), finally becoming extinct during the Triassic.

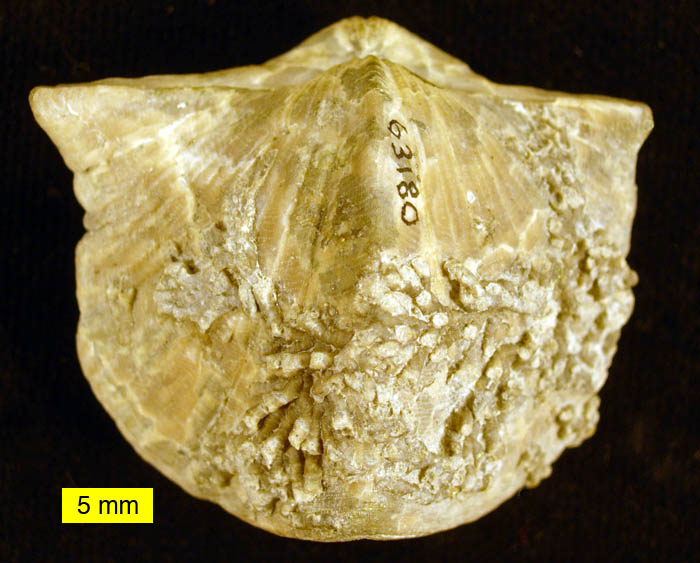
A Devonian spiriferide brachiopod from Ohio which served as a host substrate for a colony of hederellids.

== Taxonomy ==
Order Spiriferida

- Suborder Delthyridina
  - Superfamily Delthyridoidea
    - Family Acrospiriferidae
    - Family Cyrtinopsidae
    - Family Delthyrididae
    - Family Hysterolitidae
    - Family Mucrospiriferidae
  - Superfamily Reticularioidea
    - Family Elythidae
    - Family Reticulariidae
    - Family Thomasariidae
    - Family Xenomartiniidae
- Suborder Spiriferidina
  - Superfamily Adolfioidea
    - Family Adolfiidae
    - Family Echinospiriferidae
  - Superfamily Ambocoelioidea
    - Family Ambocoeliidae
    - Family Eudoxinidae
    - Family Lazutkiniidae
    - Family Verneuiliidae
  - Superfamily Brachythyridoidea
    - Family Brachythyrididae
    - Family Skelidorygmidae
  - Superfamily Cyrtioidea (syn. Cyrtiacea)
    - Family Costispiriferidae
    - Family Cyrtiidae
    - Family Hedeinopsidae
  - Superfamily Cyrtospiriferoidea
    - Family Conispiriferidae
    - Family Cyrtospiriferidae
    - Family Spinocyrtiidae
  - Superfamily Martinioidea
    - Family Crassumbidae
    - Family Elythynidae
    - Family Gerkispiridae
    - Family Ingelarellidae
    - Family Martiniidae
    - Family Perissothyrididae
    - Family Tenellodermidae
  - Superfamily Paeckelmanelloidea
    - Family Paeckelmanellidae
    - Family Strophopleuridae
  - Superfamily Spiriferoidea
    - Family Choristitidae
    - Family Imbrexiidae
    - Family Reticulariacea
    - Family Spiriferellidae
    - Family Spiriferidae
    - Family Trigonotretidae
  - Superfamily Theodossioidea
    - Family Palaeochoristitidae
    - Family Theodossiidae
    - Family Ulbospiriferidae
