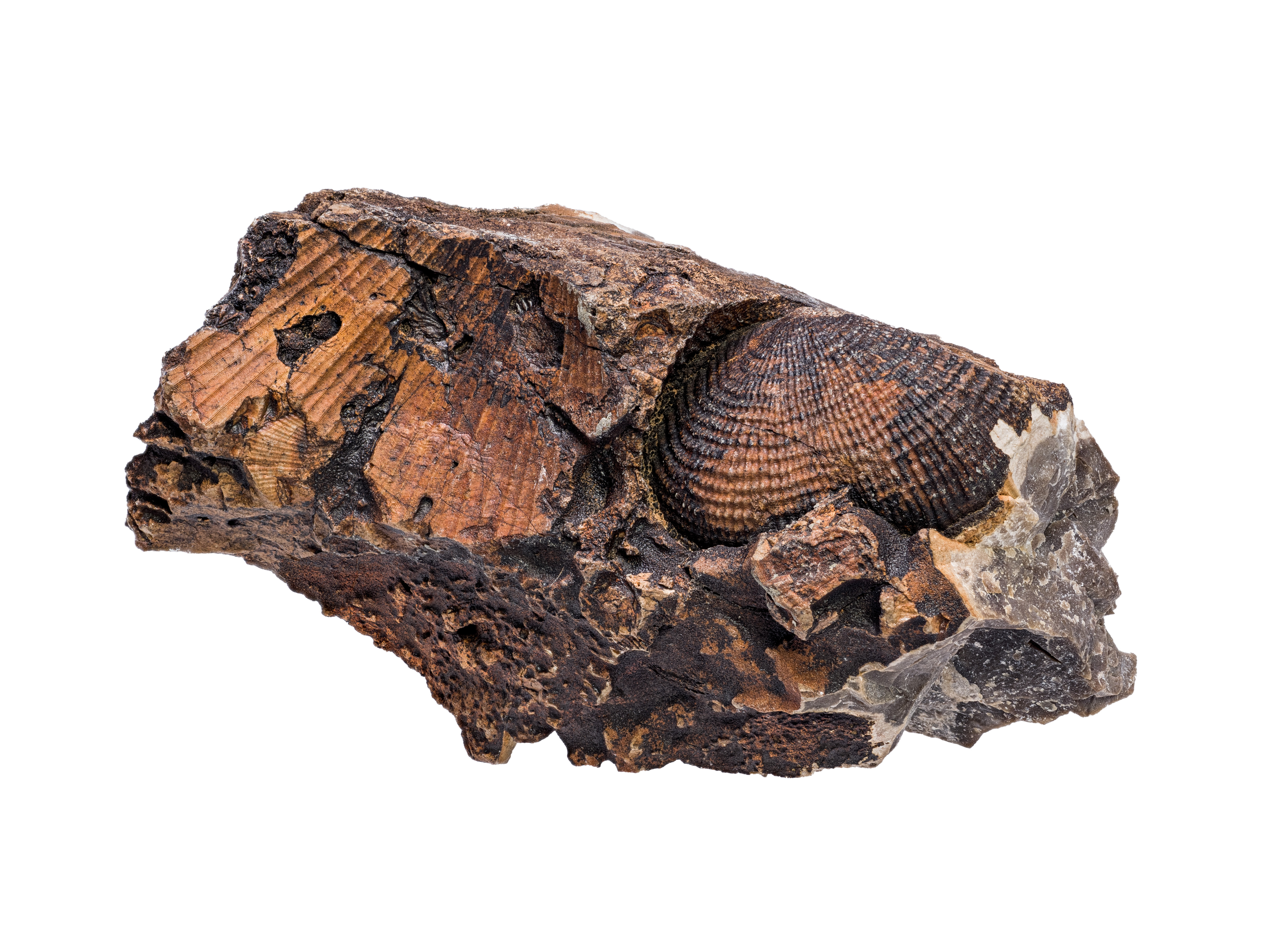
- Fossil of Productus crawfordsvillensis from the Monte Cristo Group

Scientific classification
- Kingdom: Animalia
- Phylum: Brachiopoda
- Class: †Strophomenata
- Order: †Productida
- Superfamily: †Productoidea
- Family: †Productidae; Gray, 1840

Subgroups
- Dictyoclostinae; Leioproductinae; Productinae

= Productidae =

Productidae Temporal range: Famennian–Upper Permian

Family of marine lamp shells

Productidae is an extinct family of brachiopods which lived from the Upper Devonian to Upper Permian periods in marine environments. It is the most diversified family in the suborder Productidina, with some 100 genera.

== Taxonomic history ==
The exact evolutionary relationships of Productidae as well as which groups belong to this family have been a matter of extensive debate throughout much of the 20th Century, primarily due to the three genera Buxtonia, Pustula and Juresania (with the debate later expanded to their families and subfamilies) shifting in position repeatedly between phylogenies and classifications. The emphasis on internal versus external characters to determine the systematics of these groups has largely been responsible for this: the original Treatise on Invertebrate Paleontology published in 1965 placed emphasis on internal characters (including the cardinal process) as diagnostic, whereas the 2000 revision primarily used external features and shell shape, resulting in differing classification of these clades.

More recently, Leighton & Maples (2002) conducted multiple phylogenetic analyses which are strongly in agreement that Buxtoniinae and Juresaniinae belong in Echinoconchidae rather than Productidae, and that Productidae contains only the subfamilies Leioproductinae, Dictyoclostinae and Productinae. In addition, the genus Setigerites (historically placed in Buxtoniinae) has features of both productids and echinoconchids, potentially being related to the common ancestor of the two families. The cladogram results of their phylogenetic analyses are displayed in the cladogram below:

- Productella
- - - Praewaagenoconcha
    - Sentosia
  - - Leioproductus
    - - - Spinocarinifera
        - - Diaphragmus
          - Antiquatonia
      - - - Flexaria
          - Buxtonia
        - - Pustula
          - - Echinoconchus
            - - Echinaria
              - - Pulchratia
                - Parajuresania

== Description ==
Members of this family had a deep corpus cavity (rarely moderate or shallow) and inflated ventral corpus, with rows of spines near the hinge. Hinge teeth are absent except in the oldest genera. The cardinal process of productids can be split into two main types: bi-lobed or tri-lobed.
