= List of the Paleozoic life of Idaho =

This list of the Paleozoic life of Idaho contains the various prehistoric life-forms whose fossilized remains have been reported from within the US state of Idaho and are between 541 and 252.17 million years of age.

== A ==
- †Acrothele
  - †Acrothele affinis
  - †Acrothele artemis
  - †Acrothele parilis – type locality for species
  - †Acrothele speciosa – type locality for species
- †Acrothyra
  - †Acrothyra minor
- †Acrotreta
  - †Acrotreta definita
  - †Acrotreta eucharis – type locality for species
  - †Acrotreta levata
  - †Acrotreta nitens – type locality for species
  - †Acrotreta sulcata
- †Adrianites
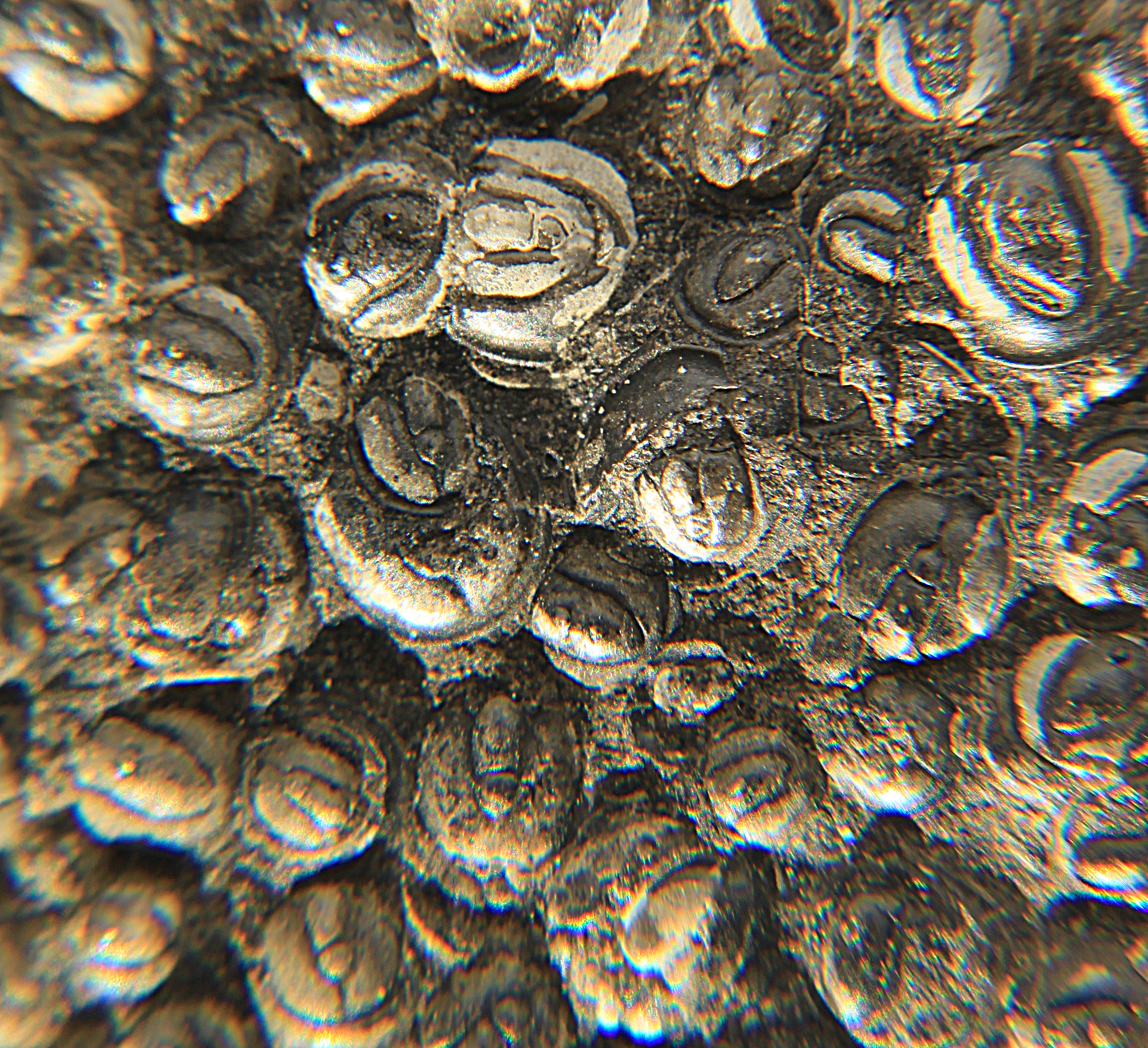
- Assemblage of fossils of the Cambrian trilobite Agnostus
  †Agnostus
  - †Agnostus bonnerensis – type locality for species
  - †Agnostus lautus – type locality for species
- †Albertella
  - †Albertella sampsoni – type locality for species
- †Allanaria
  - †Allanaria engelmanni
- †Alokistocare
  - †Alokistocare euchare – type locality for species
  - †Alokistocare idahoense
  - †Alokistocare laticaudum
  - †Alokistocare nactum – type locality for species
  - †Alokistocare natale – type locality for species
  - †Alokistocare noduliferum – type locality for species
  - †Alokistocare normale – type locality for species
  - †Alokistocare notatum – type locality for species
  - †Alokistocare nothum – type locality for species
  - †Alokistocare septum
  - †Alokistocare spencense
- †Alokistocarella
  - †Alokistocarella occidens – type locality for species
  - †Alokistocarella spencei
- †Amblycranium
  - †Amblycranium cornutum – type locality for species
  - †Amblycranium populus – type locality for species
  - †Amblycranium variabile – type locality for species
- †Ambothyris
  - †Ambothyris utahensis – type locality for species
- †Amechilus
  - †Amechilus palaora – type locality for species
- †Amphipora
- †Amplexizaphrenitis
- †Amplexizaphrentis
- †Amplexograptus
  - †Amplexograptus latus – or unidentified related form
  - †Amplexograptus manitoulinensis – or unidentified related form
  - †Amplexograptus perexcavatus
- †Amplexus
- †Ampyxina
- † Ananias
  - †Ananias nevadensis – or unidentified related form
- †Anazyga
  - †Anazyga recurvirostra – or unidentified comparable form
- †Ancenochilus
- †Anidanthus
  - †Anidanthus echaris
  - †Anidanthus eucharis – type locality for species
- †Anomalorthis
- †Anthracospirifer
  - †Anthracospirifer arcoensis – type locality for species
  - †Anthracospirifer curvilateralis
  - †Anthracospirifer leidyi
  - †Anthracospirifer occiduus
  - †Anthracospirifer shawi
- †Antiquatonia
  - †Antiquatonia sulcatus – or unidentified comparable form
- †Apatokephalus – tentative report
- †Apheorthis
  - †Apheorthis meeki – or unidentified comparable form
- †Appendispinograptus
  - †Appendispinograptus longispinus
- †Apterrinella
- †Arachniograptus
  - †Arachniograptus laqueus
- †Archaeocyathus
- Archaeolithophyllum
- †Asaphellus – tentative report
  - †Asaphellus eudocia
- †Astartella
  - †Astartella subquadrata
- †Asthenospongia – type locality for genus
  - †Asthenospongia acantha – type locality for species
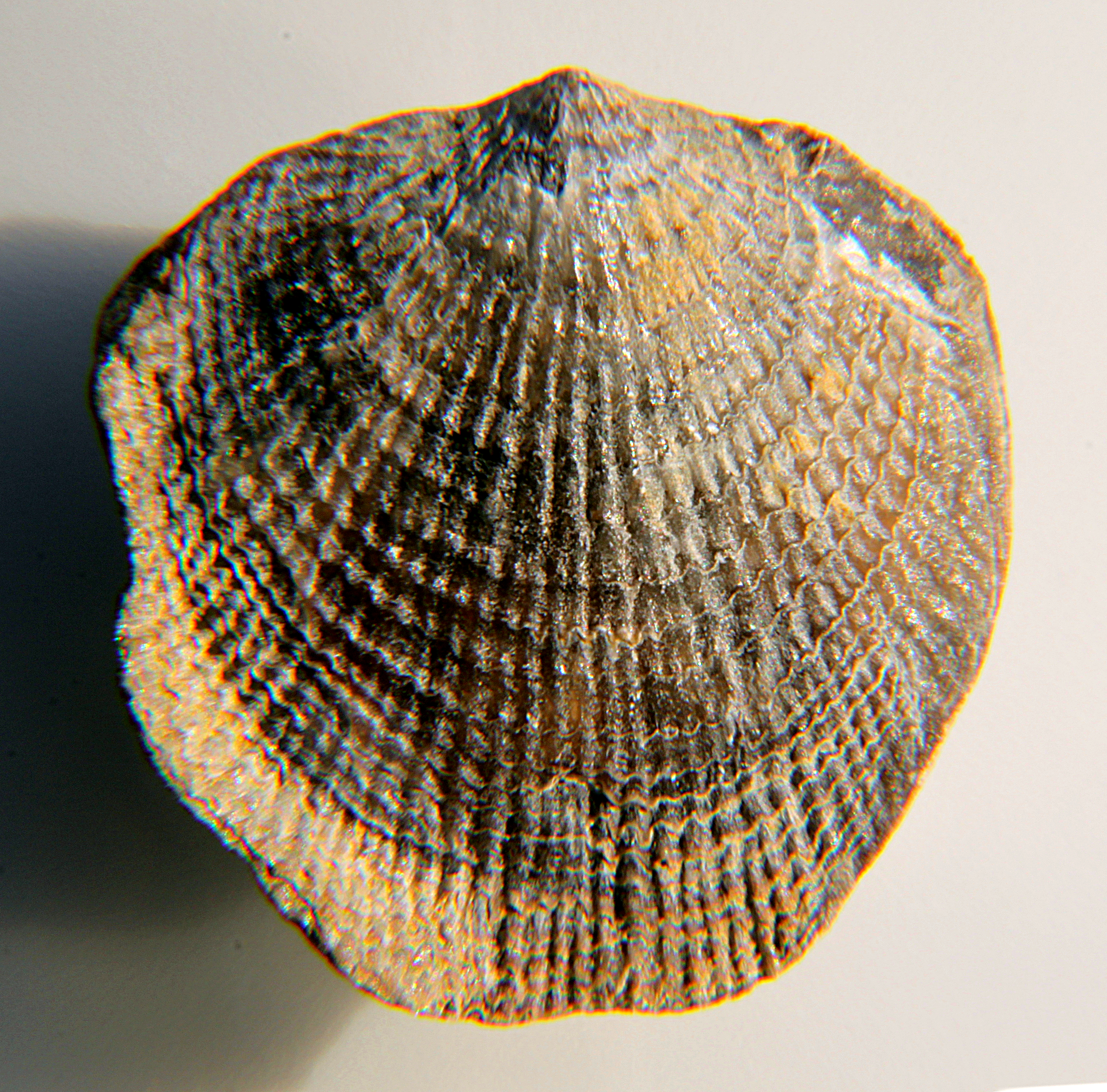
- Fossilized shell of the Late Ordovician-Carboniferous brachiopod Atrypa
  †Atrypa
  - †Atrypa oneidensis – type locality for species
  - †Atrypa putilla – or unidentified related form
- †Aulopora
- †Auloprotonia
- †Austinella
  - †Austinella whitfieldi – or unidentified related form
- †Aviculopecten
  - †Aviculopecten kaibabensis – or unidentified comparable form
- † Avonia

== B ==
- †Babylonites
  - †Babylonites conoideus
  - †Babylonites ferrieri – type locality for species
- †Bakevellia – tentative report
- †Basilicus – tentative report
- †Bathymyonia
  - †Bathymyonia nevadensis – type locality for species
- †Bathyuriscus
  - †Bathyuriscus atossa
  - †Bathyuriscus politus – type locality for species
- †Bearriverops
  - †Bearriverops alsacharovi
  - †Bearriverops borderinnensis
  - †Bearriverops loganensis – type locality for species
- †Bellaspis – tentative report
- †Bellefontia
  - †Bellefontia acuminiferentis
  - †Bellefontia chamberlaini
- †Bensbergia
  - †Bensbergia altivolvis
- †Benthamaspis
  - †Benthamaspis obrepta
- †Billingsella
- †Blastoidocrinus
  - †Blastoidocrinus carchariaedens – or unidentified comparable form
- †Brachythyris
  - †Brachythyris subcardiiformis
- †Bythicheilus
  - †Bythicheilus alveatum
  - †Bythicheilus typicum

== C ==
- †Camarotechia
- †Cancrinella
  - †Cancrinella phosphatica – type locality for species
- †Caninia
  - †Caninia excentrica
- †Cardiograptus
- †Cardiomorpha – tentative report
- †Chaetetes
- †Chancia
  - †Chancia angusta
  - †Chancia ebdome
  - †Chancia evax
- †Chonetes
  - †Chonetes logani
- †Clappaspis
  - †Clappaspis coriacea
  - †Clappaspis dotis
  - †Clappaspis idahoensis
  - †Clappaspis lanata
  - †Clappaspis spencei
- †Clavaspidella
  - †Clavaspidella bithus
  - †Clavaspidella minor – type locality for species
- †Cleiothryidina
- †Cleiothyridina
  - †Cleiothyridina miettensis
  - †Cleiothyridina obmaxima
  - †Cleiothyridina sublamellosa
  - †Cleiothyridina tenuilineata
- †Cleiothyridinia
- †Clelandia
  - †Clelandia utahensis – type locality for species
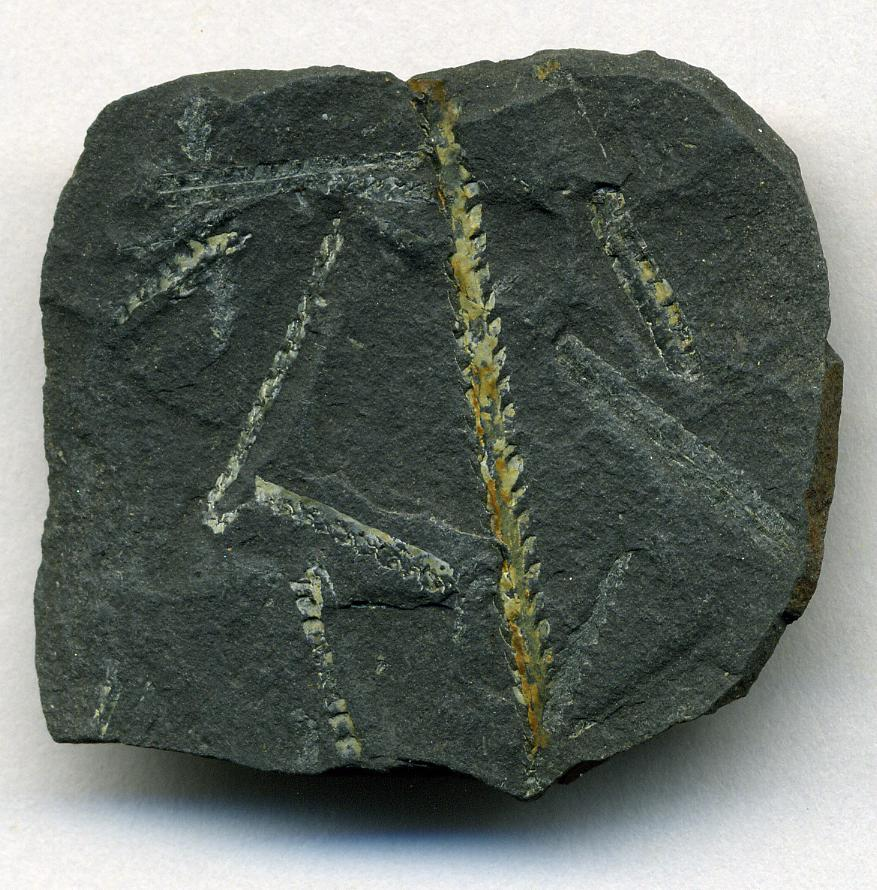
- Assemblage of fossils of the Cambrian graptolite Climacograptus
  †Climacograptus
  - †Climacograptus bicornis
  - †Climacograptus brevis
  - †Climacograptus caudatus
  - †Climacograptus hastatus
  - †Climacograptus innotatus
  - †Climacograptus minimus – or unidentified comparable form
  - †Climacograptus mohawkensis – or unidentified comparable form
  - †Climacograptus raricaudatus – or unidentified comparable form
  - †Climacograptus riddellensis
  - †Climacograptus scalaris – or unidentified comparable form
  - †Climacograptus tabuliferus – or unidentified comparable form
  - †Climacograptus tubuliferus
  - †Climacograptus uncinatus
- †Clinopistha
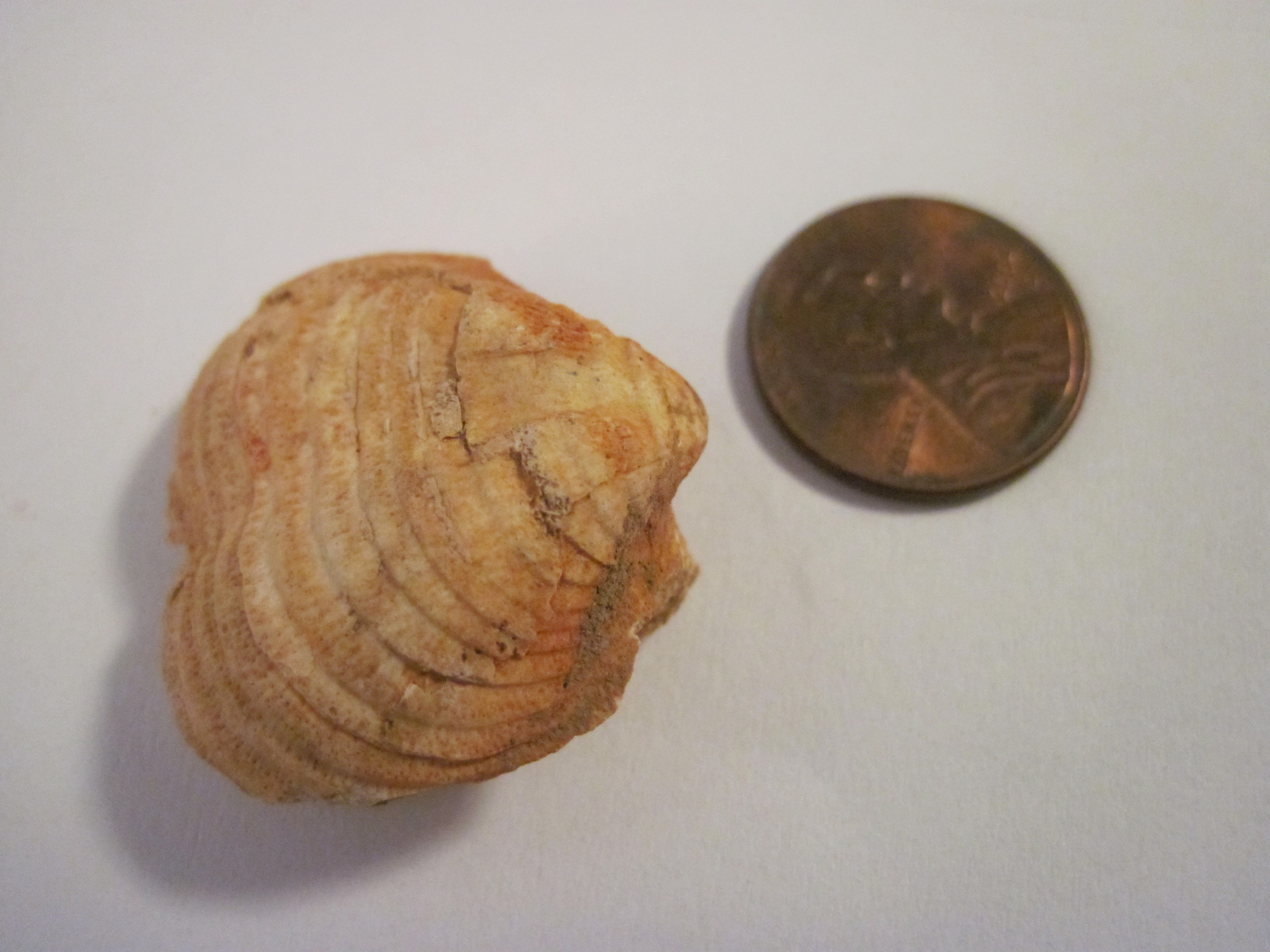
- Fossilized shell of the Late Devonian-Permian brachiopod Composita
  †Composita
  - †Composita humilis
  - †Composita humulis
  - †Composita idahoensis – type locality for species
  - †Composita mira – or unidentified comparable form
  - †Composita sigma
  - †Composita subquadrata
  - †Composita subtilita – or unidentified comparable form
  - †Composita sulcata
- †Corynoides
  - †Corynoides calicularis
- †Croixana
- †Crurithyris
  - †Crurithyris arcuata – type locality for species
  - †Crurithyris arcuatus
- †Cryptograptus
  - †Cryptograptus tricornis
- †Cyathaxonia
- †Cyclogyra – tentative report
- †Cyrtina
  - †Cyrtina acutirostris
  - †Cyrtina billingsi – or unidentified comparable form
- †Cyrtograptus
  - †Cyrtograptus grayae – or unidentified comparable form
  - †Cyrtograptus kirki
  - †Cyrtograptus laqueus
  - †Cyrtograptus rigidus
- †Cyrtorostra
  - †Cyrtorostra varicostata
- †Cystidictya
- †Cystodictya
- †Cythaxonia

== D ==
- †Daubichites
  - †Daubichites brevicostatus – type locality for species
- †Demarezites
  - †Demarezites furnishi – type locality for species
- †Derbyia
- †Diaphragmus
  - †Diaphragmus nivosus
- †Dibunophyllum
- †Dicellograptus
  - †Dicellograptus alector – type locality for species
  - †Dicellograptus angulatus – or unidentified comparable form
  - †Dicellograptus divaricatus
  - †Dicellograptus elegans – or unidentified comparable form
  - †Dicellograptus ornatus
  - †Dicellograptus sextans
- †Diceromyonia
  - †Diceromyonia tersa – or unidentified comparable form
- †Diconularia
  - †Diconularia meadepeakensis – type locality for species
- †Dicranograptus
  - †Dicranograptus brevicaulis – or unidentified comparable form
  - †Dicranograptus contortus
  - †Dicranograptus kirki – or unidentified comparable form
  - †Dicranograptus nicholsoni
  - †Dicranograptus spinifer
- †Dictyoclostus
- †Dictyoclustus – report made of unidentified related form or using admittedly obsolete nomenclature
- †Dictyonema
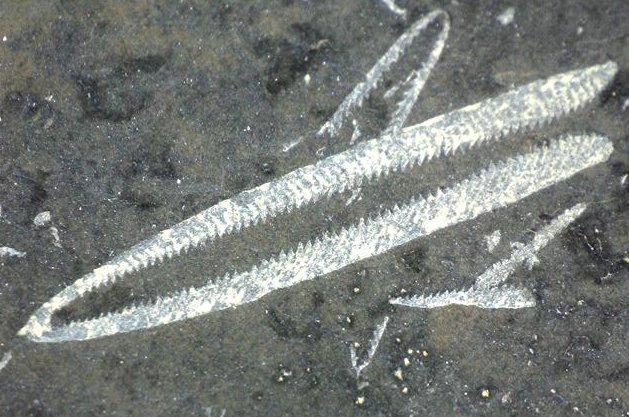
- Fossil of the Middle Ordovician graptolite Didymograptus
  †Didymograptus
  - †Didymograptus extensus
  - †Didymograptus gemminus – or unidentified comparable form
  - †Didymograptus gracilis
  - †Didymograptus protobifidus
- †Dielasma
- †Dimegelasma
- †Diparelasma
  - †Diparelasma typicum – or unidentified comparable form
- †Diphyphyllum
- †Diplograptus
- †Dolichometopsis
  - †Dolichometopsis alia – type locality for species
  - †Dolichometopsis comis – type locality for species
  - †Dolichometopsis communis – type locality for species
  - †Dolichometopsis gravis – type locality for species
  - †Dolichometopsis lepida – type locality for species
  - †Dolichometopsis media – type locality for species
  - †Dolichometopsis potens – type locality for species
  - †Dolichometopsis poulseni – type locality for species
  - †Dolichometopsis propinqua – type locality for species
  - †Dolichometopsis stella – type locality for species
- †Dorispira
  - †Dorispira arguta – type locality for species
  - †Dorispira burlingi – type locality for species
  - †Dorispira pocatelloensis – type locality for species
- †Dorlodotia
- †Dyscritella
  - †Dyscritella bogatensis
- †Dyscritellina
  - †Dyscritellina grandicora – type locality for species
  - †Dyscritellina multispinosa

== E ==
- †Echinauris
- †Echinoconchus
  - †Echinoconchus alternatus
- †Edmondia
  - †Edmondia phosphatica – type locality for species
  - †Edmondia phosphoriensis – or unidentified comparable form
- †Ehmaniella
  - †Ehmaniella maladensis
- †Ekvasophyllum
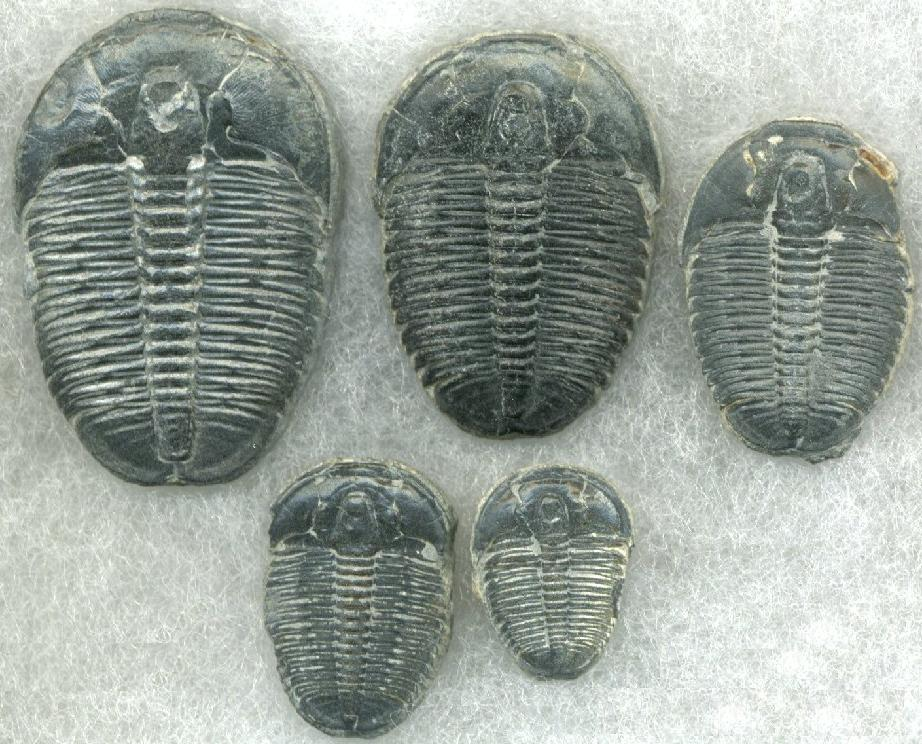
- Fossils at different stages of development of the Cambrian trilobite Elrathia
  †Elrathia
  - †Elrathia idahoensis – type locality for species
  - †Elrathia longiceps – type locality for species
  - †Elrathia offula
  - †Elrathia rara
  - †Elrathia sampsoni – type locality for species
  - †Elrathia spencei
- †Elrathina
  - †Elrathina spencei – or unidentified comparable form
- †Emanuella
- †Endothyra
- †Eochonetes
  - †Eochonetes voldemortus – type locality for species
- †Eocrinus
  - †Eocrinus longidactylus
- †Eolissochonetes
  - †Eolissochonetes pseudoliratus
- †Eomartiniopsis
  - †Eomartiniopsis rostrata
- †Eugonophyllum
- †Eumetria
  - †Eumetria costata
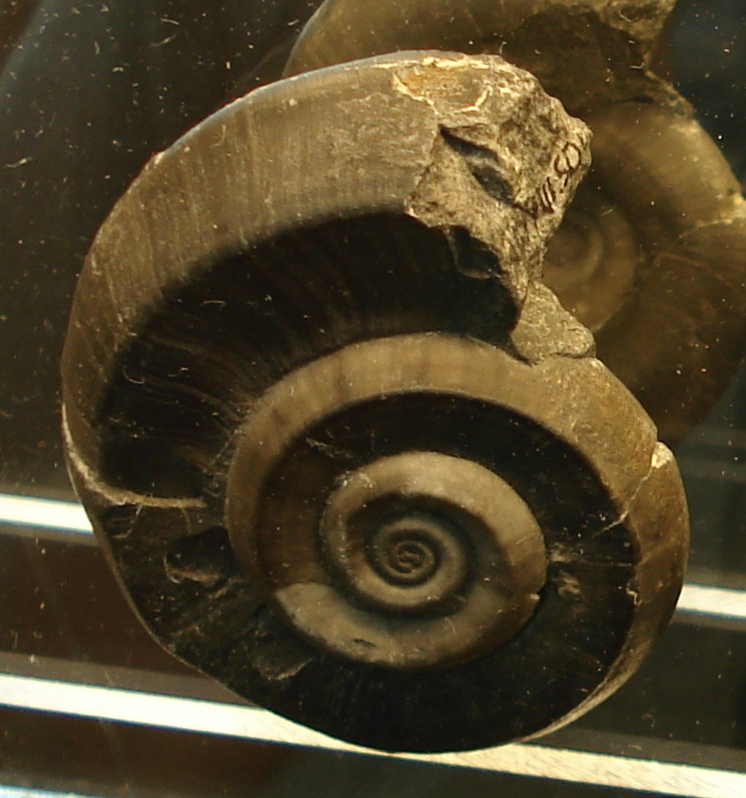
- Fossilized shell of the Silurian-Permian sea snail Euomphalus
  †Euomphalus
  - †Euomphalus subplanus

== F ==
- †Faberophyllum
- †Faberophylum
- †Faberphyllum
- †Fenestella
- †Fistulipora
- †Flectihystricurus
  - †Flectihystricurus acumennasus – type locality for species
  - †Flectihystricurus flectimembrus – type locality for species
- †Flexaria

== G ==
- †Gastrioceras – report made of unidentified related form or using admittedly obsolete nomenclature
  - †Gastrioceras williamsi
- †Genalaticurus
  - †Genalaticurus genalatus – type locality for species
- †Girtyella
- †Girtypecten
- †Girvanella
- †Glabrocingulum – tentative report
- †Glassoceras
  - †Glassoceras bransonorum – type locality for species
- †Globivalvulina
- †Glossograptus
  - †Glossograptus hincksii
- †Glossopleura
  - †Glossopleura bion
  - †Glossopleura intermedia – type locality for species
  - †Glossopleura similaris
- †Glyptograptus
  - †Glyptograptus altus
  - †Glyptograptus euglyphus
  - †Glyptograptus tamariscus
- †Glyptorthis
  - †Glyptorthis pulchra – or unidentified comparable form
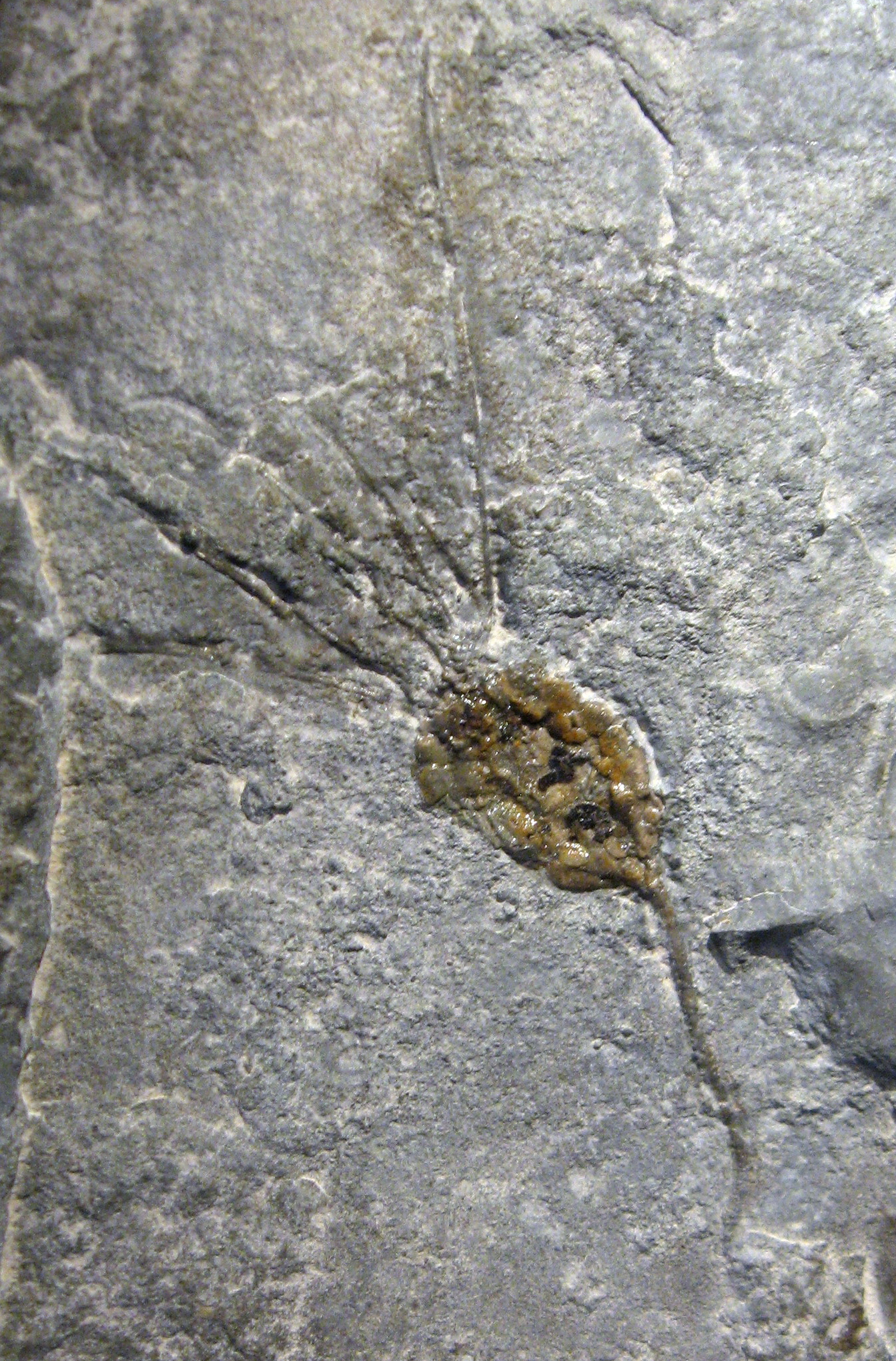
- Fossil of the Cambrian echinoderm Gogia
  †Gogia
  - †Gogia hobbsi
  - †Gogia palmeri
- †Goniograptus
  - †Goniograptus geometricus
- †Goniophrys
  - †Goniophrys prima – type locality for species
- †Gosseletina
  - †Gosseletina idahoensis

== H ==
- †Hallograptus
- †Haplophrentis
  - †Haplophrentis carinatus – type locality for species
- †Hedraites
- †Helcionella
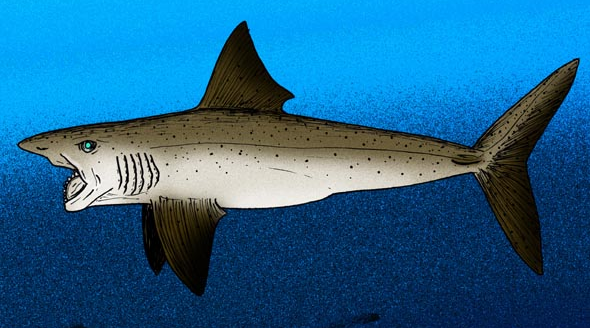
- Life restoration of the Permian Chimaera relative Helicoprion
  †Helicoprion
  - †Helicoprion davisii – type locality for species
  - †Helicoprion ergassaminon – type locality for species
- †Hesperonomia
  - †Hesperonomia dinorthoides
- †Hillyardina
  - †Hillyardina marginauctum – type locality for species
  - †Hillyardina semicylindrica – type locality for species
- †Hintzecurus
  - †Hintzecurus paragenalatus – type locality for species
- †Hintzeia
  - †Hintzeia celsaora – type locality for species
- †Homalophyllites
  - †Homalophyllites subcrassus
- †Hustedia
- †Hustedograptus
  - †Hustedograptus teretiusculus
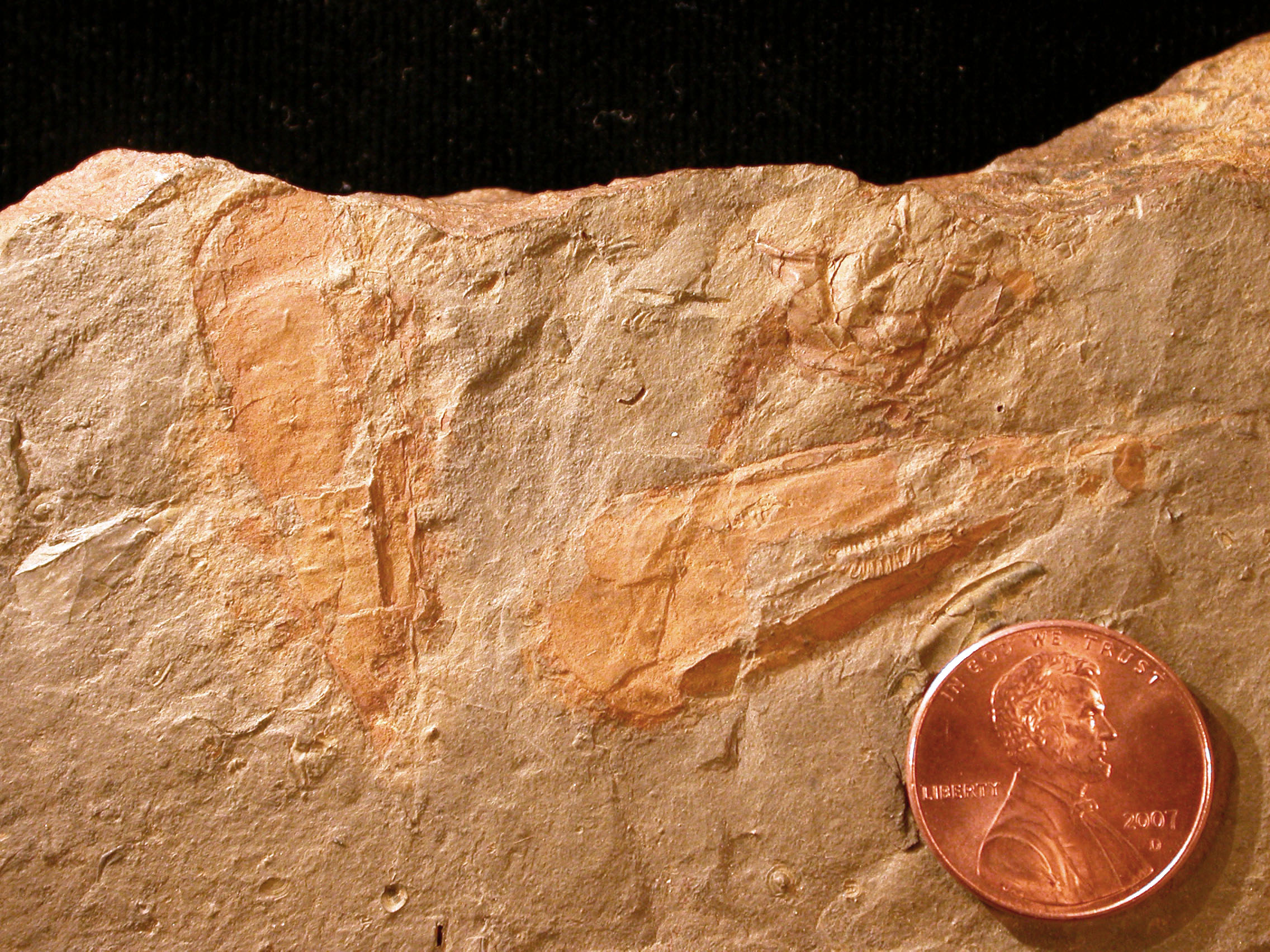
- Fossilized shells of the Cambrian-Permian brachiopod relative Hyolitha
  †Hyolithes
  - †Hyolithes ornatellus
  - †Hyolithes prolixus – type locality for species
- †Hypothetica
  - †Hypothetica rawi – type locality for species
- †Hystricurus
  - †Hystricurus contractus – type locality for species
  - †Hystricurus oculilunatus – type locality for species
  - †Hystricurus robustus – type locality for species

== I ==
- †Idahoia
- †Inflatia
  - †Inflatia inflata – or unidentified comparable form
- †Inglefieldia
- †Iphidella
  - †Iphidella grata
  - †Iphidella maladensis
  - †Iphidella pannula – or unidentified comparable form
- †Isograptus
  - †Isograptus victoriae

== J ==
- †Juresania

== K ==
- †Kaskia
- †Kazakhstania
- †Kochaspis
  - †Kochaspis maladensis – type locality for species
- †Kochiella
- †Kochina
  - †Kochina venusta – type locality for species
  - †Kochina vestita – type locality for species
  - †Kochina wasatchensis – type locality for species
- †Kochiproductus
  - †Kochiproductus longus – or unidentified comparable form
- †Komiella
  - †Komiella ostiolata – type locality for species
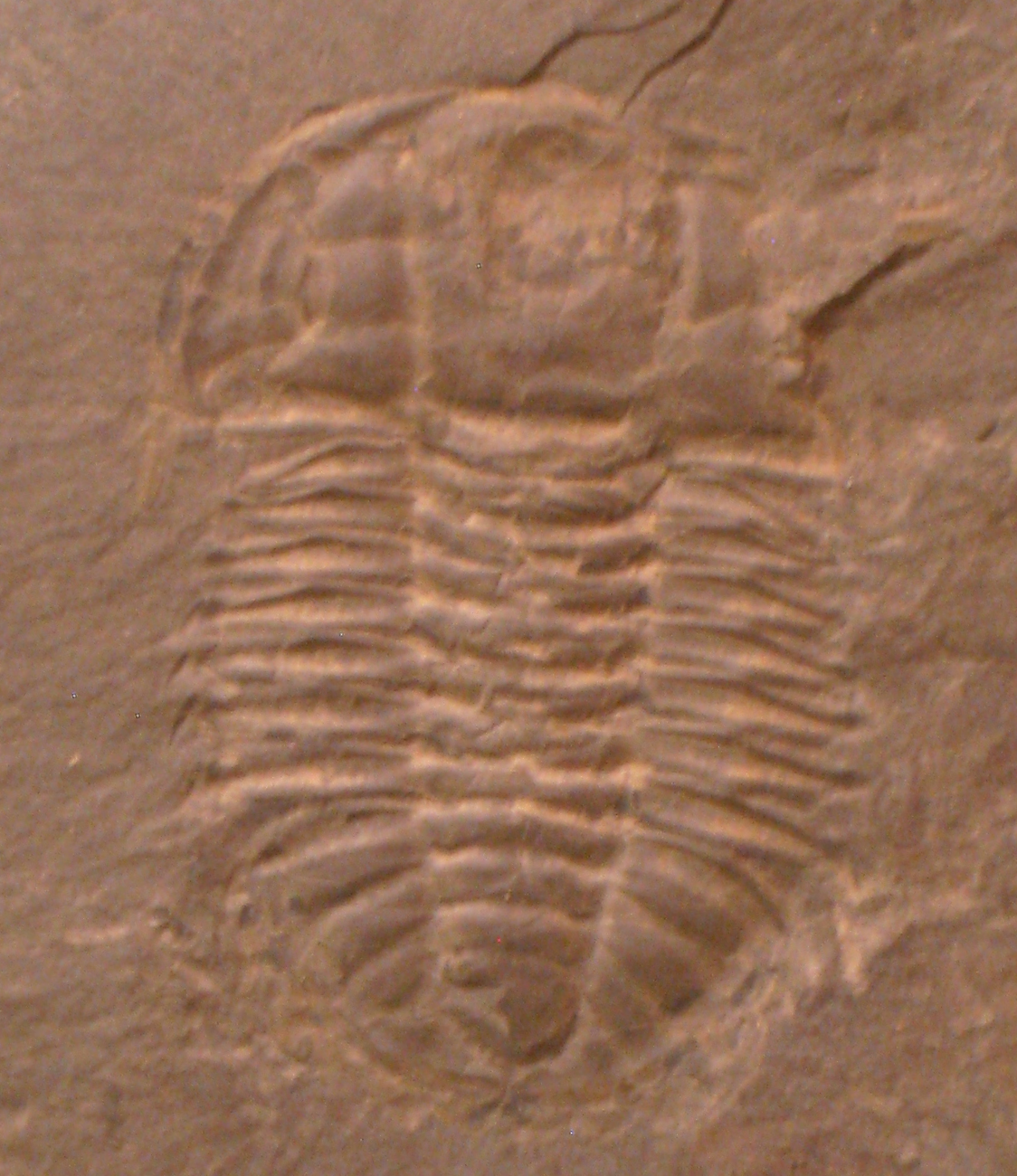
- Fossil of the Cambrian trilobite Kootenia
  †Kootenia
  - †Kootenia acicularis – type locality for species
  - †Kootenia brevispina – type locality for species
  - †Kootenia convoluta – type locality for species
  - †Kootenia granulosa – type locality for species
  - †Kootenia idahoensis
  - †Kootenia maladensis – type locality for species
  - †Kootenia nitida – type locality for species
  - †Kootenia spencei
- †Kozlowskia

== L ==
- †Lasiograptus
  - †Lasiograptus harknessi
- †Leiorhynchoidea
  - †Leiorhynchoidea carbonifera
- †Leiorhynchus
  - †Leiorhynchus carboniferum
  - †Leiorhynchus weeksi
- †Leiostegium
  - †Leiostegium manitouense
- †Leptagonia
  - †Leptagonia analoga
  - †Leptagonia missouriensis
- †Leptograptus
  - †Leptograptus demissus – type locality for species
  - †Leptograptus flaccidus
- †Licnocephala
  - †Licnocephala bicornuta – type locality for species
  - †Licnocephala cavigladius
  - †Licnocephala ovata – type locality for species
- †Lingula
  - †Lingula carbonaria
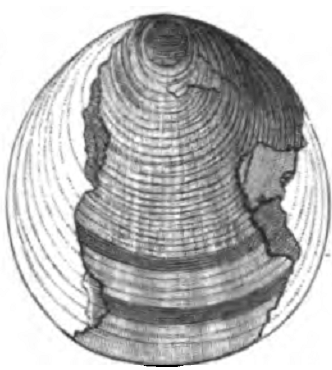
- Illustration of a fossilized shell of the Cambrian-Late Ordovician brachiopod Lingulella
  †Lingulella
  - †Lingulella eucharis – type locality for species
  - †Lingulella idahoensis – type locality for species
- †Linoproductus
- †Liosotella – or unidentified related form
- †Lithostrontionella
- †Lithostrotion
- †Lithostrotionella
  - †Lithostrotionella pennsylvanicum
  - †Lithostrotionella stelcki
- †Lithstrotionella
  - †Lithstrotionella pennsylvanicum
- †Loganiella – type locality for genus
  - †Loganiella johnsoni – type locality for species
- †Loganograptus
  - †Loganograptus logani
- †Lordorthis – type locality for genus
  - †Lordorthis variabilis – type locality for species

== M ==
- †Macropotamorhyncus
  - †Macropotamorhyncus insolitus
- †Macropyge
  - †Macropyge gladiator – type locality for species
- †Maeandrograptus
  - †Maeandrograptus tau
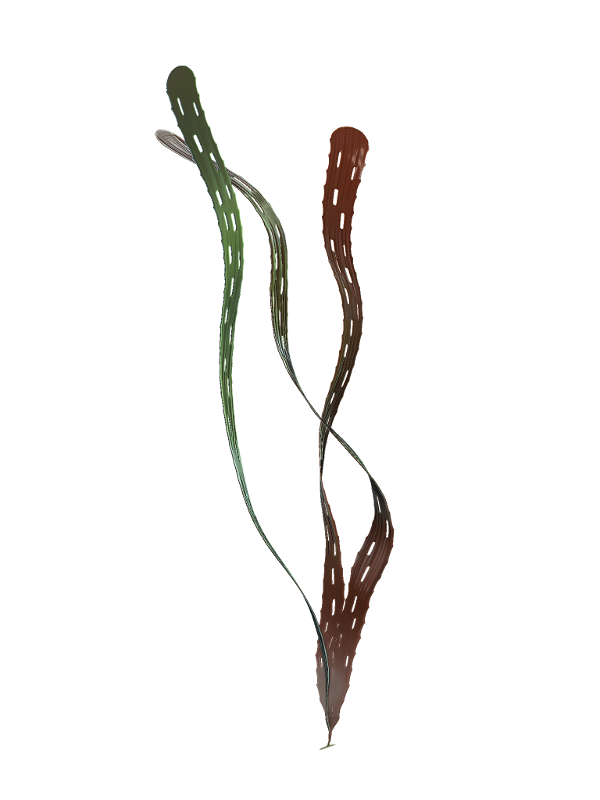
- Restoration of the mysterious Cambrian life-form Margaretia
  †Margaretia
  - †Margaretia angustata – type locality for species
- †Martinia
- †Menoparia
  - †Menoparia genalunata – type locality for species
  - †Menoparia lunalata – type locality for species
- †Metabowmania
  - †Metabowmania latilimbata – or unidentified comparable form
- †Metriophyllum
  - †Metriophyllum deminutivum
- †Michelinia
- †Micromitra
  - †Micromitra haydeni
  - †Micromitra lepida
- †Minkella
- †Monoclimacis
  - †Monoclimacis griestoniensis – or unidentified related form
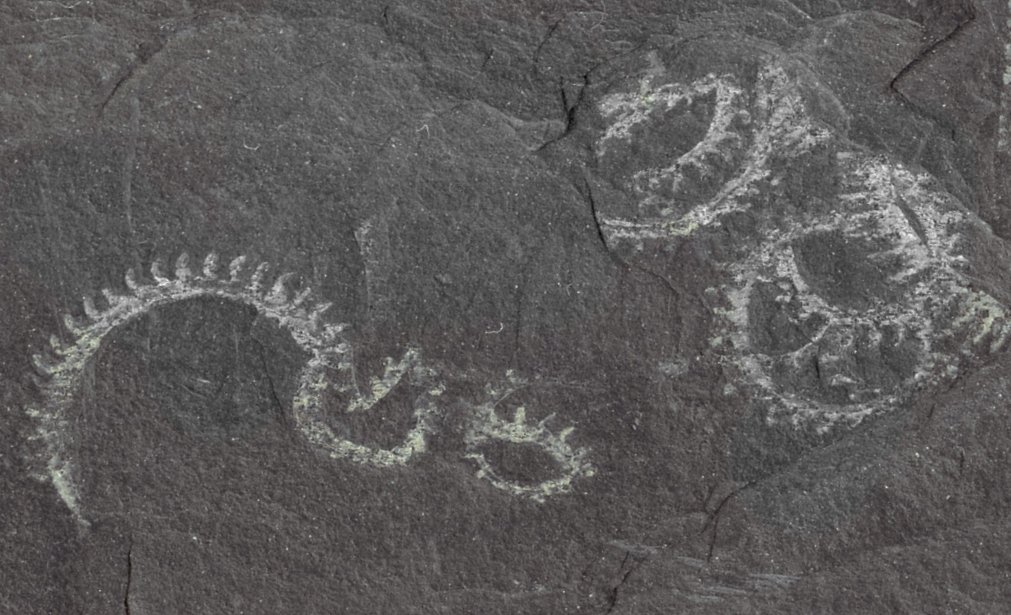
- Fossils of the Early Devonian graptolite Monograptus
  †Monograptus
  - †Monograptus argutus – or unidentified comparable form
  - †Monograptus convolutus
  - †Monograptus decipiens – or unidentified comparable form
  - †Monograptus flemingii – or unidentified comparable form
  - †Monograptus leptotheca – or unidentified comparable form
  - †Monograptus lobiferus
  - †Monograptus sedgwickii
- †Mooreoceras – tentative report
- †Morania
- †Morozoviella
  - †Morozoviella praecurriensis

== N ==
- †Nanorthis – tentative report
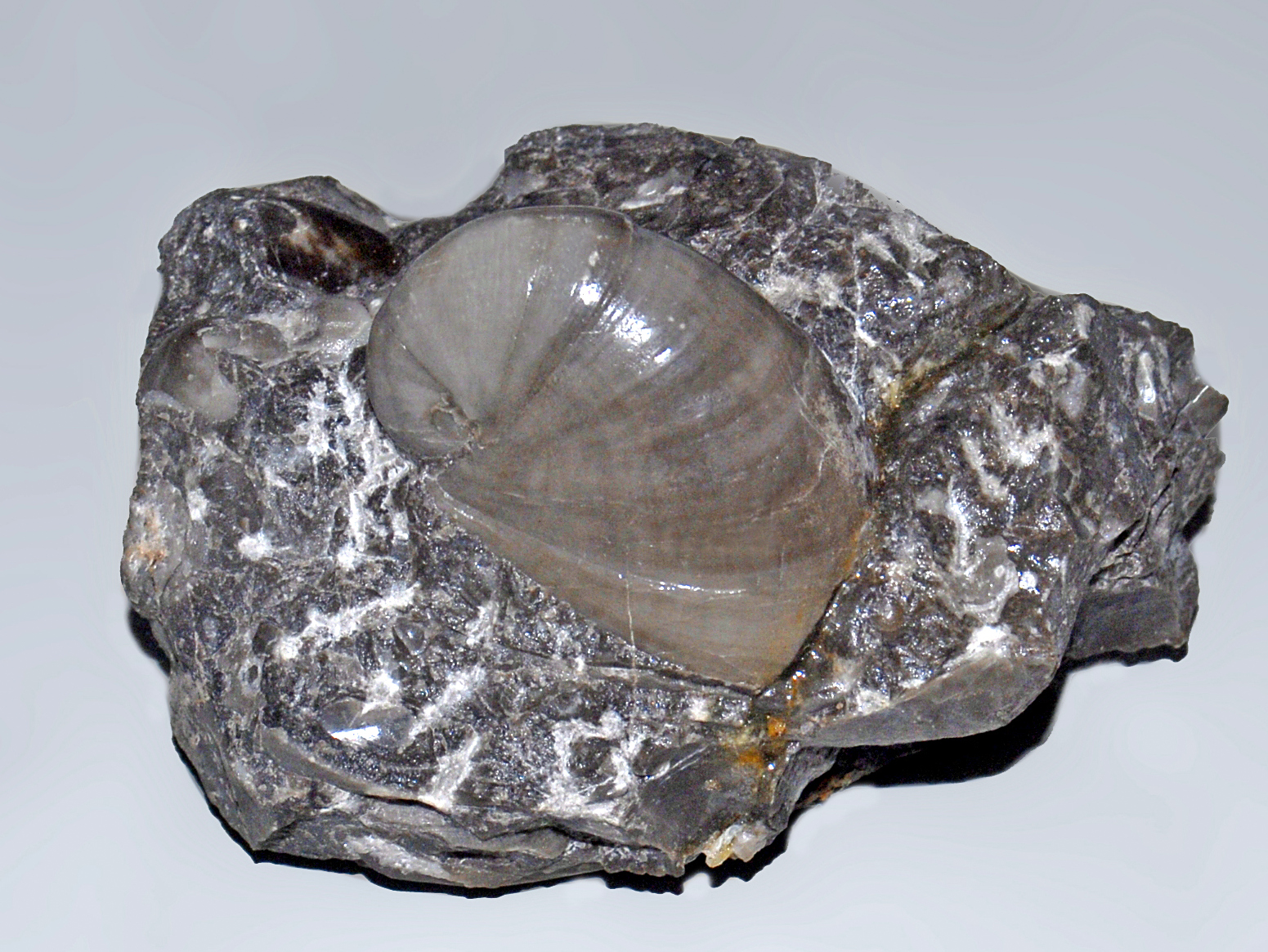
- Fossilized shell of the Early Devonian – Triassic sea snail Naticopsis
  †Naticopsis
  - †Naticopsis tayloriana – type locality for species
- †Nemagraptus
  - †Nemagraptus gracilis – or unidentified comparable form
- †Neoeridotrypella
  - †Neoeridotrypella pulchra
- †Neospirifer
- †Neurograptus
  - †Neurograptus margaritatus
- †Niobe – tentative report
- †Nuculopsis
  - †Nuculopsis montpelierensis – type locality for species

== O ==
- †Obolus
- †Oelandiella
  - †Oelandiella aequa – type locality for species
- †Ogygopsis
  - †Ogygopsis magna – type locality for species
  - †Ogygopsis typicalis
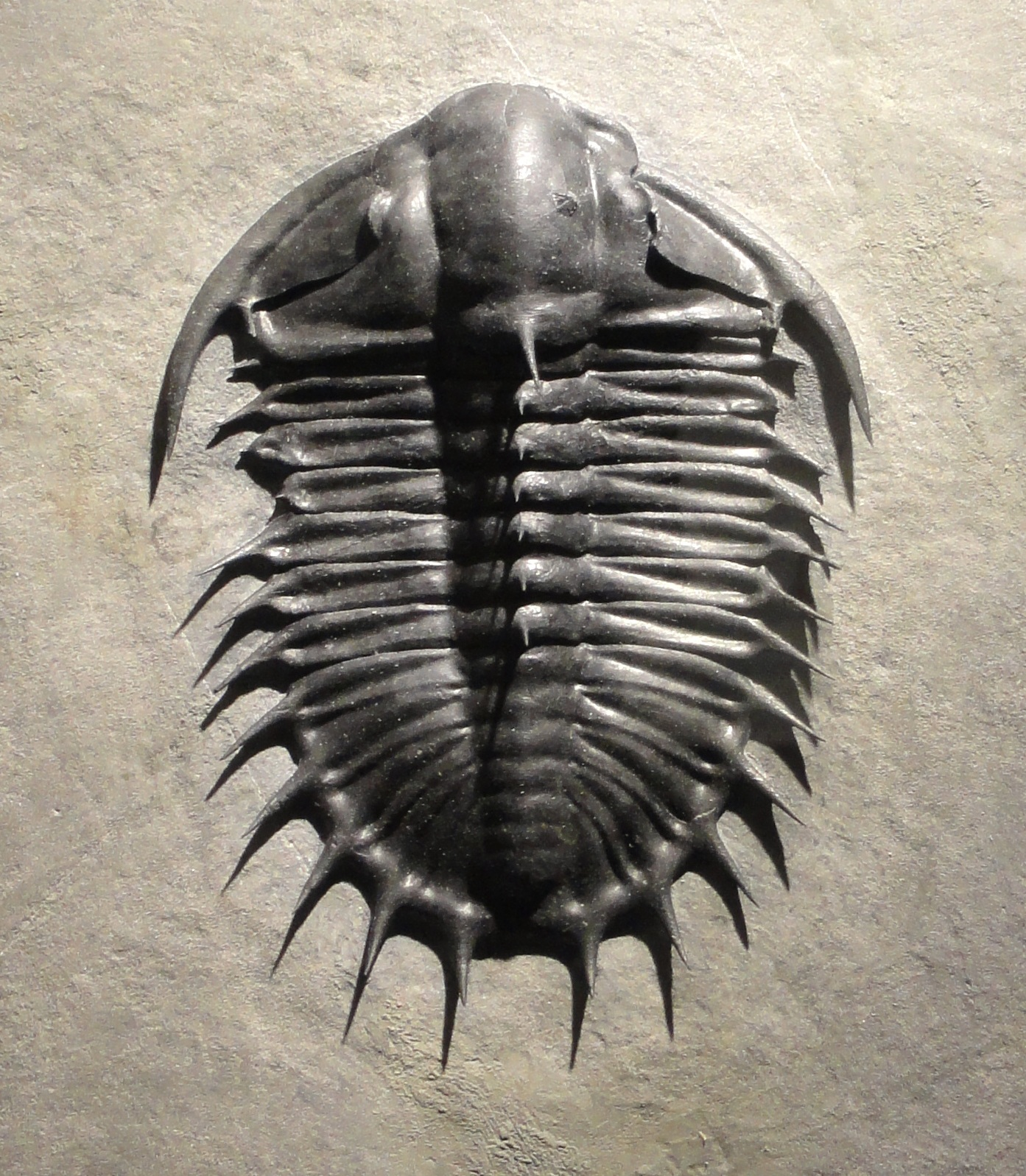
- Fossil of the Cambrian trilobite Olenoides
  †Olenoides
  - †Olenoides maladensis
- †Orbiculoidea
  - †Orbiculoidea missouriensis
  - †Orbiculoidea wyomingensis
- †Orbinaria
- †Orthograptus
  - †Orthograptus calcaratus
  - †Orthograptus pageanus
  - †Orthograptus quadrimucronatus
  - †Orthograptus truncatus
  - †Orthograptus whitfieldi
- †Orthoretiolites
  - †Orthoretiolites hami
- †Orthotetes
  - †Orthotetes kaskaskiensis
- †Orthotheca
  - †Orthotheca sola
- †Oryctocara – type locality for genus
  - †Oryctocara geikei
  - †Oryctocara geikiei – type locality for species
- †Oryctocare
- †Oryctocephalites
  - †Oryctocephalites typicalis – type locality for species
- †Oryctocephalus
  - †Oryctocephalus maladensis – type locality for species
  - †Oryctocephalus walcotti – type locality for species
- †Ovatia
- †Overtonia

== P ==
- †Pachyaspis
  - †Pachyaspis typicalis – type locality for species
- †Pachycranium
  - †Pachycranium faciclunis – type locality for species
- †Paenebeltella
  - †Paenebeltella vultulata – type locality for species
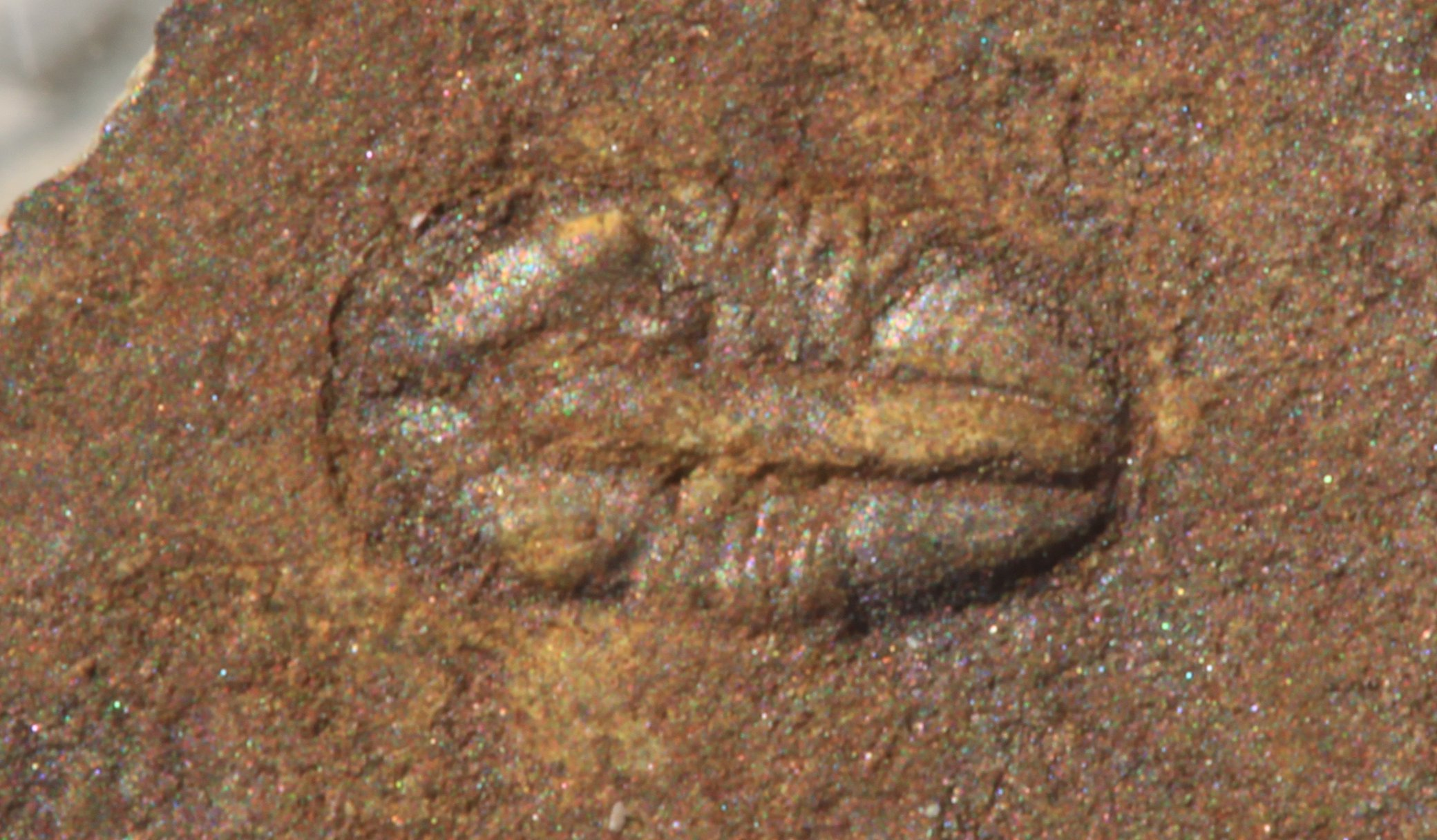
- Fossil of the Cambrian trilobite Pagetia
  †Pagetia
  - †Pagetia clytia
  - †Pagetia fossula – type locality for species
  - †Pagetia maladensis – type locality for species
  - †Pagetia rugosa
- †Palaeacis
  - †Palaeacis cuneiformis
- Palaeoaplysina
- †Palaeocoryne
- †Palaeoneilo
  - †Palaeoneilo mcchesneyana – type locality for species
- †Paleocoryne
- †Parahystricurus
  - †Parahystricurus carinatus – type locality for species
  - †Parahystricurus fraudator – type locality for species
  - †Parahystricurus oculirotundus – type locality for species
  - †Parahystricurus pustulosus – type locality for species
- †Paraorthograptus
  - †Paraorthograptus pacificus
- †Parisograptus
  - †Parisograptus caduceus
- †Paterina
  - †Paterina hirta – type locality for species
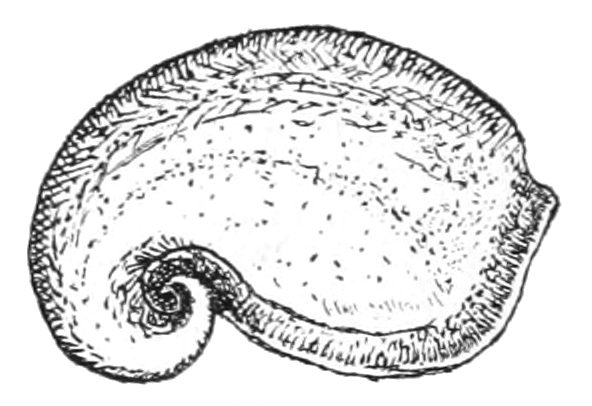
- Illustration of a fossilized shell in multiple views of the Paleozoic mollusc Pelagiella.
  †Pelagiella
- †Peltabellia
  - †Peltabellia peltabella – type locality for species
- †Peneckiella
- †Penniretepora
- †Pericyclus
  - †Pericyclus decipiens – type locality for species
- †Permastraea
  - †Permastraea solida
- †Peronopsis
  - †Peronopsis bonnerensis
- †Perrinites
  - †Perrinites hilli
- †Petalograptus
  - †Petalograptus minor
- †Petigurus – tentative report
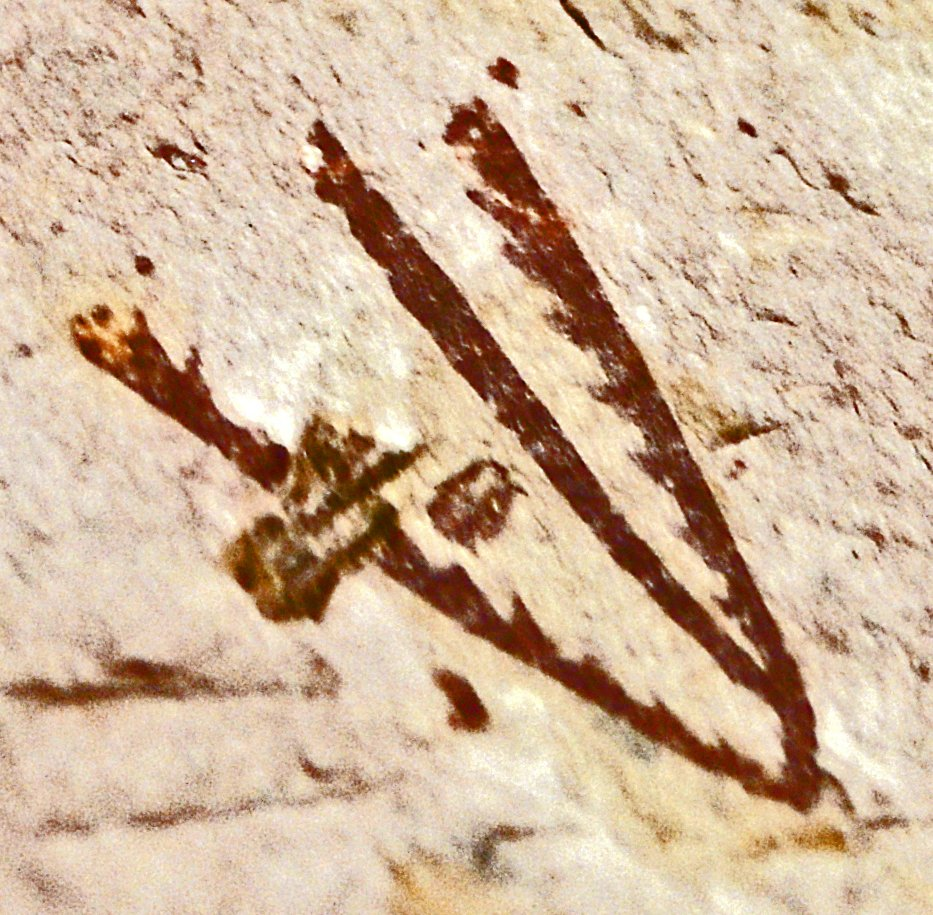
- Fossil of the Early Ordovician graptolite Phyllograptus
  †Phyllograptus
  - †Phyllograptus angustifolius
  - †Phyllograptus anna
  - †Phyllograptus ilicifolius
- †Pilekia – tentative report
- †Plaesiomys
  - †Plaesiomys subquadrata
- †Platyceras
- †Platycrinites
- †Platycrinus
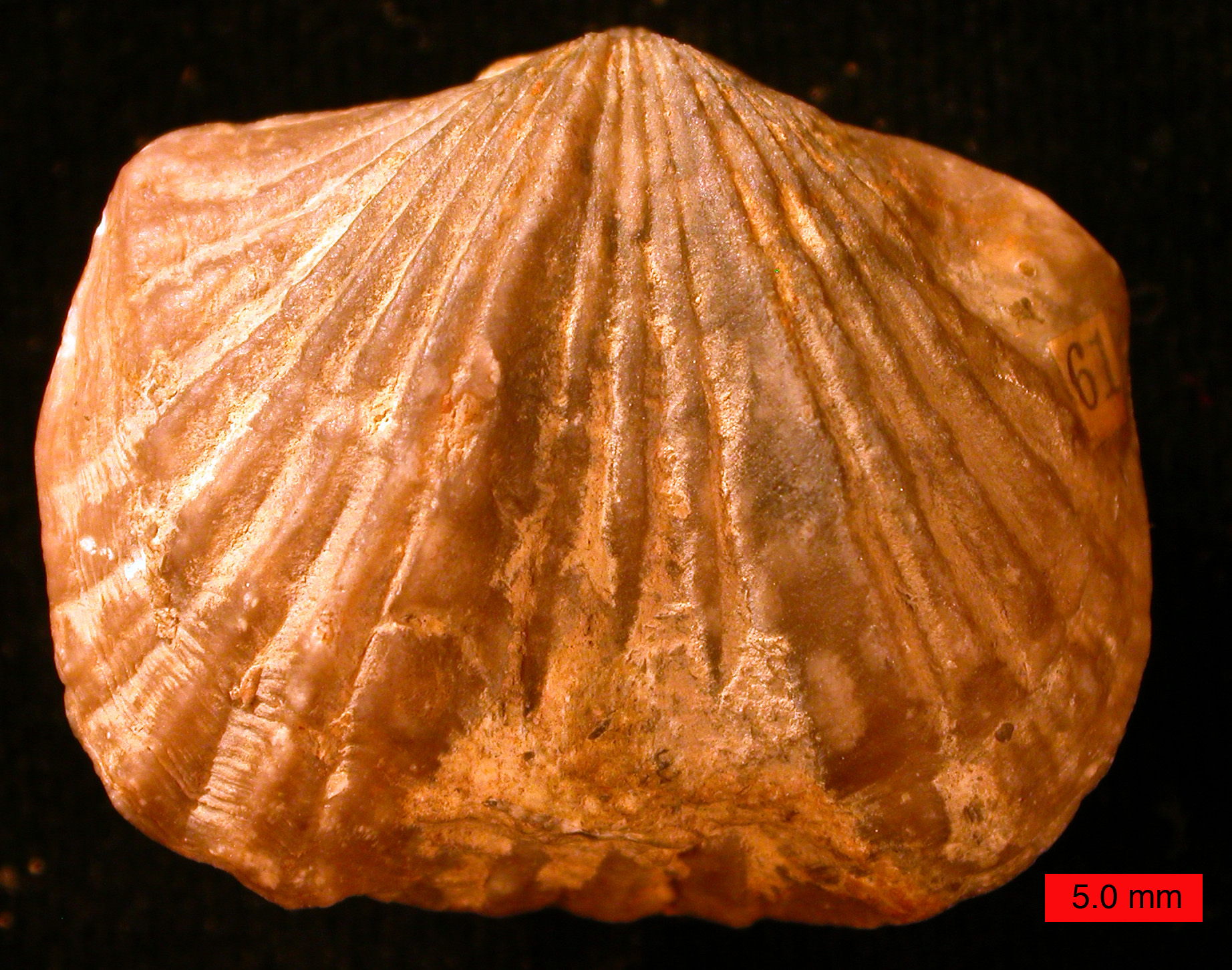
- Fossilized shell of the Middle Ordovician-Silurian brachiopod Platystrophia
  †Platystrophia
  - †Platystrophia equiconvexa – or unidentified comparable form
- †Pleurograptus
  - †Pleurograptus linearis
- †Polidevcia
  - †Polidevcia obesa
- †Poliella
  - †Poliella anteros
  - †Poliella caranus
- †Politicurus
  - †Politicurus politus – type locality for species
- †Polypora
- †Poulsenia
  - †Poulsenia granosa – type locality for species
  - †Poulsenia occidens – type locality for species
- †Primaspis
- †Prodentalium
  - †Prodentalium canna
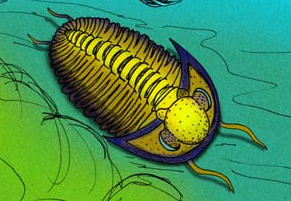
- Restoration of the Silurian trilobite Proetus
  †Proetus
- †Prolecanites – tentative report
  - †Prolecanites lyoni
- †Prospira
  - †Prospira albapinensis – or unidentified comparable form
- †Protoconchioides
  - †Protoconchioides douli – type locality for species
- †Protopliomerella
  - †Protopliomerella contracta
- †Protospongia
- †Prozacanthoides
  - †Prozacanthoides aequus – type locality for species
  - †Prozacanthoides alatus – type locality for species
  - †Prozacanthoides decorosus – type locality for species
  - †Prozacanthoides exilis – type locality for species
  - †Prozacanthoides optatus – type locality for species
- †Psalikilopsis
  - †Psalikilopsis cuspidicauda – type locality for species
- †Psalikilus
  - †Psalikilus typicum – type locality for species
- †Pseudagnostus
- †Pseudisograptus
  - †Pseudisograptus dumosus
- †Pseudobatostomella
  - †Pseudobatostomella decora
  - †Pseudobatostomella kamiensis
- †Pseudoclelandia
  - †Pseudoclelandia cornupsittaca – type locality for species
  - †Pseudoclelandia fluxafissura – type locality for species
  - †Pseudoclelandia lenisora – type locality for species
- †Pseudoclimacograptus
  - †Pseudoclimacograptus scharenbergi
- †Pseudocystophora
  - †Pseudocystophora complexa
- †Pseudodorlodotia
- †Pseudogastrioceras
- †Pseudohystricurus
  - †Pseudohystricurus obesus – type locality for species
  - †Pseudohystricurus orbus – type locality for species
  - †Pseudohystricurus rotundus – type locality for species
- †Pseudomonotis
- †Ptarmigania
  - †Ptarmigania agrestis – type locality for species
  - †Ptarmigania altilis – type locality for species
  - †Ptarmigania aurita – type locality for species
  - †Ptarmigania dignata – type locality for species
  - †Ptarmigania exigua – type locality for species
  - †Ptarmigania germana – type locality for species
  - †Ptarmigania natalis – type locality for species
  - †Ptarmigania ornata – type locality for species
  - †Ptarmigania sobrina – type locality for species
- †Ptychaspis
- †Pugnoides
  - †Pugnoides quinqueplecis
- †Punctospirifer
  - †Punctospirifer solidirostris
  - †Punctospirifer transversus
- †Pyraustocranium
  - †Pyraustocranium orbatum – type locality for species

== Q ==
- †Quadratia
  - †Quadratia hirsutiformis

== R ==
- †Rafinesquina – tentative report
- †Rasettia – tentative report
- †Rectograptus
  - †Rectograptus amplexicaulis
- †Remopleuridiella
  - †Remopleuridiella caudalimbata – type locality for species
- †Reteoeraotus
- †Reteograptus
  - †Reteograptus geinitzianus
  - †Reteograptus pulcherrimus – or unidentified comparable form
- †Reticulariina
  - †Reticulariina spinosa
- †Rhipidomella
  - †Rhipidomella arkansana
  - †Rhipidomella diminutiva
  - †Rhipidomella missouriensis
  - †Rhipidomella nevadensis
- †Rhombopora
- †Rhynchopora
  - †Rhynchopora taylori – type locality for species
- †Rhyncopora
- †Rhynoleichus
  - †Rhynoleichus weeksi
- †Rossaspis
  - †Rossaspis superciliosa – type locality for species
- †Rossicurus
- †Rotopericyclus
  - †Rotopericyclus pinyonensis – type locality for species
- †Rugosochonetes
  - †Rugosochonetes loganensis – or unidentified comparable form
- †Ruzhencevia
  - †Ruzhencevia incrustata
- †Rylstonia

== S ==
- †Sanguinolites
  - †Sanguinolites carbonaria – type locality for species
- †Saratogia
- †Scaphellina – tentative report
- †Schistometopus – type locality for genus
  - †Schistometopus typicalis – type locality for species
- †Schizodus
  - †Schizodus bifidus
  - †Schizodus ferrieri – type locality for species
- †Schizograptus
- †Schizophoria
  - †Schizophoria depressa
  - †Schizophoria poststriatula – or unidentified comparable form
  - †Schizophoria resupinata
- †Schuchertella
- †Scinocephalus
  - †Scinocephalus quadrihastatus – type locality for species
  - †Scinocephalus solitecti – type locality for species
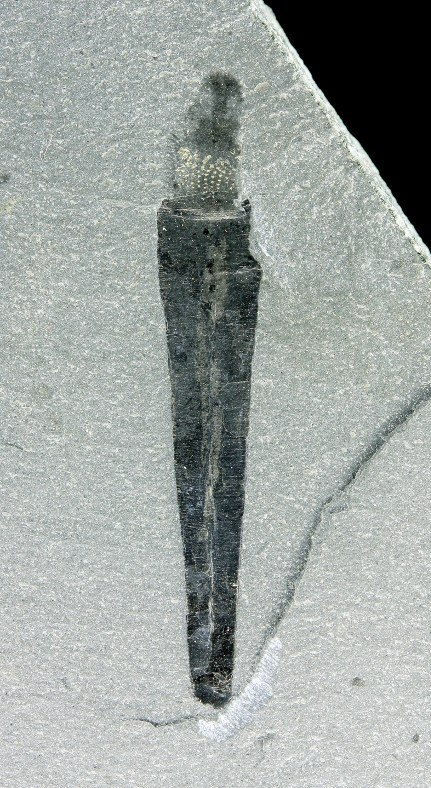
- Fossil of the Cambrian priapulid worm Selkirkia
  †Selkirkia
  - †Selkirkia spencei
- †Septopora
- †Setigerites
- †Shamovella
- †Siphonodendron
- †Spencia
  - †Spencia plena
- †Sphenosteges
- †Spirifer
  - †Spirifer albertensis
  - †Spirifer bifurcatus
  - †Spirifer biplicoides
  - †Spirifer brazerianus
  - †Spirifer forbesi
  - †Spirifer osagensis
  - †Spirifer pellaensis
  - †Spirifer rowleyi
- †Spiriferina
- †Spirolegoceras – type locality for genus
  - †Spirolegoceras fischeri – type locality for species
- †Stacheoceras
  - †Stacheoceras sexlobatum – type locality for species
- †Stachyodes
- †Stauroholcus
  - †Stauroholcus typicalis
- †Stenoconites – type locality for genus
  - †Stenoconites idahoensis – type locality for species
- †Stenolobulites
  - †Stenolobulites simulator – type locality for species
  - †Stenolobulites sinuosus – type locality for species
- †Stenopora
  - †Stenopora grandis
- †Straparollus
  - †Straparollus ophirensis
- †Stratifera
  - †Stratifera brazeriana
- †Streblochondria
- †Streblopteria
  - †Streblopteria montpelierensis – type locality for species
- †Striatifera
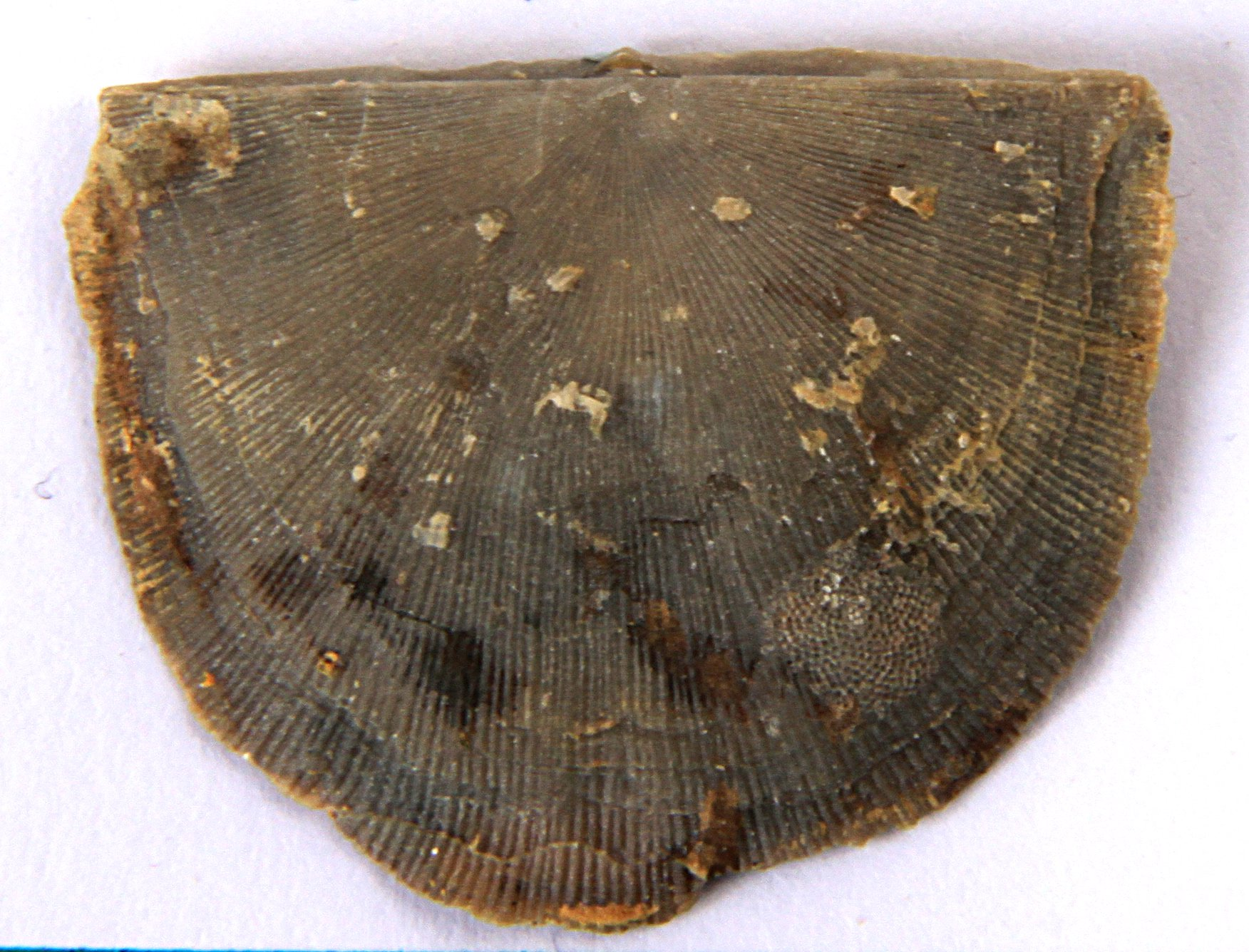
- Fossilized shell of the Ordovician-Silurian brachiopod Strophomena
  †Strophomena
- †Subglobosochonetes
  - †Subglobosochonetes norquayensis
- †Sulcoretepora
- †Symphysurina
  - †Symphysurina illaenoides
- †Syntrophopsis
  - †Syntrophopsis polita – or unidentified comparable form
  - †Syntrophopsis transversa
- †Syringopora
  - †Syringopora surcularia
  - †Syringopora surcularis

== T ==
- †Tabantaloceras
- †Tabulipora
- †Taenicephalina
- †Taenicephalus
- †Tesselacauda
  - †Tesselacauda depressa – type locality for species
- †Tetracamera
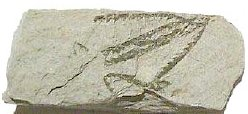
- Fossils of the Early-Late Ordovician graptolite Tetragraptus
  †Tetragraptus
  - †Tetragraptus amii
  - †Tetragraptus pseudobigsbyi
  - †Tetragraptus quadribrachiatus
- †Tetralobula – tentative report
- †Tetraporinus
- †Tetrataxis
- †Thamnopora
- †Thoracocare
  - †Thoracocare minuta
- †Timaniella
  - †Timaniella pseudocamerata
- †Toernquistia – tentative report
- †Tonkinella
  - †Tonkinella idahoensis – type locality for species
- †Torynifer
  - †Torynifer cooperensis
  - †Torynifer pseudolineata
- †Trigonocerca
  - †Trigonocerca typica
- †Triticites
- †Tritoechia
- †Tschussovskenia
  - †Tschussovskenia connorsensis

== U ==
- †Unispirifer
  - †Unispirifer minnewankensis
- †Urotheca
  - †Urotheca sampsoni – type locality for species
- †Utia
  - †Utia curio

== V ==
- †Vanuxemella
  - †Vanuxemella idahoensis – type locality for species
- †Vesiculophyllum
- †Vistoia – tentative report
  - †Vistoia minuta
- †Vnigripecten
  - †Vnigripecten phosphaticus

== W ==
- †Werriea
  - †Werriea australis
- †Wilbernia
- †Wilkingia
  - †Wilkingia walkeri
- †Wilsonastraea
  - †Wilsonastraea smithi
- †Wimanella
  - †Wimanella maladensis – type locality for species
  - †Wimanella nautes
  - †Wimanella rara
  - †Wimanella spencei
- †Worthenia – tentative report

== X ==
- †Xenostegium
  - †Xenostegium franklinense – type locality for species
  - †Xenostegium taurus

== Y ==
- †Yakovlevia
  - †Yakovlevia geniculata – type locality for species
  - †Yakovlevia multistriatus

== Z ==
- †Zacanthoides
  - †Zacanthoides abbreviatus
  - †Zacanthoides adjunctus
  - †Zacanthoides gradatus
  - †Zacanthoides holopygous
  - †Zacanthoides holopygus
  - †Zacanthoides idahoensis – type locality for species
  - †Zacanthoides sampsoni – type locality for species
  - †Zacanthoides serratus
- †Zaphrenthis – report made of unidentified related form or using admittedly obsolete nomenclature
  - †Zaphrenthis compressus
- †Zaphrentites
  - †Zaphrentites spinulosus
- †Zygospira
  - †Zygospira circularis – or unidentified comparable form
  - †Zygospira lebanonensis – or unidentified comparable form
