= Pustulinae =

Pustulinae Temporal range: Tournaisian–Visean

Scientific classification
- Domain: Eukaryota
- Kingdom: Animalia
- Phylum: Brachiopoda
- Class: †Strophomenata
- Order: †Productida
- Family: †Echinoconchidae
- Subfamily: †Pustulinae; Waterhouse, 1981

Subgroups
- ?Etheridgina; Pustula; Scutepustula; ?Septarinia

Subfamily of marine lamp shells

Pustulinae is an extinct subfamily of medium to large-sized brachiopods which lived during the Early Carboniferous period in marine habitats. It is named after the type genus Pustula.

== Taxonomy ==
The exact evolutionary relationships of Pustulinae relative to other groups of the suborder Productidina have been a matter of extensive debate throughout much of the 20th Century, primarily due to the three genera Buxtonia, Pustula and Juresania (with the debate later expanded to their families and subfamilies) shifting in position repeatedly between phylogenies and classifications. The emphasis on internal versus external characters to determine the systematics of these groups has largely been responsible for this: the original Treatise on Invertebrate Paleontology published in 1965 placed emphasis on internal characters (including the cardinal process) as diagnostic, whereas the 2000 revision primarily used external features and shell shape, resulting in differing classification of these clades.

More recently, Leighton & Maples (2002) conducted multiple phylogenetic analyses which are strongly in agreement that the four subfamilies Buxtoniinae, Echinoconchinae, Pustulinae and Juresaniinae form the family Echinoconchidae. The results of their phylogenetic analyses are displayed in the cladogram below:

- Productella
- - - Praewaagenoconcha
    - Sentosia
  - - Leioproductus
    - - - Spinocarinifera
        - - Diaphragmus
          - Antiquatonia
      - - - Flexaria
          - Buxtonia
        - - Pustula
          - - Echinoconchus
            - - Echinaria
              - - Pulchratia
                - Parajuresania
