= Waagenoconcha =

Waagenoconcha Temporal range: Carboniferous–Permian

Scientific classification
- Kingdom: Animalia
- Phylum: Brachiopoda
- Class: †Strophomenata
- Order: †Productida
- Family: †Echinoconchidae
- Genus: †Waagenoconcha; Chao, 1927

Species
- Waagenoconcha abnakensis Fantini Sestini, 1966; Waagenoconcha angustata Sarytcheva, 1984; Waagenoconcha asiatica Zawodowsky, 1968; Waagenoconcha bhalensis Waagen, 1884; Waagenoconcha convexa Cooper and Grant, 1975; Waagenoconcha cylindricus Waagen, 1884; Waagenoconcha elegantula Lee and Gu, 1980; Waagenoconcha gangetica Diener, 1897; Waagenoconcha humboldti d'Orbigny, 1842; Waagenoconcha impercepta Manankov, 1991; Waagenoconcha imperfecta Prendergast, 1935; Waagenoconcha irginae Stuckenberg, 1898; Waagenoconcha irginaeformis Stepanov, 1937; Waagenoconcha krystofovichi Fredericks, 1925; Waagenoconcha leonardensis King, 1931; Waagenoconcha magnifica Cooper and Grant, 1975; Waagenoconcha omanica Yanagida and Pillevuit, 1994; Waagenoconcha parvispinosa Cooper, 1957; Waagenoconcha payeri Toula, 1873; Waagenoconcha peregoedovi Makoshin, 2022; Waagenoconcha permocarbonica Ustritsky, 1963; Waagenoconcha piassinaensis Einor, 1939; Waagenoconcha platys Cooper and Grant, 1975; Waagenoconcha prophetica Cooper and Grant, 1975; Waagenoconcha punctulata Lee and Gu, 1980; Waagenoconcha serialis Waagen, 1884; Waagenoconcha subpermocarbonica Lee and Gu, 1980; Waagenoconcha sulcata Cooper and Grant, 1975; Waagenoconcha tastubensis Tschernyschew, 1902; Waagenoconcha tumenlingensis Lee and Gu, 1980; Waagenoconcha vagans Reed, 1932; Waagenoconcha waageni Rothpletz, 1892; Waagenoconcha wardlawi Waterhouse and Chen, 2007; Waagenoconcha wimani Fredericks 1934

Extinct genus of brachiopod

Waagenoconcha is an extinct genus of echinoconchid brachiopod that lived during the Carboniferous and Permian periods.

== Palaeobiology ==
=== Life history ===
During its juvenile stage of ontogeny, Waagenoconcha abichi had its shell attach itself to a foreign object. During the adult stage of life history, W. abichi lay in a sedimentary substrate with its ventral valve positioned downwards. Its corona of spines around the visceral disc anchored it and functioned as a baffle that trapped sediment that then banked around the shell. The spines also had an effect similar to a snowshoe, helping the brachiopod to avoid sinking too far into the substrate.
