= Productus subaculeatus =

Productus subaculeatus Temporal range: 388.1–360.7 Ma

Scientific classification
- Domain: Eukaryota
- Kingdom: Animalia
- Phylum: Brachiopoda
- Class: †Strophomenata
- Order: †Productida
- Family: †Productidae
- Genus: †Productus
- Species: †P. subaculeatus

Binomial name
- †Productus subaculeatus Murchison, 1840

Synonyms
- Productella subaculeata (Murchison, 1840)

Extinct species of marine lamp shell

Productus subaculeatus is an extinct species of brachiopods. Its fossils are present in the Devonian.
