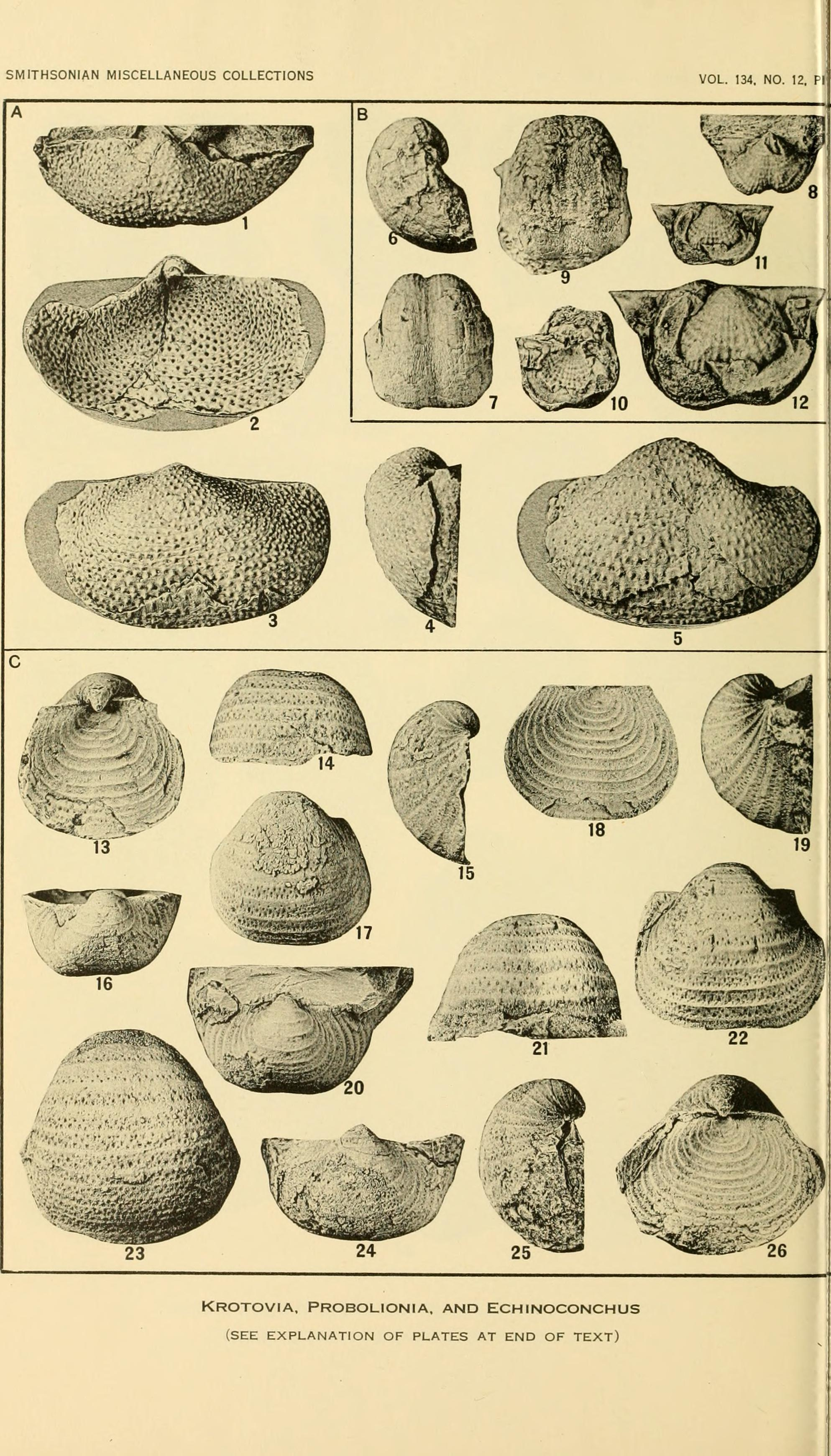
- Fossils of the echinoconchid Echinoconchus (13-26) along with other brachiopods

Scientific classification
- Kingdom: Animalia
- Phylum: Brachiopoda
- Class: †Strophomenata
- Order: †Productida
- Superfamily: †Echinoconchoidea
- Family: †Echinoconchidae; Stehli, 1954

Subfamilies
- Buxtoniinae; Echinoconchinae; Juresaniinae; Pustulinae

= Echinoconchidae =

Echinoconchidae Temporal range: Tournaisian–Upper Permian

Family of marine lamp shells

Echinoconchidae is an extinct family of brachiopods which lived from the Lower Carboniferous to Upper Permian periods in marine habitats. Currently, four subfamilies are assigned to it, though the evolutionary relationships between them and the family Productidae have been heavily debated for the better part of the 20th Century.

== Taxonomic history ==
The exact evolutionary relationships of Echinoconchidae as well as which groups belong to this family have been a matter of extensive debate throughout much of the 20th Century, primarily due to the three genera Buxtonia, Pustula and Juresania (with the debate later expanded to their families and subfamilies) shifting in position repeatedly between phylogenies and classifications. The emphasis on internal versus external characters to determine the systematics of these groups has largely been responsible for this: the original Treatise on Invertebrate Paleontology published in 1965 placed emphasis on internal characters (including the cardinal process) as diagnostic, whereas the 2000 revision primarily used external features and shell shape, resulting in differing classification of these clades.

More recently, Leighton & Maples (2002) conducted multiple phylogenetic analyses which are strongly in agreement that Buxtoniinae and Juresaniinae belong in Echinoconchidae rather than Productidae, and that the genus Setigerites (historically placed in Buxtoniinae) has features of both productids and echinoconchids, potentially being related to the common ancestor of the two families. The cladogram results of their phylogenetic analyses are displayed in the cladogram below:

- Productella
- - - Praewaagenoconcha
    - Sentosia
  - - Leioproductus
    - - - Spinocarinifera
        - - Diaphragmus
          - Antiquatonia
      - - - Flexaria
          - Buxtonia
        - - Pustula
          - - Echinoconchus
            - - Echinaria
              - - Pulchratia
                - Parajuresania

== Description ==
Echinoconchids had a corpus with a deep cavity and planoconvex profile, and the dorsal trail is often short. Thin, recumbent spines are present on the shell, commonly arranged in concentric bands. The cardinal process could be bifid, quadrifid or weakly trifid, with a shaft present in adult specimens. The quadripartite is scarred by brachial valve adductor muscle, which was anterio-medially positioned.
