= Pulchratia =

Pulchratia Temporal range: Kasimovian–Gzhelian

Scientific classification
- Domain: Eukaryota
- Kingdom: Animalia
- Phylum: Brachiopoda
- Class: †Strophomenata
- Order: †Productida
- Family: †Echinoconchidae
- Tribe: †Juresaniini
- Genus: †Pulchratia; Muir-Wood & Cooper 1960

Species
- †P. picuris Sutherland & Harlow; †P. pustulosa Sutherland & Harlow

Genus of marine lamp shells

Pulchratia is an extinct genus of brachiopods which lived in marine habitats during the Upper Carboniferous period. Its fossils have been found in North America.

== Description ==
Like other echinoconchids, Pulchratia had recumbent spines arranged in irregular concentric bands, with the spines of this genus being mostly uniform in size and not having strong bases. It also has long lateral ridges which diverge from the hinge line. In these conditions it differs from the related Parajuresania, which has thicker posterior spines than anterior spines, and short cardinal ridges that parallel the hinge line, but otherwise the two genera are very similar. The buttress plates of Pulchratia are convergent, weak or entirely lost in adult specimens, while the lateral ridges are slightly divergent from the hinge.

== Distribution ==
Fossil remains of Pulchratia are not known outside of North America, suggesting the genus may have been endemic to the continent. Remains of Pulchratia picuris have been found in the Watahomigi Formation of Arizona, and those of Pulchratia symmetrica are known from the Graham Formation of Texas and Mattoon Formation of Illinois. Fossils from the Holder Formation of New Mexico have been assigned to Pulchratia aff. meeki. Specimens attributed to Pulchratia sp. have been collected from the Four Corners, Sausbee, and Takhandit formations of Kentucky, Oklahoma and Alaska respectively.

== Classification ==
Muir-Wood & Cooper (1960) placed Pulchratia in the subfamily Echinoconchinae as they believed it lacked buttress plates. However Lazarev (1982) noted that the genus did indeed possess buttress plates as a juvenile at least, and transferred it into Juresaniinae. Leighton & Maples (2002) conducted multiple phylogenetic analyses which are strongly in agreement that the four subfamilies Buxtoniinae, Echinoconchinae, Pustulinae and Juresaniinae form the family Echinoconchidae, with Juresaniinae represented by Pulchratia and Parajuresania. The cladogram results of their phylogenetic analyses are displayed in the cladogram below:

- Productella
- - - Praewaagenoconcha
    - Sentosia
  - - Leioproductus
    - - - Spinocarinifera
        - - Diaphragmus
          - Antiquatonia
      - - - Flexaria
          - Buxtonia
        - - Pustula
          - - Echinoconchus
            - - Echinaria
              - - Pulchratia
                - Parajuresania
