= Diaphragmus =

Diaphragmus Temporal range: Carboniferous-Permian ~336–254 Ma

Scientific classification
- Domain: Eukaryota
- Kingdom: Animalia
- Phylum: Brachiopoda
- Class: †Strophomenata
- Order: †Productida
- Family: †Productidae
- Tribe: †Productini
- Genus: †Diaphragmus; Girty 1910

Species
- See text

Extinct genus of brachiopod

Diaphragmus is an extinct genus of brachiopod belonging to the order Productida and family Linoproductidae. Specimens have been found in Carboniferous beds in North America.

== Classification ==
Leighton & Maples (2002) conducted multiple phylogenetic analyses which are strongly in agreement that the four subfamilies Buxtoniinae, Echinoconchinae, Pustulinae and Juresaniinae form the family Echinoconchidae. The results of their phylogenetic analyses are displayed in the cladogram below:

- Productella
- - - Praewaagenoconcha
    - Sentosia
  - - Leioproductus
    - - - Spinocarinifera
        - - Diaphragmus
          - Antiquatonia
      - - - Flexaria
          - Buxtonia
        - - Pustula
          - - Echinoconchus
            - - Echinaria
              - - Pulchratia
                - Parajuresania

== Species ==
- D. elegans Norwood and Pratten
- D. nivosus Gordon 1975
