= Pustula (brachiopod) =

Pustula Temporal range: Visean

Scientific classification
- Domain: Eukaryota
- Kingdom: Animalia
- Phylum: Brachiopoda
- Class: †Strophomenata
- Order: †Productida
- Family: †Echinoconchidae
- Subfamily: †Pustulinae
- Genus: †Pustula; Thomas, 1914

Genus of marine lamp shells

Pustula is an extinct genus of brachiopods which lived during the Carboniferous period. It is the type genus of the subfamily Pustulinae. Its fossils have been found in Eurasia, North America and northern Africa.

== Description ==
Members of the genus Pustula had a subrectangular outline with a weak ventral sulcus, minimal trails and dorsal median folds. Like other echinoconchids, they had recumbent spines arranged in irregular concentric bands, with Pustula having elongated spine bases and weak spine differentiation. The dorsal face of this brachiopod was trifid, and the cardinal process was narrow. Marginal ridges and cardinal process pits are absent in this genus, while the cardinal ridges diminished towards the ears.

== Classification ==
Brunton et al. (1995) deemed Pustula to be a primitive member of the Echinoconchidae family, a placement also supported by Muir-Wood & Cooper (1960). Leighton & Maples (2002) conducted multiple phylogenetic analyses which are strongly in agreement that the four subfamilies Buxtoniinae, Echinoconchinae, Pustulinae and Juresaniinae form the family Echinoconchidae. The cladogram results of their phylogenetic analyses are displayed in the cladogram below:

- Productella
- - - Praewaagenoconcha
    - Sentosia
  - - Leioproductus
    - - - Spinocarinifera
        - - Diaphragmus
          - Antiquatonia
      - - - Flexaria
          - Buxtonia
        - - Pustula
          - - Echinoconchus
            - - Echinaria
              - - Pulchratia
                - Parajuresania
