= Echinaria (brachiopod) =

Echinaria Temporal range: Gzhelian–Lower Permian

Scientific classification
- Kingdom: Animalia
- Phylum: Brachiopoda
- Class: †Strophomenata
- Order: †Productida
- Family: †Echinoconchidae
- Tribe: †Echinoconchini
- Genus: †Echinaria; Muir-Wood & Cooper, 1960

Genus of marine lamp shells

Echinaria is an extinct genus of brachiopods which lived during the Upper Carboniferous and Lower Permian periods. Its fossils have been found in Eurasia, North America and northern South America.

== Description ==
Like other echinoconchids, Echinaria had thin, recumbent spines arranged in concentric bands on both valves, as well as a corpus with a planoconvex profile and deep cavity. Members of this genus had cardinal ridges and an elongated outline which widened anteriorly. Echinaria are medium to large-sized echinoconchids, and while notably larger than Echinoconchus, many similarities are observed between the two genera and they are placed in the same subfamily.

== Classification ==
Leighton & Maples (2002) conducted multiple phylogenetic analyses which are strongly in agreement that the four subfamilies Buxtoniinae, Echinoconchinae, Pustulinae and Juresaniinae form the family Echinoconchidae. The cladogram results of their phylogenetic analyses are displayed in the cladogram below:

- Productella
- - - Praewaagenoconcha
    - Sentosia
  - - Leioproductus
    - - - Spinocarinifera
        - - Diaphragmus
          - Antiquatonia
      - - - Flexaria
          - Buxtonia
        - - Pustula
          - - Echinoconchus
            - - Echinaria
              - - Pulchratia
                - Parajuresania
