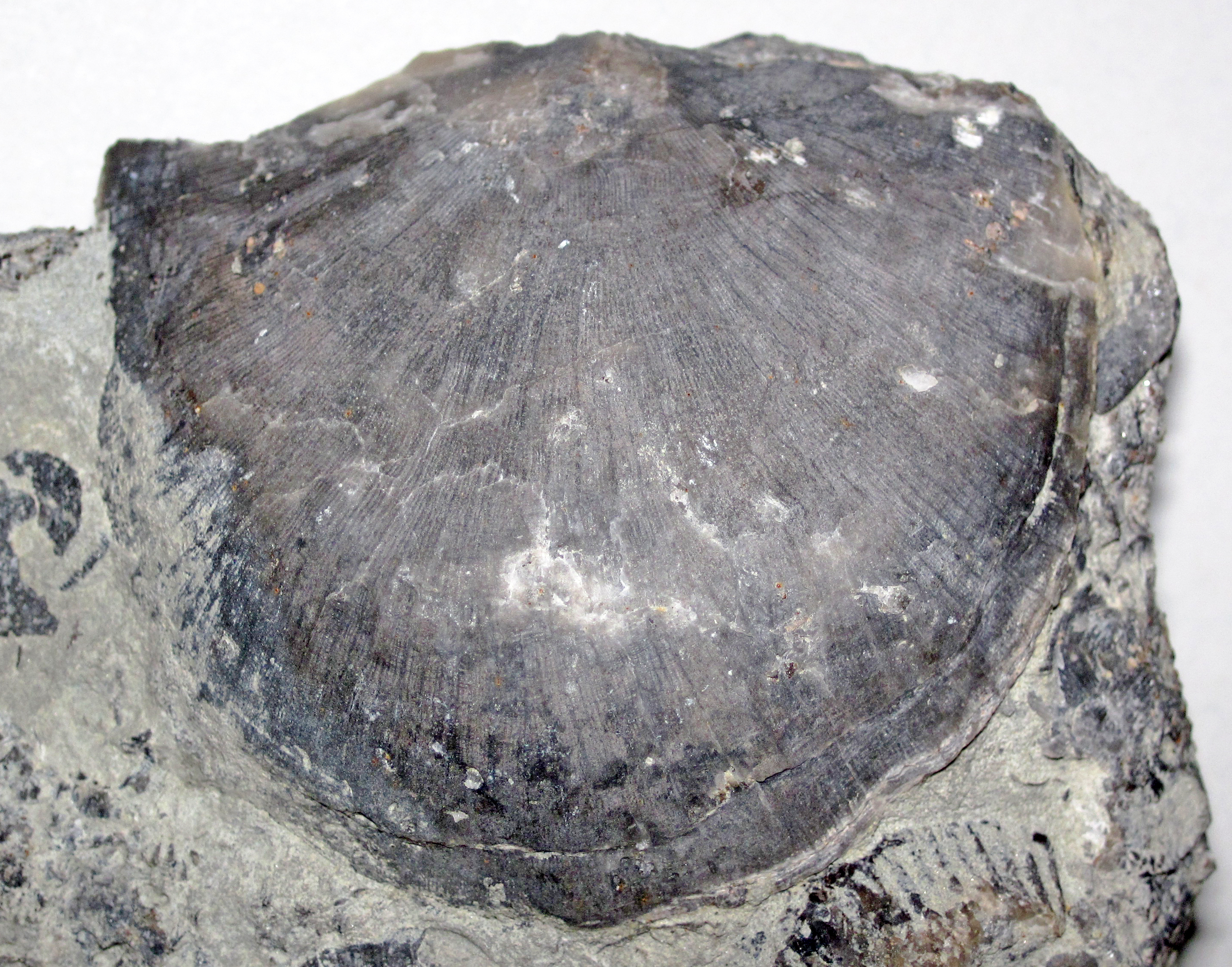
- Rafinesquina ponderosa from the Excello South Outcrop near the Ohio-Kentucky-Indiana tristate area

Scientific classification
- Kingdom: Animalia
- Phylum: Brachiopoda
- Class: †Strophomenata
- Order: †Strophomenida
- Family: †Rafinesquinidae
- Subfamily: †Rafinesquininae
- Genus: †Rafinesquina; Clarke and Hall, 1892

Type species
- Leptaena alternata Conrad, 1838

Species
- See Species

= Rafinesquina =

Rafinesquina Temporal range: Darriwilian–Ludlow

Genus of paleozoic brachiopods

Rafinesquina is an extinct genus of large brachiopod that existed from the Darriwilian to the Ludlow epoch.

The genus was named in honor of polymath Constantine Samuel Rafinesque-Schmaltz.

== Description ==
Rafinesquina's members were epifaunal, meaning they lived on top of the seafloor, not buried within it, and were suspension feeders. Rafinesquina normally have a concavo-convex profile, with radiating striae of alternating size which are crossed with finer concentric striae. Their width is usually greater than their length, like most Strophomenids. Members of this genus had shells that grew in increments, with each increment forming a layer of the shell (much like trees do with their rings). In 1982, Gary D. Rosenberg analyzed specimens of Rafinesquina alternata previously inferred to have lived in a shallow subtidal environment and proposed it could be possible to estimate the total number of days in a lunar month (the period between full moons) during the Late Ordovician using layer counting.

== Distribution ==
Rafinesquina specimens had a cosmopolitan distribution, and their fossils can be found in the Americas, Europe, and Asia.

== Species ==
Species in the genus Rafinesquina include:

- R. alternata (Conrad, 1838)
- R. declivis (James, 1874)
- R. delicata Williams, 1974
- R. deltoidea (Conrad, 1838)
- R. insidiosa Williams, 1962
- R. jeffersonensis Bradley, 1930
- R. latisculptilus (Savage, 1913)
- R. lignani Vilas, 1985
- R. mesicosta Shumard, 1860
- R. mucronata Foerste, 1914
- R. nasuta (Emmons, 1842)
- R. oanduensis Oraspold, 1956
- R. orvikui Oraspold, 1956
- R. percensis Cooper and Kindle, 1936
- R. planulata Cooper, 1956
- R. ponderosa Hayes and Ulrich, 1903
- R. pseudoloricata (Barrande, 1848)
- R. relicula Benedetto, 1995
- R. stropheodontoides (Savage, 1913)
- R. trentonensis (Hall, 1847)
- R. ultrix Marek and Havlíček, 1967
- R. urbicola Marek and Havlíček, 1967
