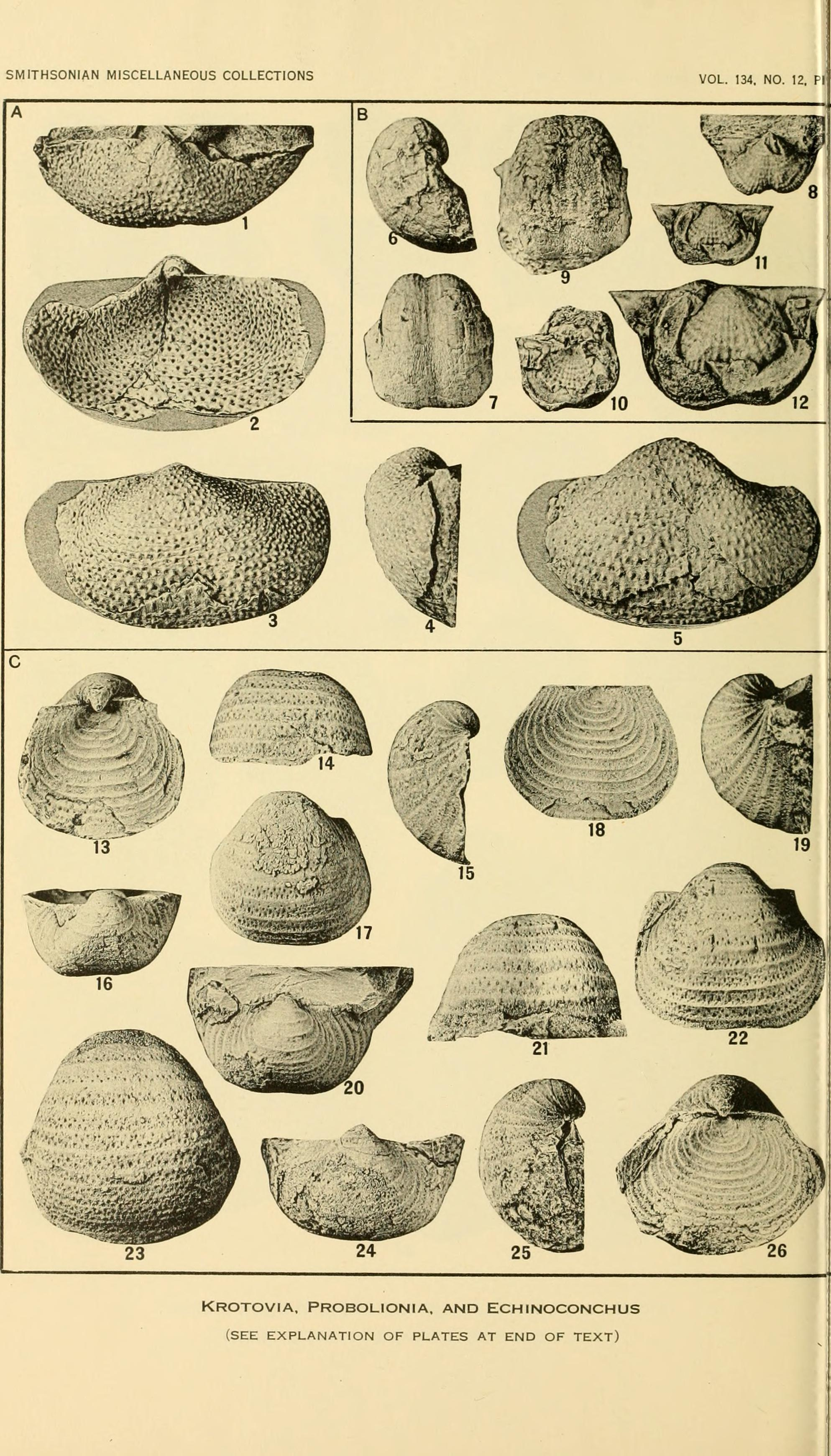
- Fossils of Echinoconchus (13-26) along with other brachiopods

Scientific classification
- Kingdom: Animalia
- Phylum: Brachiopoda
- Class: †Strophomenata
- Order: †Productida
- Family: †Echinoconchidae
- Tribe: †Echinoconchini
- Genus: †Echinoconchus; Weller, 1914

= Echinoconchus =

Echinoconchus Temporal range: Visean

Genus of marine lamp shells

Echinoconchus is an extinct genus of brachiopods which lived during the Lower Carboniferous period. The genus was abundant and had a cosmopolitan distribution.

== Description ==
Like other echinoconchids, Echinoconchus had thin, recumbent spines arranged in concentric bands on both valves, as well as a corpus with a planoconvex profile and deep cavity. This genus had a transversely subcircular outline, weakly concave dorsal valve and short dorsal trail. Ridges supporting the narrow cardinal process are present, as well as elongated, mildly anteriorly-raised adductor muscle scars.

== Classification ==
Leighton & Maples (2002) conducted multiple phylogenetic analyses which are strongly in agreement that the four subfamilies Buxtoniinae, Echinoconchinae, Pustulinae and Juresaniinae form the family Echinoconchidae. The cladogram results of their phylogenetic analyses are displayed in the cladogram below:

- Productella
- - - Praewaagenoconcha
    - Sentosia
  - - Leioproductus
    - - - Spinocarinifera
        - - Diaphragmus
          - Antiquatonia
      - - - Flexaria
          - Buxtonia
        - - Pustula
          - - Echinoconchus
            - - Echinaria
              - - Pulchratia
                - Parajuresania
