= Productidina =

Scientific classification
- Domain: Eukaryota
- Kingdom: Animalia
- Phylum: Brachiopoda
- Class: †Strophomenata
- Order: †Productida
- Suborder: †Productidina

Extinct suborder of brachiopods

Productidina is a suborder of brachiopods containing the families:

- Superfamily Productoidea
  - Family Productellidae
  - Family Productidae
- Superfamily Echinoconchoidea
  - Family Echinoconchidae
  - Family Sentosiidae
- Superfamily Linoproductoidea
  - Family Linoproductidae
  - Family Monticuliferidae
  - Family Shrenkiellidae
