= Juresania =

Juresania Temporal range: Carboniferous-Permian

Scientific classification
- Kingdom: Animalia
- Phylum: Brachiopoda
- Class: †Strophomenata
- Order: †Productida
- Family: †Echinoconchidae
- Tribe: †Juresaniini
- Genus: †Juresania (Fredericks, 1928)

Species
- See Species

Genus of paleozoic brachiopods

Juresania is an extinct genus of brachiopod that existed from the Carboniferous to the Permian.

== Description ==
Juresania's members were epifaunal, meaning they lived on top of the seafloor, not buried within it, and were suspension feeders. They had small spines that cover both halves of the shell.

== Distribution ==
Juresania specimens can be found in the Americas, Europe, and Asia, with most Juresania specimens having been found in the Northern Hemisphere.

== Species ==
Species in the genus Juresania include:

- J. dorudensis Fantini Sestini, 1965
- J. grandispinosa Li, 1986
- J. hispida Chronic, 1949
- J. juresanensis (Tschernyschew, 1902)
- J. kolymaensis Zavodowsky, 1968
- J. omanensis Hudson & Sudbury, 1959
- J. ovalis (Dunbar & Condra, 1932)
- J. rectangularia?
- J. rituensis Sun, 1983
- J. scalaris (Mansuy, 1913)
- J. transversa Sun, 1991
- J. tuotalaensis Sun, 1983
