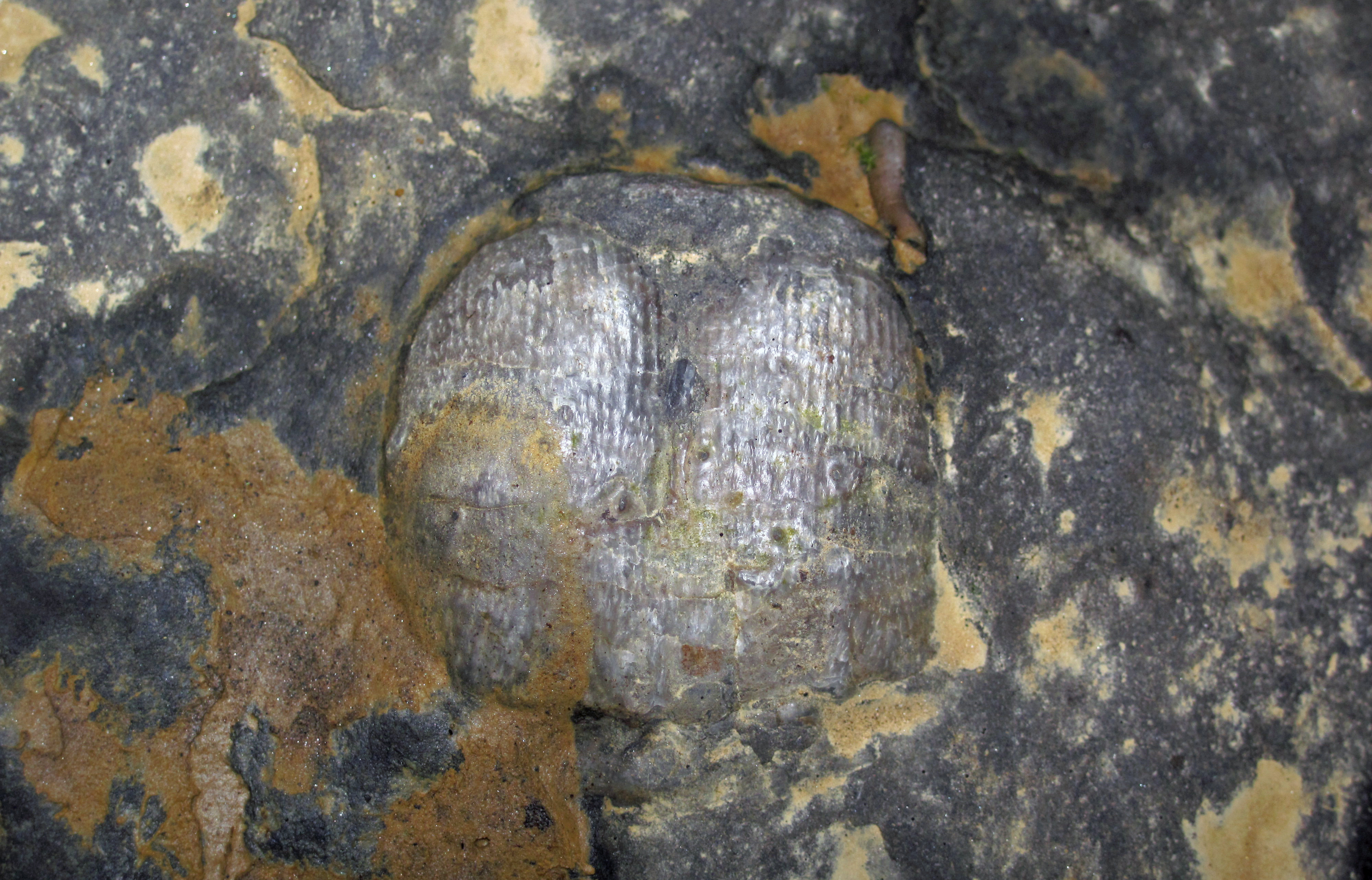
- Fossil from the Boggs Shale

Scientific classification
- Domain: Eukaryota
- Kingdom: Animalia
- Phylum: Brachiopoda
- Class: †Strophomenata
- Order: †Productida
- Family: †Productidae
- Tribe: †Retariini
- Genus: †Antiquatonia; Miloradovich, 1945

Species
- List: A. blackwelderi (Gordon) A. coloradoensis (Girty) A. cooperi (Shi, 1990) A. costata (Sowerby, 1827) A. inflativentra (Cooper & Grant, 1975) A. insculpta (Muir-Wood, 1930) A. jemezensis (Harlow & Sutherland) A. pernodosa (Easton, 1962) A. portlockianus (Norwood & Pratten, 1855) A. posthindi (Solomina, 1970) A. reticulata (Cooper, 1957)

= Antiquatonia =

Antiquatonia Temporal range: Visean–Serpukhovian

Extinct genus of brachiopod

Antiquatonia is an extinct genus of brachiopod belonging to the order Productida and family Productidae. Specimens have been found in Carboniferous beds across many continents, suggesting the genus had a cosmopolitan distribution. Species level taxonomy of Antiquatonia is in need of revision.

== Description ==
Like other members of Productinae, Antiquatonia had a deep corpus cavity, a geniculate profile with long trails, and well-developed marginal structures such as ear baffles. This genus had thick, halteroid ventral spines. The ears were flanked by a ridge of ventral spines, with complimentary internal lateral ridges.

== Classification ==
Muir-Wood & Cooper (1960) placed Antiquatonia in the subfamily Dictyoclostinae, though later analyses would find it to belong in Productinae instead. Leighton & Maples (2002) conducted multiple phylogenetic analyses which are strongly in agreement that Antiquatonia forms a clade with Diaphragmus and Spinocarinifera. The results of their phylogenetic analyses are displayed in the cladogram below:

- Productella
- - - Praewaagenoconcha
    - Sentosia
  - - Leioproductus
    - - - Spinocarinifera
        - - Diaphragmus
          - Antiquatonia
      - - - Flexaria
          - Buxtonia
        - - Pustula
          - - Echinoconchus
            - - Echinaria
              - - Pulchratia
                - Parajuresania
