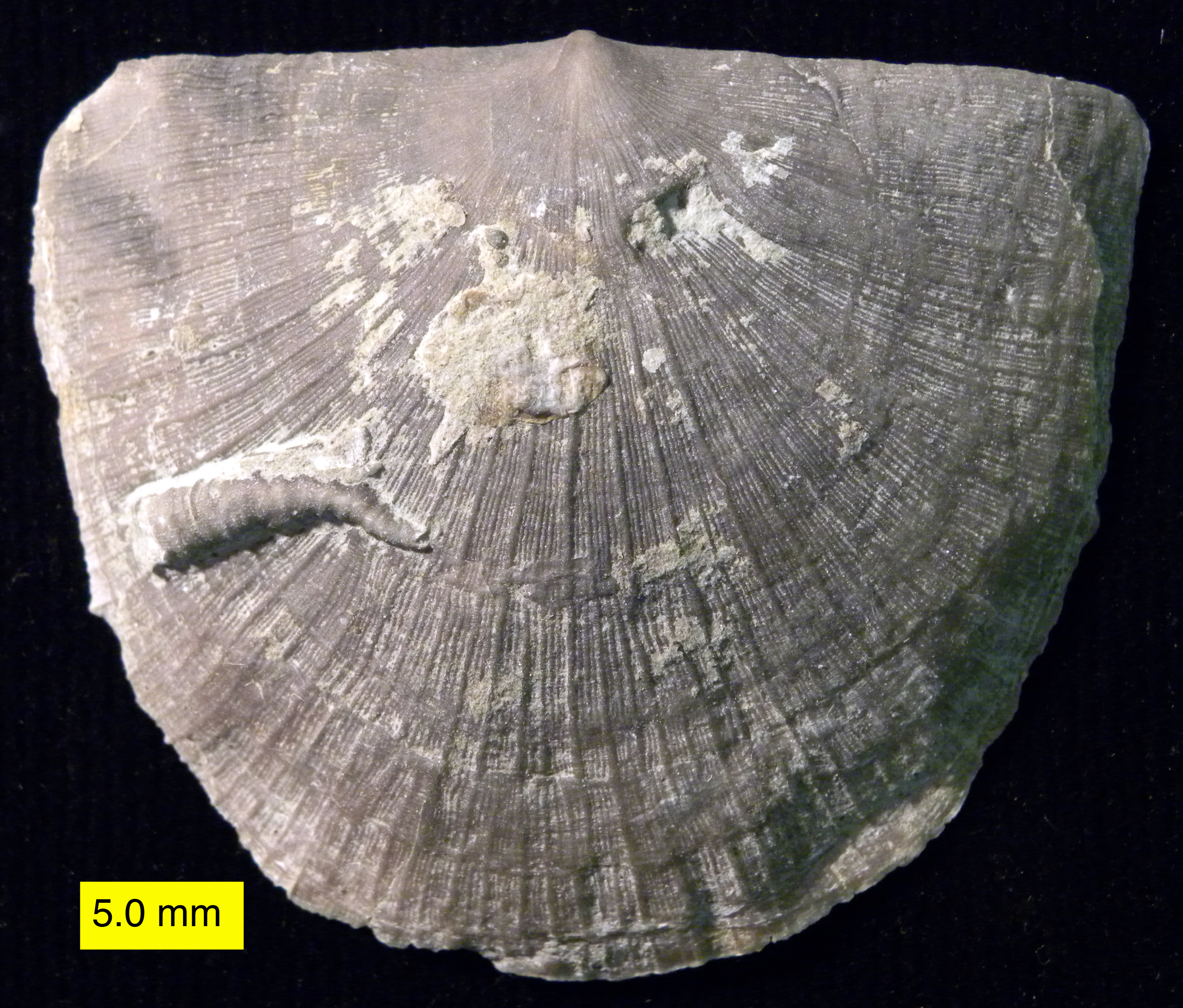
- Strophomenid brachiopod with encrusting cornulitid worm tube (Upper Ordovician, SE Indiana).

Scientific classification
- Kingdom: Animalia
- Phylum: Brachiopoda
- Subphylum: Rhynchonelliformea
- Class: †Strophomenata; Williams 1996

Orders
- †Billingsellida; †Orthotetida; †Productida; †Strophomenida

= Strophomenata =

Strophomenata Temporal range: Cambrian Stage 4-Triassic, 516-205 Ma

Extinct class of marine lamp shells

Strophomenata is an extinct class of brachiopods in the subphylum Rhynchonelliformea.

They originated in the Cambrian period, hugely diversified during the Ordovician, and faced near extinction from the Permian-Triassic extinction. Only a few lingered around in the Triassic until eventually going extinct. They were an exceptionally diverse group of brachiopods, and within the group the Strophomenids of the early Paleozoic and Productids of the late Paleozoic hugely contributed to the immense diversity.

== Common features ==
In The phylogeny and classification of Rhynchonelliformea, Strophomenates are described as having "no definite synapomorphies". A number of common features appear throughout the group, but there are many exceptions and none are universal to the group.

The common features of the Strophomenates include:

1. concavo-convex(sometimes convexi-concave), or plano-convex shells;
2. a laminar secondary shell layer with well developed pseudopunctae (microstructural features);
3. a bilobed cardinal process;
4. the existence of the pseudodeltidium;
5. a supra-apical/apical foramen, at least during juvenile stages, which is a feature associated to the egression of the pedicle during growth(many Strophomenates lose their pedicles after certain age).

== Orders ==
=== Billingsellida ===
An order that contains the suborder Clitambonitidina (and others?) .

=== Orthotetida ===
An order or superfamily that includes the Chilidiopsoidea. Ontogeny given by Bassett and Popov (2017), resembling that of Kutorginides.

Believed to be sister to Strophomenides, = Strophomenida + Billinsellida + Productida.

Includes the Chileids (e.g. Coolinia).

=== Strophomenida ===
Originating in the Early Ordovician and persisting until the Carboniferous, the Strophomenids were an extremely diverse order. Strophomenids are usually divided into two groups - the Plectambonitoidea and the Strophomenoidea. Some members used their short meaty pedicles for attachment, while many others lost their pedicle during growth and developed a free-lying lifestyle. As such a lot of their shells are concavo-convex. Microstructural features of the Strophomenid shell include a cross-laminar structure, and a pseudopunctate laminar layer often found with taleolae. Well-known Strophomenids include Leptaena, Sowerbyella, Rafinesquina, and Strophomena.
