= List of the prehistoric life of Alaska =

This list of the prehistoric life of Alaska contains the various prehistoric life-forms whose fossilized remains have been reported from within the US state of Alaska.

== Precambrian ==
The Paleobiology Database records no known occurrences of Precambrian fossils in Alaska.

== Paleozoic ==
=== Selected Paleozoic taxa of Alaska ===
- †Abadehella
- †Acanthophyllum
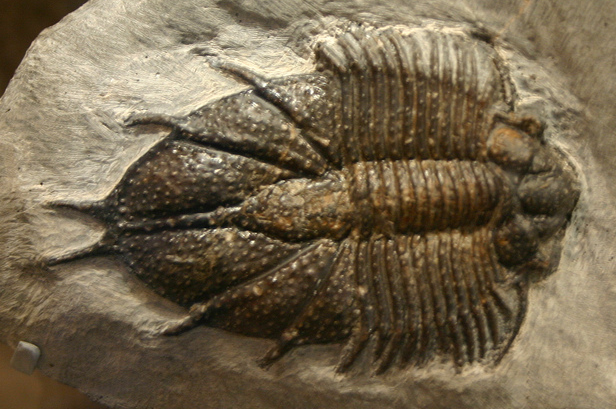
- Fossil of the Silurian-Middle Devonian trilobite Acanthopyge
  †Acanthopyge
- †Acmarhachis
- †Agoniatites – tentative report
- †Amplexus
- †Ancyrognathus
- †Anomphalus – tentative report
- †Athyris
  - †Athyris lamellosa – or unidentified related form
- †Atrypa
  - †Atrypa reticularis
- †Aulopora
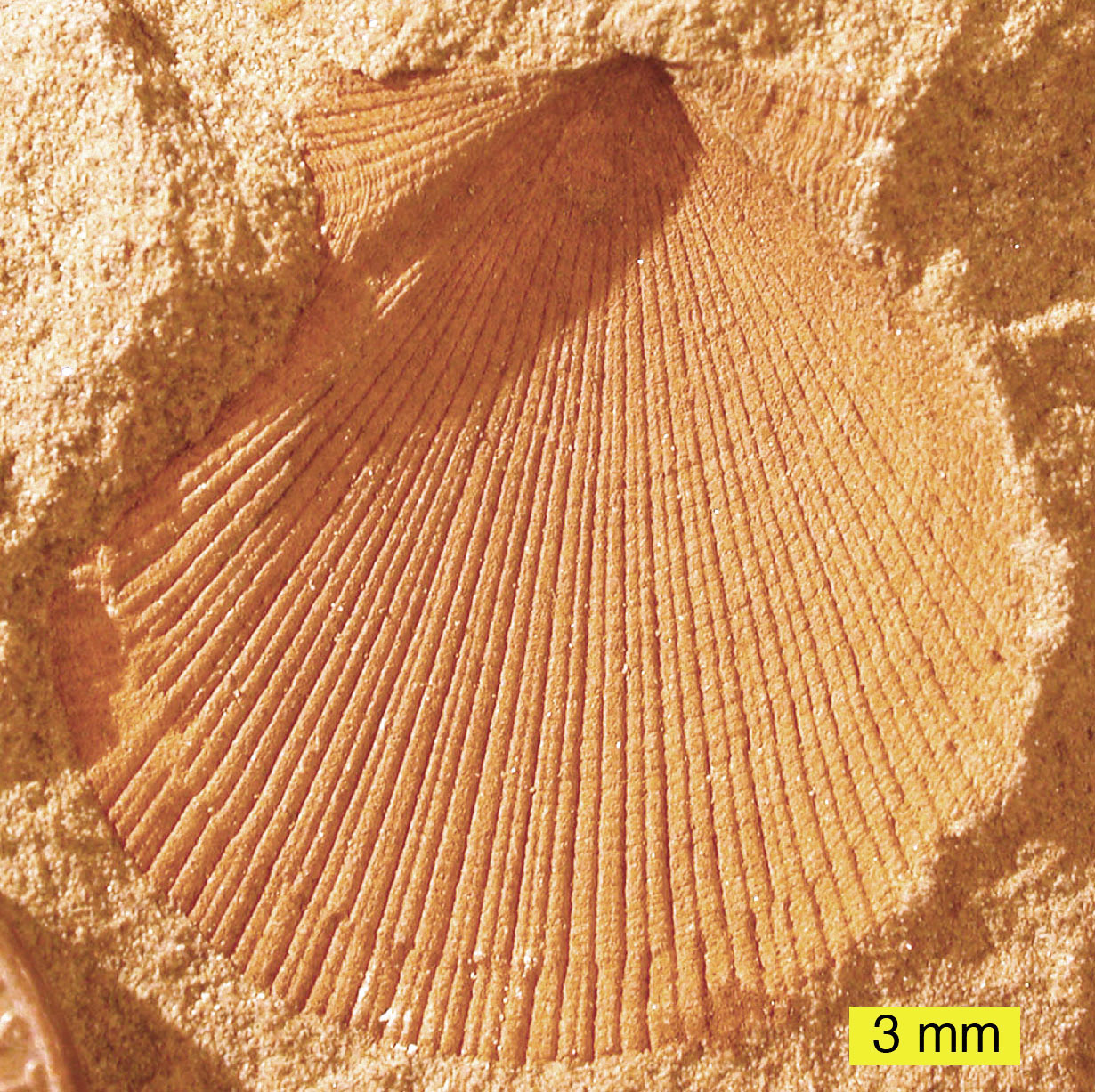
- Mold fossil of a shell of the Early Devonian-Late Triassic bivalve Aviculopecten
  †Aviculopecten
  - †Aviculopecten chesterensis – tentative report
  - †Aviculopecten delawarensis – or unidentified related form
  - †Aviculopecten edwardsi – or unidentified related form
  - †Aviculopecten fasciculatus – or unidentified related form
  - †Aviculopecten hardinensis – or unidentified related form
  - †Aviculopecten mccoyi – or unidentified related form
  - †Aviculopecten montpelierensis – or unidentified related form
  - †Aviculopecten occidentalis – or unidentified related form
  - †Aviculopecten similis – or unidentified related form
- † Avonia – tentative report
- †Bailiaspis
- †Bathyuriscus
- †Belemnites – tentative report
- †Bellerophon
  - †Bellerophon chapmani
  - †Bellerophon livengoodensis
  - †Bellerophon spergensis – or unidentified related form
- †Bembexia – tentative report
- †Bimuria
- †Callograptus
- †Calymene
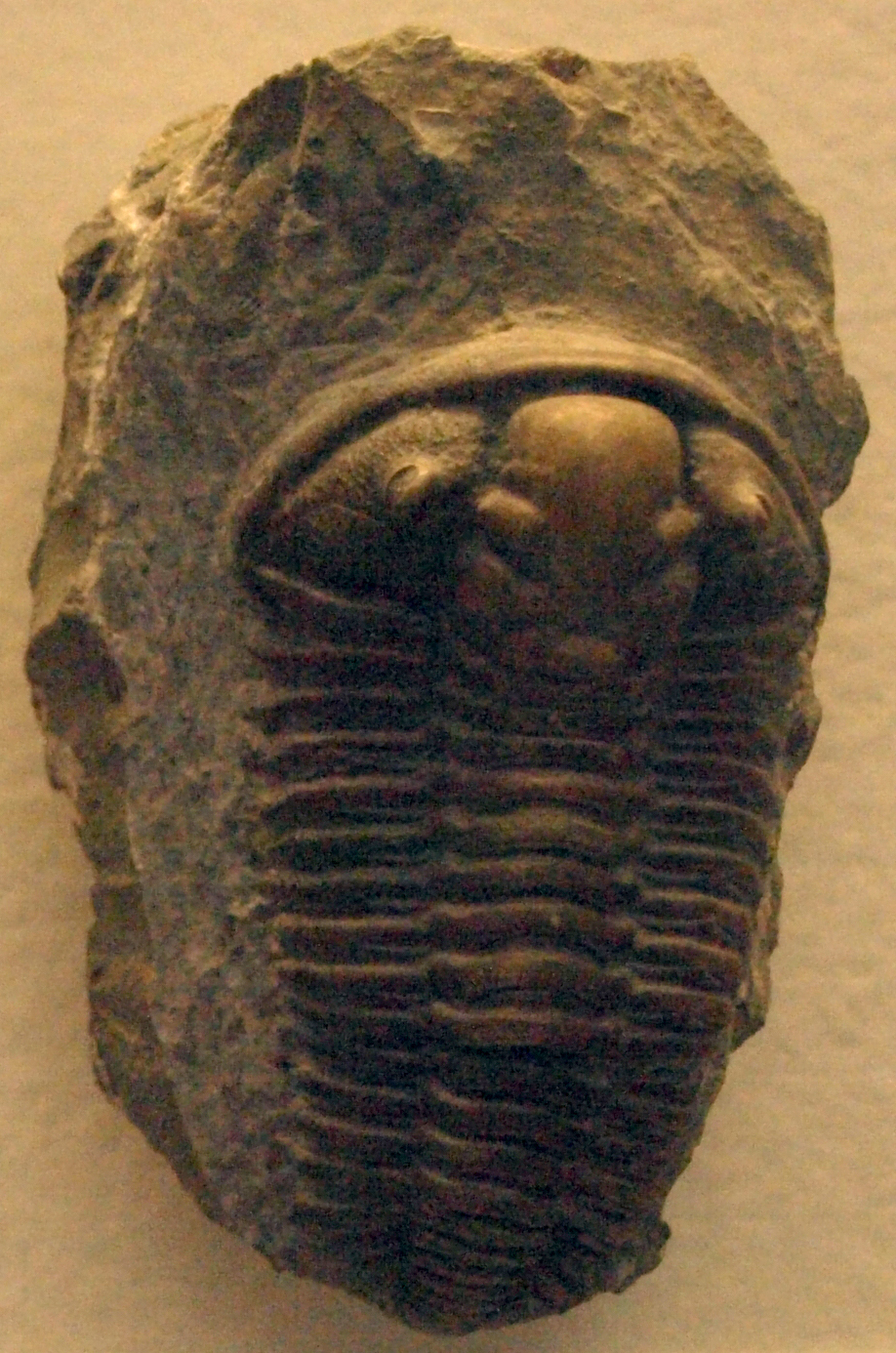
  - Fossil of the Silurian trilobite Calymene blumenbachii
    †Calymene blumenbachii
  - †Calymene iladon
- †Camarotoechia
  - †Camarotoechia billingsi – or unidentified comparable form
  - †Camarotoechia duplicata – tentative report
  - †Camarotoechia winiskensis – or unidentified comparable form
- Capulus
- †Catenipora
  - †Catenipora jacovikii – or unidentified comparable form
  - †Catenipora robustus – or unidentified comparable form
  - †Catenipora rubra – or unidentified comparable form
- †Cedaria
- †Cheirurus
- †Chirognathus – tentative report
- †Chonetes
  - †Chonetes capax – or unidentified related form
  - †Chonetes illinoisensis – or unidentified related form
  - †Chonetes manitobensis – or unidentified comparable form
  - †Chonetes timanicus – or unidentified related form
  - †Chonetes verneuile – or unidentified comparable form
  - †Chonetes verneuilianus – or unidentified related form
- †Christiania
- †Cladochonus
- †Cladospongia – type locality for genus
- †Cleiothyridina
  - †Cleiothyridina sublamellosa – or unidentified related form
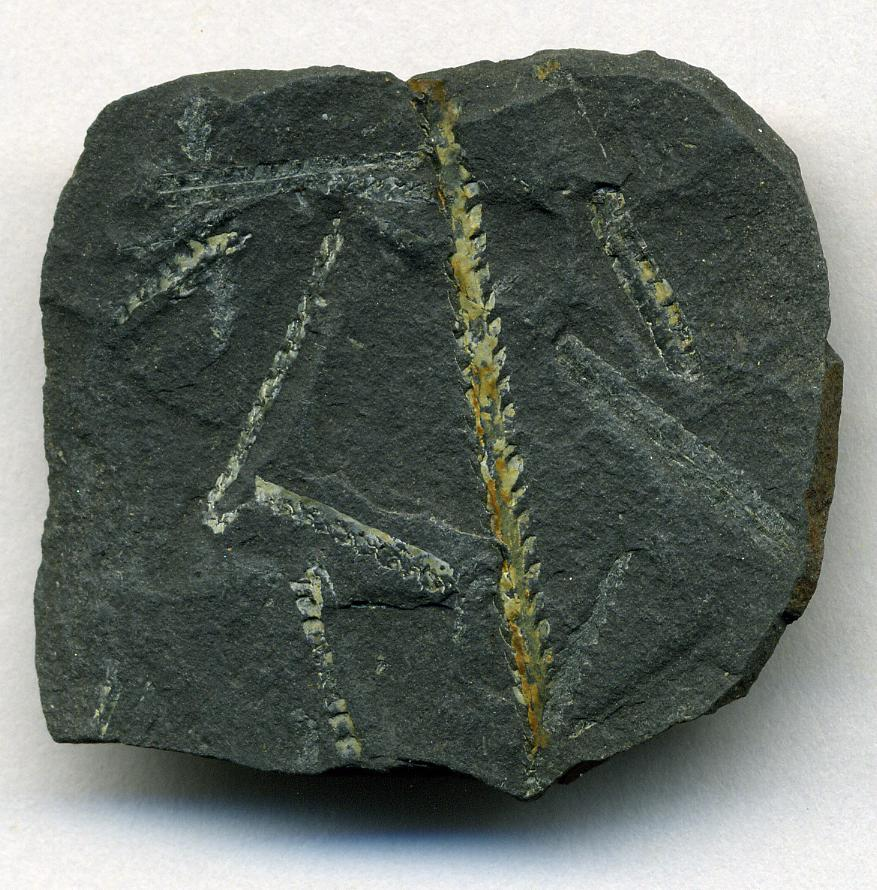
- Assemblage of fossils of the Cambrian graptolite Climacograptus
  †Climacograptus
  - †Climacograptus antiquus – or unidentified related form
  - †Climacograptus bicornis
  - †Climacograptus eximius – or unidentified comparable form
  - †Climacograptus hughesi – or unidentified comparable form
  - †Climacograptus indivisus
  - †Climacograptus innotatus
  - †Climacograptus medius
  - †Climacograptus minutus – tentative report
  - †Climacograptus phyllophorus – or unidentified comparable form
  - †Climacograptus pungens
  - †Climacograptus rectangularis
  - †Climacograptus scalaris
  - †Climacograptus stenotelus
  - †Climacograptus trifilis
- †Coenites
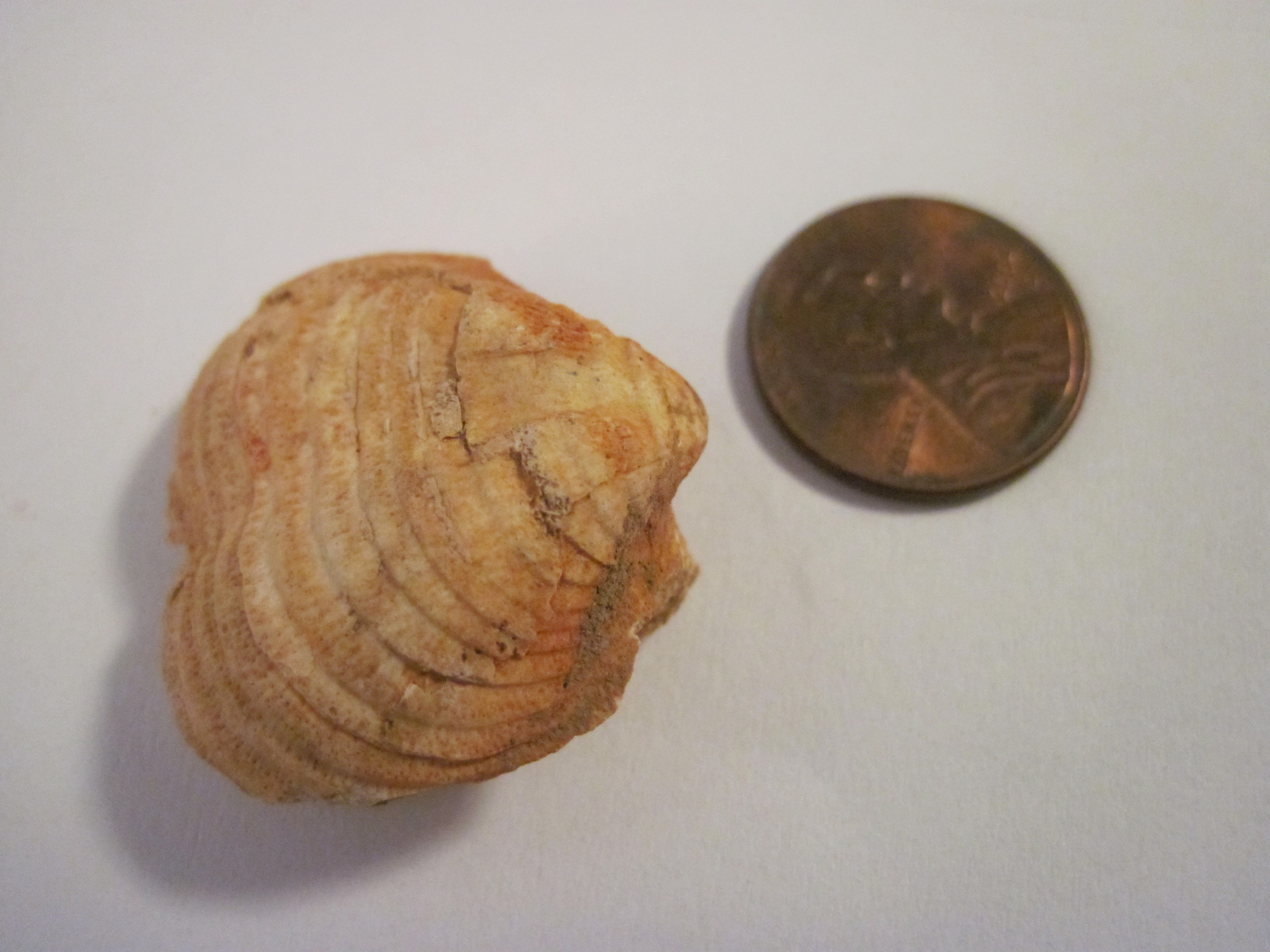
- Fossilized shell of the Late Devonian-Permian brachiopod Composita
  †Composita
  - †Composita ambigua – or unidentified comparable form
  - †Composita bellula – or unidentified related form
- †Conchidium
- †Conocardium
- †Cordylodus – tentative report
- †Crania
- †Craticula – report made of unidentified related form or using admittedly obsolete nomenclature
- †Cyclonema
- †Cyclopteris – tentative report
- †Cymbidium
- †Cyphaspis
- †Cypricardinia
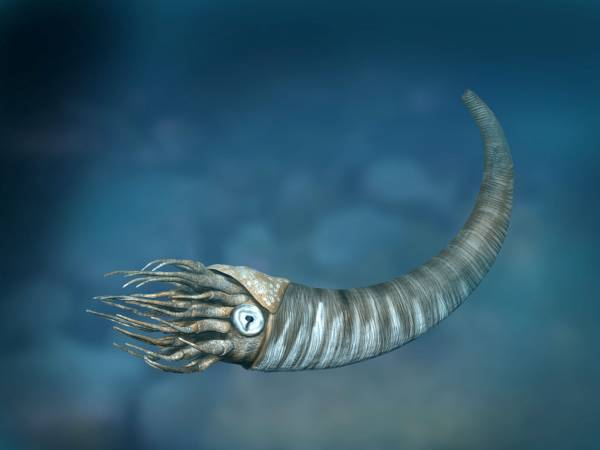
- Restoration of the Cambrian-Middle Devonian nautiloid cephalopod Cyrtoceras
  †Cyrtoceras
- †Cyrtospirifer
  - †Cyrtospirifer buddingtoni – type locality for species
  - †Cyrtospirifer paridaensis
- †Cystodictya
  - †Cystodictya lineata – or unidentified related form
  - †Cystodictya pustulosa – or unidentified related form
- †Dalmanites
- †Dendrograptus
- †Dentalium
  - †Dentalium hecetaensis
- †Dicoelosia
- †Dictyonema
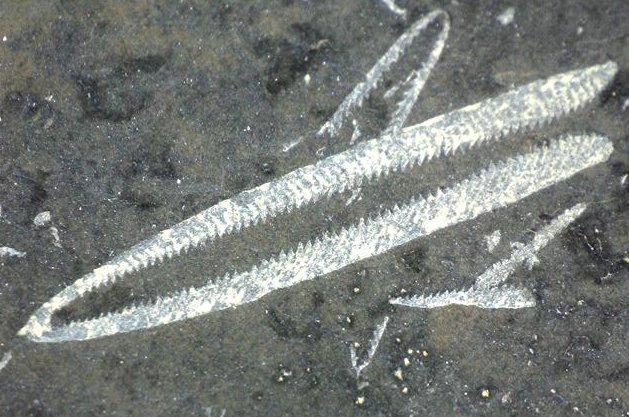
- Fossil of the Middle Ordovician graptolite Didymograptus
  †Didymograptus
  - †Didymograptus extensus – or unidentified comparable form
  - †Didymograptus nitidus – or unidentified comparable form
  - †Didymograptus sagitticaulis
  - †Didymograptus serratulus
- †Diplograptus
  - †Diplograptus cyperoides – or unidentified comparable form
  - †Diplograptus elongatus
  - †Diplograptus euglyptus
  - †Diplograptus hughesi
  - †Diplograptus inutilis
  - †Diplograptus modestus
  - †Diplograptus mucroterminatus
  - †Diplograptus multidens – or unidentified related form
  - †Diplograptus nicolsoni – or unidentified comparable form
- †Diplopora – tentative report
- †Drepanophycus
- †Edmondia
- † Ella – tentative report
- †Ellesmeroceras
- †Elrathia
- †Emmonsia
- †Eospirifer
- †Epiphyton
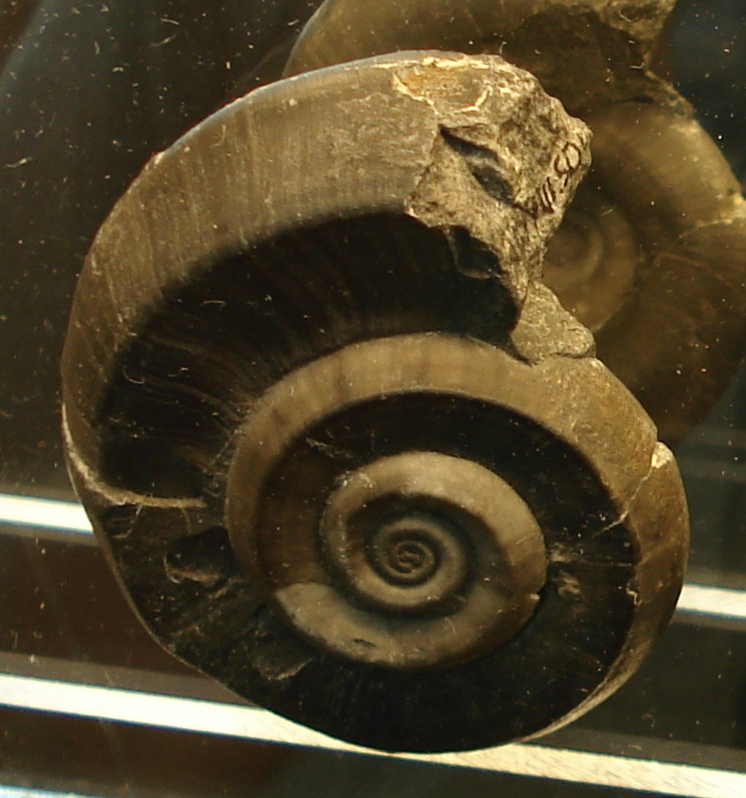
- Fossilized shell of the Silurian-Permian sea snail Euomphalus
  †Euomphalus
  - †Euomphalus brooksensis
  - †Euomphalus bundtzeni
  - †Euomphalus planodorsatus – or unidentified related form
  - †Euomphalus planorbis
  - †Euomphalus utahensis – or unidentified related form
- †Favosites
  - †Favosites emmonsi – or unidentified comparable form
  - †Favosites hemispericus
  - †Favosites hemisphericus
  - †Favosites limitaris
  - †Favosites radiciformis
- †Fenestella
- †Fletcheria – tentative report
- †Fusulina
- †Gastrioceras
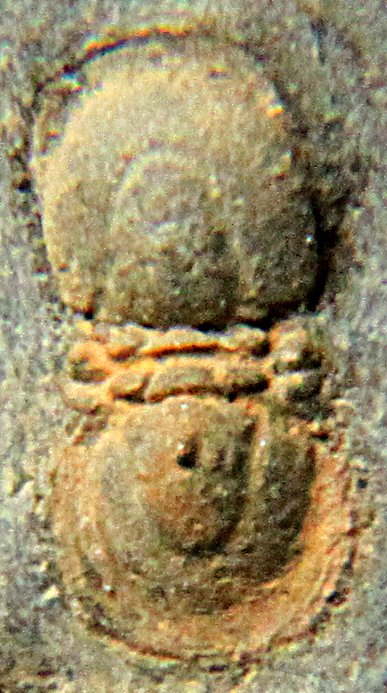
- Fossil of the Early-Late Ordovician trilobite Geragnostus
  †Geragnostus
- †Gervillia
- †Girvanella
- †Gomphoceras
- †Goniatites
- †Grewingkia
- †Gypospirifer
  - †Gypospirifer condor
- †Halysites
- †Harpides
- †Harpidium
- †Hedstroemia – tentative report
- †Heliophyllum
- †Hemirhodon
- †Hercynella
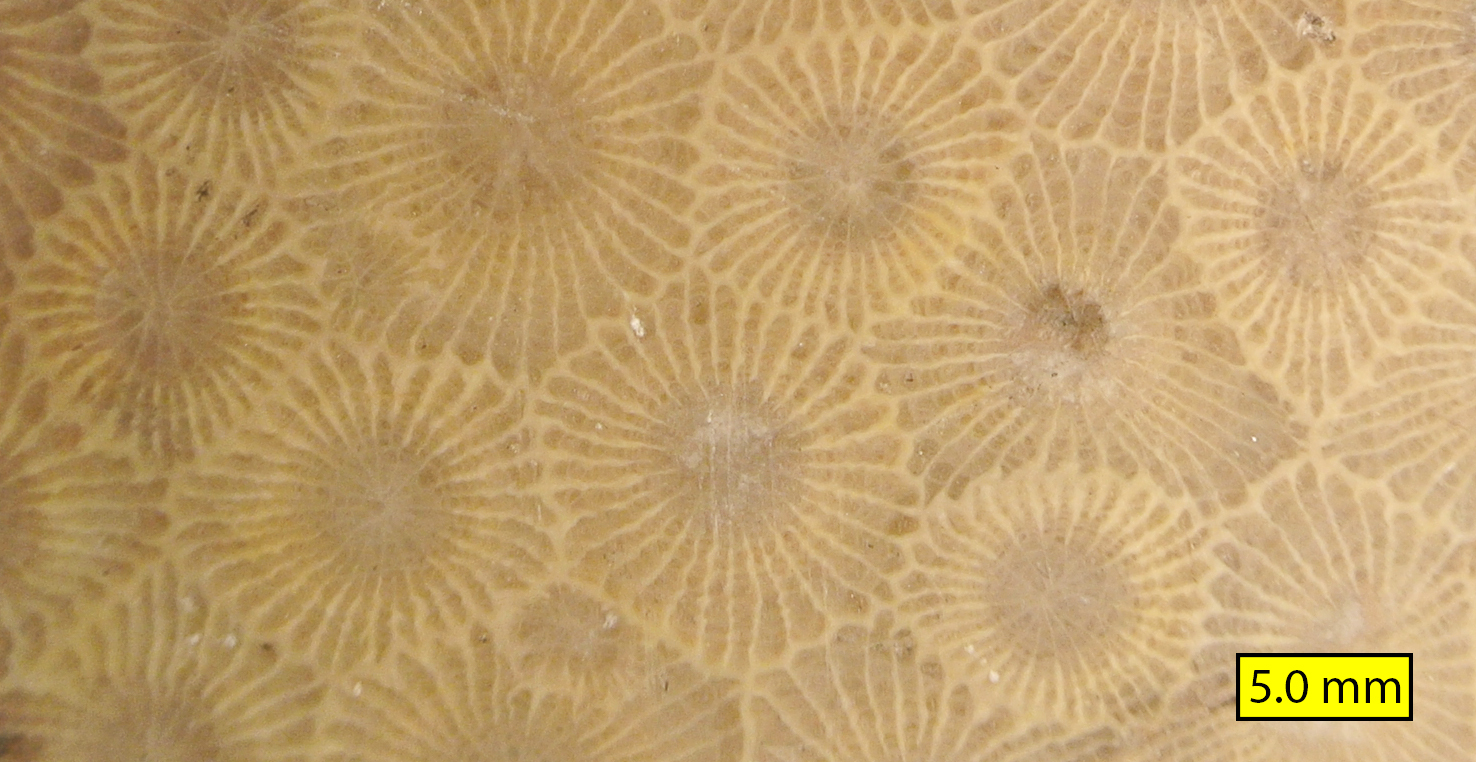
- Fossil of the Devonian colonial rugose coral Hexagonaria, also known as a Petoskey stone
  †Hexagonaria
- †Hindeodus
- †Holopea
- †Homagnostus
- †Howittia
- †Icriodus
  - †Icriodus angustoides
  - †Icriodus taimyricus
- †Idiognathodus
- †Isograptus
  - †Isograptus forcipiformis
  - †Isograptus manubriatus – or unidentified comparable form
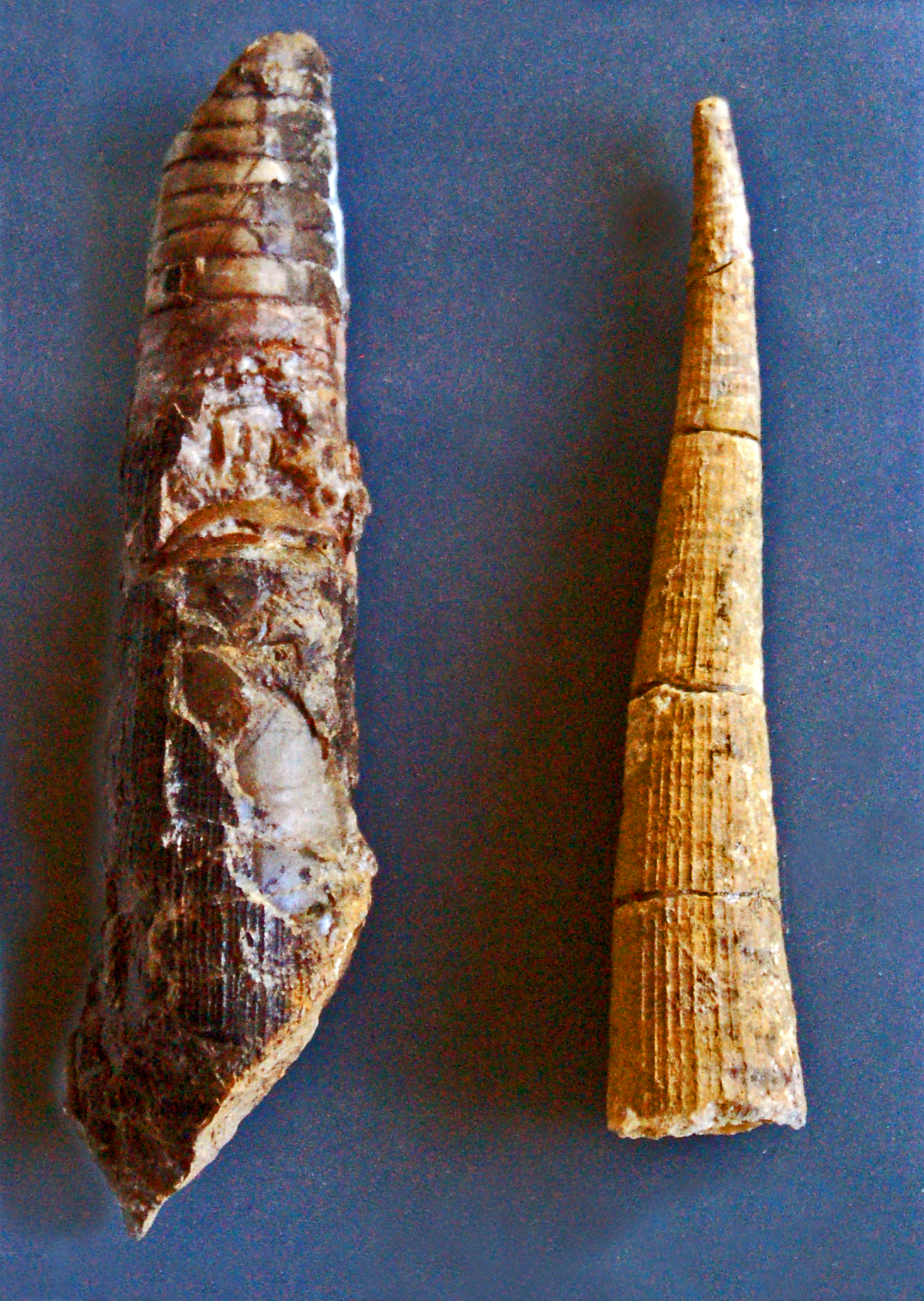
- Fossilized shells of the Middle Ordovician-Permian nautiloid cephalopod Kionoceras
  †Kionoceras
- †Kootenia
  - †Kootenia anabarensis – or unidentified comparable form
  - †Kootenia granulospinosa – type locality for species
  - †Kootenia serrata – or unidentified comparable form
- †Krausella
- †Lejopyge
  - †Lejopyge laevigata
- †Lichas
- Lima
- †Lingula
- †Lithostrotion
  - †Lithostrotion mclareni
  - †Lithostrotion portlocki – or unidentified related form
  - †Lithostrotion sinuosum
  - †Lithostrotion warreni
- †Lucina
- †Martinia
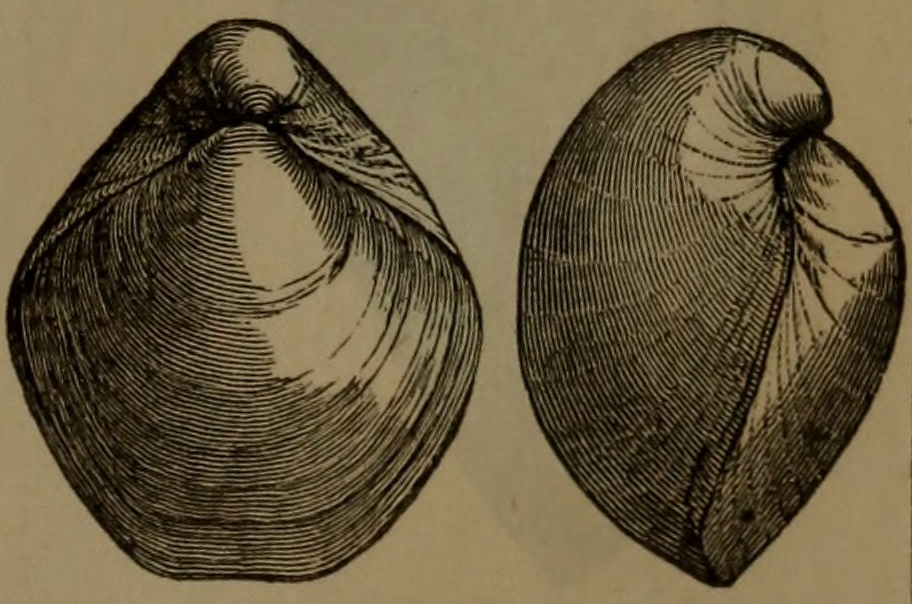
- Illustration (lower right, entry 15) of a fossilized shell in front and side views of the Silurian-Late Devonian brachiopod Meristella
  †Meristella
  - †Meristella barrisi – or unidentified comparable form
  - †Meristella ceras – or unidentified comparable form
  - †Meristella tumida – tentative report
- †Meristina
- Mesophyllum
- †Michelinoceras – tentative report
- †Microplasma
- †Modiolus – tentative report
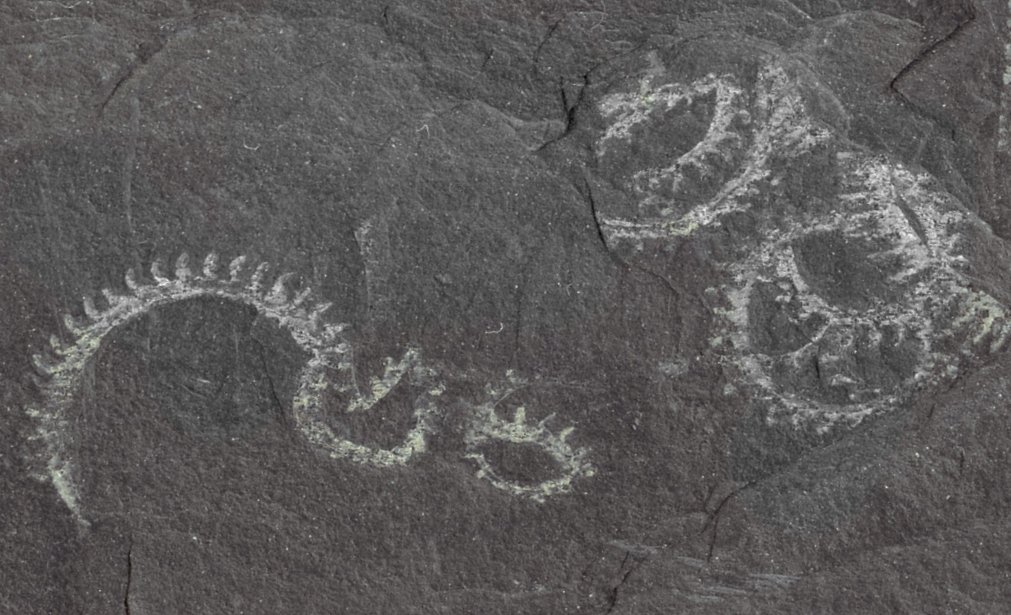
- Fossils of the Early Devonian graptolite Monograptus
  †Monograptus
  - †Monograptus acinaces
  - †Monograptus atavus
  - †Monograptus bohemicus
  - †Monograptus buddingtoni
  - †Monograptus calamistratus
  - †Monograptus clingani – or unidentified related form
  - †Monograptus convolutus
  - †Monograptus crenularis – or unidentified comparable form
  - †Monograptus crinitus
  - †Monograptus cyphus
  - †Monograptus difformis – or unidentified comparable form
  - †Monograptus dubius
  - †Monograptus gregarius
  - †Monograptus incommodus – or unidentified comparable form
  - †Monograptus involutus – or unidentified comparable form
  - †Monograptus nilssoni
  - †Monograptus noyesensis
  - †Monograptus pacificus
  - †Monograptus praedubius – or unidentified related form
  - †Monograptus priodon
  - †Monograptus pseudodubius
  - †Monograptus raitzhainesis – or unidentified related form
  - †Monograptus revolutus
  - †Monograptus scanicus
  - †Monograptus tenuis
  - †Monograptus thomasi – or unidentified related form
  - †Monograptus tumescens
  - †Monograptus uncinatus
  - †Monograptus undulatus
  - †Monograptus varians
  - †Monograptus vulgaris – or unidentified comparable form
  - †Monograptus yukonensis
- †Morania
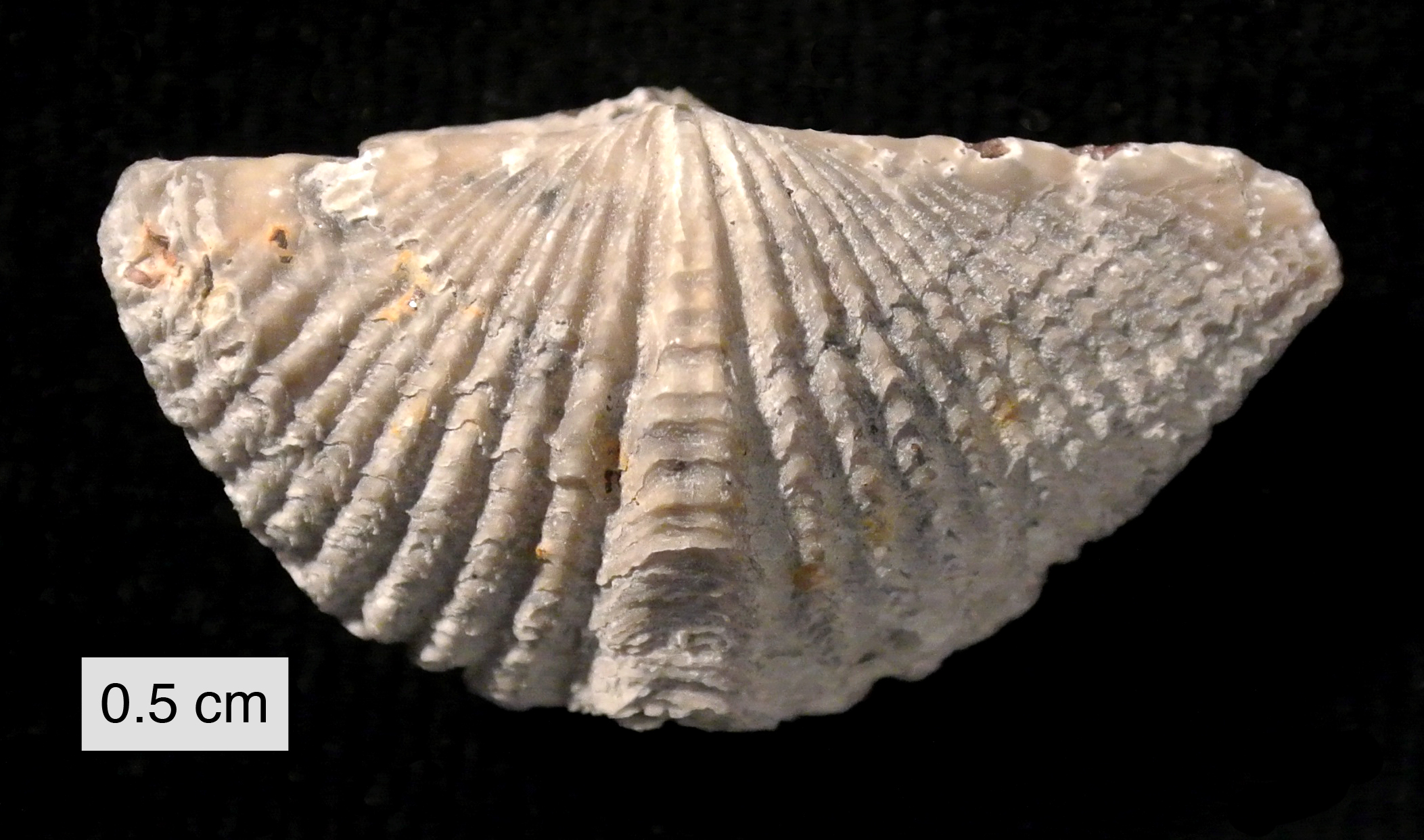
- Fossilized shell of the Devonian brachiopod Mucrospirifer
  †Mucrospirifer
  - †Mucrospirifer refugiensis – type locality for species
- †Murchisonia
- †Naticopsis
  - †Naticopsis bowsheri
  - †Naticopsis carleyana – or unidentified related form
  - †Naticopsis suturicompta
- †Neogondolella
- †Neospirifer
  - †Neospirifer cameratus
  - †Neospirifer fasciger – or unidentified related form
  - †Neospirifer striatus – tentative report
- †Nowakia
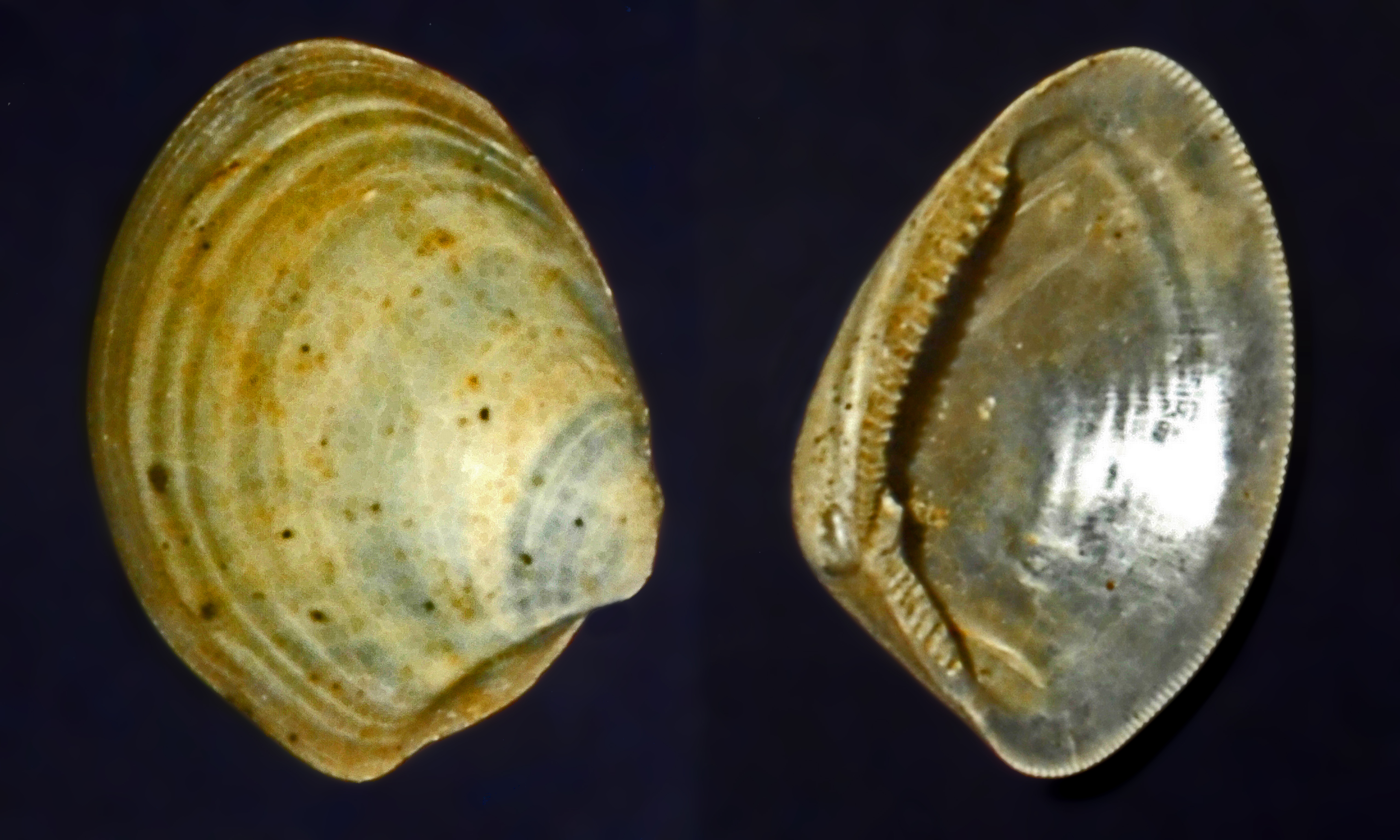
- Interior of a fossilized shell of the Early Ordovician-modern marine bivalve Nucula
  Nucula
  - †Nucula shumardiana – or unidentified related form
- †Oncagnostus
  - †Oncagnostus tumidosus
- †Oonoceras
- †Orthoceras
  - †Orthoceras anguliferas – or unidentified comparable form
- †Oulodus
- †Ozarkodina
  - †Ozarkodina confluens
  - †Ozarkodina eberleini – type locality for species
  - †Ozarkodina paucidentata – or unidentified comparable form
- †Pagetia
- †Panenka
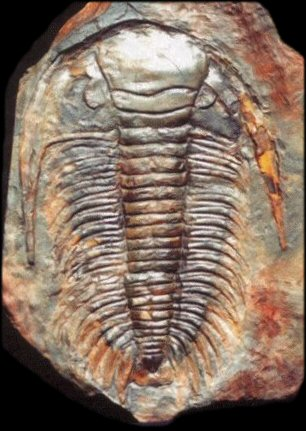
- Fossil of the Cambrian trilobite Paradoxides
  †Paradoxides
- †Parafusulina – tentative report
- †Pecopteris
  - †Pecopteris arborescens
  - †Pecopteris hemitelioides
  - †Pecopteris unita
- †Pentamerus
- †Peronopsis
- †Phalagnostus
- †Phillipsia
- †Phyllograptus
- †Pinna
- †Platyceras
- †Platycrinites
- Pleurotomaria
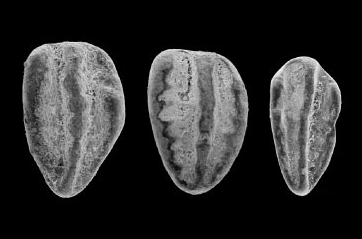
- Various conodont elements of Polygnathus
  †Polygnathus
  - †Polygnathus alexanderensis
  - †Polygnathus angusticostatus
  - †Polygnathus angustipennatus
  - †Polygnathus aspelundi
  - †Polygnathus borealis
  - †Polygnathus brevis
  - †Polygnathus churkini
  - †Polygnathus costatus
  - †Polygnathus eberleini
  - †Polygnathus eiflius
  - †Polygnathus inversus
  - †Polygnathus kennettensis
  - †Polygnathus linguiformis
  - †Polygnathus pacificus
  - †Polygnathus parawebbi
  - †Polygnathus perbonus – or unidentified related form
  - †Polygnathus praetrigonicus
  - †Polygnathus pseudofoliatus
  - †Polygnathus robusticostatus
  - †Polygnathus samueli
  - †Polygnathus sinuosus
  - †Polygnathus trigonicus
  - †Polygnathus unicornis
  - †Polygnathus xylus
- †Prodentalium
- †Proetus
- †Prohedinia
- †Pseudoamplexus
- †Pseudobornia
  - †Pseudobornia ursina
- †Pseudomelania
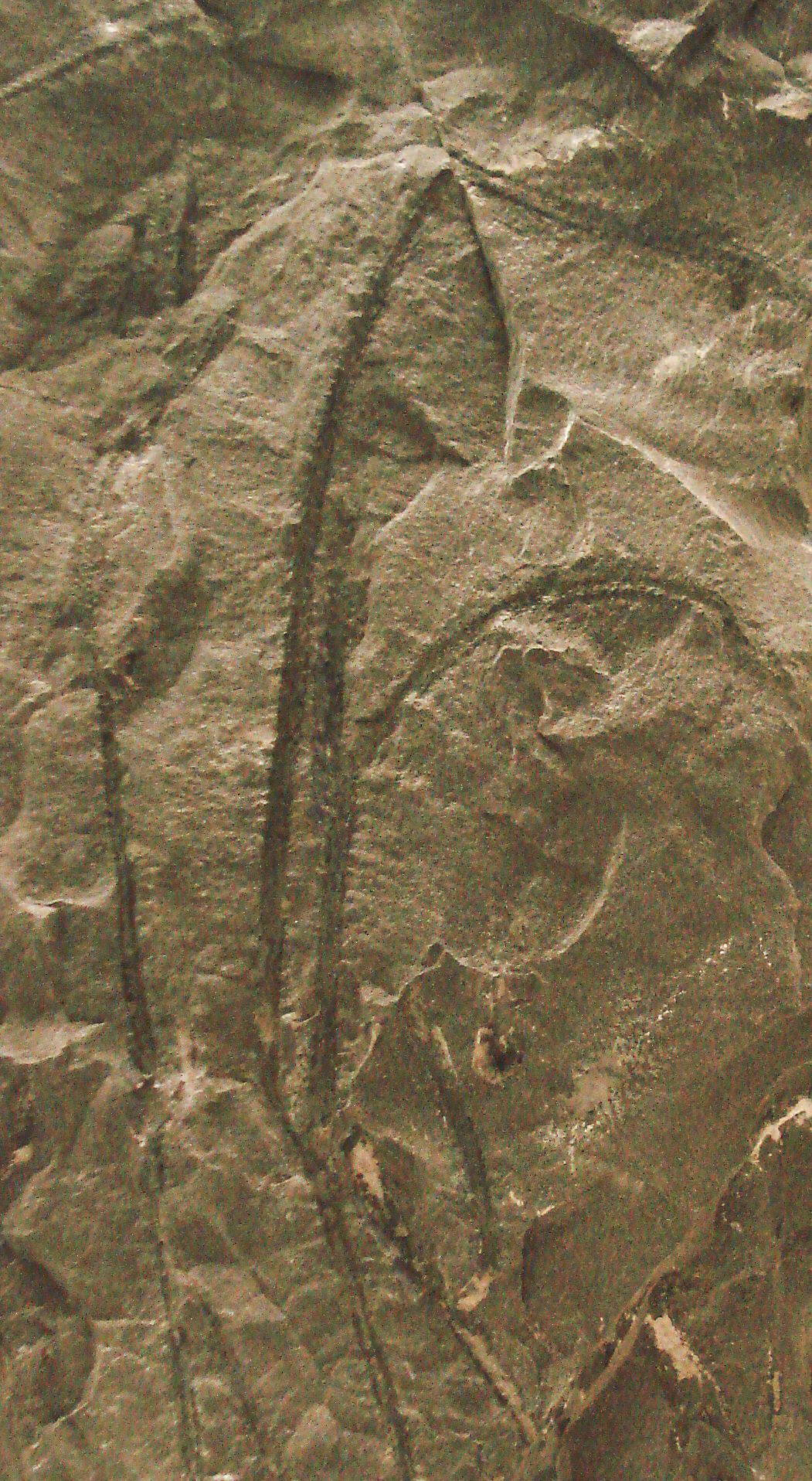
- Fossil of the primitive Devonian vascular plant Psilophyton
  †Psilophyton
- †Pteria – report made of unidentified related form or using admittedly obsolete nomenclature
- †Ptychagnostus
- †Pugnax
- †Receptaculites
- †Rhynchonella
- †Rothpletzella
- † Sarcinula
- †Schwagerina
- †Sinutropis
- †Skenidioides
- †Solenopora
  - †Solenopora compacta
  - †Solenopora filiformis
- † Solenopsis – tentative report
- †Sowerbyella
- †Spathognathodus
- †Sphaerina
- †Sphaerocodium
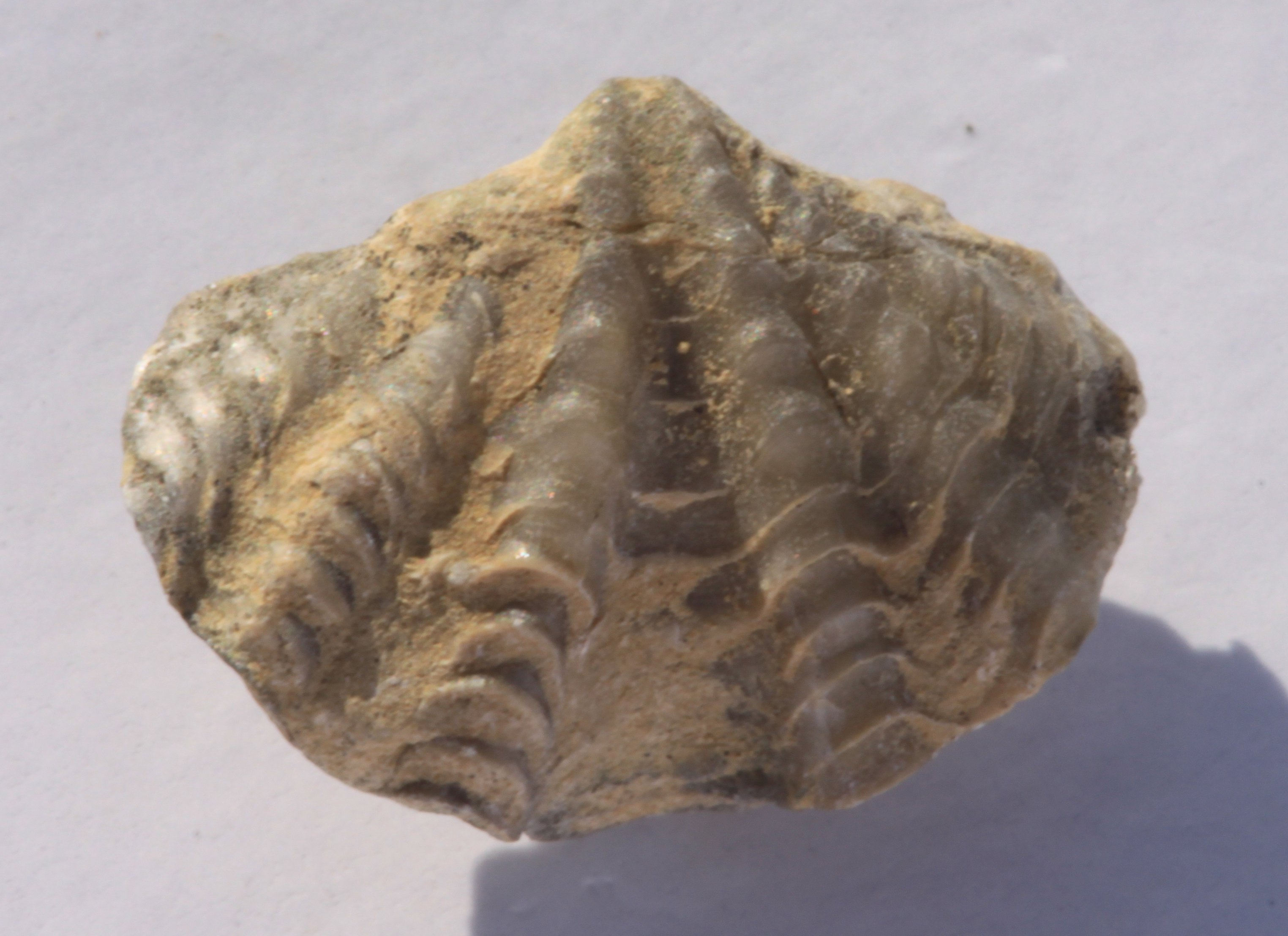
- Fossilized shell of the Late Ordovician-Late Triassic brachiopod Spirifer
  †Spirifer
  - †Spirifer schellwieni – or unidentified related form
- †Spiriferina
  - †Spiriferina panderi – or unidentified related form
- Spirorbis
- †Spyroceras
- †Stringocephalus
- †Strophomena
- †Syringopora
- †Taeniocrada
- †Teganium
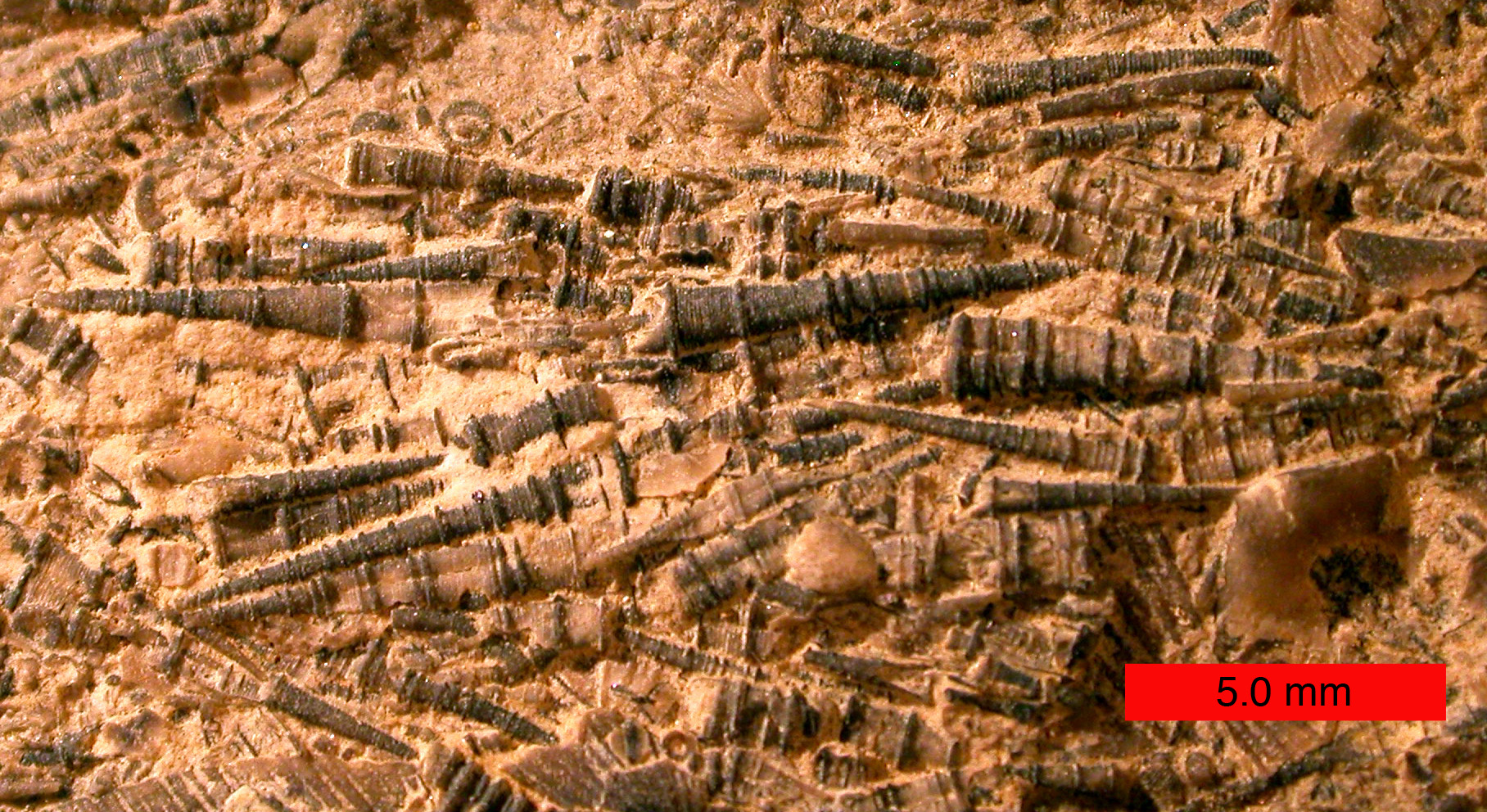
- Assemblage of fossilized shells of the Early Ordovician-Late Devonian probable mollusc Tentaculites
  †Tentaculites
- †Tetradium
- †Tetragraptus
- †Triarthrus
- †Uraloceras
  - †Uraloceras burtiense
  - †Uraloceras fedorowi
  - †Uraloceras involutum
  - †Uraloceras nevadense
- †Westergaardodina
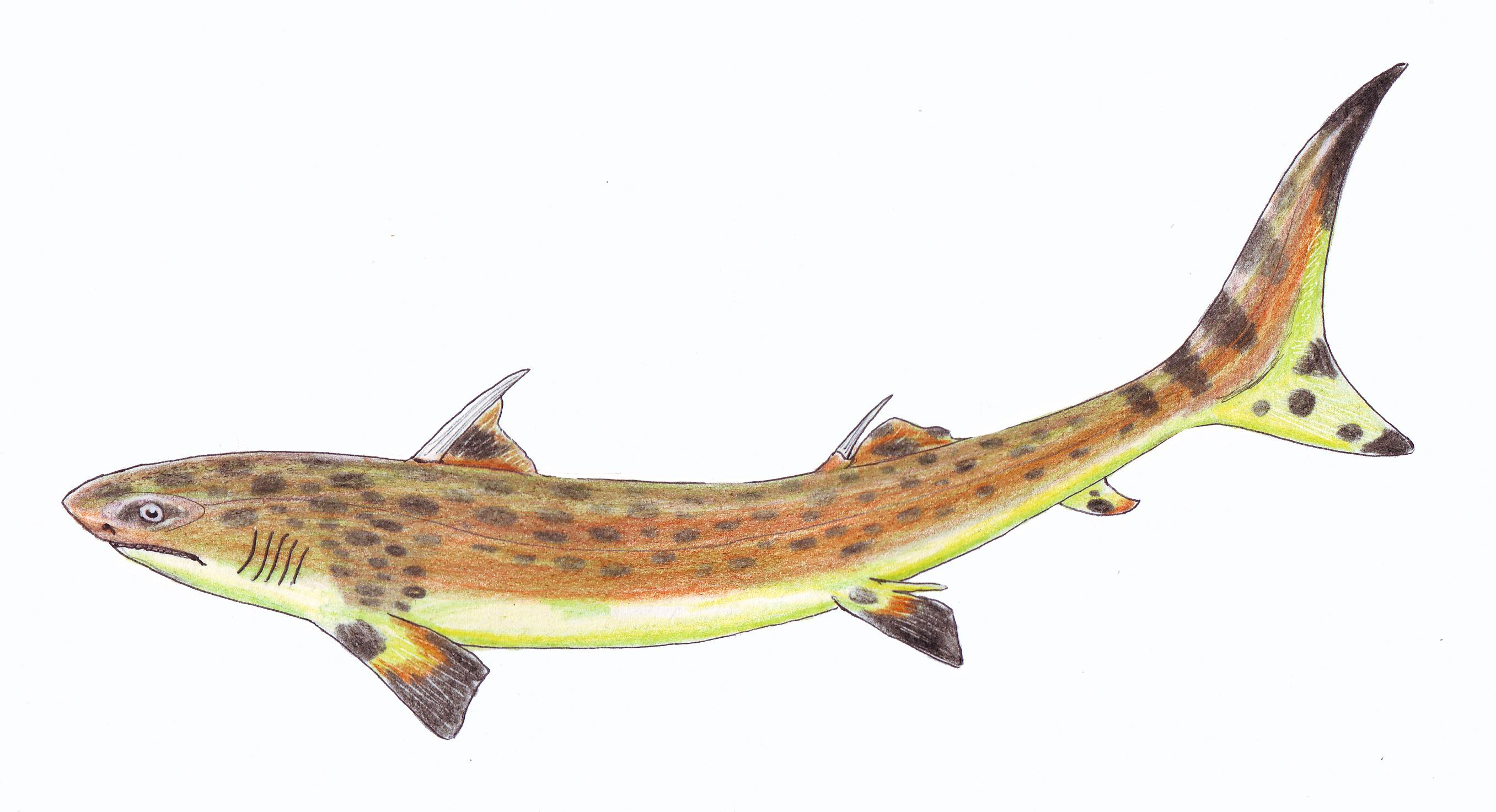
- Restoration of the Permian shark Wodnika
  †Wodnika
- †Zacanthoides

== Mesozoic ==
=== Selected Mesozoic taxa of Alaska ===
This list of the Mesozoic life of Alaska contains the various prehistoric life-forms whose fossilized remains have been reported from within the US state of Alaska and are between 252.17 and 66 million years of age.

- †Actinoceramus
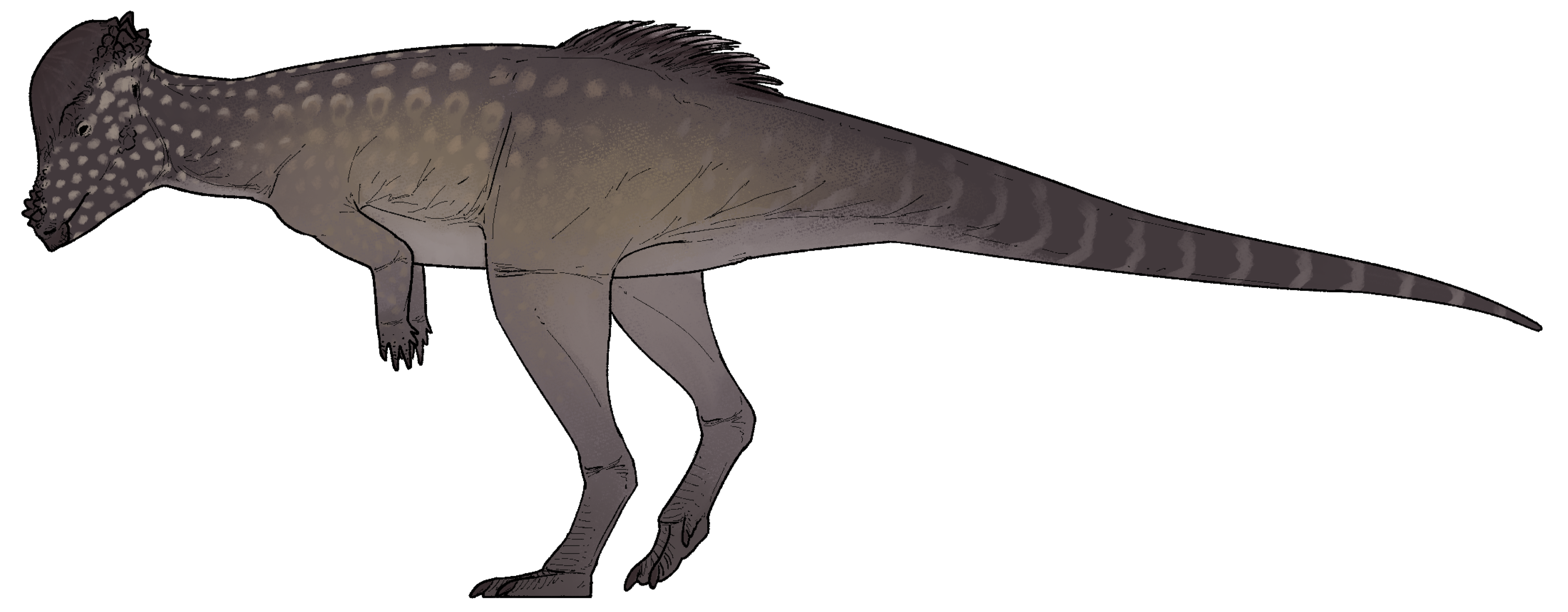
- Life restoration of the Late Cretaceous dome-headed dinosaur Alaskacephale and inset diagram depicting it with an anachronistic human to scale
  †Alaskacephale – type locality for genus
  - †Alaskacephale gangloffi – type locality for species
- †Amaltheus
- †Amblydactylus
- †Amoeboceras
- Amusium
- †Anagaudryceras
  - †Anagaudryceras auranium
  - †Anagaudryceras aurarium
  - †Anagaudryceras inflatus
  - †Anagaudryceras sacya – type locality for species
- †Anapachydiscus
  - †Anapachydiscus nelchinensis – type locality for species
- †Anatomites
- †Anomia
- †Arcestes
- †Archaeocidaris – tentative report
- †Arcthoplites
- Arctica – tentative report
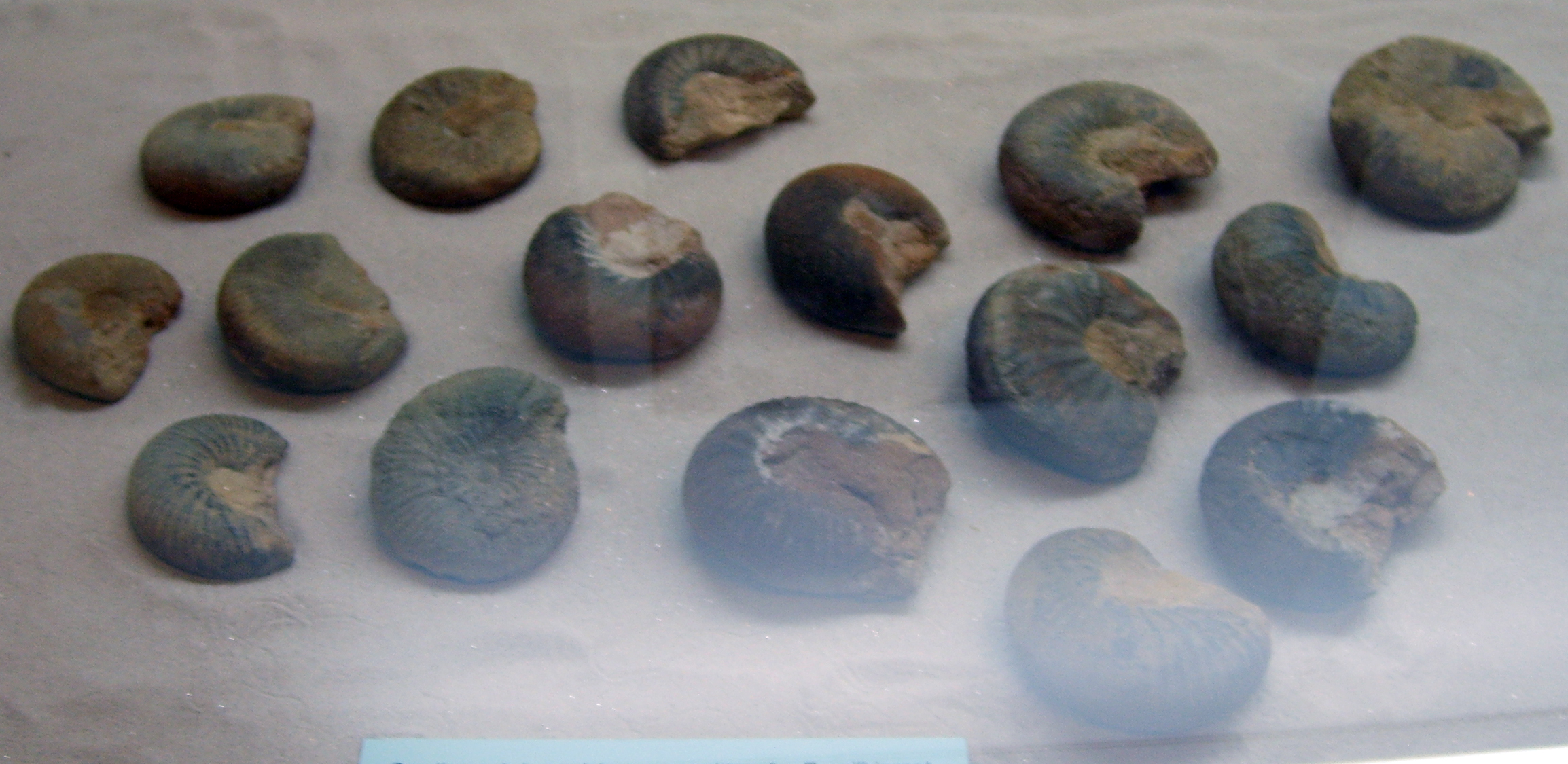
- Fossilized shells of the Middle Jurassic ammonoid cephalopod Arcticoceras
  †Arcticoceras
- †Arctocephalites
  - †Arctocephalites alticostus
  - †Arctocephalites costidensus – type locality for species
  - †Arctocephalites pompeckji
- †Arctoceras
- †Arieticeras
- †Arnioceras
- †Arpadites – tentative report
- †Aspenites
- Astarte
- †Asthenoceras
- †Aviculopecten
- †Baculites
- †Belemnites
- †Bradfordia
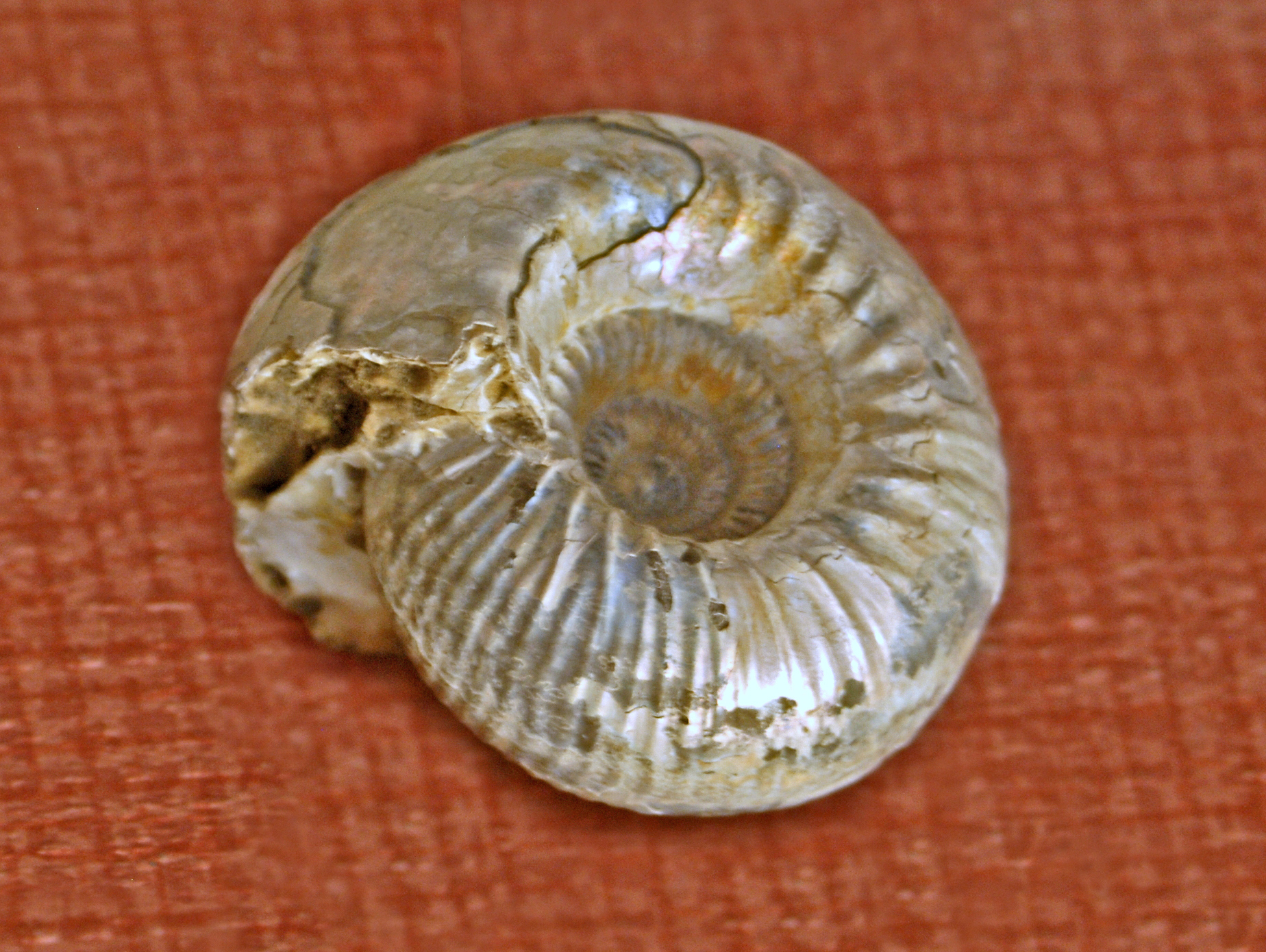
- Fossilized shell of the Middle Jurassic ammonoid cephalopod Cadoceras
  †Cadoceras
  - †Cadoceras bathomphalum – type locality for species
  - †Cadoceras catostoma
  - †Cadoceras chinitnense – type locality for species
  - †Cadoceras comma – type locality for species
  - †Cadoceras crassicostatum – type locality for species
  - †Cadoceras doroschini
  - †Cadoceras glabrum – type locality for species
  - †Cadoceras grewingki
  - †Cadoceras kialagvikense – type locality for species
  - †Cadoceras petelini
  - †Cadoceras schmidti
  - †Cadoceras tenuicostatum – type locality for species
  - †Cadoceras wosnessenskii
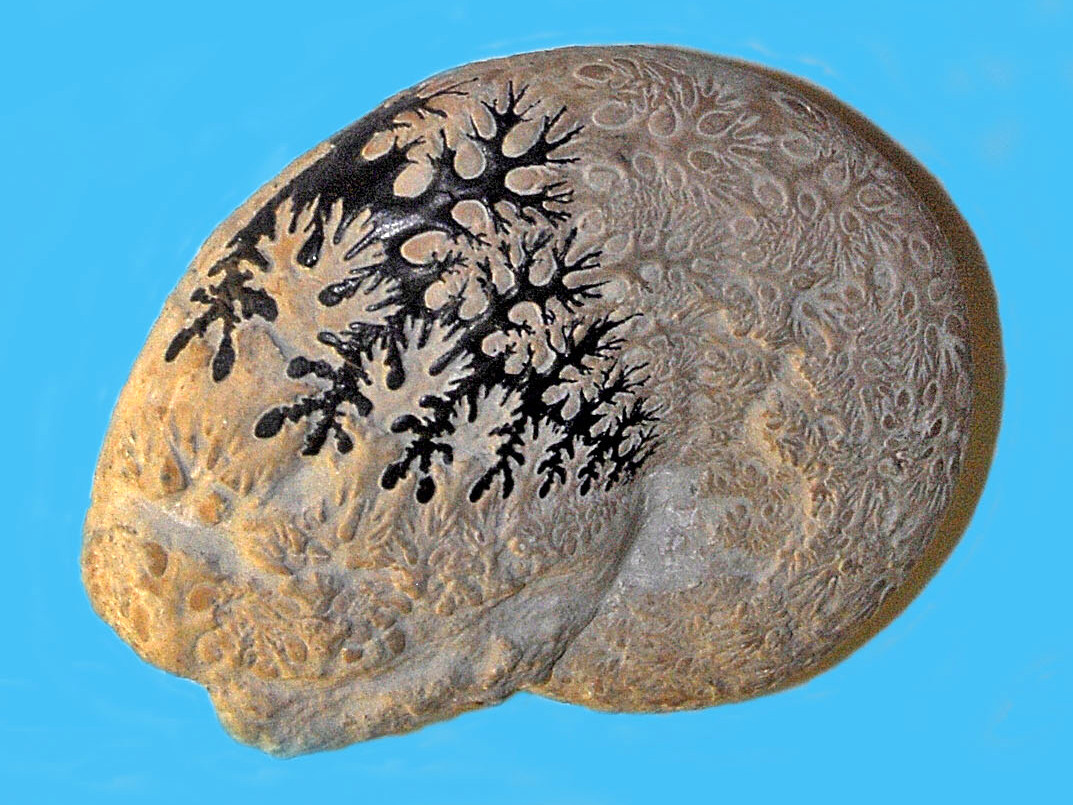
- Fossilized shell of the Early Jurassic-Early Cretaceous ammonoid cephalopod Calliphylloceras
  †Calliphylloceras
  - †Calliphylloceras aldersoni – or unidentified comparable form
  - †Calliphylloceras freibrocki – type locality for species
  - †Calliphylloceras nizinanum – type locality for species
- †Calycoceras
- Capulus – tentative report
- Cardinia
- Cardita – tentative report
- †Cenoceras
- †Ceratites
- Cerithium – tentative report
- Chlamys
- †Chondrites – tentative report
- †Chonetes – tentative report
- Cidaris – tentative report
- †Cimolodon
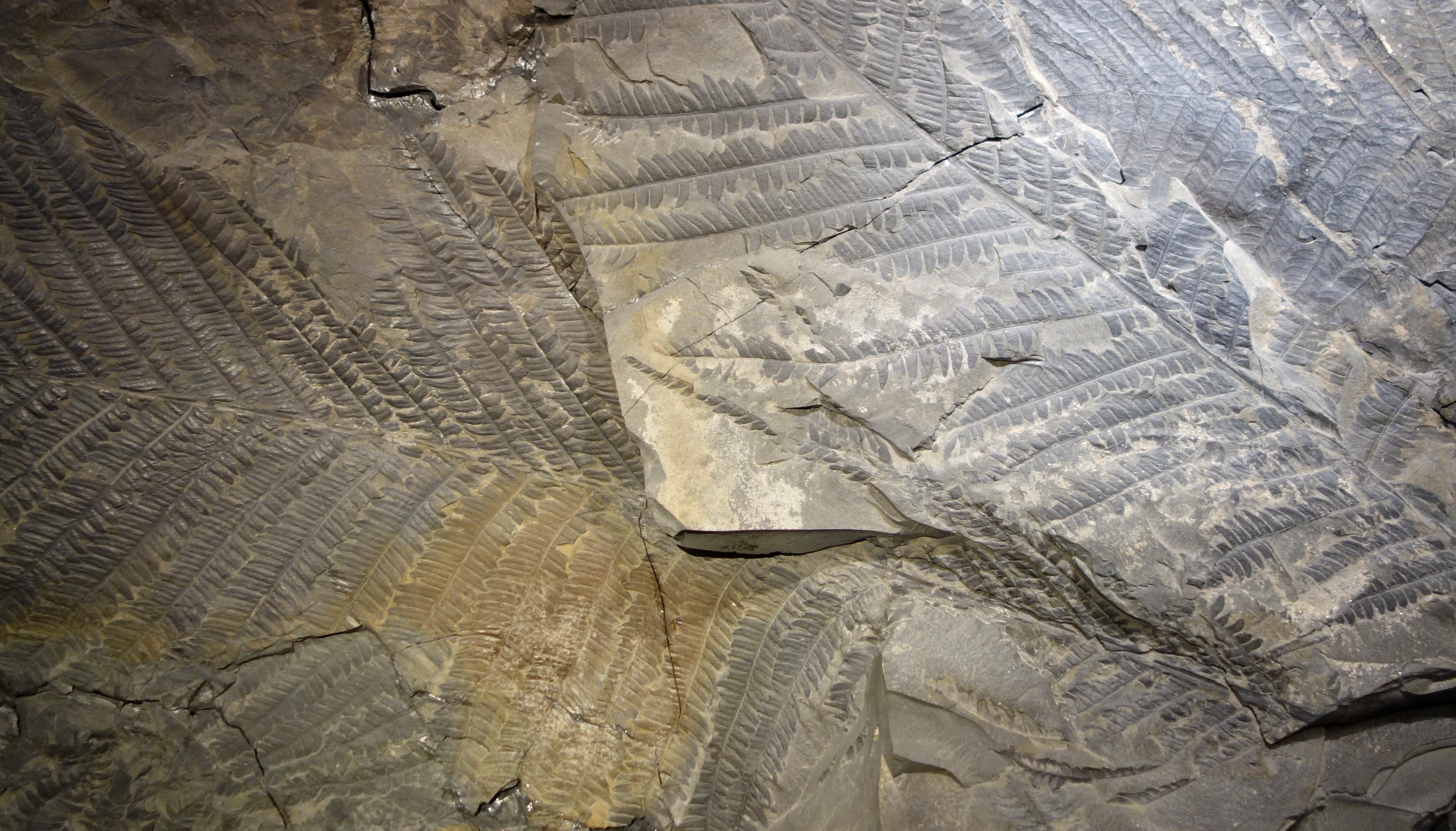
- Fossilized foliage of the Permian-Late Cretaceous fern Cladophlebis
  Cladophlebis
  - †Cladophlebis hirta – tentative report
- †Claraia
  - †Claraia stachei
- †Cleoniceras
- †Collonia
- †Corum
- †Cosmonautilus – tentative report
- †Ctenophyllum
- †Cylindroteuthis
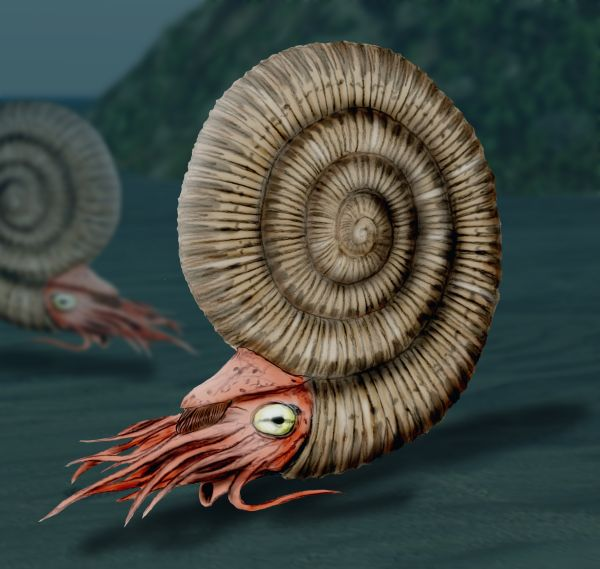
- Restoration of the Early Jurassic ammonoid cephalopod Dactylioceras
  †Dactylioceras
  - †Dactylioceras commune – or unidentified comparable form
- †Daonella
- †Daxatina
- †Dentalium
- †Desmoceras
- †Desmophyllites
- †Didymoceras
  - †Didymoceras hornbyense – or unidentified related form
- †Docidoceras
  - †Docidoceras camachoi – type locality for species
  - †Docidoceras longalvum – or unidentified related form
  - †Docidoceras paucinodosum – type locality for species
- †Douvilleiceras
- †Dromaeosaurus
  - †Dromaeosaurus albertensis
- †Edmontonia
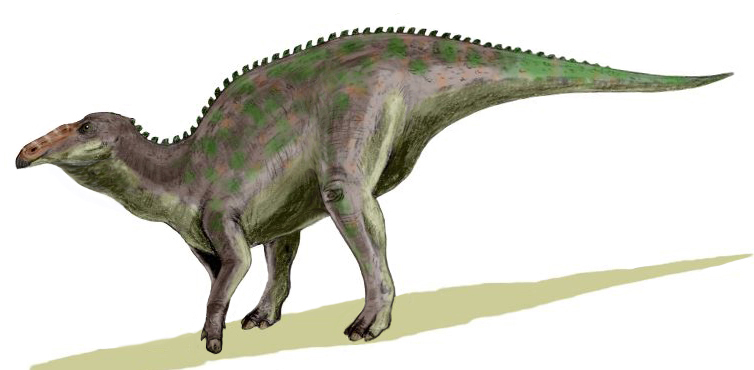
- Restoration of the Late Cretaceous duck-billed dinosaur Edmontosaurus annectens
  †Edmontosaurus – or unidentified related form
  - †Edmontosaurus saskatchewanensis
- †Ellisonia
- †Epigondolella
- †Euaptetoceras
- †Eubostrychoceras
- †Eudmetoceras
- †Euomphaloceras
- †Euomphalus
- †Fresvillia
- †Gaudryceras
- †Germanonautilus
- †Gervillia
- Ginkgo
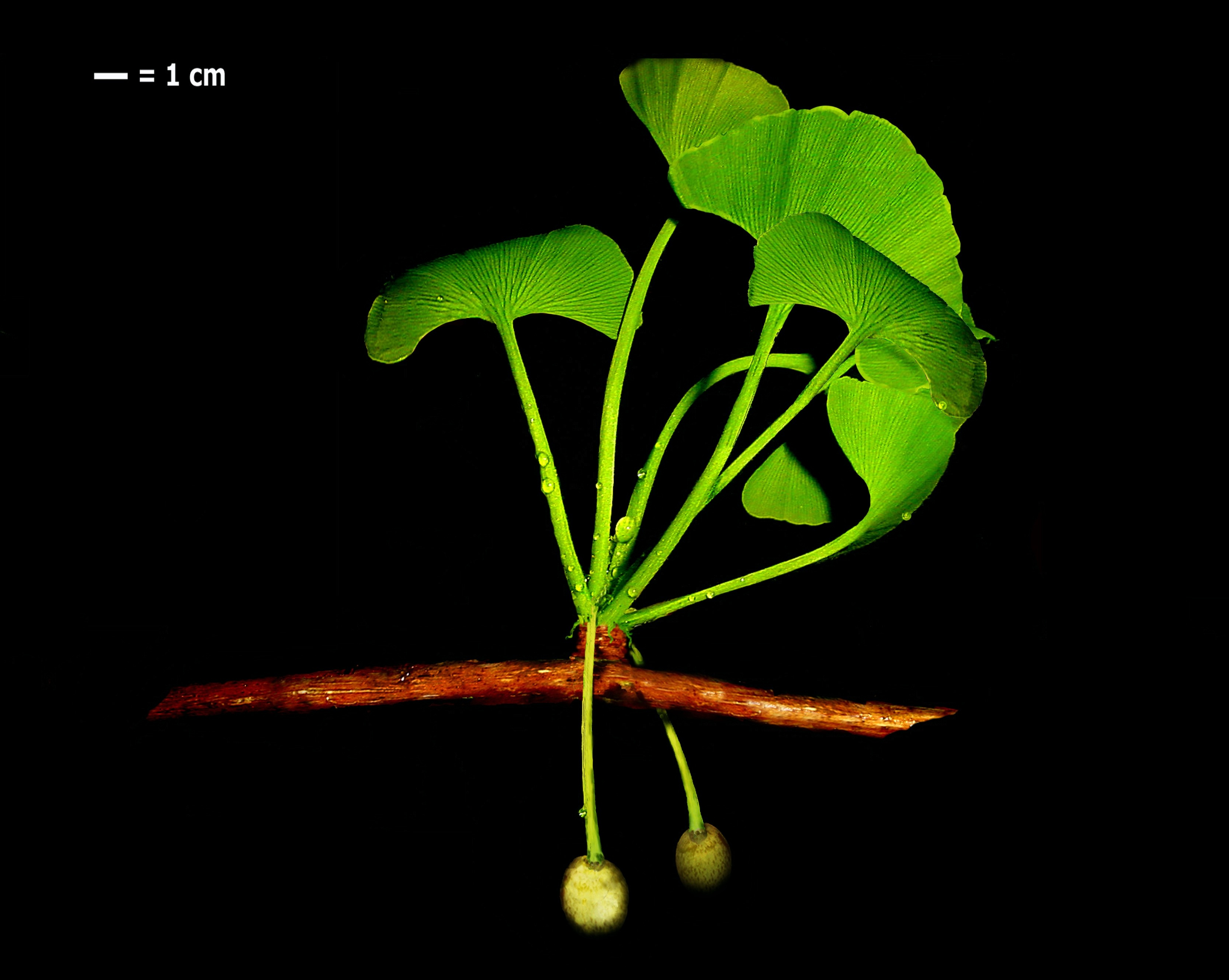
  - Restored foliage of the Late Cretaceous-Miocene ginkgo tree Ginkgo adiantoides
    †Ginkgo adiantoides - or unidentified loosely related form
- Gleichenia
- †Gryphaea
  - †Gryphaea arcuataeformis
  - †Gryphaea arcusta – or unidentified comparable form
  - †Gryphaea cymbium – or unidentified comparable form
  - †Gryphaea impressimarginata
  - †Gryphaea keilhaui – or unidentified comparable form
  - †Gryphaea rockymontana
- Guttulina
- †Gymnocodium
- †Hamulus – tentative report
- †Hebetoxyites
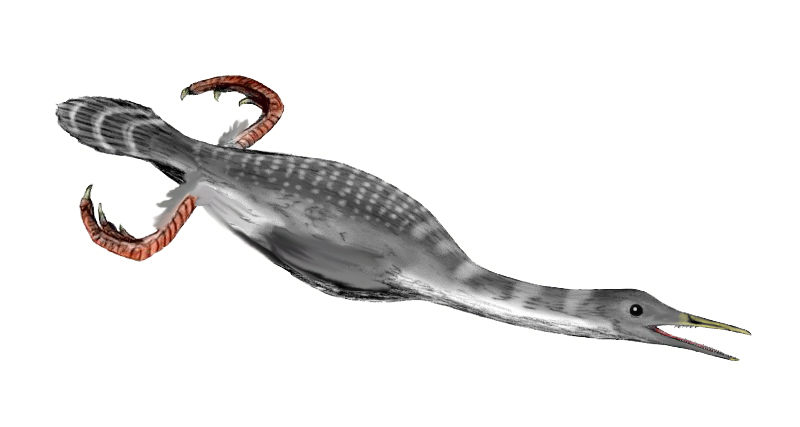
- Life restoration of the Late Cretaceous toothed bird Hesperornis
  †Hesperornis
- †Heterastridium
- †Hildaites – tentative report
- †Hypophylloceras
- †Inoceramus
  - †Inoceramus comancheanus
  - †Inoceramus cuvieri – or unidentified comparable form
  - †Inoceramus elegans – or unidentified related form
  - †Inoceramus eximius
  - †Inoceramus hobetsensis – or unidentified related form
  - †Inoceramus mamatensis – or unidentified related form
  - †Inoceramus naumanni – or unidentified comparable form
  - †Inoceramus porrectus – or unidentified comparable form
  - †Inoceramus schmidti
  - †Inoceramus subundatus – or unidentified comparable form
  - †Inoceramus teshioensis – or unidentified related form
  - †Inoceramus yokoyamai – or unidentified comparable form
- †Isastrea – tentative report
- Isognomon – tentative report
- †Joannites
- †Kepplerites
- †Kosmoceras
  - †Kosmoceras spinosum – or unidentified comparable form
- Lima
- †Lobites
- †Lucina
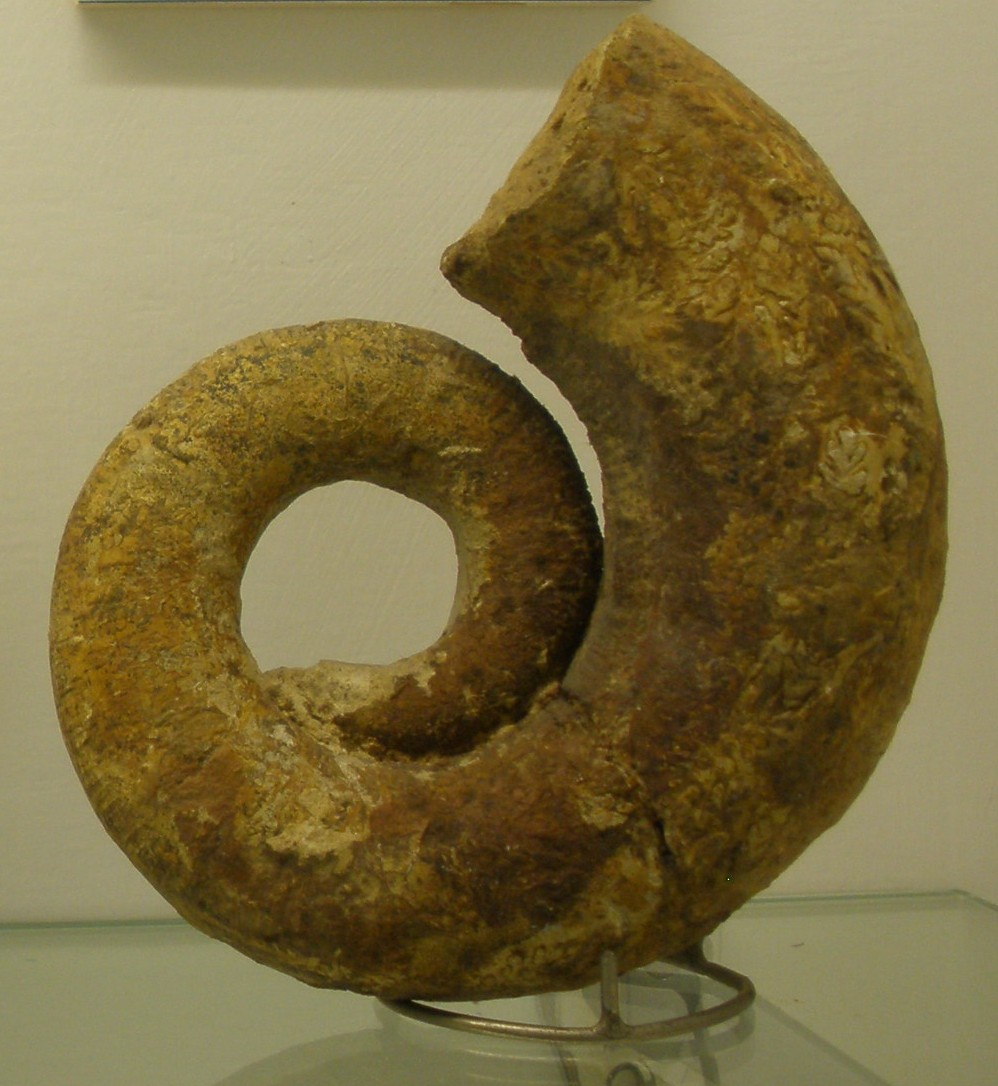
- Fossilized shell of the Early Jurassic-Late Cretaceous ammonoid cephalopod Lytoceras
  †Lytoceras
  - †Lytoceras eudesianum – or unidentified related form
  - †Lytoceras fimbriatum – or unidentified comparable form
- Margarites
- †Meekoceras
  - †Meekoceras gracilitatis
- †Metapolygnathus
- Milax – tentative report
- Milax
- †Modiolus
- †Muramotoceras
- †Murchisonia – tentative report
- †Myophorella
  - †Myophorella alaskaensis – type locality for species
  - †Myophorella argo
  - †Myophorella dawsoni
  - †Myophorella devexa
  - †Myophorella orientalis
  - †Myophorella packardi
  - †Myophorella tipperi
  - †Myophorella tuxedniensis – type locality for species
- †Myophoria
- †Mytilus
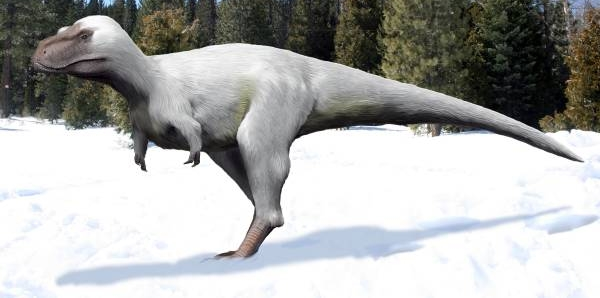
- Life restoration of the Late Cretaceous tyrannosaur Nanuqsaurus
  †Nanuqsaurus – type locality for genus
  - †Nanuqsaurus hoglundi – type locality for species
- Natica
- †Neogondolella
- †Neophylloceras
  - †Neophylloceras hetonaiense
  - †Neophylloceras ramosum
  - †Neophylloceras seresitense
- †Neospathodus – report made of unidentified related form or using admittedly obsolete nomenclature
- Nerita – tentative report
- Neritopsis
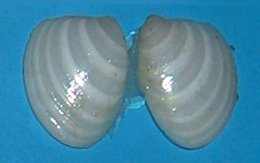
- Exterior of the shell of a modern specimen of the Early Ordovician-modern marine bivalve Nucula
  Nucula
  - †Nucula percrassa – or unidentified related form
- †Ophiceras
- Ostrea
- †Otoscaphites
- †Owenites
  - †Owenites koeneni – or unidentified comparable form
- †Oxycerites
- †Oxytoma
- †Pachydiscus
  - †Pachydiscus hazzardi – type locality for species
  - †Pachydiscus kamishakensis – type locality for species
  - †Pachydiscus obsoletiformis – type locality for species
  - †Pachydiscus ootacodensis
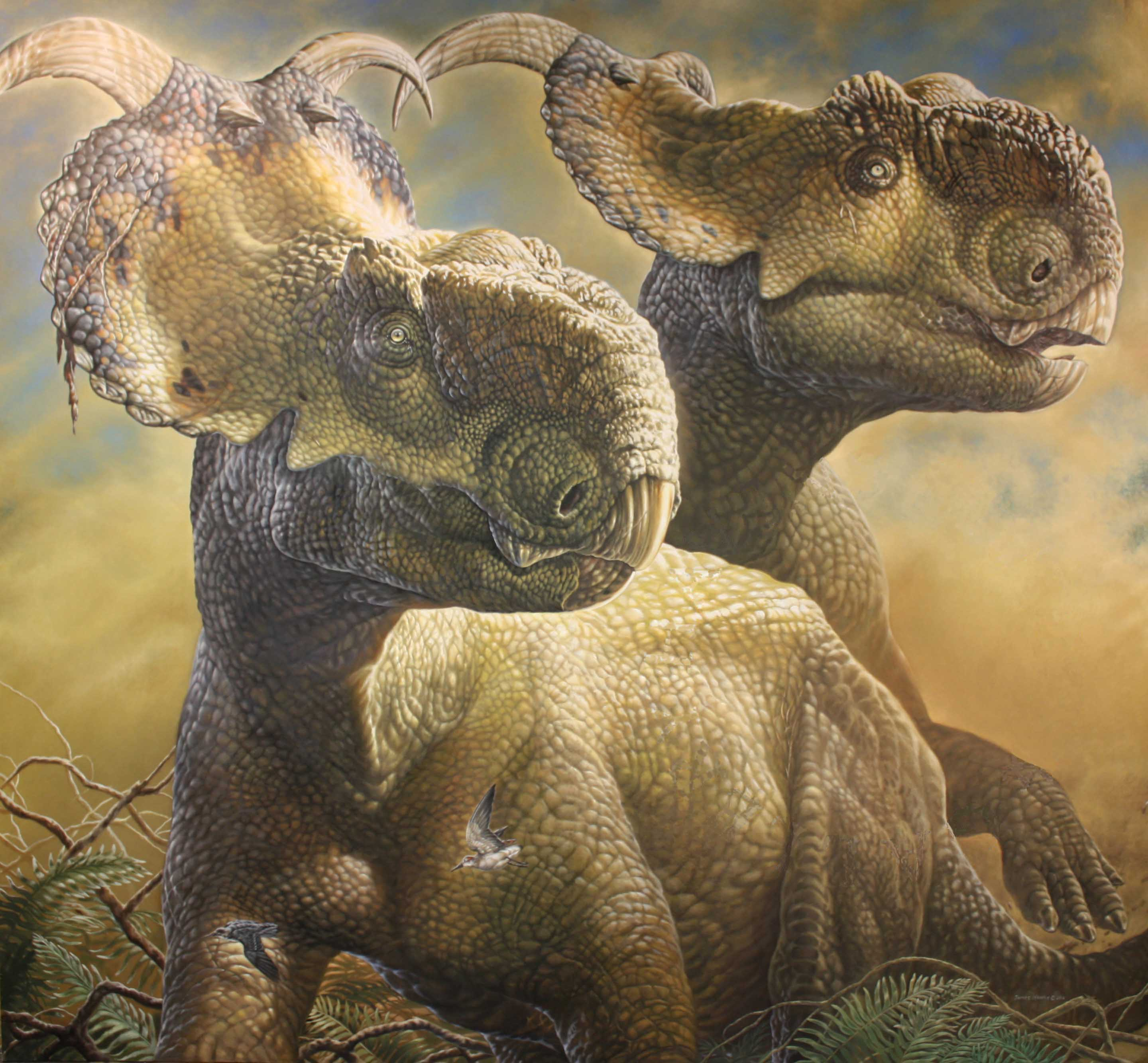
- Life restoration of two of the Late Cretaceous horned dinosaur Pachyrhinosaurus perotorum
  †Pachyrhinosaurus
  - †Pachyrhinosaurus perotorum – type locality for species
- †Pagiophyllum
- Panopea
- †Parkinsonia – tentative report
- Patella – tentative report
- †Pecten
- †Peregrinella
- Pholadomya
- †Phylloceras
- †Phyllopachyceras
  - †Phyllopachyceras chitinanum – type locality for species
  - †Phyllopachyceras forbesianum
  - †Phyllopachyceras shastalense – or unidentified comparable form
- †Pinna
- † Plagiostoma
- †Planolites – tentative report
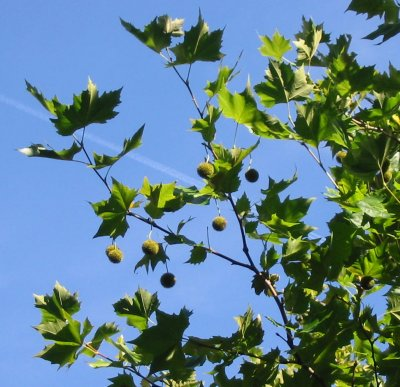
- Leaves and fruit of a living Platanus, or plane tree
  Platanus
- †Platyceras
- †Pleuroacanthites
- †Pleuronautilus
- Pleurotomaria
- Plicatula
- †Posidonia
- †Procerites
- †Protocardia
- †Protrachyceras
- †Pseudomelania – tentative report
- †Pseudotoites
- †Pteria
- †Pterophyllum
- †Puzosia
  - †Puzosia alaskana – type locality for species
- †Reineckeites
- †Rhynchonella
- †Sagenopteris – tentative report
- †Saurexallopus
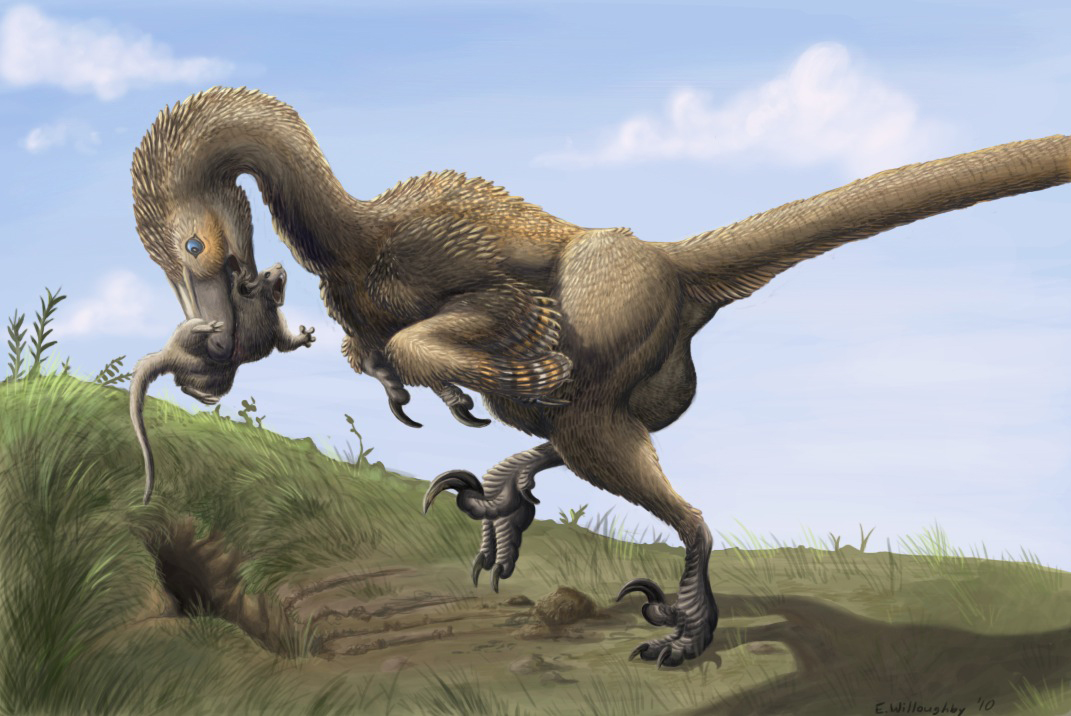
- Life restoration of the Late Cretaceous dromaeosaurid Saurornitholestes preying upon a multituberculate mammal
  †Saurornitholestes
  - †Saurornitholestes langstoni
- †Saxoceras – tentative report
- †Scaphites
- Scurria – tentative report
- Serpula
- †Sirenites
- Solecurtus – tentative report
- Solemya – tentative report
- †Solenopora
- †Sphenobaiera
  - †Sphenobaiera biloba - or unidentified loosely related form
  - †Sphenobaiera czekanowskiana - or unidentified loosely related form
  - †Sphenobaiera longifolia - or unidentified loosely related form
- †Spiriferina
  - †Spiriferina borealis – tentative report
  - †Spiriferina yukonensis – type locality for species
- †Spirocyclina – tentative report
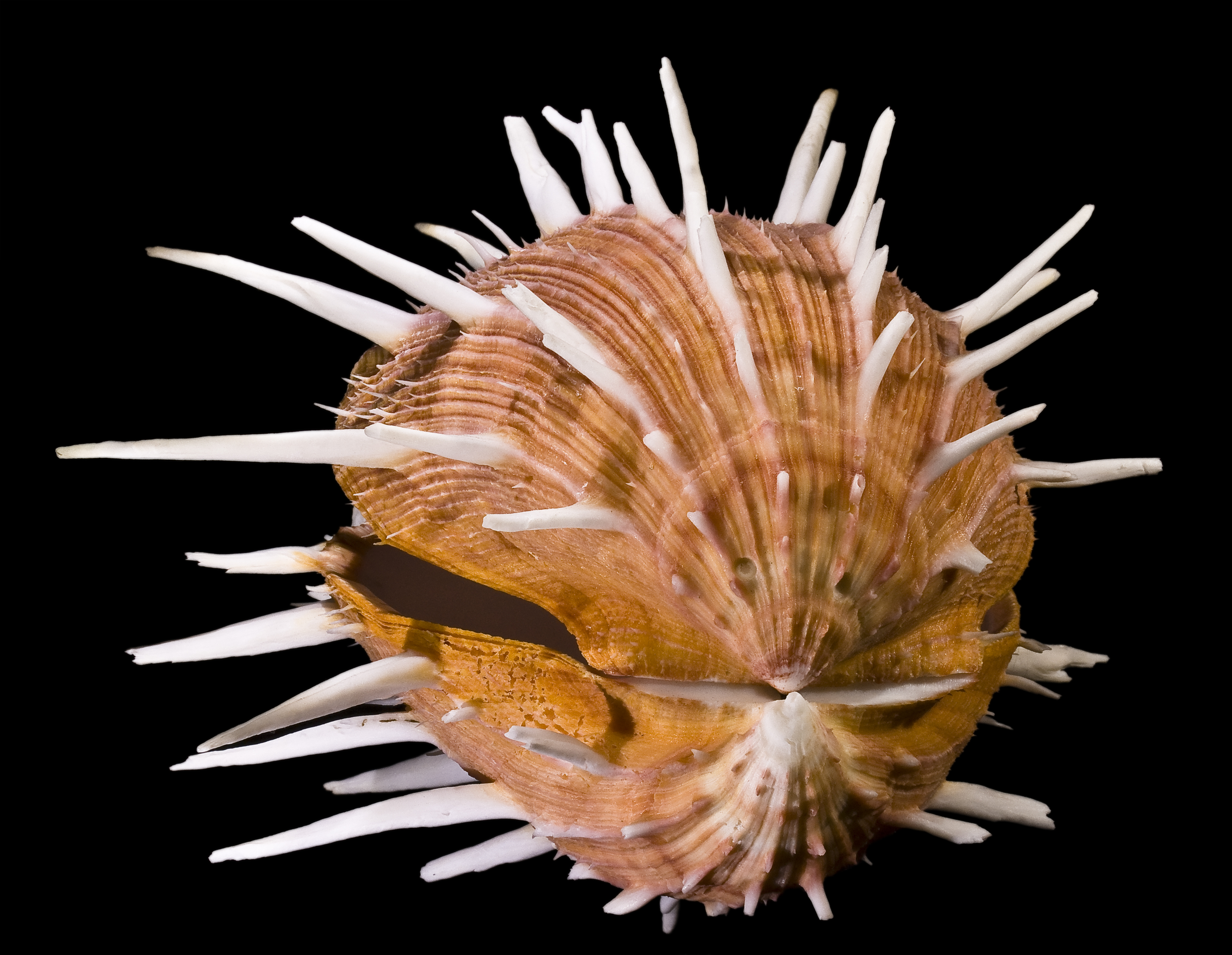
- Shell of a Spondylus, or spiny oyster
  Spondylus – tentative report
- Terebratula
- Teredolites
- †Thamnasteria
- Thracia
- †Trichites – report made of unidentified related form or using admittedly obsolete nomenclature
- †Trigonia
- Trochus
- †Troodon
  - †Troodon formosus
- Turbo – tentative report
- Turritella – tentative report
- †Tutcheria
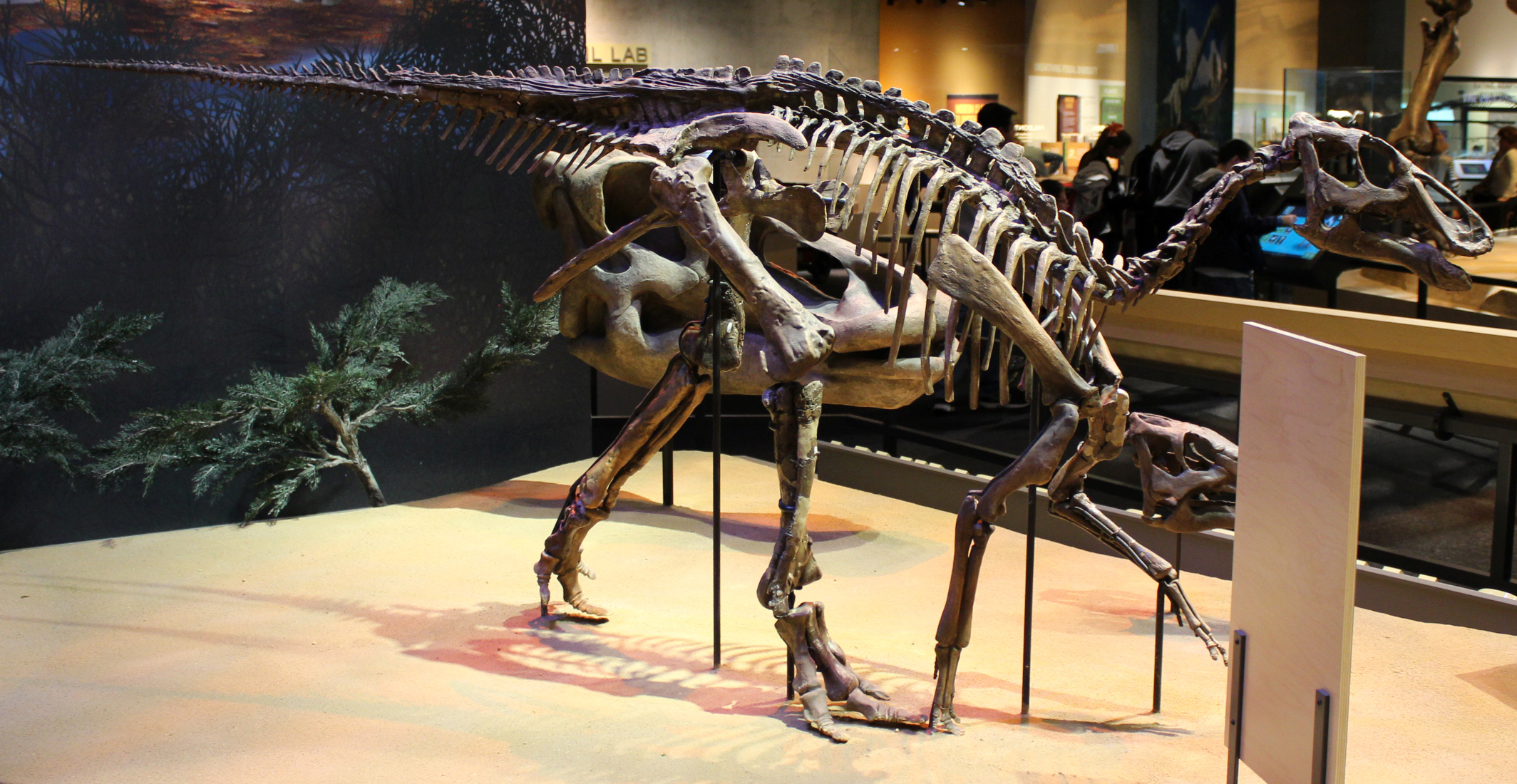
- Fossilized skeleton found in Alaska of the Late Cretaceous duck-billed dinosaur Ugrunaaluk
  †Ugrunaaluk – type locality for genus
  - †Ugrunaaluk kuukpikensis – type locality for species
- †Vermiceras
- †Worthenia
- †Wyomingites
- †Xenoceltites
  - †Xenoceltites cordilleranus
- †Xenocephalites
  - †Xenocephalites hartsocki – type locality for species
  - †Xenocephalites vicarius – type locality for species
- †Yezoites
- †Zetoceras

== Cenozoic ==
=== Selected Cenozoic taxa of Alaska ===
This list of the Cenozoic life of Alaska contains the various prehistoric life-forms whose fossilized remains have been reported from within the US state of Alaska and are between 66 million and 10,000 years of age.

- Acanthocardia
- Acirsa
- Acmaea
- Agonum
- †Ainus
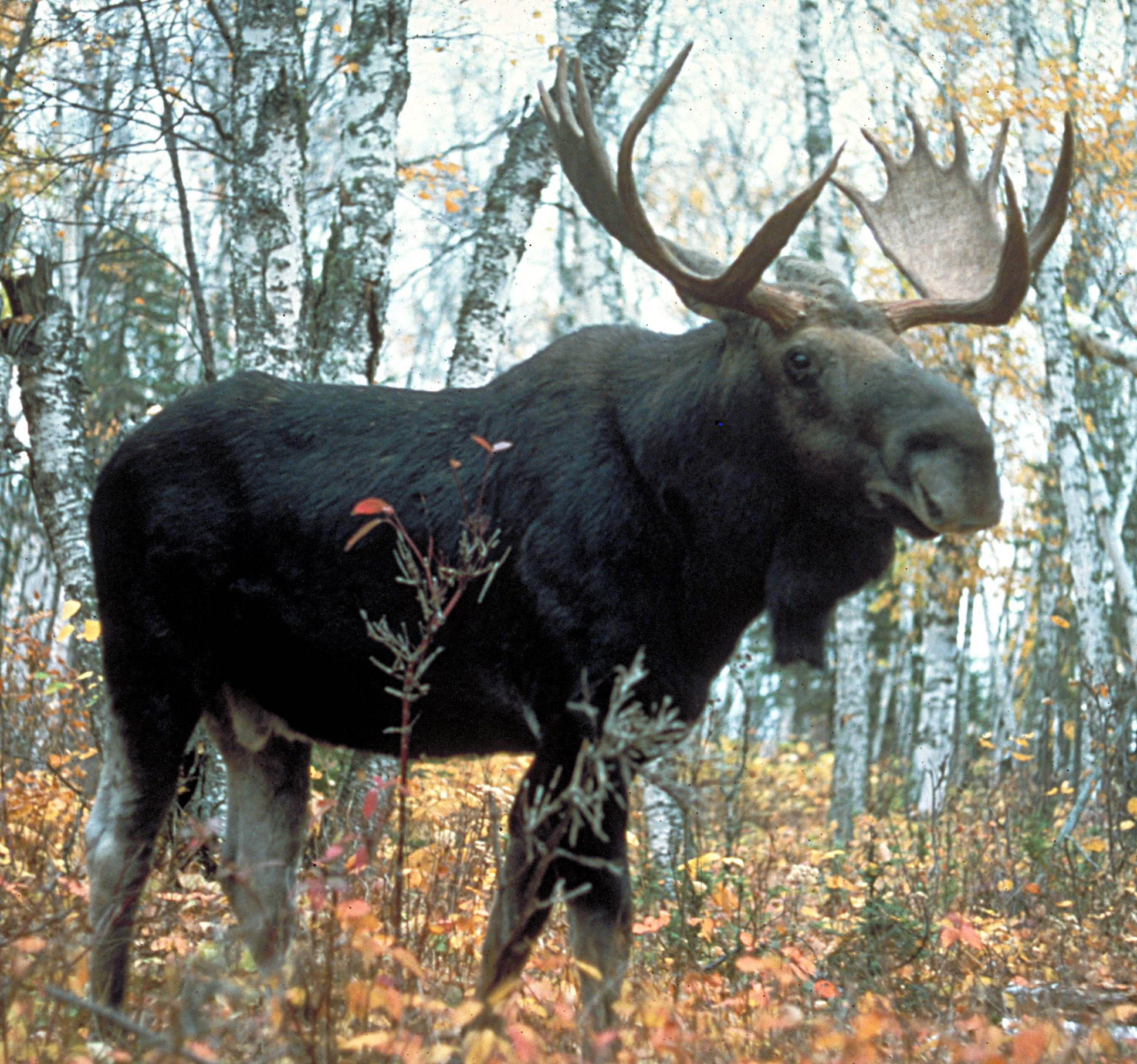
- A living Alces, or moose
  Alces
- Alnus
- Alopex
  - †Alopex lagopus
- Alvania
- Amara
- Amauropsis
- Ancistrolepis
- Angulus
- †Anomalisipho – tentative report
- Anomia – tentative report
- Aphaenogaster
- Arca
- Arctica
- †Arctodus
  - †Arctodus simus
- Argobuccinum
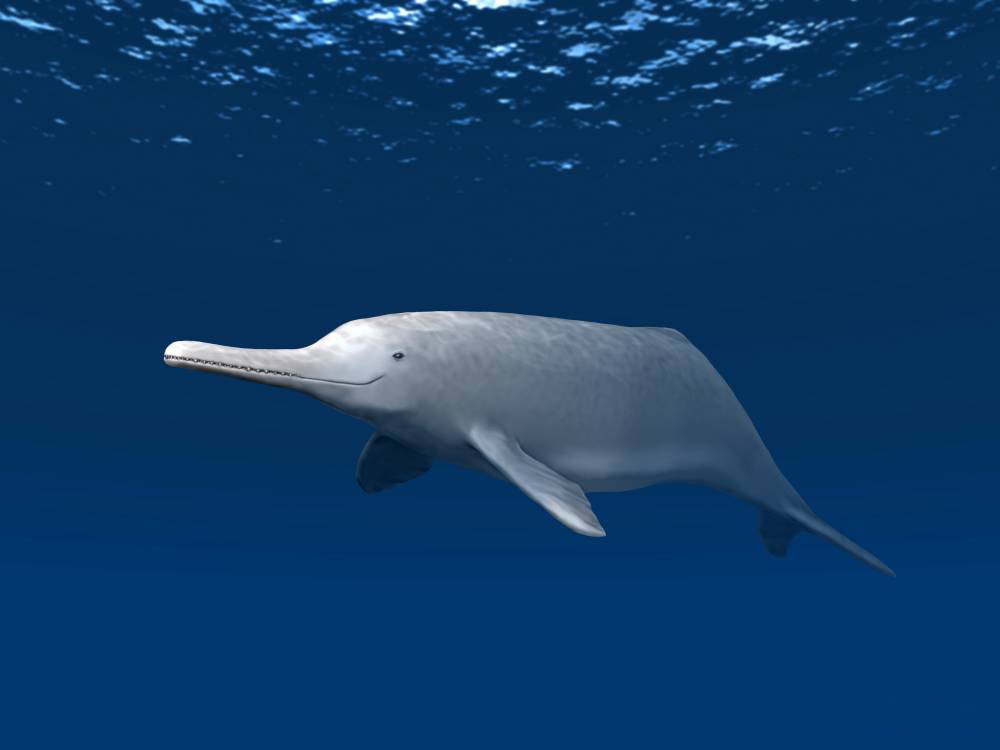
- Life restoration of the Oligocene river dolphin Arktocara
  †Arktocara – type locality for genus
  - †Arktocara yakataga – type locality for species
- Asaphidion
- Asinus
- Astarte
  - †Astarte borealis
- Astrangia
- †Aturia
- Balanus
  - †Balanus balanoides
  - †Balanus balanus
  - †Balanus crenatus
  - †Balanus nubilus – or unidentified comparable form
- Bembidion
- Beringius
  - †Beringius crebricostatus
- Betula
- Bibio
- Bison
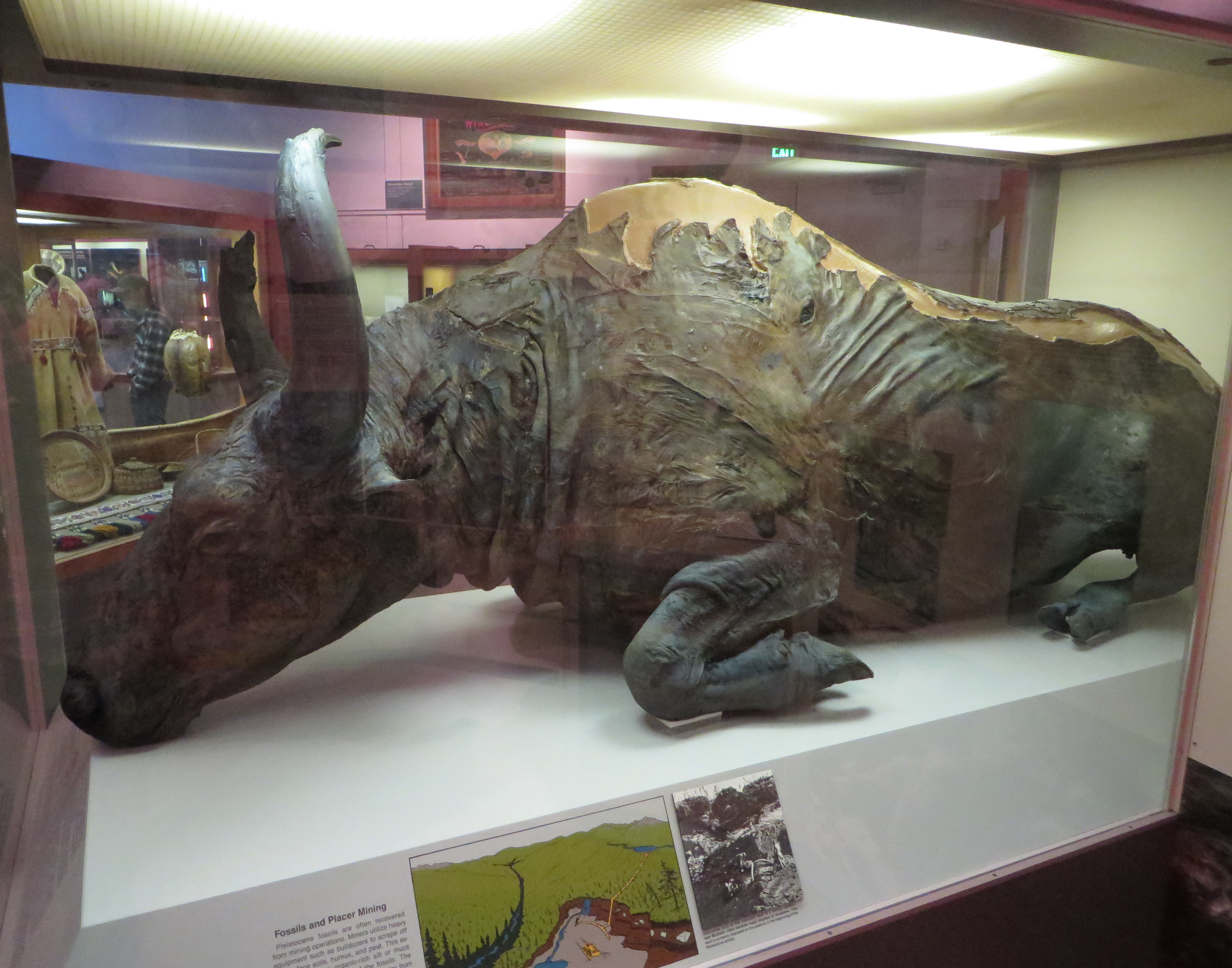
  - Mummified specimen found in Alaska of the Pleistocene-Holocene Bison priscus, or steppe bison. This specimen, known as "Blue Babe" after the blue ox of Paul Bunyan folklore, derives its unusual coloration from a chemical reaction between the phosphorus in its skin and iron in the surrounding soil to produce a coating of vivianite.
    †Bison priscus
- †Bootherium
  - †Bootherium bombifrons
- Boreotrophon
  - †Boreotrophon rotundatus – or unidentified comparable form
- Brachidontes
- †Branchioplax
  - †Branchioplax washingtoniana
- Buccella
- Buccinum
  - †Buccinum angulosum
  - †Buccinum glaciale
- Bulbus
  - †Bulbus fragilis
- Cadulus
- Calliostoma
- Callorhinus
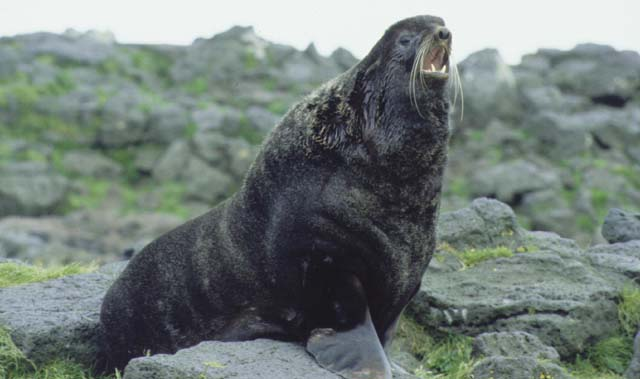
  - A living Callorhinus ursinus, or northern fur seal
    †Callorhinus ursinus
- Calyptraea
- Camponotus
- Cancellaria
- Canis
  - †Canis lupus
- Carabus
  - †Carabus nemoralis – or unidentified comparable form
  - †Carabus truncaticollis – or unidentified comparable form
- †Carex
- Caryophyllia
- Cassidulina
- Castalia
- Castanea
- Cepheus
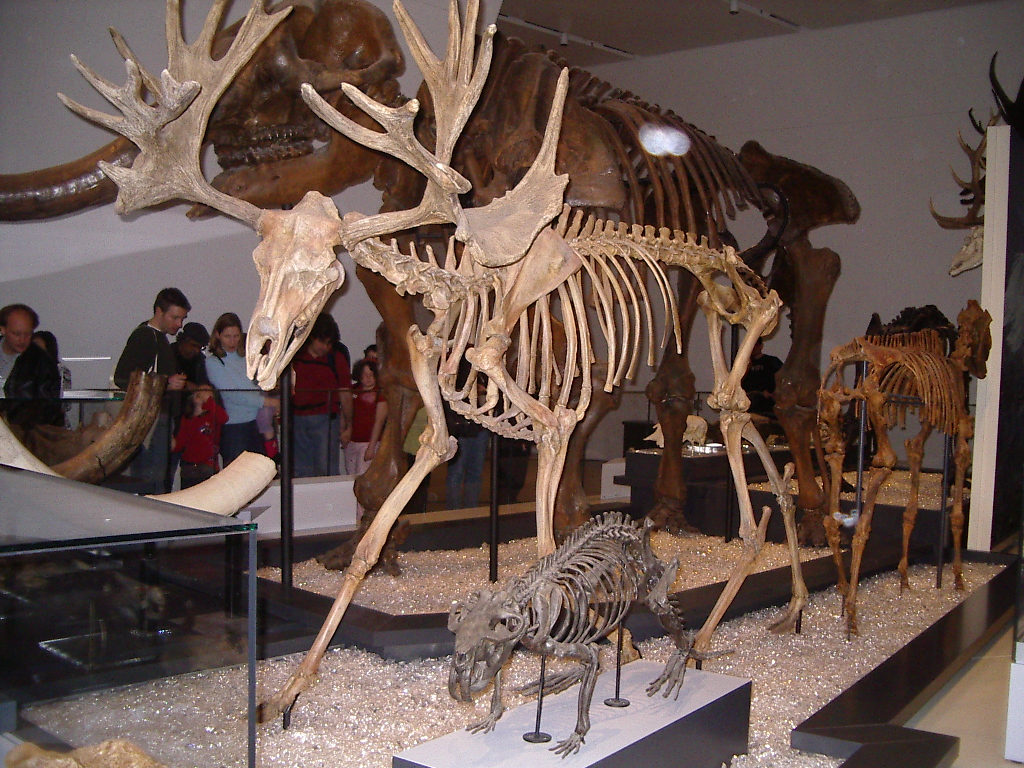
- Fossilized skeleton of the Pliocene-Pleistocene cervid Cervalces, or the stag moose
  †Cervalces
- Cervus
  - †Cervus elaphus
- Ceutorhynchus – tentative report
- Chama
- Chione
- Chlamys
  - †Chlamys islandica
  - †Chlamys rubida
- †Chrysodomus – tentative report
- Chrysolina
- Cibicides
- Cingula
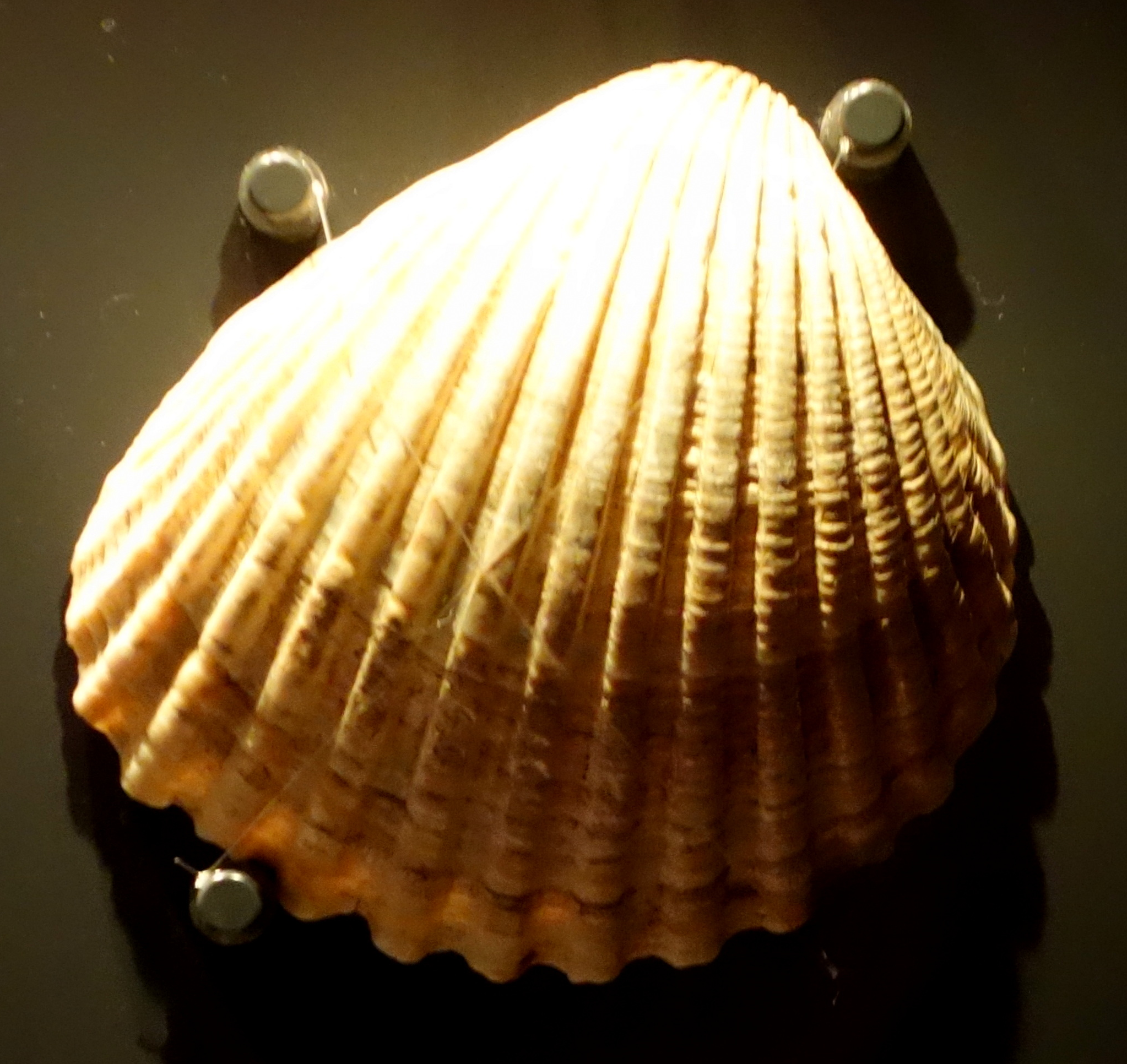
- Shell of a Clinocardium cockle
  Clinocardium
  - †Clinocardium nuttallii
- Colus
- Corbicula
- Corbula
- †Cornwallius
- †Corylus
- Crenella
- Crepidula
- Cryptonatica
  - †Cryptonatica affinis
- Cyclocardia
- Cylichna
- Cyperus
- Delphinapterus – tentative report
- Dentalium
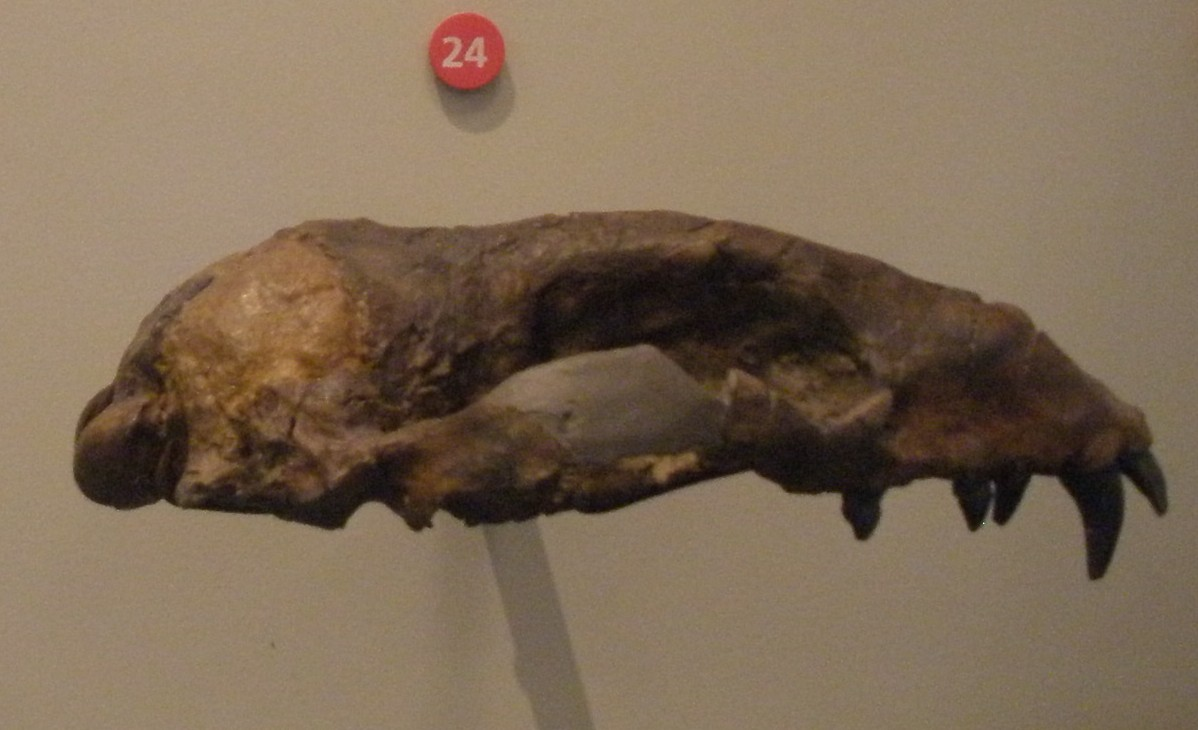
- Fossilized cranium of the Miocene seal Desmatophoca
  †Desmatophoca – tentative report
- Diacheila
- Dicrostonyx
- Dioon
- Dyschirius
- Echinarachnius
- Echinophoria
- Elphidium
- Enhydra
- Enicmus
- †Epipremnum
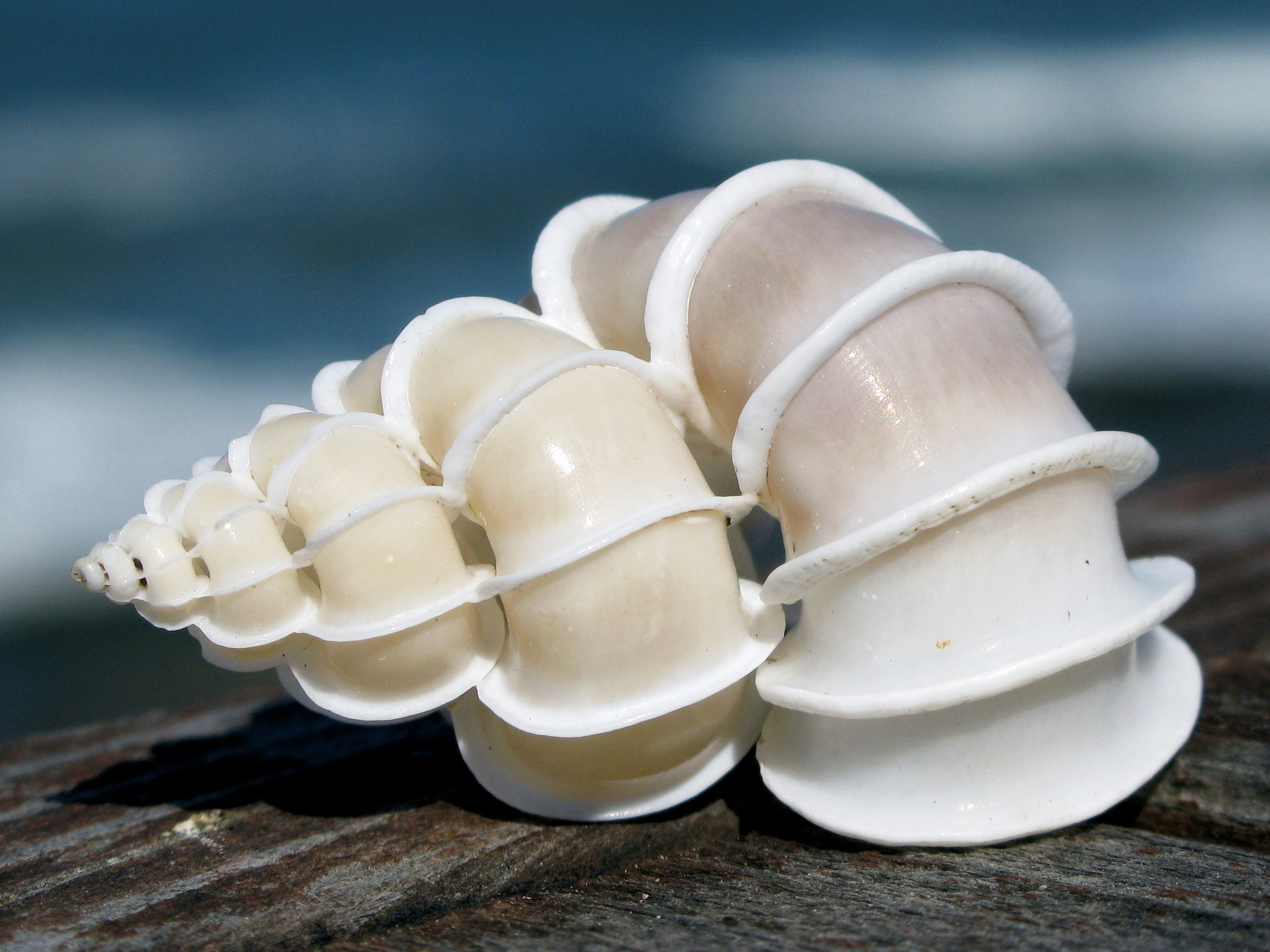
- Shell of an Epitonium wentletrap sea snail
  Epitonium
- Equus
  - †Equus alaskae
- Erignathus
  - †Erignathus barbatus
- Erigone
- Eschrichtius
- Eumetopias
- †Eumorphocorystes
- Euspira
  - †Euspira pallida
- Evalea
- †Exilia – tentative report
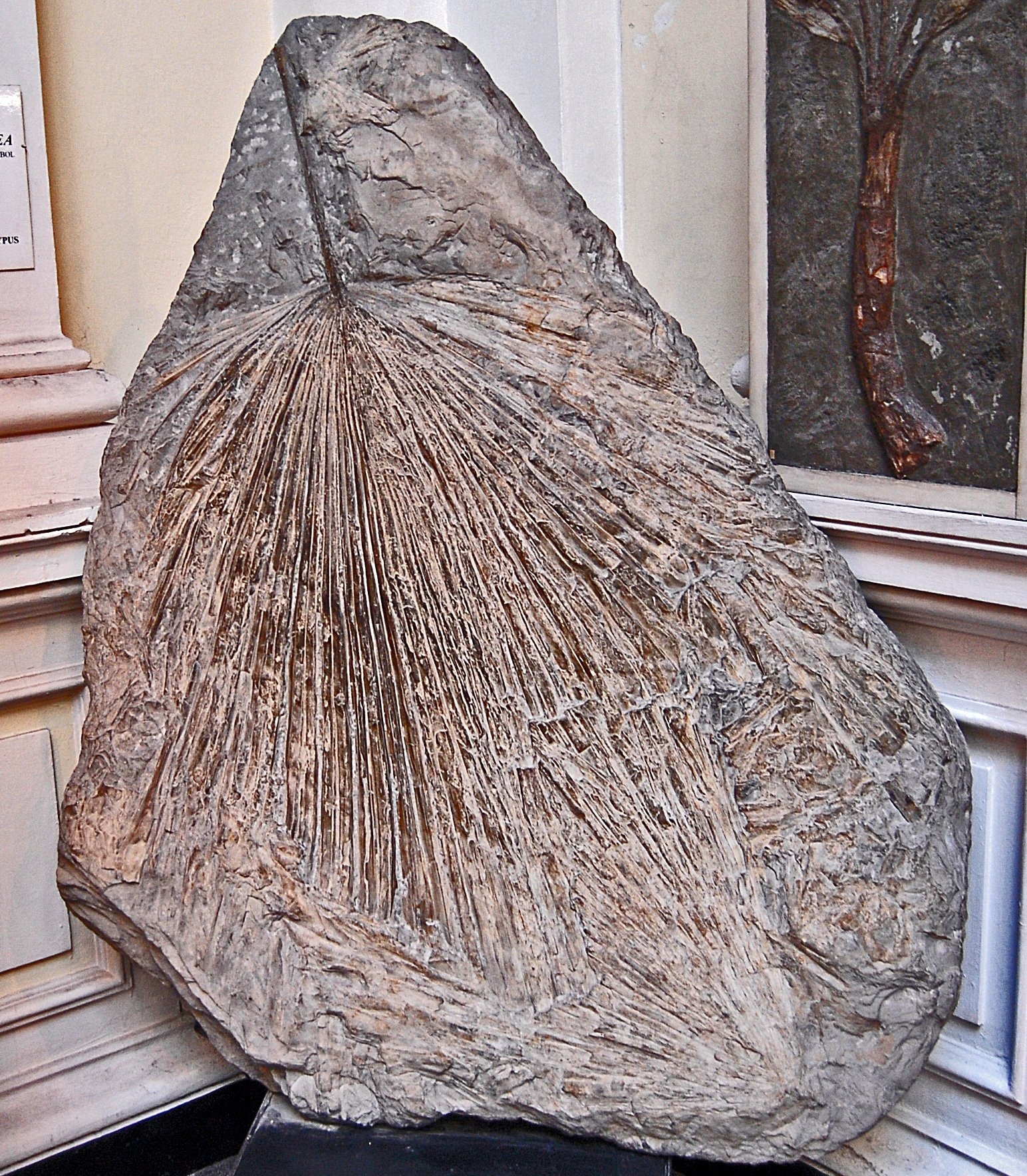
- Fossilized foliage of the Cretaceous-Oligocene flowering plant Flabellaria
  †Flabellaria
- Fulgoraria
- Gari
- Georissus
- Globigerina
  - †Globigerina bulloides – or unidentified related form
- Glycymeris
- Helophorus
- Hiatella
  - †Hiatella arctica
- Hinnites – tentative report
- Histriophoca
  - †Histriophoca fasciata
- Homalopoma – tentative report
- †Hydrodamalis
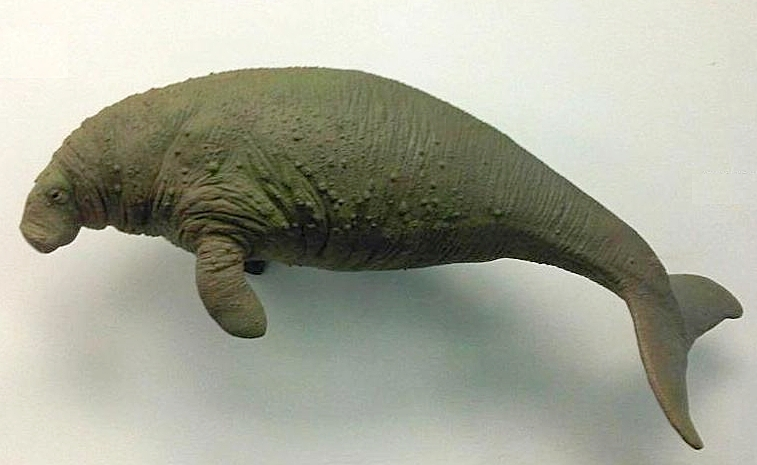
  - Restorative model of the Pleistocene-Holocene manatee relative Hydrodamalis gigas, or Steller's sea cow
    †Hydrodamalis gigas
- Isurus
- †Kolponomos – or unidentified comparable form
- Lasiopodomys
- Lathrobium
- Laurus
- Leistus
- Lemmus
  - †Lemmus sibiricus
- Leptothorax
- Leukoma
- Limatula
- Liocyma
  - †Liocyma fluctuosa
- Liomesus
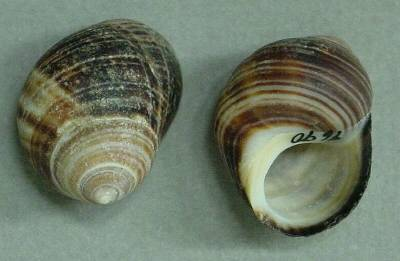
- Shells in differing orientation of a Littorina sea snail, or periwinkle
  Littorina
- †Lora
- Lunatia
- Lyonsia
- Macoma
  - †Macoma balthica – or unidentified related form
- Macrocallista – tentative report
- Magnolia
- †Mammut
- †Mammuthus
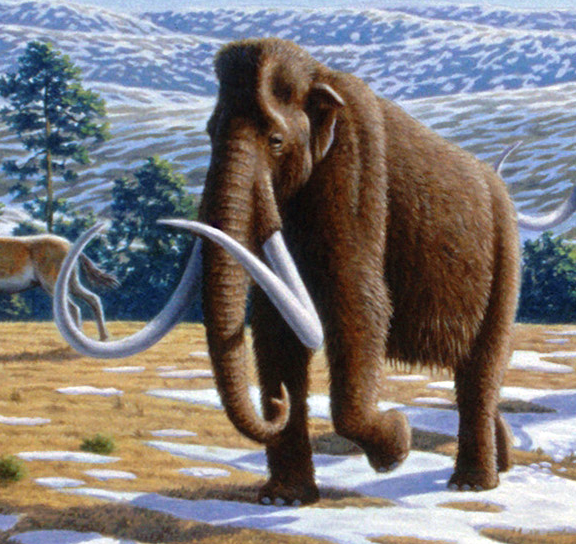
  - Restoration of a herd of Mammuthus primigenius, or wooly mammoths
    †Mammuthus primigenius
- Margarites
- Marmota
- Martesia – tentative report
- Mathilda
- Messor
- †Metacarcinus
- Micropeplus
- Microtus
- Modiolus
- Musculus
  - †Musculus niger
- †Mya
  - †Mya arenaria – or unidentified comparable form
  - †Mya truncata
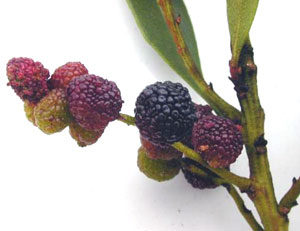
- Fruit of a living Myrica, or firetree
  Myrica
- Mytilus
  - †Mytilus edulis
- Natica
- Nebria
- Neoconorbina
- Neptunea
  - †Neptunea heros
  - †Neptunea lyrata
  - †Neptunea ventricosa
- Neverita
- Notiophilus
- Nucula
- Ochotona
  - †Ochotona whartoni
- Odobenus
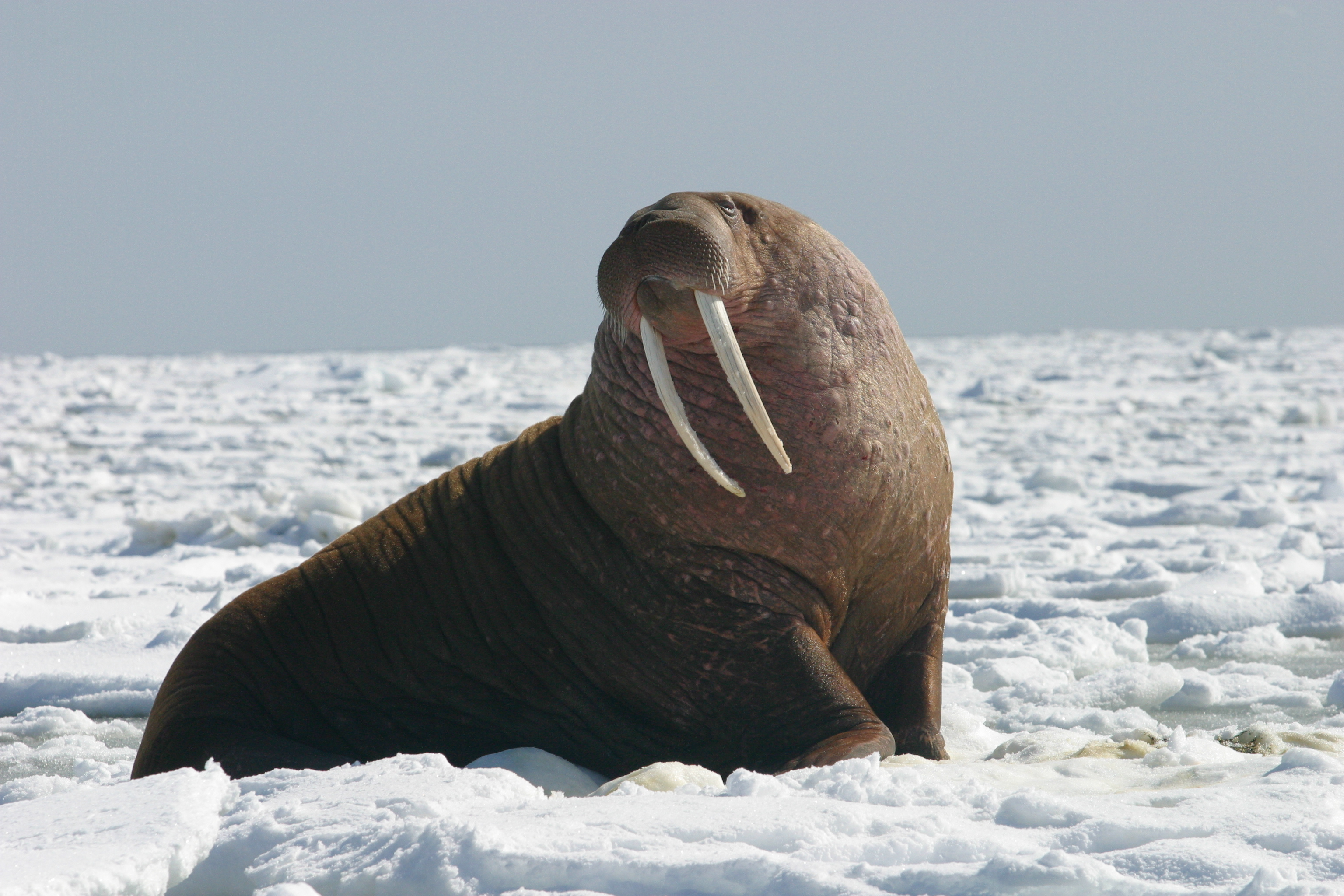
  - A living Odobenus rosmarus, or walrus
    †Odobenus rosmarus
- Oenopota
  - †Oenopota candida
- †Osmunda
- Ostrea
- Ovibos
  - †Ovibos moschatus
- Ovis
  - †Ovis dalli – tentative report
- †Oxytoma
- Pagophilus
- Palliolum
- Pandora
- Papyridea
- Patrobus
- †Perse
- Phenacomys
- Phoca
  - †Phoca hispida
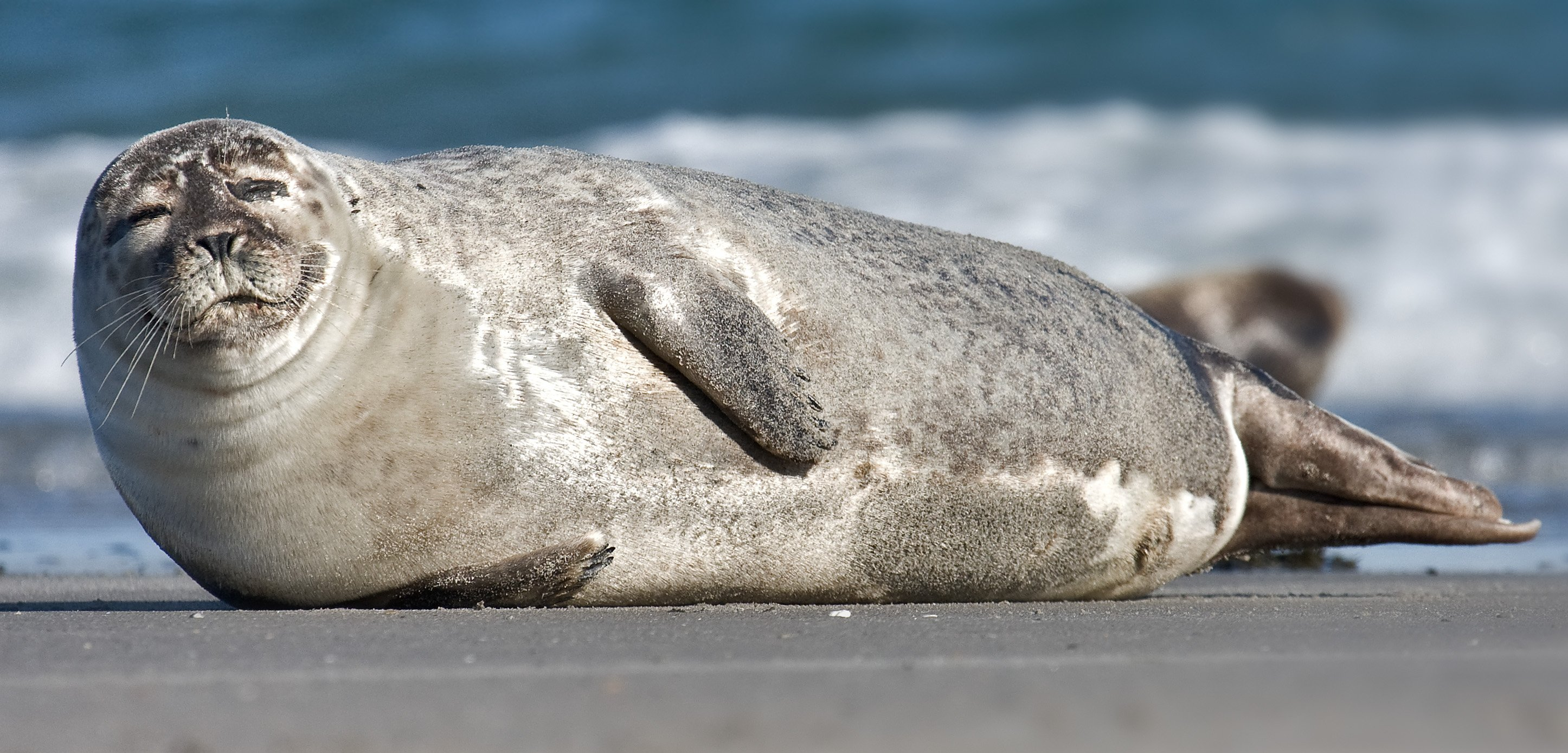
  - A living Phoca vitulina, or harbor seal
    †Phoca vitulina
- Picea
  - †Picea glauca
  - †Picea mariana
  - †Picea sitchensis – or unidentified comparable form
- Pinus
  - †Pinus monticola
- Pitar
- †Planera
- Plicifusus
  - †Pododesmus macrochisma
- Polinices
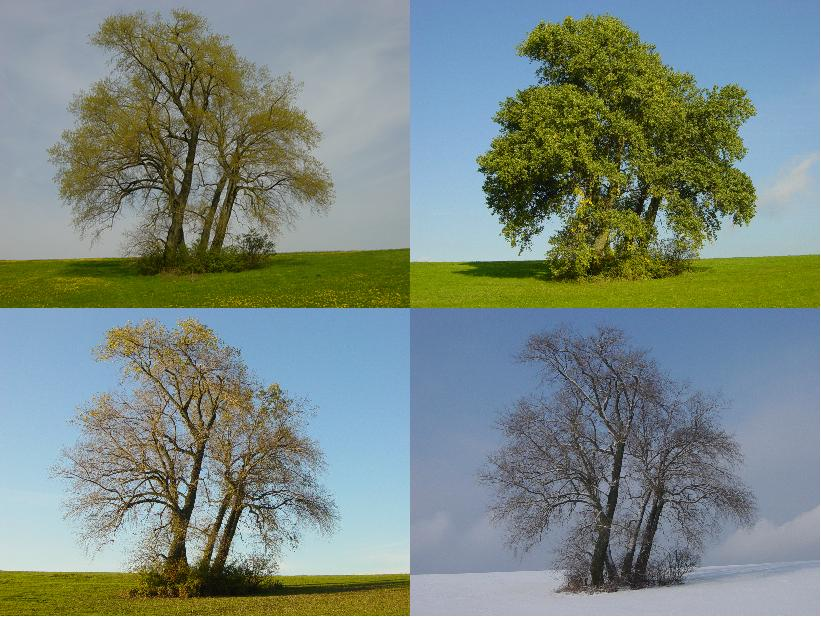
- Montage of photographs in spring (top left), summer (top right), autumn (bottom left), and winter (bottom right) of Populus, or poplar tree
  Populus
- Portlandia
- †Portunites
- †Predicrostonyx
  - †Predicrostonyx hopkinsi
- †Protocardia – tentative report
- †Protochelydra
  - †Protochelydra zangerli – or unidentified comparable form
- Protothaca
- Pteris
- Pterostichus
- Puncturella
  - †Puncturella longifissa
- Purpura
- Pusa – or unidentified related form
  - †Pusa hispida
- Pyrgo
- Pyrulofusus
- Quercus
- Quinqueloculina
- Rangifer
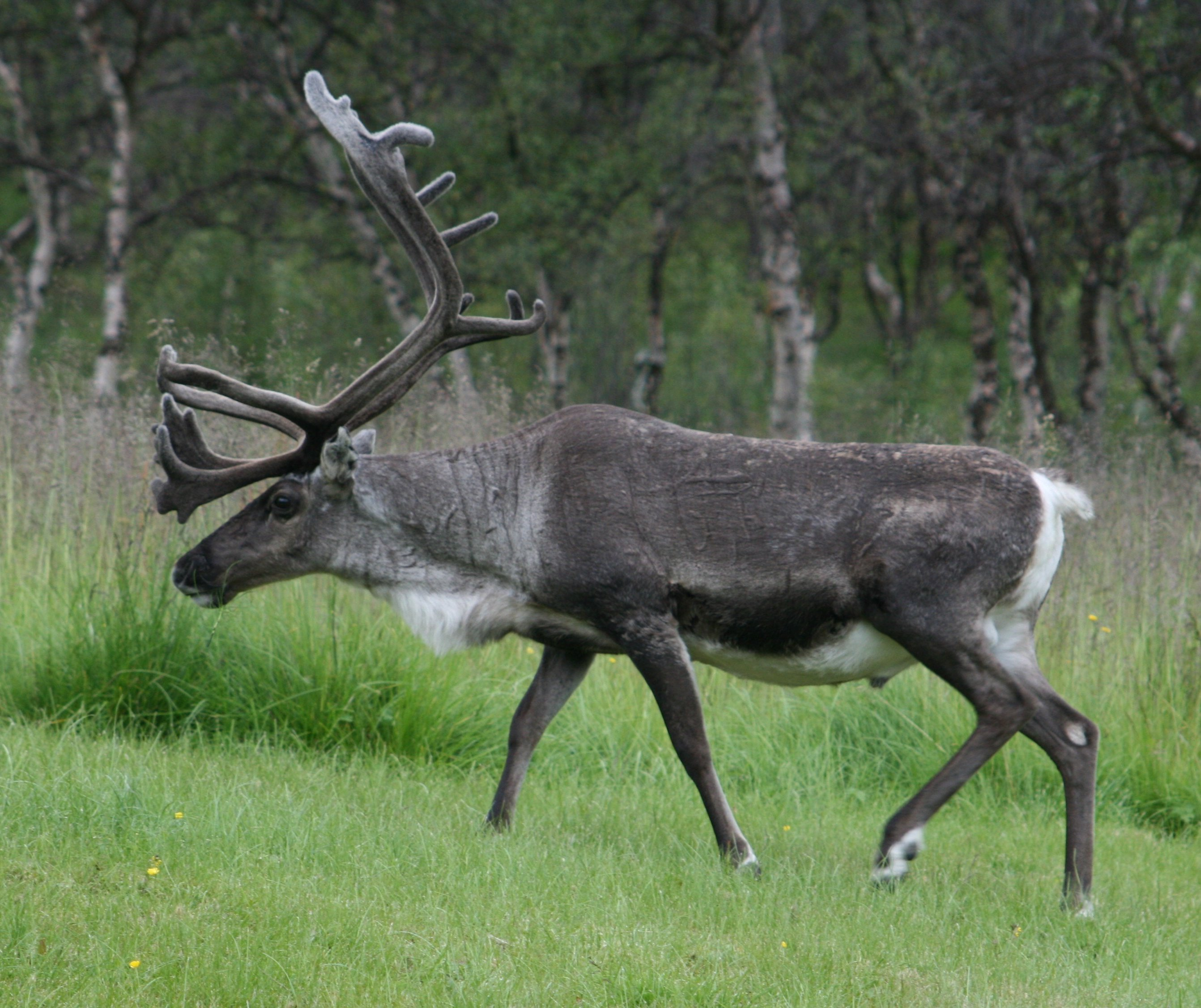
  - A living Rangifer tarandus, or reindeer
    †Rangifer tarandus
- Rhabdus
- Rosalina
- †Rotalia
- Saiga
- Saxidomus
- Scaphander
  - †Scaphander lignarius – or unidentified comparable form
- †Scutella
- Sequoia
- Serripes
  - †Serripes groenlandicus
- Siliqua
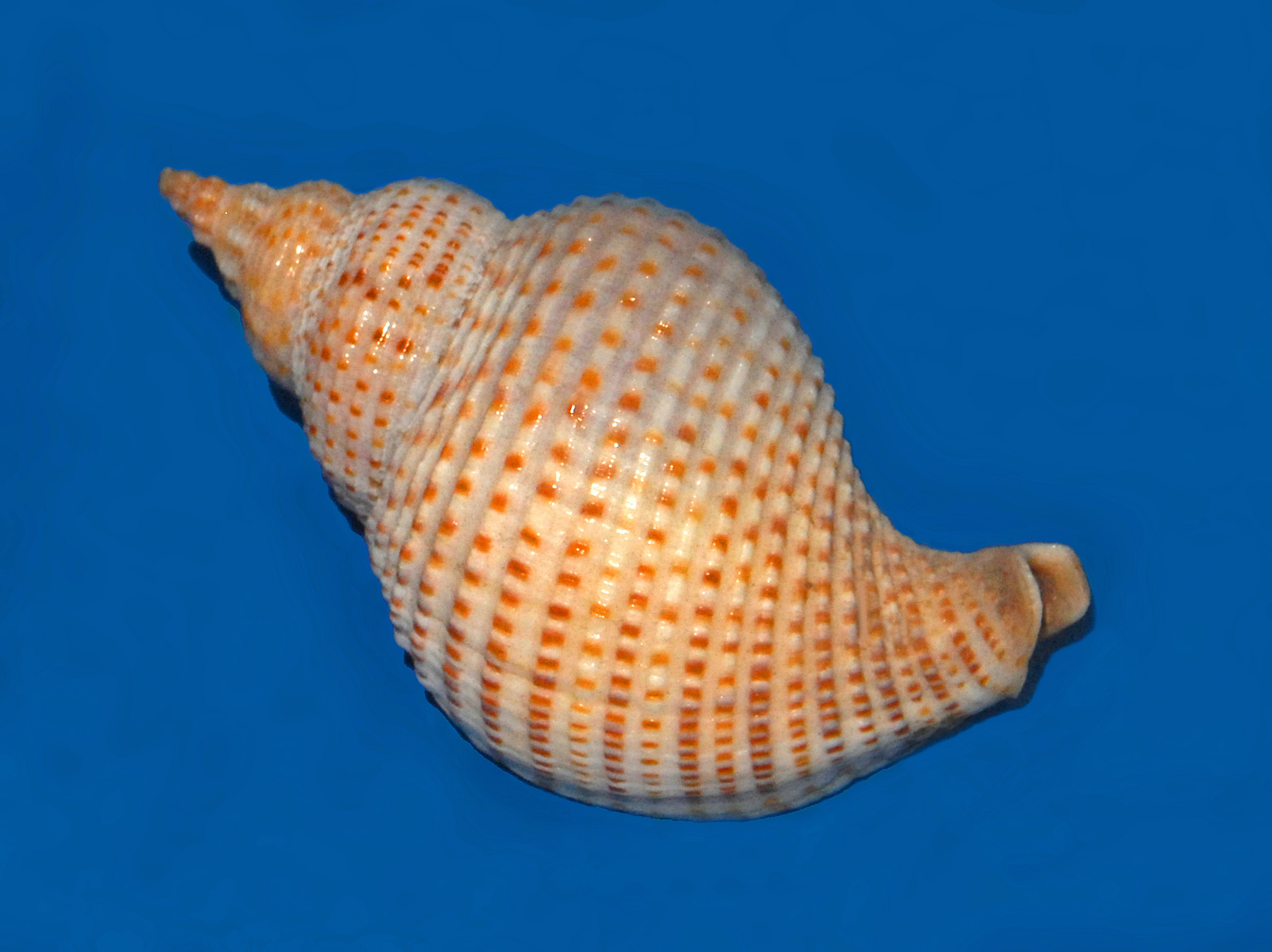
- Shell of the whelk sea snail Siphonalia
  Siphonalia
- Sorex
- Spermophilus
  - †Spermophilus undulatus
- Spirorbis
- Spirotropis
- Spisula
- Stenus
- Strongylocentrotus
  - †Strongylocentrotus droebachiensis
- †Symphoricarpos
- Tachyrhynchus
  - †Tachyrhynchus erosus
- Taxodium
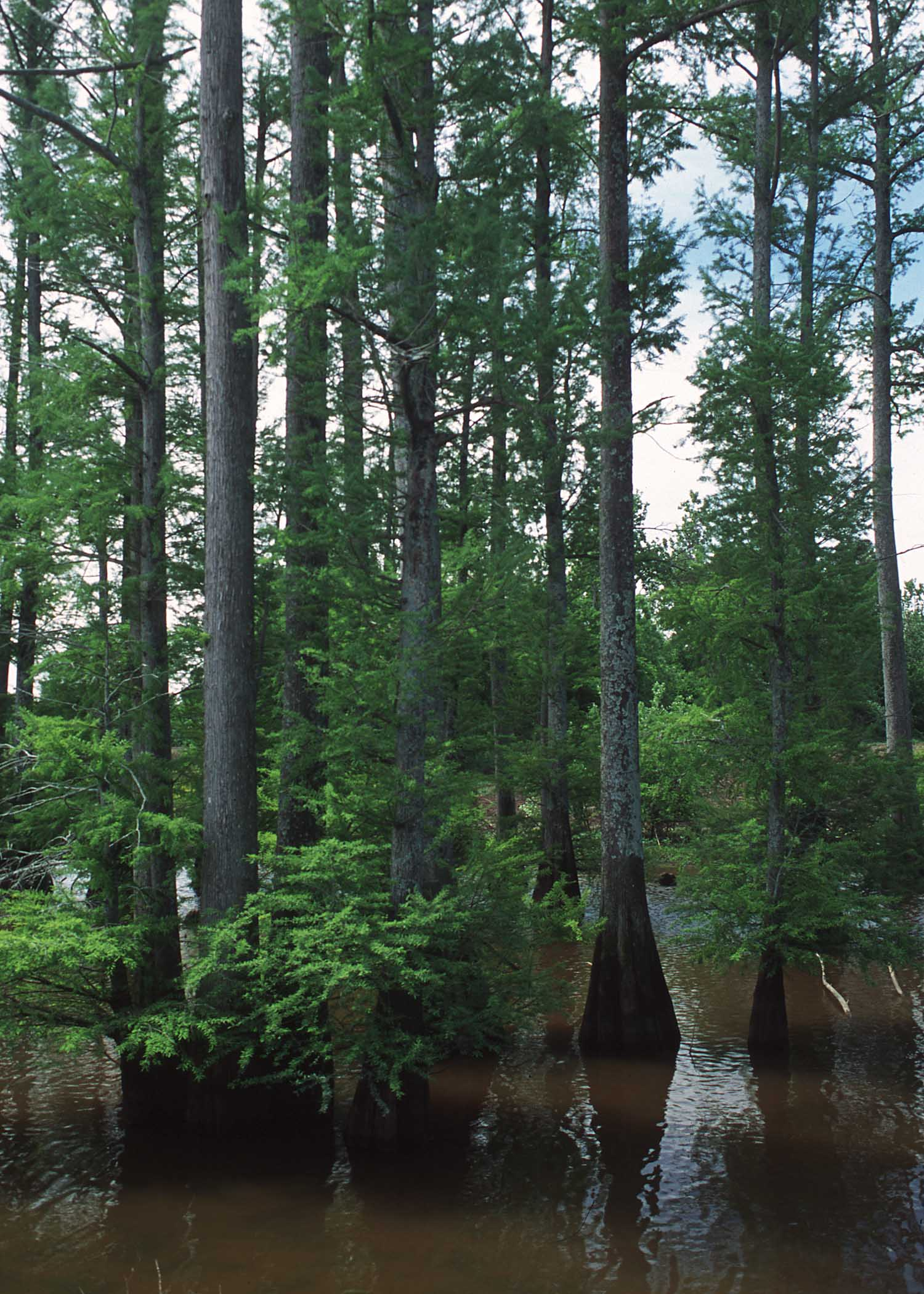
  - Living Taxodium distichum, or bald cypresses
    †Taxodium distichum
- Tellina
- Terebratula
- Thracia
- Thyasira
- Tonicella
- Trichotropis
  - †Trichotropis bicarinata
- †Tsuga
  - †Tsuga heterophylla
- Turritella
- Ulmus
- Ursus
- †Vaccinium
- Venericardia
- Vitis
- Volutopsius
- Vulpes
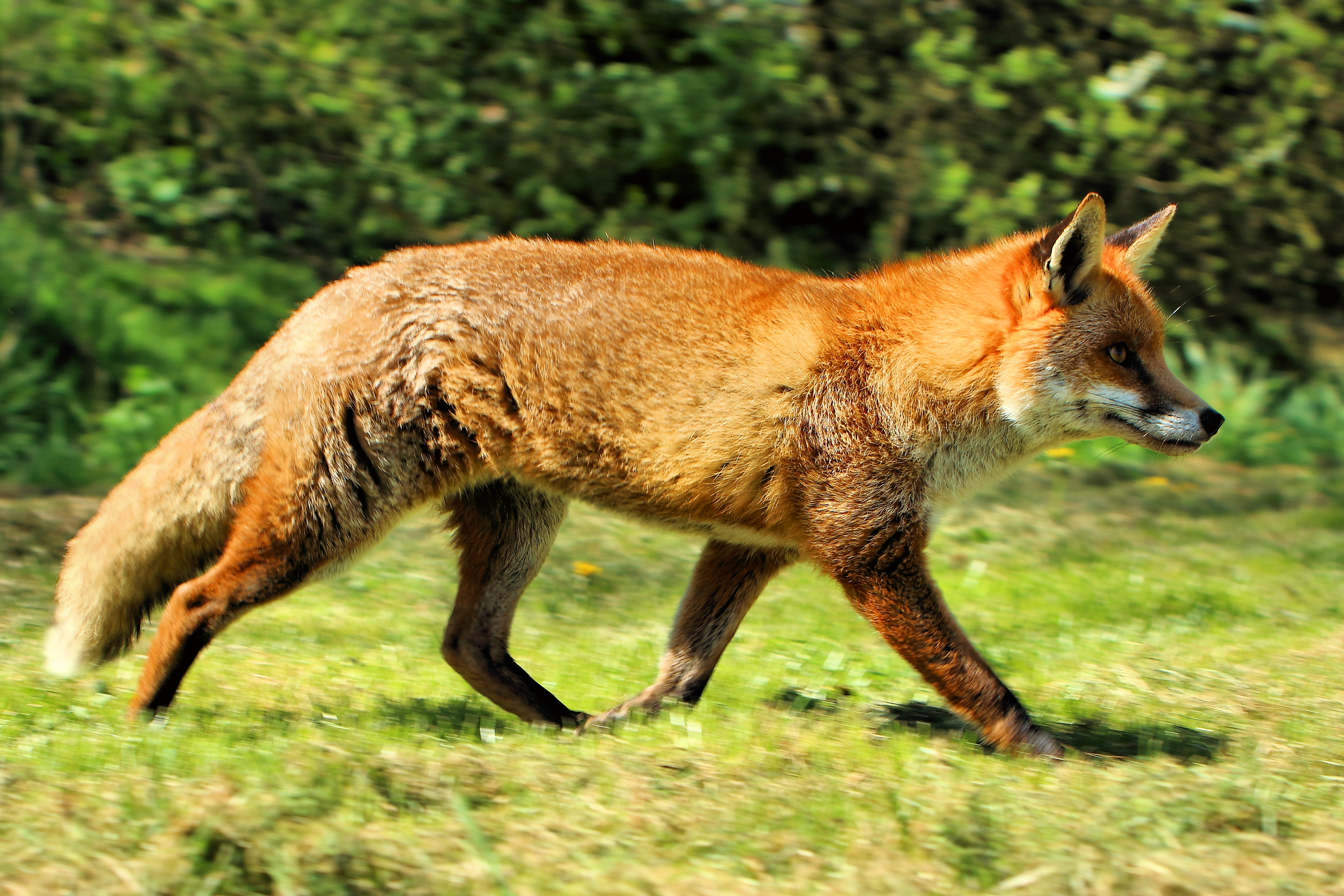
  - A living Vulpes vulpes, or red fox
    †Vulpes vulpes
- Xysticus
- Yoldia
