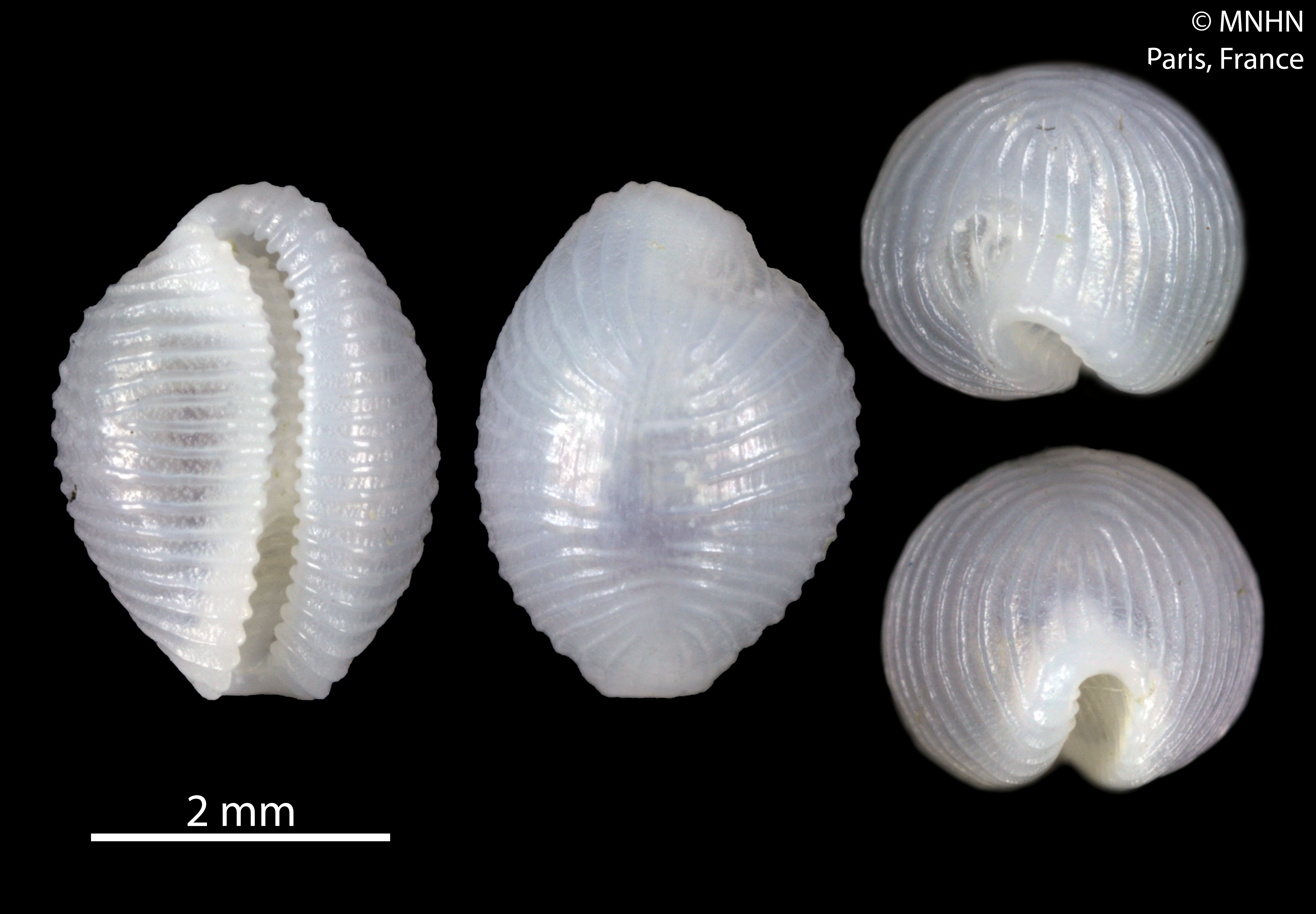
- Shell of Trivirostra hyalina (specimen at MNHN, Paris)

Scientific classification
- Kingdom: Animalia
- Phylum: Mollusca
- Class: Gastropoda
- Subclass: Caenogastropoda
- Order: Littorinimorpha
- Superfamily: Cypraeoidea
- Family: Triviidae
- Genus: Trivirostra; Jousseaume, 1884

Type species
- Cypraea scabriuscula Gray, 1827

= Trivirostra =

Genus of gastropods

Trivirostra is a genus of small sea snails, marine gastropod mollusks in the family Triviidae, the false cowries or trivias.

== Species ==
Species within the genus Trivirostra include:

- Trivirostra akroterion (Cate, 1979)
- Trivirostra angulata Fehse, 2017
- Trivirostra angustata Fehse, 2017
- Trivirostra bitou (Pallary, 1912)
- Trivirostra bocki Schilder, 1944
- Trivirostra boswellae Cate, 1979
- Trivirostra boucancanotica Fehse & Grego, 2002
- Trivirostra catina Fehse, 2017
- Trivirostra clariceae Cate, 1979
- Trivirostra corrugata (Pease, 1868)
- Trivirostra declivis Fehse, 2015
- Trivirostra dekkeri Fehse & Grego, 2009
- Trivirostra directa Fehse, 2017
- Trivirostra dolichis Fehse, 2017
- Trivirostra edgari (Shaw, 1909)
- Trivirostra elongata Ma, 1997
- Trivirostra ginae Fehse & Grego, 2002
- Trivirostra hordacea (Kiener, 1843)
- Trivirostra houssayica Fehse, 2017
- Trivirostra hyalina Schilder, 1933
- Trivirostra insularum Schilder, 1944
- Trivirostra keehiensis Cate, 1979
- Trivirostra lacrima Fehse, 2015
- Trivirostra letourneuxi Fehse & Grego, 2008
- Trivirostra leylae Fehse & Grego, 2013
- Trivirostra mactanica Fehse & Grego, 2002
- Trivirostra matavai Fehse & Grego, 2013
- Trivirostra natalensis Schilder, 1932
- Trivirostra obliqua Fehse, 2017
- Trivirostra obscura (Gaskoin, 1849)
- Trivirostra oryza (Lamarck, 1811)
- Trivirostra oshimaensis Cate, 1979
- Trivirostra pellucidula (Gaskoin, 1846)
- Trivirostra poppei Fehse, 1999
- Trivirostra prosilia Fehse, 2015
- Trivirostra pseudotrivellona Fehse & Grego, 2008
- Trivirostra pyrena Fehse, 2017
- Trivirostra scabriuscula (Gray, 1827)
- Trivirostra shawi Schilder, 1933
- Trivirostra sphaeroides Schilder, 1933
- Trivirostra spioinsula Cate, 1979
- Trivirostra thaanumi Cate, 1979
- Trivirostra tomlini Schilder & M. Schilder, 1944
- Trivirostra triticum Schilder, 1932
- Trivirostra tryphaenae Fehse, 1998
- Trivirostra turneri Schilder, 1932
- Trivirostra vayssierei Cate, 1979
- Trivirostra vitrina Cate, 1979
- Trivirostra yangi Fehse & Grego, 2006

Species brought into synonymy

- Trivirostra aussiorum Cate, 1973: synonym of Austrotrivia aussiorum (Cate, 1979)
- Trivirostra bayeri Fehse, 1998: synonym of Purpurcapsula bayeri (Fehse, 1998)
- Trivirostra bipunctata (Odhner, 1917): synonym of Ellatrivia bipunctata (Odhner, 1917)
- Trivirostra corinneae (Shaw, 1909) : synonym of Purpurcapsula corinneae (Shaw, 1909)
- Trivirostra cydarum Cate, 1979: synonym of Ellatrivia cydarum (Cate, 1979)
- Trivirostra desirabilis (Iredale, 1912): synonym of Semitrivia desirabilis (Iredale, 1912)
- Trivirostra exigua (Gray, 1831): synonym of Purpurcapsula exigua (Gray, 1831)
- Trivirostra exmouthensis Cate, 1979: synonym of Ellatrivia exmouthensis (Cate, 1979)
- Trivirostra oryzoidea Iredale, 1935: synonym of Ellatrivia oryzoidea (Iredale, 1935)
- Trivirostra pargrando Iredale, 1935: synonym of Ellatrivia bipunctata (Odhner, 1917)
- Trivirostra polynesiae Cate, 1979: synonym of Purpurcapsula polynesiae (C. N. Cate, 1979)
- Trivirostra rubramaculosa Fehse & Grego, 2002: synonym of Purpurcapsula rubramaculosa (Fehse & Grego, 2002)
- Trivirostra zzyzyxia Cate, 1973: synonym of Purpurcapsula zzyzyxia (Cate, 1979)
