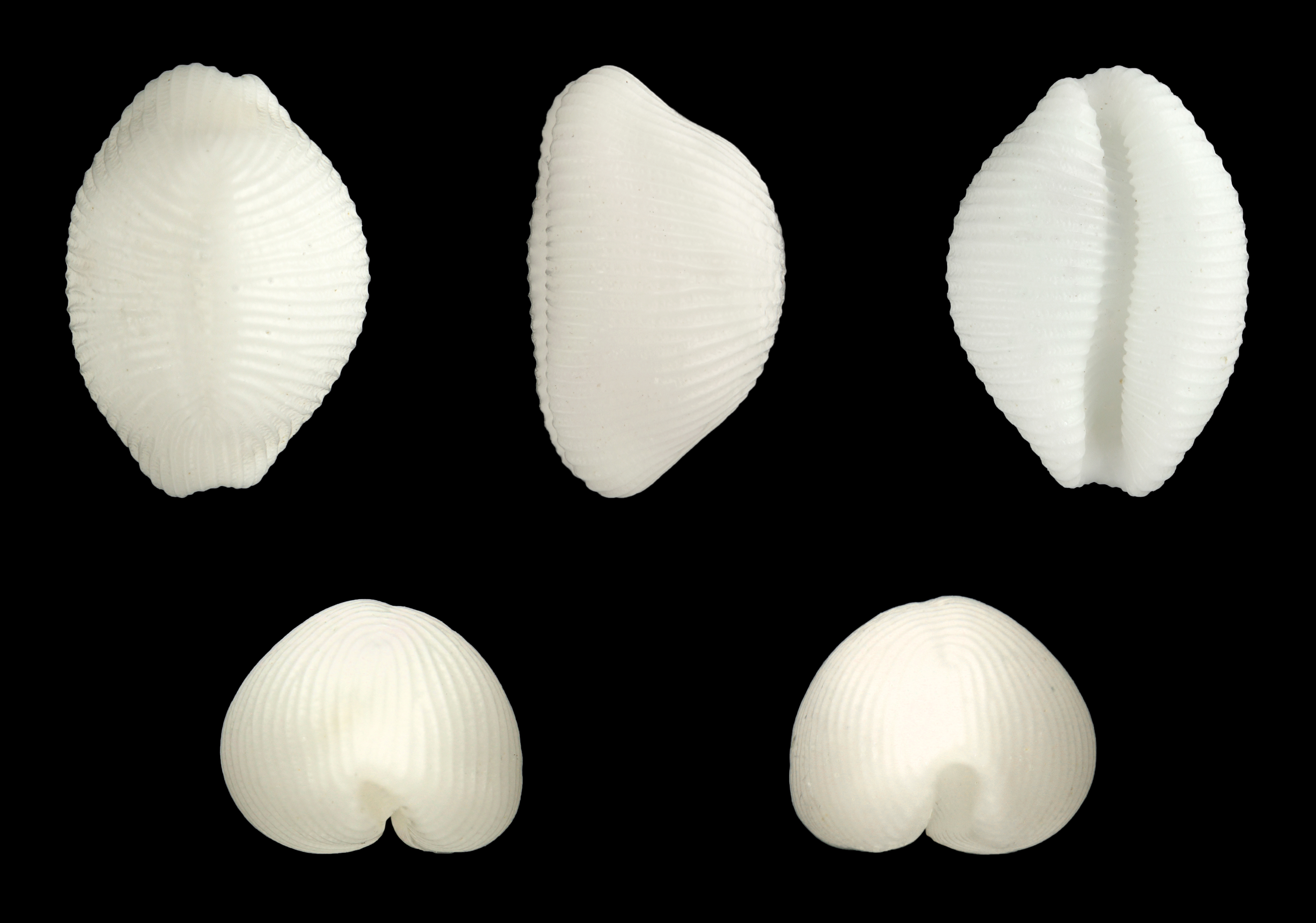

Scientific classification
- Kingdom: Animalia
- Phylum: Mollusca
- Class: Gastropoda
- Subclass: Caenogastropoda
- Order: Littorinimorpha
- Superfamily: Cypraeoidea
- Family: Triviidae
- Genus: Trivirostra
- Species: T. oryza

Binomial name
- Trivirostra oryza (Lamarck, 1810)

Synonyms
- Cypraea intermedia Kiener, 1844; Cypraea oryza Lamarck, 1810 (original combination); Trivia oryza (Lamarck, 1810)

= Trivirostra oryza =

Species of gastropod

Trivirostra oryza is a species of small sea snail, a marine gastropod mollusk in the family Triviidae, the false cowries or trivias.

== Distribution ==
This species occurs in the Indian Ocean, Indonesia, and many island groups in the western Pacific, including Fiji and the Marshall Islands where fossils were collected.
