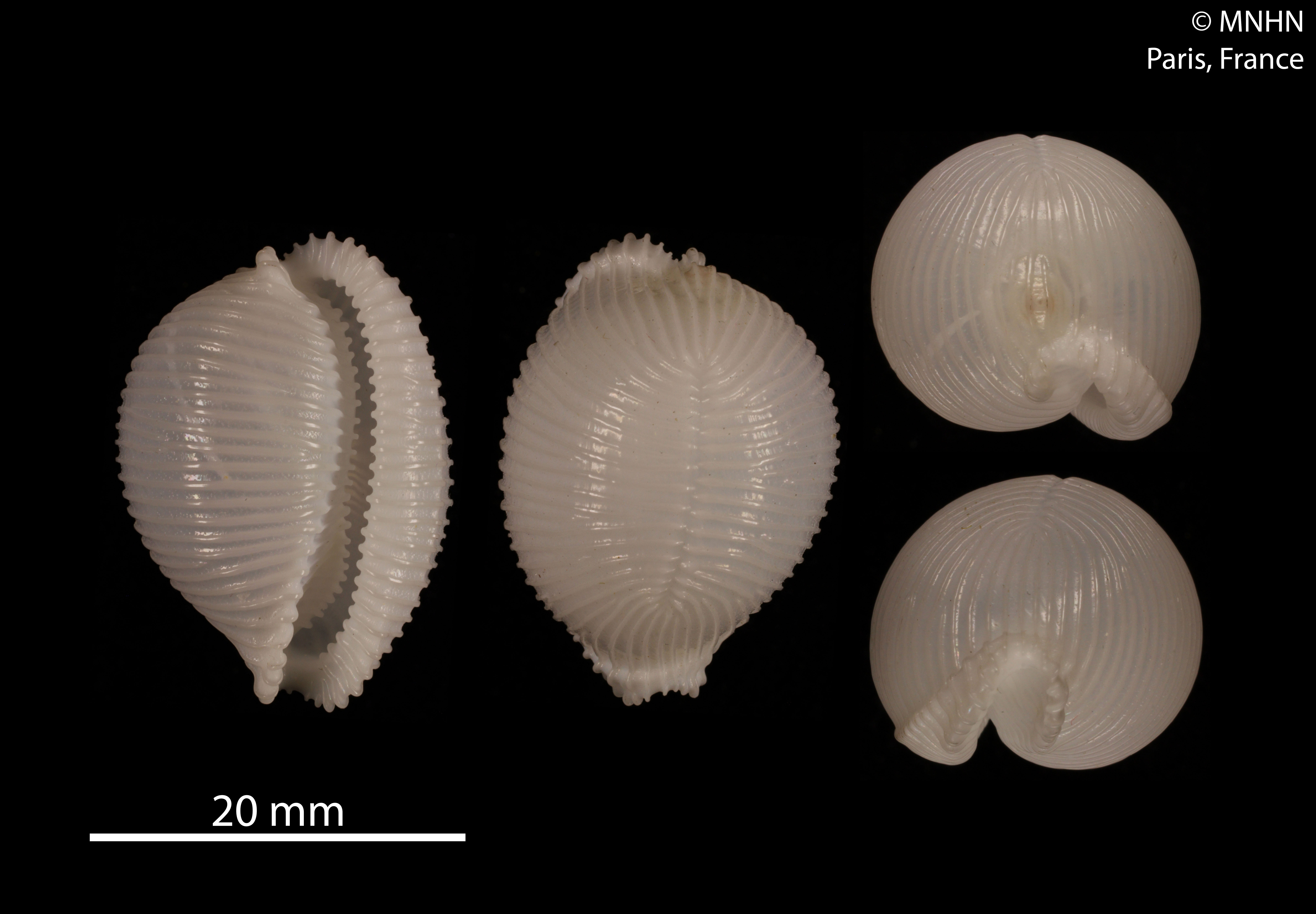
- Shell of Trivellona finleyi (specimen at MNHN? Paris)

Scientific classification
- Kingdom: Animalia
- Phylum: Mollusca
- Class: Gastropoda
- Subclass: Caenogastropoda
- Order: Littorinimorpha
- Family: Triviidae
- Genus: Trivellona
- Species: T. finleyi

Binomial name
- Trivellona finleyi (Beals, 2001)

Synonyms
- Robertotrivia finleyi Beals, 2001

= Trivellona finleyi =

Species of gastropod

Trivellona finleyi is a species of small sea snail, a marine gastropod mollusk in the family Triviidae, the false cowries or trivias.

== Description ==
The shell size varies between 12 mm and 23 mm.

== Distribution ==
This species is distributed in the Pacific Ocean along Hawaii and the Philippines
