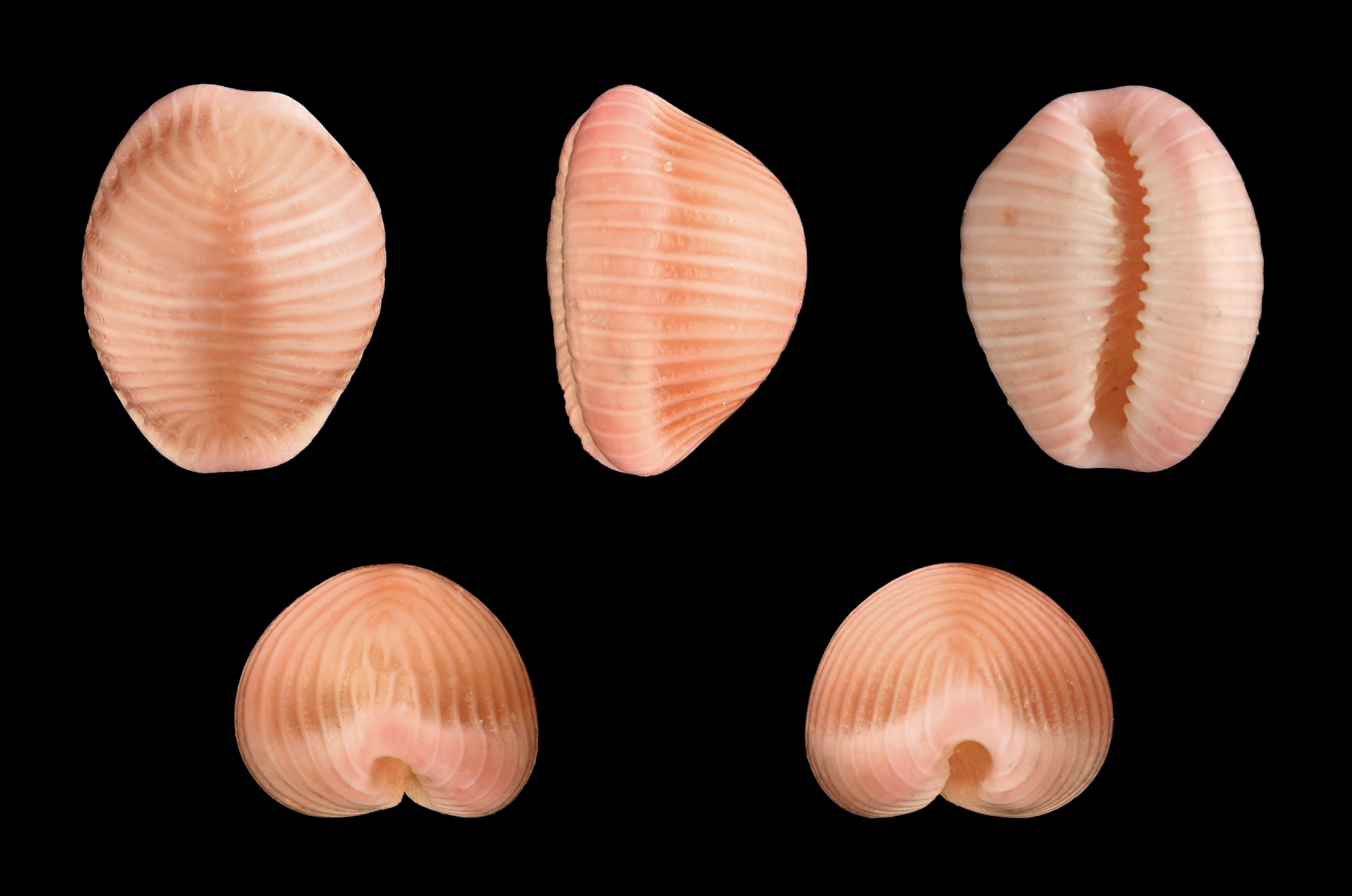

Scientific classification
- Kingdom: Animalia
- Phylum: Mollusca
- Class: Gastropoda
- Subclass: Caenogastropoda
- Order: Littorinimorpha
- Family: Triviidae
- Genus: Dolichupis
- Species: D. janae

Binomial name
- Dolichupis janae (Lorenz, 2001)

Synonyms
- Pusula janae Lorenz, 2001 (basionym)

= Dolichupis janae =

Species of gastropod

Dolichupis janae is a species of small sea snail, a marine gastropod mollusk in the family Triviidae, the false cowries or trivias.

== Distribution ==
This species occurs in the Indian Ocean off Sri Lanka
