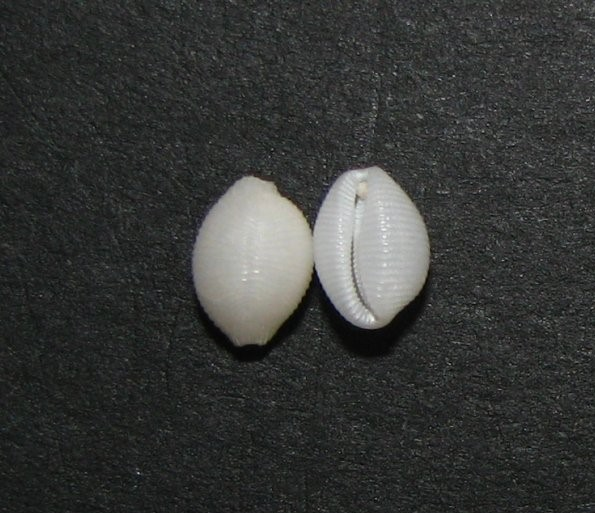
- Shell of Trivirostra hordacea

Scientific classification
- Kingdom: Animalia
- Phylum: Mollusca
- Class: Gastropoda
- Subclass: Caenogastropoda
- Order: Littorinimorpha
- Family: Triviidae
- Genus: Trivirostra
- Species: T. hordacea

Binomial name
- Trivirostra hordacea Kiener, 1843

Synonyms
- Cypraea hordacea Kiener, 1844 (original combination); Cypraea insecta Mighels, 1845 · unaccepted; Trivia hordacea (Kiener, 1844); Trivia insecta (Mighels, 1845) ·

= Trivirostra hordacea =

Species of gastropod

Trivirostra hordacea is a species of small sea snail, a marine gastropod mollusk in the family Triviidae, the false cowries or trivias.

== Description ==
The length of the shell attains 6 mm. They are white in colour and are characterised by their prominent ribs.

== Distribution ==
This marine species occurs off the Philippines, Hawaii, Fiji, Okinawa, Japan, Nerw South Wales (Australia), Zanzibar.
