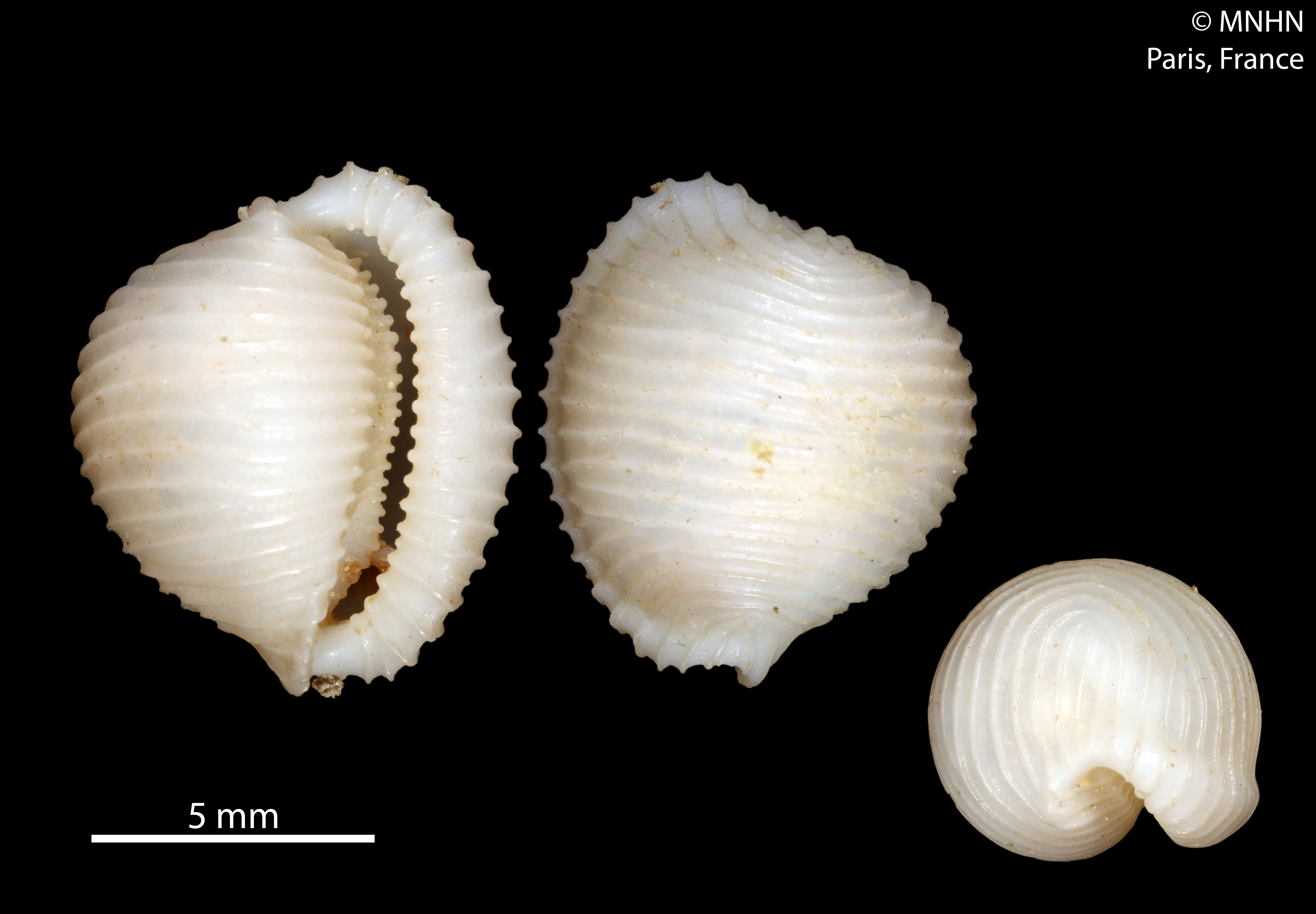
- Shell of Trivellona catei (paratype at MNHN, Paris)

Scientific classification
- Kingdom: Animalia
- Phylum: Mollusca
- Class: Gastropoda
- Subclass: Caenogastropoda
- Order: Littorinimorpha
- Family: Triviidae
- Genus: Trivellona
- Species: T. catei

Binomial name
- Trivellona catei Grego & Fehse, 2004

= Trivellona catei =

Species of gastropod

Trivellona catei is a species of small sea snail, a marine gastropod mollusk in the family Triviidae, the false cowries or trivias.

== Description ==
The length of the shell attains 11 mm.

== Distribution ==
This marine species occurs off the Philippines and New Caledonia.
