= Trivirostra tryphaenae =

Scientific classification
- Kingdom: Animalia
- Phylum: Mollusca
- Class: Gastropoda
- Subclass: Caenogastropoda
- Order: Littorinimorpha
- Family: Triviidae
- Genus: Trivirostra
- Species: T. tryphaenae

Binomial name
- Trivirostra tryphaenae Fehse, 1998

Species of gastropod

Trivirostra tryphaenae is a species of small sea snail, a marine gastropod mollusk in the family Triviidae, the false cowries or trivias.
