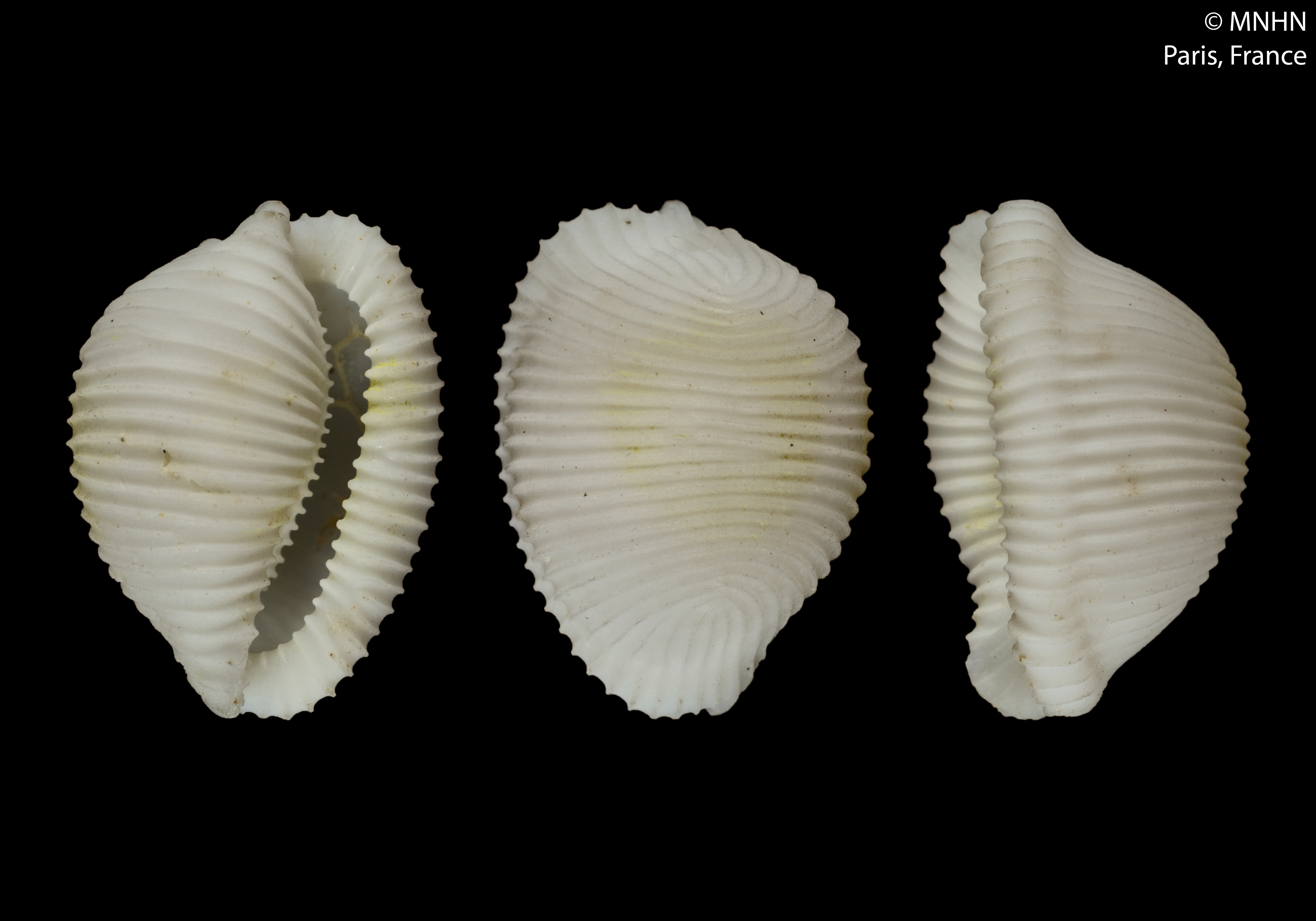
- Shell of Trivellona galea (holotype at MNHN, Paris)

Scientific classification
- Kingdom: Animalia
- Phylum: Mollusca
- Class: Gastropoda
- Subclass: Caenogastropoda
- Order: Littorinimorpha
- Family: Triviidae
- Genus: Trivellona
- Species: T. galea

Binomial name
- Trivellona galea Dolin, 2001

= Trivellona galea =

Species of gastropod

Trivellona galea is a species of small sea snail, a marine gastropod mollusk in the family Triviidae, the false cowries or trivias.

== Distribution ==
This marine species occurs off New Caledonia.
