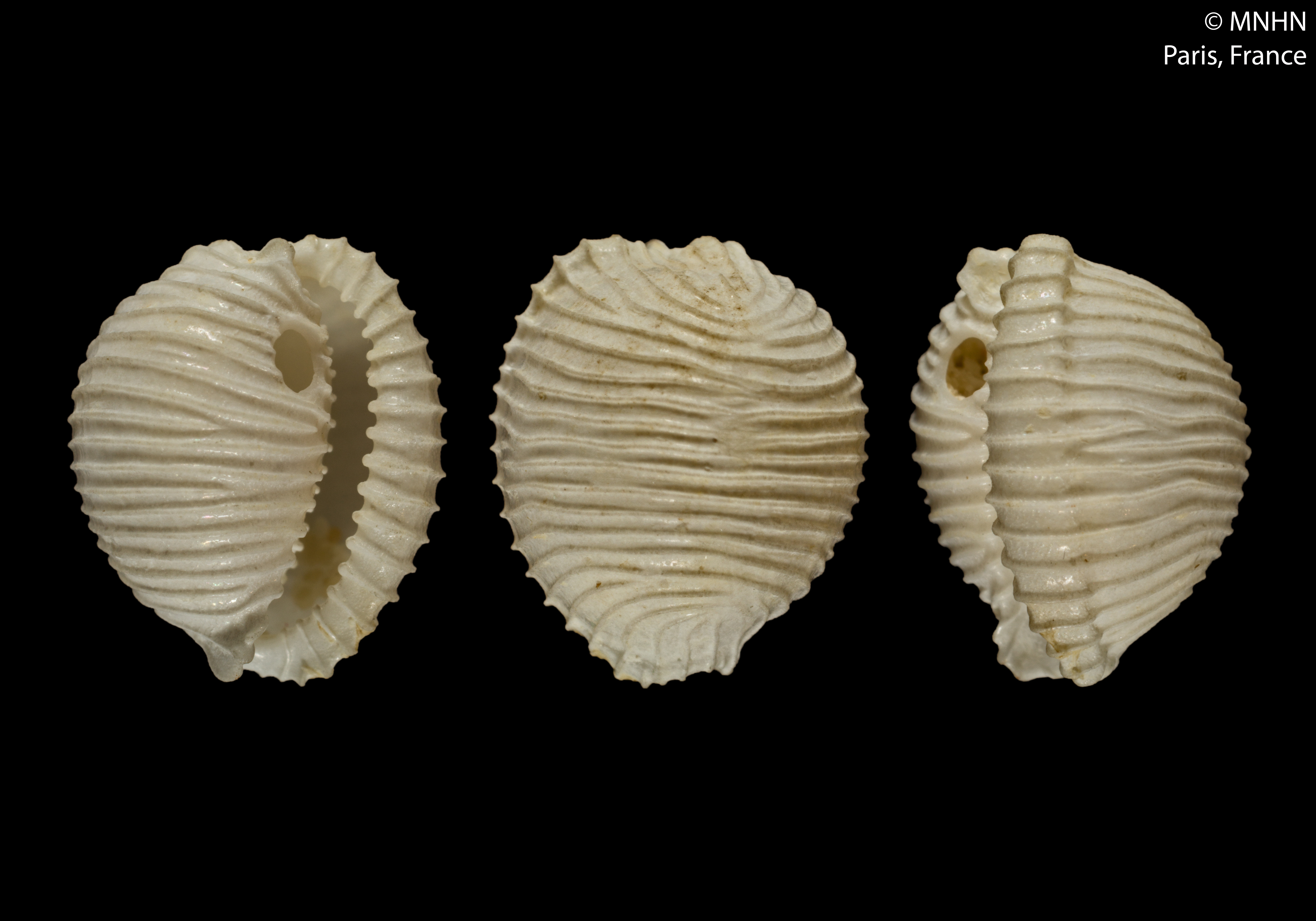
- Shell of Trivellona bulla (holotype at MNHN, Paris)

Scientific classification
- Kingdom: Animalia
- Phylum: Mollusca
- Class: Gastropoda
- Subclass: Caenogastropoda
- Order: Littorinimorpha
- Family: Triviidae
- Genus: Trivellona
- Species: T. bulla

Binomial name
- Trivellona bulla Dolin, 2001

= Trivellona bulla =

Species of gastropod

Trivellona bulla is a species of small sea snail, a marine gastropod mollusk in the family Triviidae, the false cowries or trivias.

== Description ==
The length of the shell attains 0.8 mm.

== Distribution ==
This species occurs in the Coral Sea off New Caledonia.
