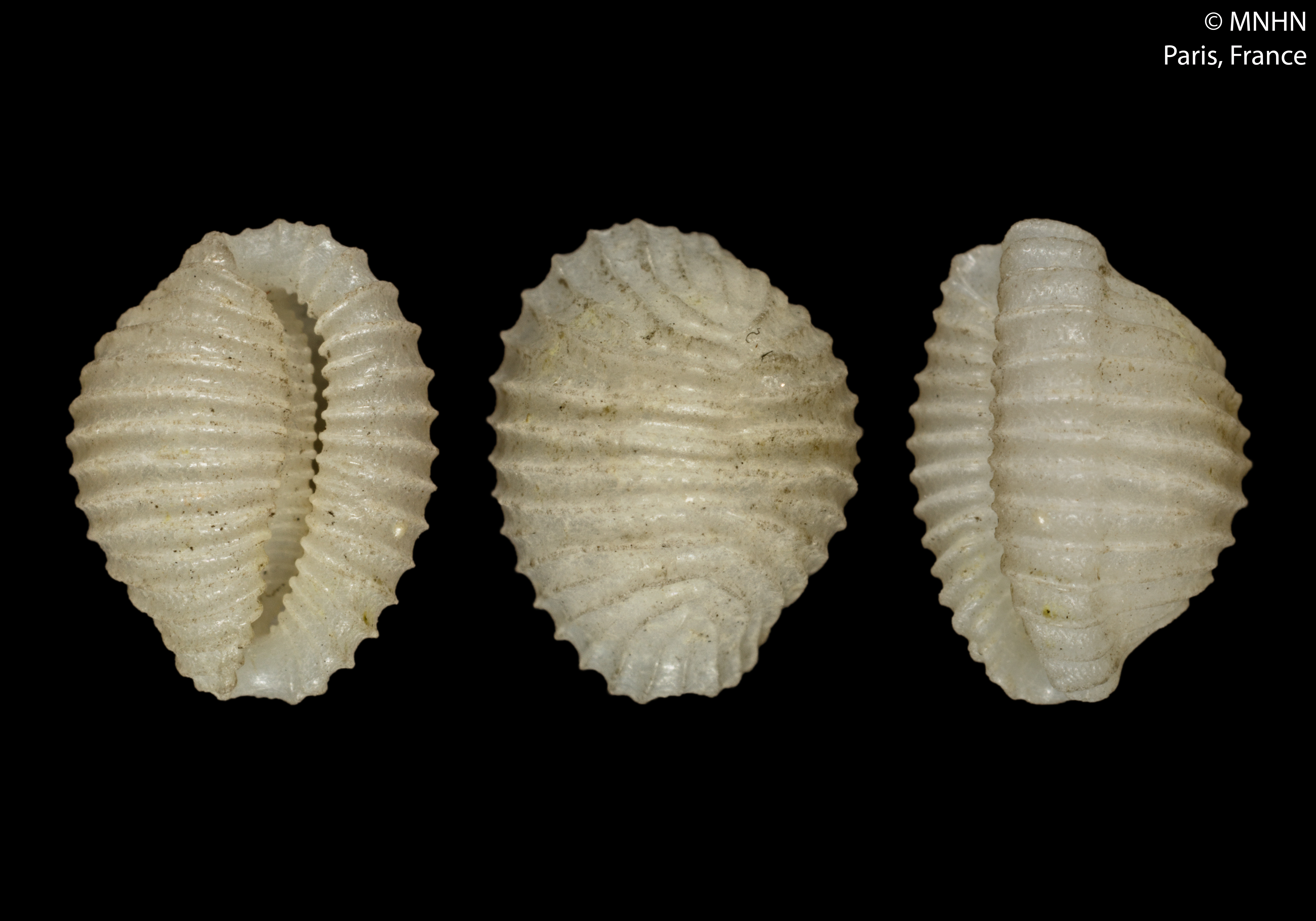
- Shell of Gregoia vitrosphaera (holotype at MNHN, Paris)

Scientific classification
- Kingdom: Animalia
- Phylum: Mollusca
- Class: Gastropoda
- Subclass: Caenogastropoda
- Order: Littorinimorpha
- Family: Triviidae
- Genus: Gregoia
- Species: G. vitrosphaera

Binomial name
- Gregoia vitrosphaera (Dolin, 2001)

= Gregoia vitrosphaera =

Species of gastropod

Gregoia vitrosphaera is a species of small sea snail, a marine gastropod mollusk in the family Triviidae, the false cowries or trivias.

== Description ==
The length of the shell attains 6.7 mm.

== Distribution ==
This marine species occurs in the Coral Sea.
