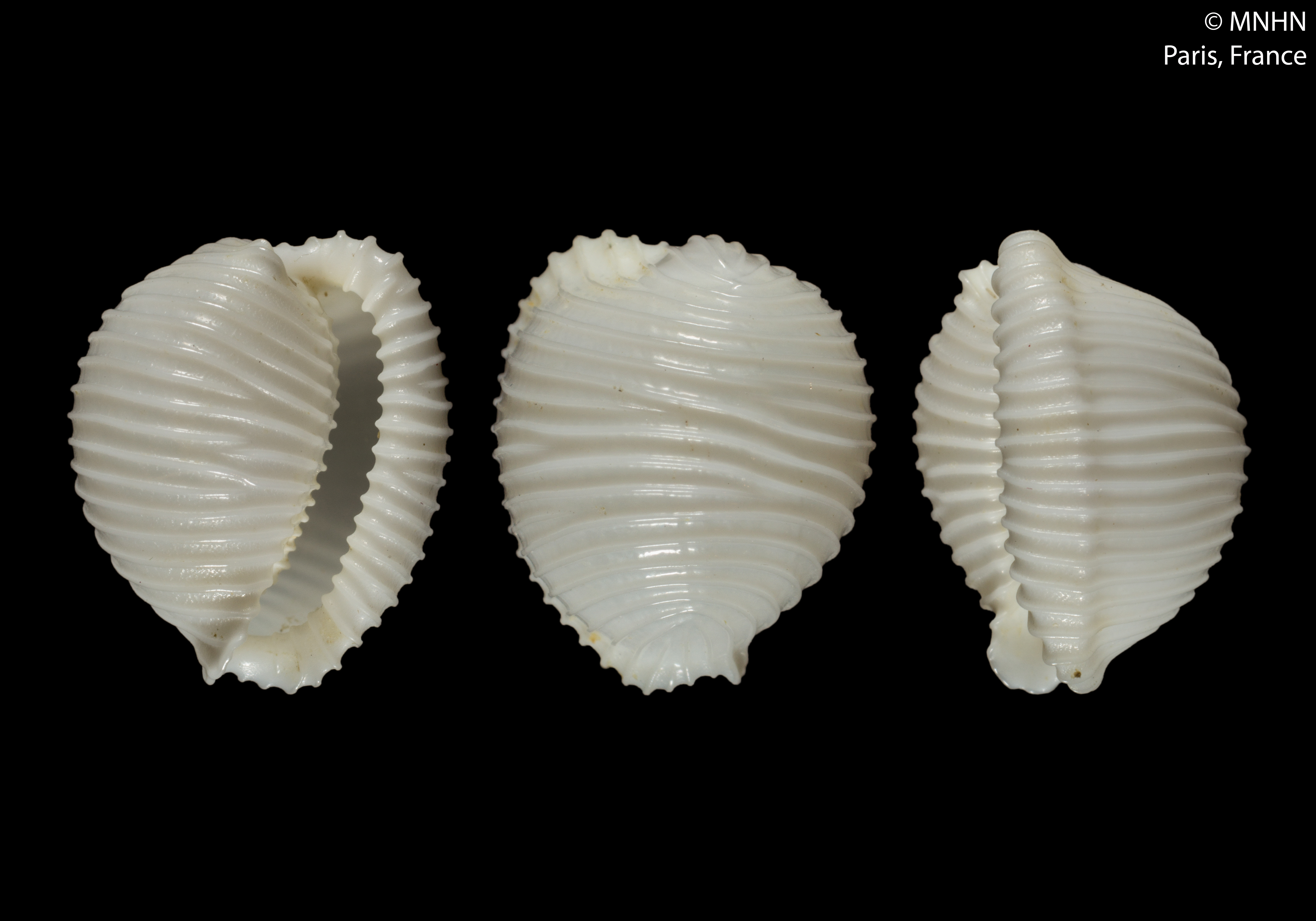
- Shell of Trivellona eglantina (holotype at MNHN, Paris)

Scientific classification
- Kingdom: Animalia
- Phylum: Mollusca
- Class: Gastropoda
- Subclass: Caenogastropoda
- Order: Littorinimorpha
- Family: Triviidae
- Genus: Trivellona
- Species: T. eglantina

Binomial name
- Trivellona eglantina Dolin, 2001

= Trivellona eglantina =

Species of gastropod

Trivellona eglantina is a species of small sea snail, a marine gastropod mollusk in the family Triviidae, the false cowries or trivias.

== Description ==
The length of the shell attains 9.1 mm.

== Distribution ==
This marine species occurs off the Philippines.
