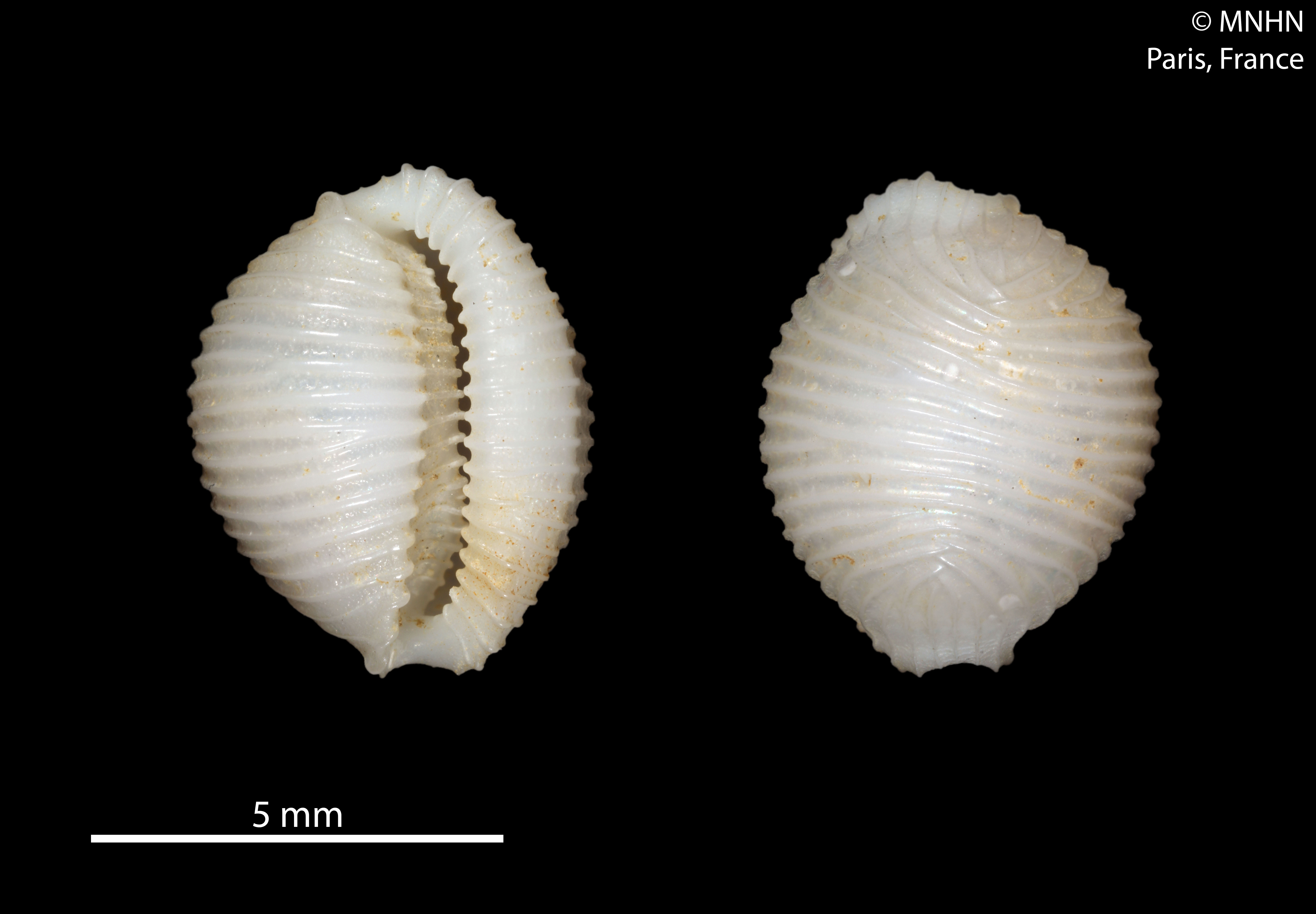
- Shell of Trivellona dolini (paratype at MNHN, Paris)

Scientific classification
- Kingdom: Animalia
- Phylum: Mollusca
- Class: Gastropoda
- Subclass: Caenogastropoda
- Order: Littorinimorpha
- Family: Triviidae
- Genus: Trivellona
- Species: T. dolini

Binomial name
- Trivellona dolini Grego & Fehse, 2004

= Trivellona dolini =

Species of gastropod

Trivellona dolini is a species of small sea snail, a marine gastropod mollusk in the family Triviidae, the false cowries or trivias.

== Description ==
The length of the shell attains 6 mm.

== Distribution ==
This species occurs off the Philippines, New Caledonia and in the East China Sea.
