= Dolichupis malvabasis =

Scientific classification
- Kingdom: Animalia
- Phylum: Mollusca
- Class: Gastropoda
- Subclass: Caenogastropoda
- Order: Littorinimorpha
- Family: Triviidae
- Genus: Dolichupis
- Species: D. malvabasis

Binomial name
- Dolichupis malvabasis Dolin, 2001

Species of gastropod

Dolichupis malvabasis is a species of small sea snail, a marine gastropod mollusk in the family Triviidae, the false cowries or trivias.
