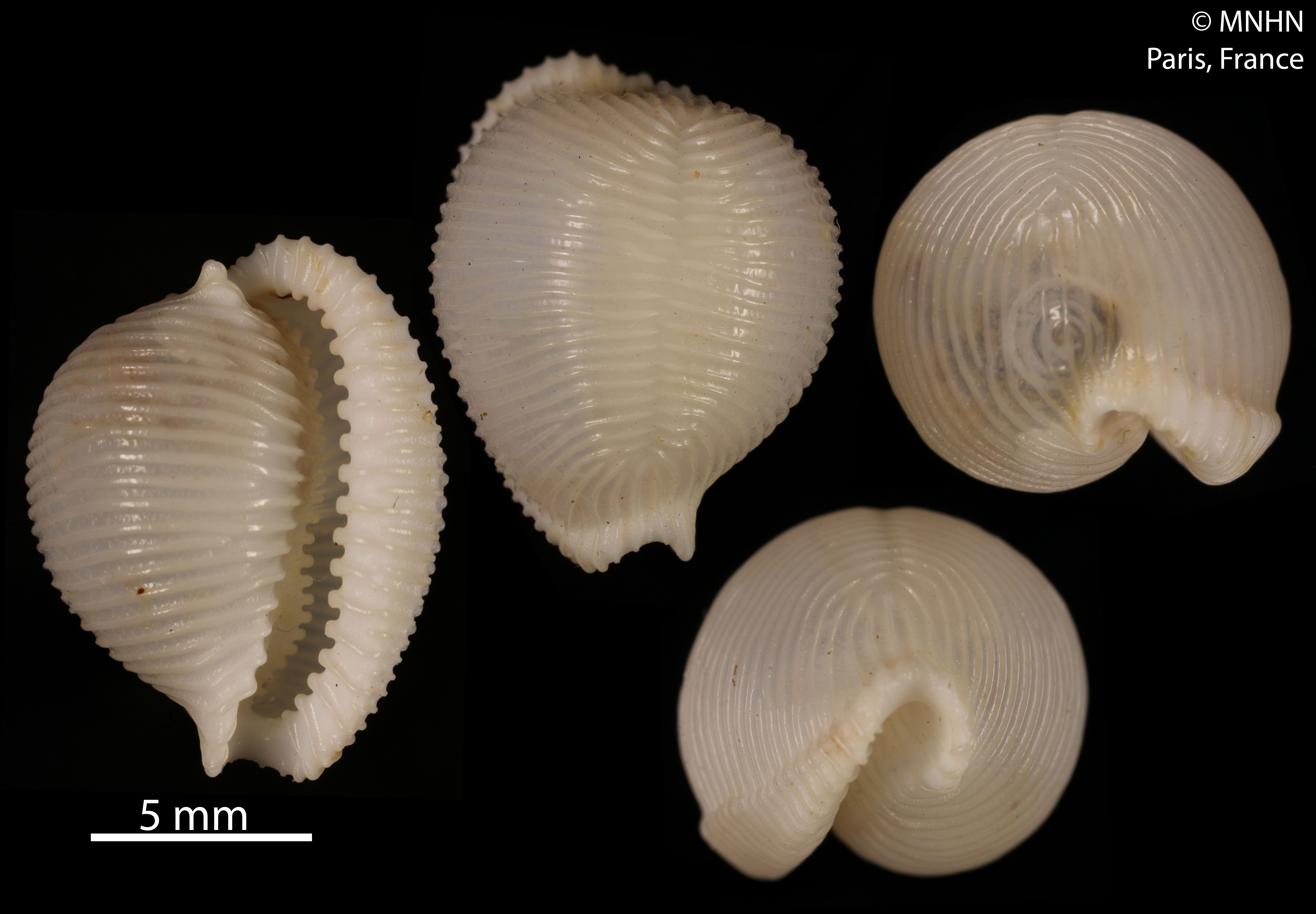
- Shell of Trivellona bealsi (specimern at MNHN, Paris)

Scientific classification
- Kingdom: Animalia
- Phylum: Mollusca
- Class: Gastropoda
- Subclass: Caenogastropoda
- Order: Littorinimorpha
- Family: Triviidae
- Genus: Trivellona
- Species: T. bealsi

Binomial name
- Trivellona bealsi Rosenberg & Finley, 2001

= Trivellona bealsi =

Species of gastropod

Trivellona bealsi is a species of small sea snail, a marine gastropod mollusk in the family Triviidae, the false cowries or trivias.

== Description ==
The length of the shell attains 9 mm.

== Distribution ==
This marine specimen occurs off the Philippines.
