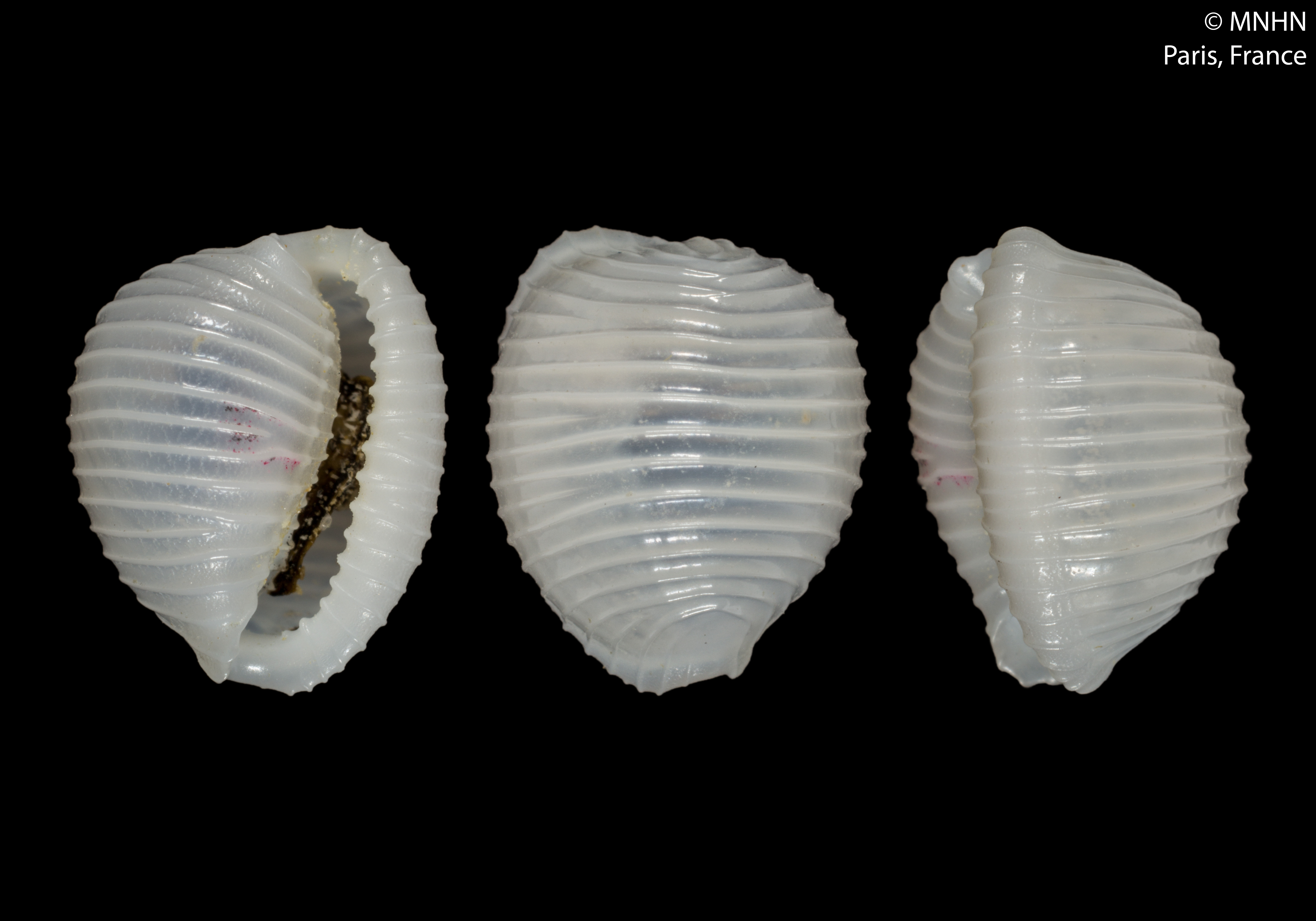
- Shell of Trivellona paucicostata (holotype at MNHN, Paris)

Scientific classification
- Kingdom: Animalia
- Phylum: Mollusca
- Class: Gastropoda
- Subclass: Caenogastropoda
- Order: Littorinimorpha
- Family: Triviidae
- Genus: Trivellona
- Species: T. paucicostata

Binomial name
- Trivellona paucicostata (Schepman, 1909)

Synonyms
- Trivellona oligopleura Dolin, 2001; Trivia paucicostata Schepman, 1909

= Trivellona paucicostata =

Species of gastropod

Trivellona paucicostata is a species of small sea snail, a marine gastropod mollusk in the family Triviidae, the false cowries or trivias.

== Subspecies ==
- Trivellona paucicostata valerieae (Hart, 1996): synonym of Trivellona valerieae (Hart, 1996)

== Description ==
The length of the shell attains 8.7 mm.

== Distribution ==
This marine species occurs off New Caledonia and the Philippines.
