= Dolichupis virgo =

Scientific classification
- Kingdom: Animalia
- Phylum: Mollusca
- Class: Gastropoda
- Subclass: Caenogastropoda
- Order: Littorinimorpha
- Family: Triviidae
- Genus: Dolichupis
- Species: D. virgo

Binomial name
- Dolichupis virgo Fehse & Grego, 2005

Species of gastropod

Dolichupis virgo is a species of small sea snail, a marine gastropod mollusk in the family Triviidae, the false cowries or trivias.

== Description ==
The maximum recorded shell length is 7.3 mm.

== Habitat ==
Minimum recorded depth is 33 m. Maximum recorded depth is 33 m.
