= Trivellona globulus =

Scientific classification
- Kingdom: Animalia
- Phylum: Mollusca
- Class: Gastropoda
- Subclass: Caenogastropoda
- Order: Littorinimorpha
- Family: Triviidae
- Genus: Trivellona
- Species: T. globulus

Binomial name
- Trivellona globulus Grego & Fehse, 2004

Species of gastropod

Trivellona globulus is a species of small sea snail, a marine gastropod mollusk in the family Triviidae, the false cowries or trivias.
