= Trivirostra corrugata =

Scientific classification
- Kingdom: Animalia
- Phylum: Mollusca
- Class: Gastropoda
- Subclass: Caenogastropoda
- Order: Littorinimorpha
- Family: Triviidae
- Genus: Trivirostra
- Species: T. corrugata

Binomial name
- Trivirostra corrugata Pease, 1868

Species of gastropod

Trivirostra corrugata is a species of small sea snail, a marine gastropod mollusk in the family Triviidae, the false cowries or trivias.
