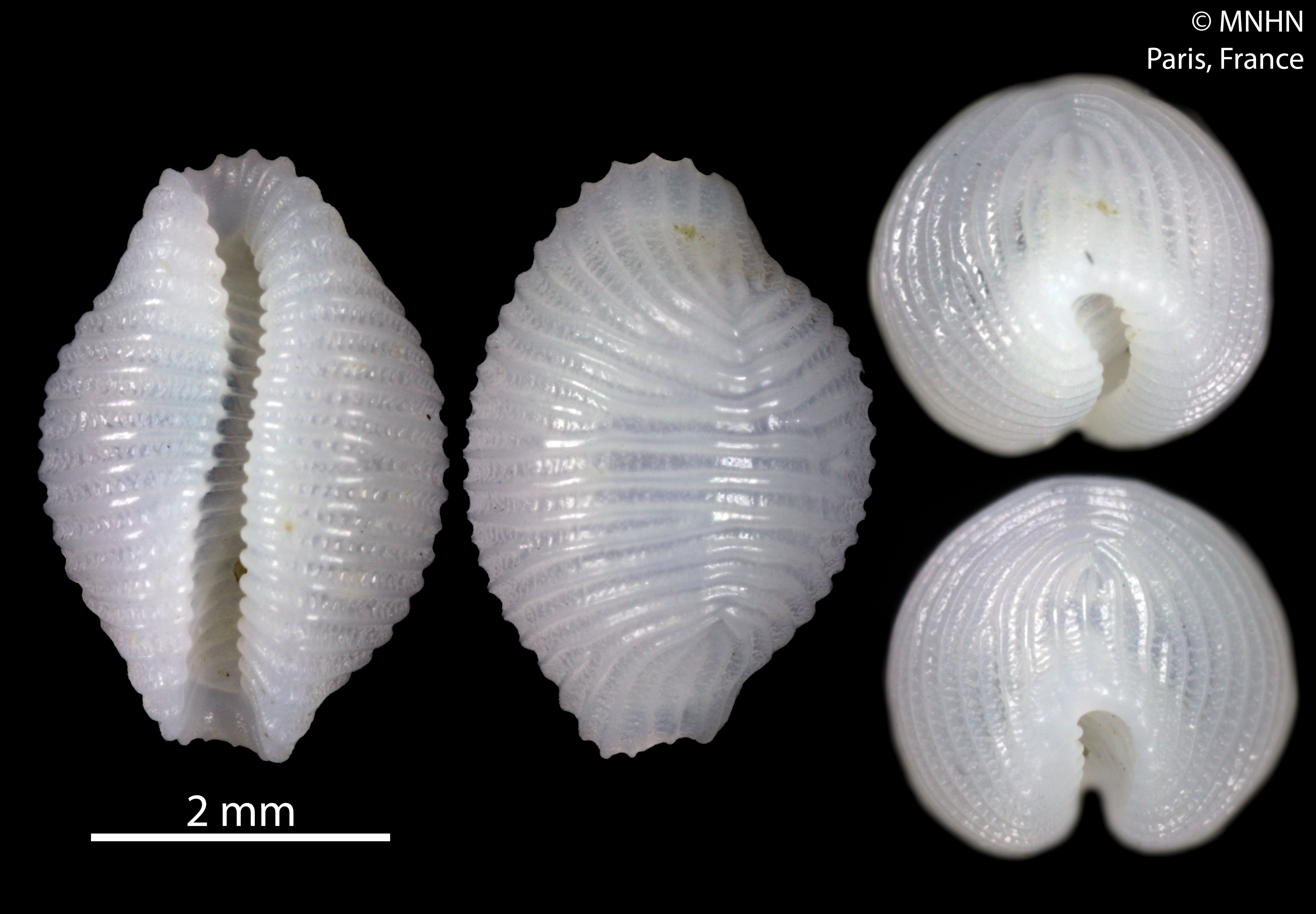
- Shell of Trivirostra hyalina (specimen at MNHN, Paris)

Scientific classification
- Kingdom: Animalia
- Phylum: Mollusca
- Class: Gastropoda
- Subclass: Caenogastropoda
- Order: Littorinimorpha
- Family: Triviidae
- Genus: Trivirostra
- Species: T. hyalina

Binomial name
- Trivirostra hyalina Schilder, 1933

Synonyms
- Trivirostra corrugata hyalina F. A. Schilder, 1933; Trivirostra exigua hyalina F. A. Schilder, 1933 (original combination)

= Trivirostra hyalina =

Species of gastropod

Trivirostra hyalina is a species of small sea snail, a marine gastropod mollusk in the family Triviidae, the false cowries or trivias. They are white.

== Description ==
The length of the shell attains 4 mm. Individuals can grow up to 5.5 mm in length.

== Distribution ==
This marine species occurs off Oceania. In Australia, they were found in New South Wales and Western Australia.
