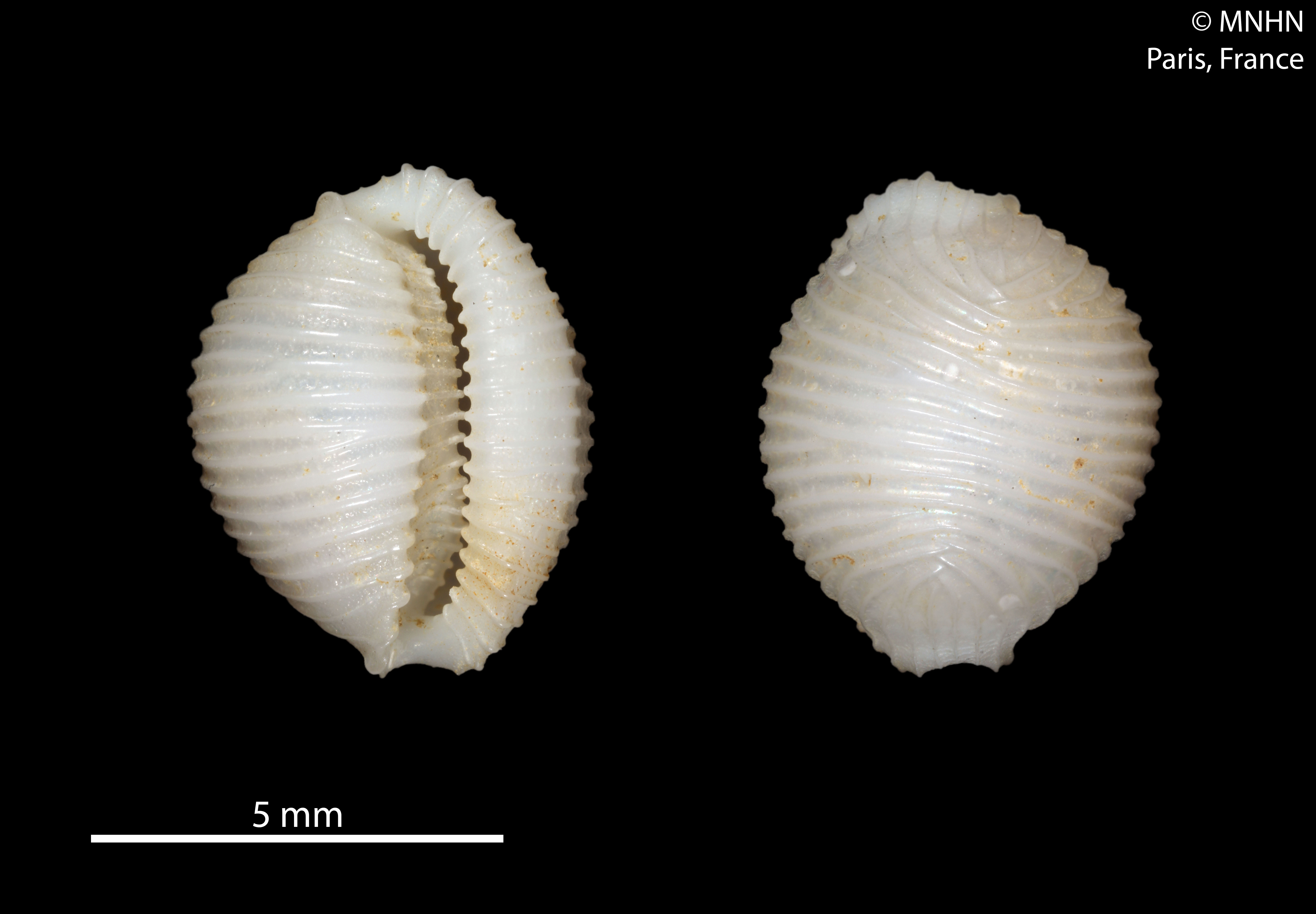
- Trivellona dolini

Scientific classification
- Kingdom: Animalia
- Phylum: Mollusca
- Class: Gastropoda
- Subclass: Caenogastropoda
- Order: Littorinimorpha
- Superfamily: Cypraeoidea
- Family: Triviidae
- Genus: Trivellona; Iredale, 1931

Type species
- Trivellona excelsa Iredale, 1931

Synonyms
- Nototrivia Schilder, 1939 †; Pseudotrivia Schilder, 1936; Robertotrivia Cate, 1979; Trivia (Pseudotrivia) Schilder, 1936

= Trivellona =

Genus of gastropods

Trivellona is a genus of small sea snails, marine gastropod mollusks in the family Triviidae, the false cowries or trivias.

== Species ==
Species within the genus Trivellona include:

- Trivellona abyssicola (Schepman, 1909)
- Trivellona aequabilis Fehse, 2017
- Trivellona aliquando Fehse, 2015
- Trivellona bealsi Rosenberg & Finley, 2001
- Trivellona bulla Dolin, 2001
- Trivellona caelatura (Hedley, 1918)
- Trivellona carina Fehse, 2017
- Trivellona catei Grego & Fehse, 2004
- Trivellona conjonctiva Dolin, 2001
- † Trivellona darraghi Fehse & Grego, 2008
- Trivellona desirabilis (Iredale, 1912)
- Trivellona dolini Grego & Fehse, 2004
- Trivellona eglantina Dolin, 2001
- Trivellona ellenae Fehse, 2017
- Trivellona enricoschwabei Fehse & Grego, 2012
- Trivellona eos (Roberts, 1913)
- Trivellona excelsa Iredale, 1931
- Trivellona finleyi (Beals, 2001)
- Trivellona galea Dolin, 2001
- Trivellona gilbertoi Fehse, 2015
- Trivellona globulus Grego & Fehse, 2004
- Trivellona hansposti Fehse, 2017
- Trivellona haplomorpha Fehse, 2017
- Trivellona homala Fehse, 2017
- Trivellona inflata Fehse, 2017
- Trivellona inopinata Fehse, 2020
- † Trivellona kendricki Fehse & Grego, 2008
- Trivellona kiiensis (Kuroda & Cate in Cate, 1979)
- Trivellona lactea Fehse, 2017
- Trivellona laurenti Fehse, 2017
- Trivellona litolabra Fehse, 2017
- † Trivellona lochi Fehse & Grego, 2008
- † Trivellona makranica Harzhauser, 2017
- Trivellona marlowi (Rosenberg & Finley, 2001)
- Trivellona opalina (Kuroda & Cate in Cate, 1979)
- Trivellona ovata Fehse, 2017
- Trivellona panglaoica Fehse, 2017
- Trivellona paucicostata (Schepman, 1909)
- Trivellona plana Fehse, 2017
- Trivellona puillandrei Fehse, 2017
- Trivellona pulchra Fehse & Grego, 2012
- Trivellona pyrifera Fehse, 2017
- Trivellona rugosa Fehse, 2017
- Trivellona sagamiensis (Kuroda & Habe in Kuroda, Habe & Oyama, 1971)
- Trivellona samadiae Fehse, 2015
- Trivellona samarensis (C. N. Cate, 1979)
- Trivellona schepmani (Schilder, 1941)
- Trivellona shimajiriensis (MacNeil, 1961)
- Trivellona sibogae (Schepman, 1909)
- Trivellona speciosa (Kuroda & Cate in Cate, 1979)
- Trivellona suavis (Schilder, 1931)
- Trivellona suduirauti (Lorenz, 1996)
- Trivellona syzygia Dolin, 2001
- Trivellona valerieae (Hart, 1996)

Synonyms

- Trivellona costata (Gmelin, 1791): synonym of Triviella costata (Gmelin, 1791)
- Trivellona dumaliensis (C. N. Cate, 1979): synonym of Niveria nix (Schilder, 1922)
- Trivellona eratoides (Liltved, 1986): synonym of Triviella eratoides (Liltved, 1986)
- Trivellona multicostata (Liltved, 1986): synonym of Triviella multicostata (Liltved, 1986)
- Trivellona oligopleura Dolin, 2001: synonym of Trivellona paucicostata (Schepman, 1909)
- Trivellona sharonae (Hayes, 1993): synonym of Triviella sharonae (Hayes, 1993)
- Trivellona vesicularis (Gaskoin, 1836): synonym of Triviella vesicularis (Gaskoin, 1836)
