= Dolichupis leucosphaera =

Scientific classification
- Kingdom: Animalia
- Phylum: Mollusca
- Class: Gastropoda
- Subclass: Caenogastropoda
- Order: Littorinimorpha
- Family: Triviidae
- Genus: Dolichupis
- Species: D. leucosphaera

Binomial name
- Dolichupis leucosphaera (Schilder, 1931)

Synonyms
- Cleotrivia leucosphaera (Schilder, 1931); Pusula leucosphaera Schilder, 1931 (basionym); Trivia leucosphaera (Schilder, 1931)

Species of gastropod

Dolichupis leucosphaera is a species of small sea snail, a marine gastropod mollusk in the family Triviidae, the false cowries or trivias.
