= Semitrivia tsuchidai =

Scientific classification
- Kingdom: Animalia
- Phylum: Mollusca
- Class: Gastropoda
- Subclass: Caenogastropoda
- Order: Littorinimorpha
- Family: Triviidae
- Genus: Semitrivia
- Species: S. tsuchidai

Binomial name
- Semitrivia tsuchidai Fehse, 2002

Species of gastropod

Semitrivia tsuchidai is a species of small sea snail, a marine gastropod mollusc in the family Triviidae, the false cowries or trivias.
