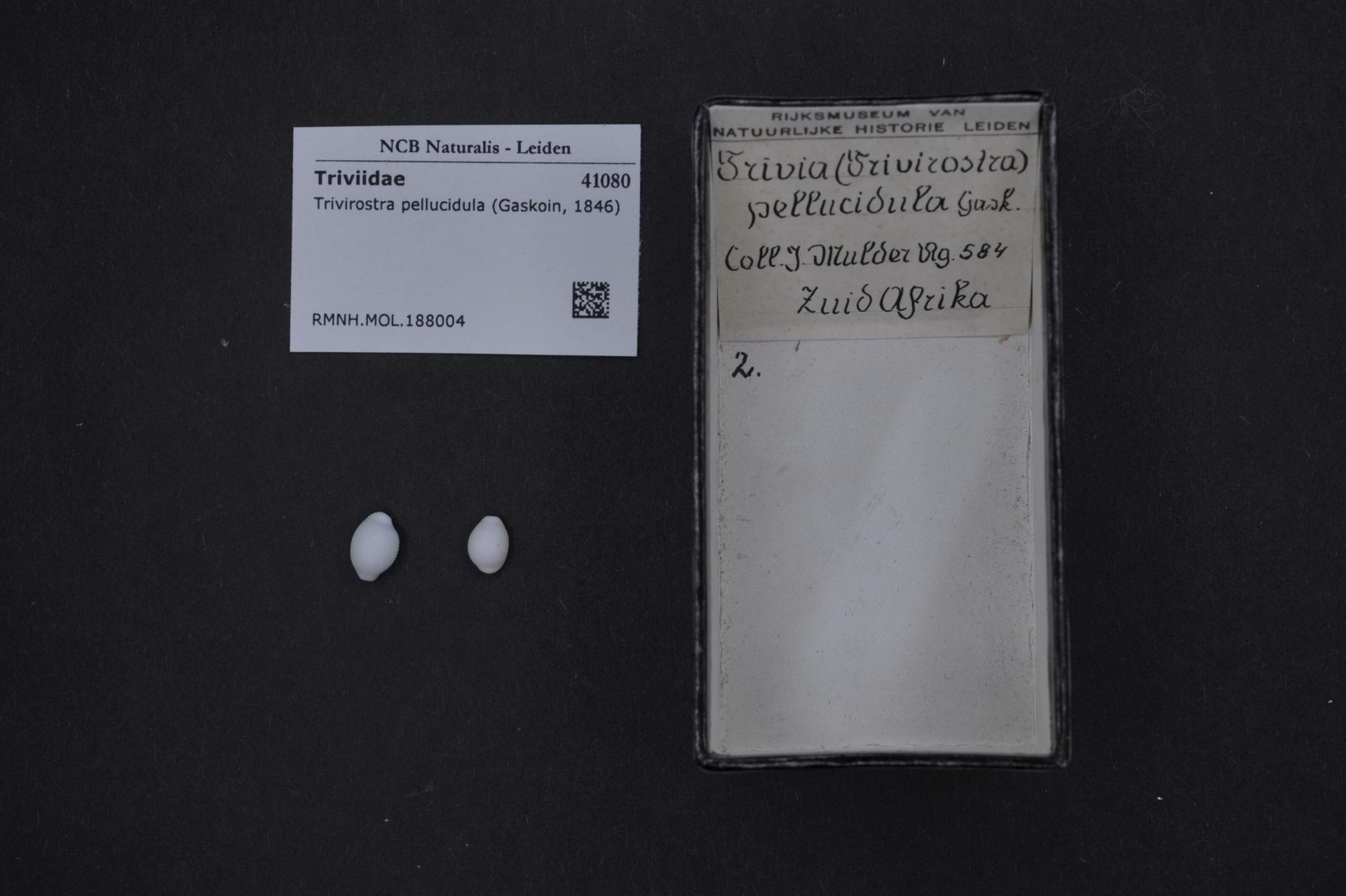

Scientific classification
- Kingdom: Animalia
- Phylum: Mollusca
- Class: Gastropoda
- Subclass: Caenogastropoda
- Order: Littorinimorpha
- Family: Triviidae
- Genus: Trivirostra
- Species: T. pellucidula

Binomial name
- Trivirostra pellucidula (Gaskoin, 1846)

Synonyms
- Trivia pellucidula (Gaskoin, 1846)

= Trivirostra pellucidula =

Species of gastropod

Trivirostra pellucidula, common name the riceys, is a species of small sea snail, a marine gastropod mollusc in the family Triviidae, the false cowries or trivias.
