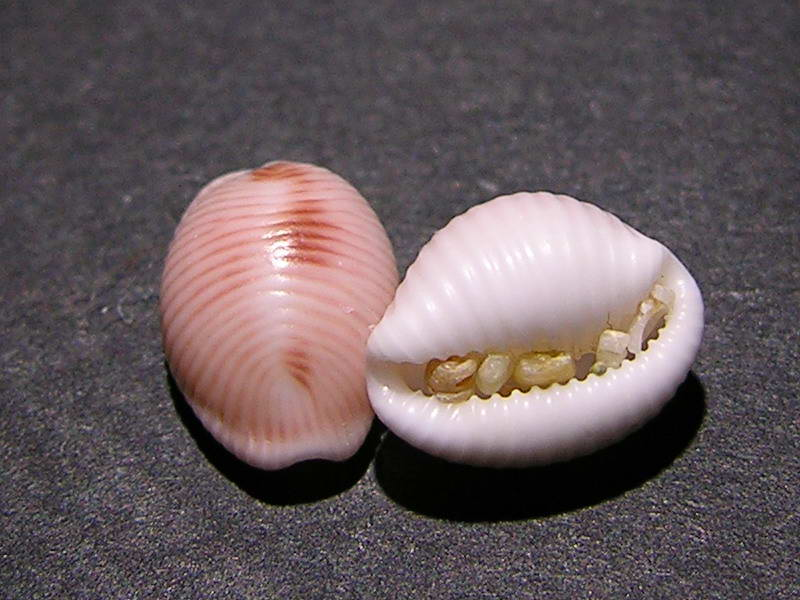
- Beachworn shells of Ellatrivia merces, with sand grains trapped in the aperture

Scientific classification
- Kingdom: Animalia
- Phylum: Mollusca
- Class: Gastropoda
- Subclass: Caenogastropoda
- Order: Littorinimorpha
- Family: Triviidae
- Genus: Ellatrivia
- Species: E. merces

Binomial name
- Ellatrivia merces (Iredale, 1924)

Synonyms
- Cypraea australis Lamarck, 1822; Ellatrivia memorata (Finlay, 1927); Ellatrivia merces addenda Iredale, 1931 (Unavailable name - nomen nudum); Trivia merces (Iredale, 1924); Triviella maoriensis Mestayer, 1927; Triviella memorata Finlay, 1927; Triviella merces Iredale, 1924; Trivellona excelsa Iredale, 1931

= Ellatrivia merces =

Species of gastropod

Ellatrivia merces is a species of small sea snail, a marine gastropod mollusc in the family Triviidae, the trivias.

== Distribution ==
This marine species is endemic to Australia and occurs in the Tasman Sea.
