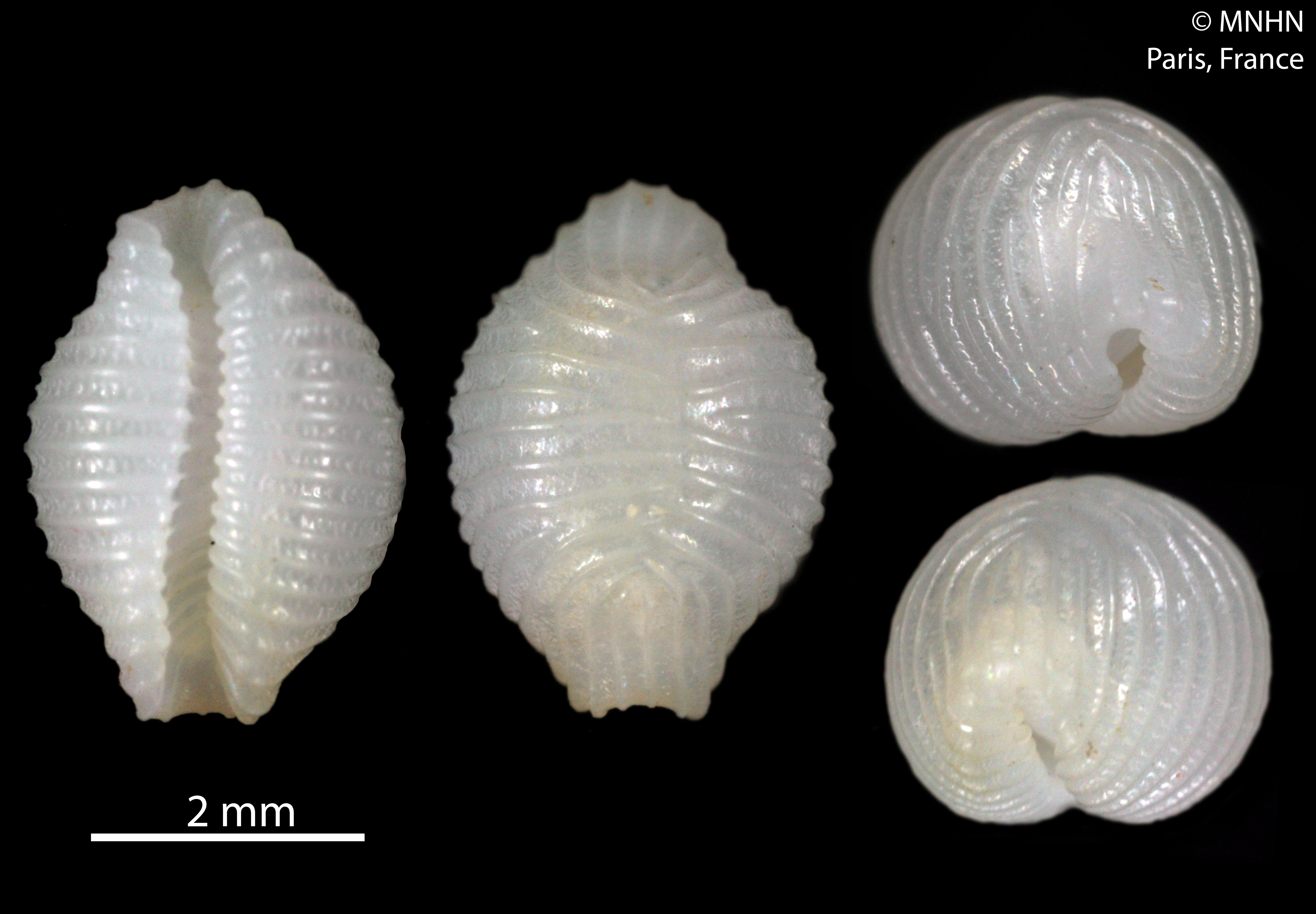
- Shell of Purpurcapsula bayeri (specimen at MNHN, Paris)

Scientific classification
- Kingdom: Animalia
- Phylum: Mollusca
- Class: Gastropoda
- Subclass: Caenogastropoda
- Order: Littorinimorpha
- Family: Triviidae
- Genus: Purpurcapsula
- Species: P. bayeri

Binomial name
- Purpurcapsula bayeri (Fehse, 1998)

Synonyms
- Austrotrivia bayeri (Fehse, 1999); Trivirostra bayeri Fehse, 1998 (basionym)

= Purpurcapsula bayeri =

Species of gastropod

Purpurcapsula bayeri is a species of small sea snail, a marine gastropod mollusk in the family Triviidae, the false cowries or trivias.

== Distribution ==
This marine species occurs off the Marquesas Islands.
