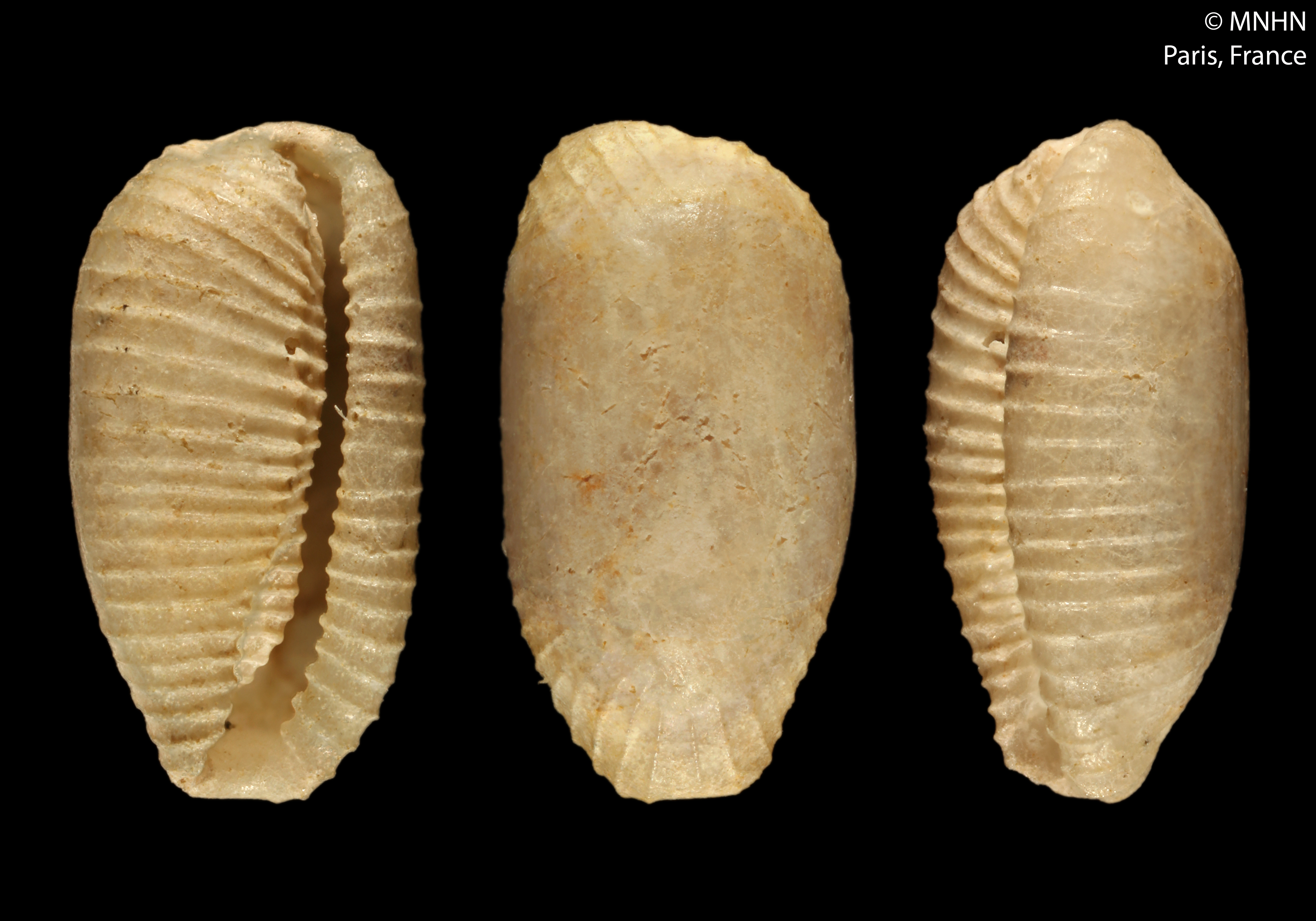
- Shell of Semitrivia calvitia (holotype at MNHN, Paris)

Scientific classification
- Kingdom: Animalia
- Phylum: Mollusca
- Class: Gastropoda
- Subclass: Caenogastropoda
- Order: Littorinimorpha
- Superfamily: Cypraeoidea
- Family: Triviidae
- Genus: Semitrivia; Cossman, 1903

Type species
- †Trivia erugata Tate, 1890

Synonyms
- Cypraea (Semitrivia) Cossmann, 1903 (original rank)

= Semitrivia =

Genus of gastropods

Semitrivia is a genus of small sea snails, marine gastropod molluscs in the family Triviidae, the false cowries or trivias.

== Species ==
Species within the genus Semitrivia include:

- Semitrivia calvitia Fehse, 2017
- †Semitrivia erugata (Tate, 1890)
- Semitrivia hallucinata (Liltved, 1984)
- Semitrivia tsuchidai Fehse, 2002

Synonym

- Semitrivia desirabilis (Iredale, 1912): synonym of Trivellona desirabilis (Iredale, 1912)
