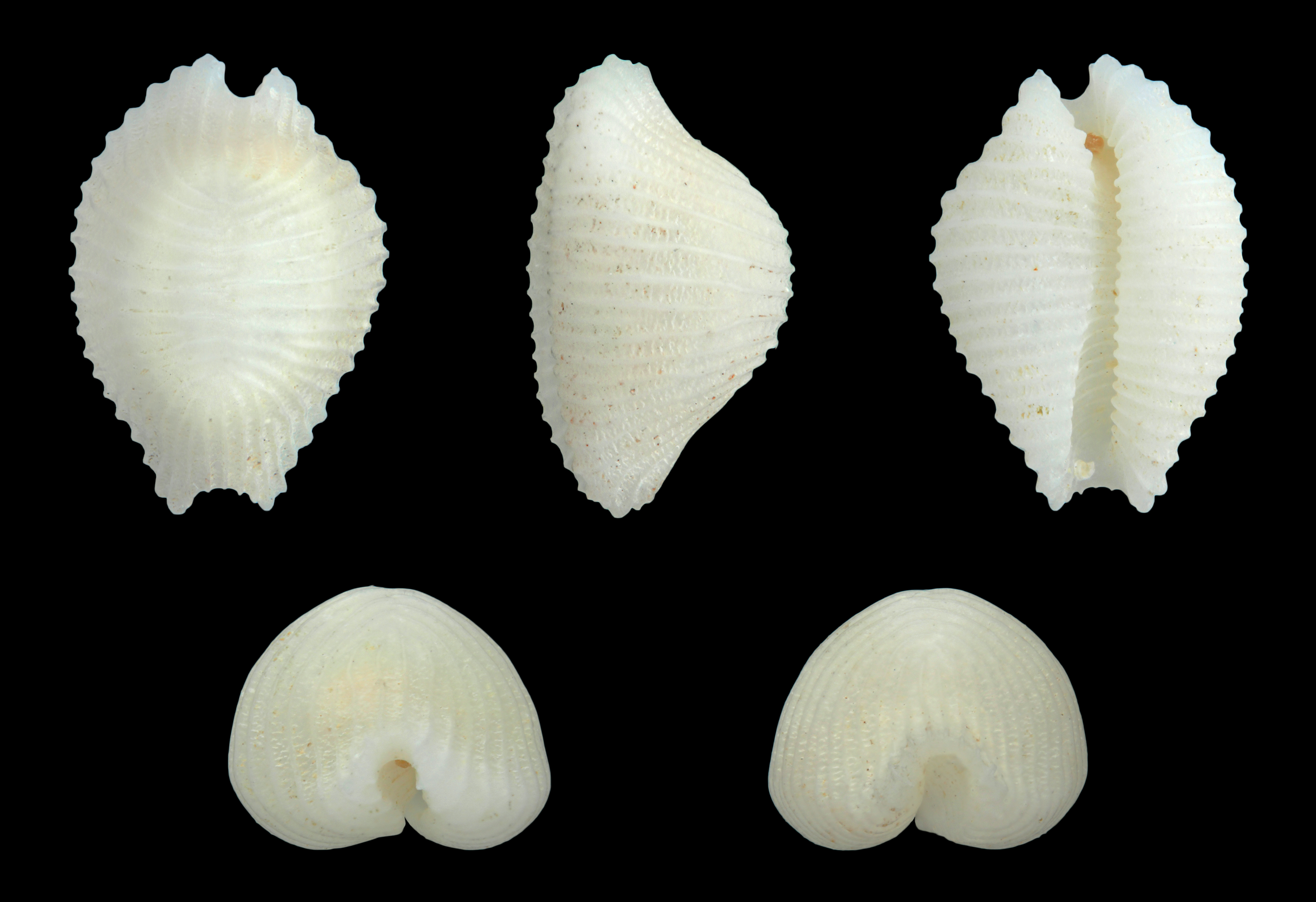
- Dolichupis producta (Gaskoin, 1836)

Scientific classification
- Kingdom: Animalia
- Phylum: Mollusca
- Class: Gastropoda
- Subclass: Caenogastropoda
- Order: Littorinimorpha
- Superfamily: Cypraeoidea
- Family: Triviidae
- Genus: Dolichupis; Iredale, 1930

Type species
- Cypraea producta Gaskoin, 1836

Synonyms
- Decoriatrivia C. N. Cate, 1979; Pusula (Dolichupis) Iredale, 1930

= Dolichupis =

Genus of gastropods

Dolichupis is a genus of small sea snails, marine gastropod mollusks in the family Triviidae, the false cowries or trivias.

== Species ==
Species within the genus Dolichupis include:

- Dolichupis acutidentata (Gaskoin, 1836)
- Dolichupis akangus Simone & Cunha, 2012
- Dolichupis artema (C. N. Cate, 1979)
- Dolichupis burius (C. N. Cate, 1979)
- Dolichupis cicatrosa (G. B. Sowerby II, 1870)
- Dolichupis citeria (C. N. Cate, 1979)
- † Dolichupis clypeus Dolin, 1991
- Dolichupis derkai Fehse & Grego, 2002
- Dolichupis dorsennus (C. N. Cate, 1979)
- Dolichupis halians (C. N. Cate, 1979)
- Dolichupis iota (C. N. Cate, 1979)
- Dolichupis janae (Lorenz, 2001)
- Dolichupis leei Fehse & Grego, 2010
- Dolichupis leucosphaera (Schilder, 1931)
- Dolichupis malvabasis Dolin, 2001
- Dolichupis mediagibber Fehse & Grego, 2010
- Dolichupis meridionalis (C. N. Cate, 1979)
- Dolichupis myrae (G. B. Campbell, 1961)
- Dolichupis panamensis (Dall, 1902)
- Dolichupis paucilirata (G. B. Sowerby II, 1870)
- Dolichupis pingius Simone & Cunha, 2012
- Dolichupis producta (Gaskoin, 1836)
- Dolichupis ritteri (Raymond, 1903)
- Dolichupis rubinicolor (Gaskoin, 1836)
- Dolichupis tindigei Fehse & Grego, 2010
- Dolichupis vemacola (Liltved, 1987)
- Dolichupis virgo Fehse & Grego, 2005

Species brought into synonymy

- Dolichupis pulloidea (Dall & Ochsner, 1928): synonym of Pseudopusula galapagensis (Melvill, 1900)
