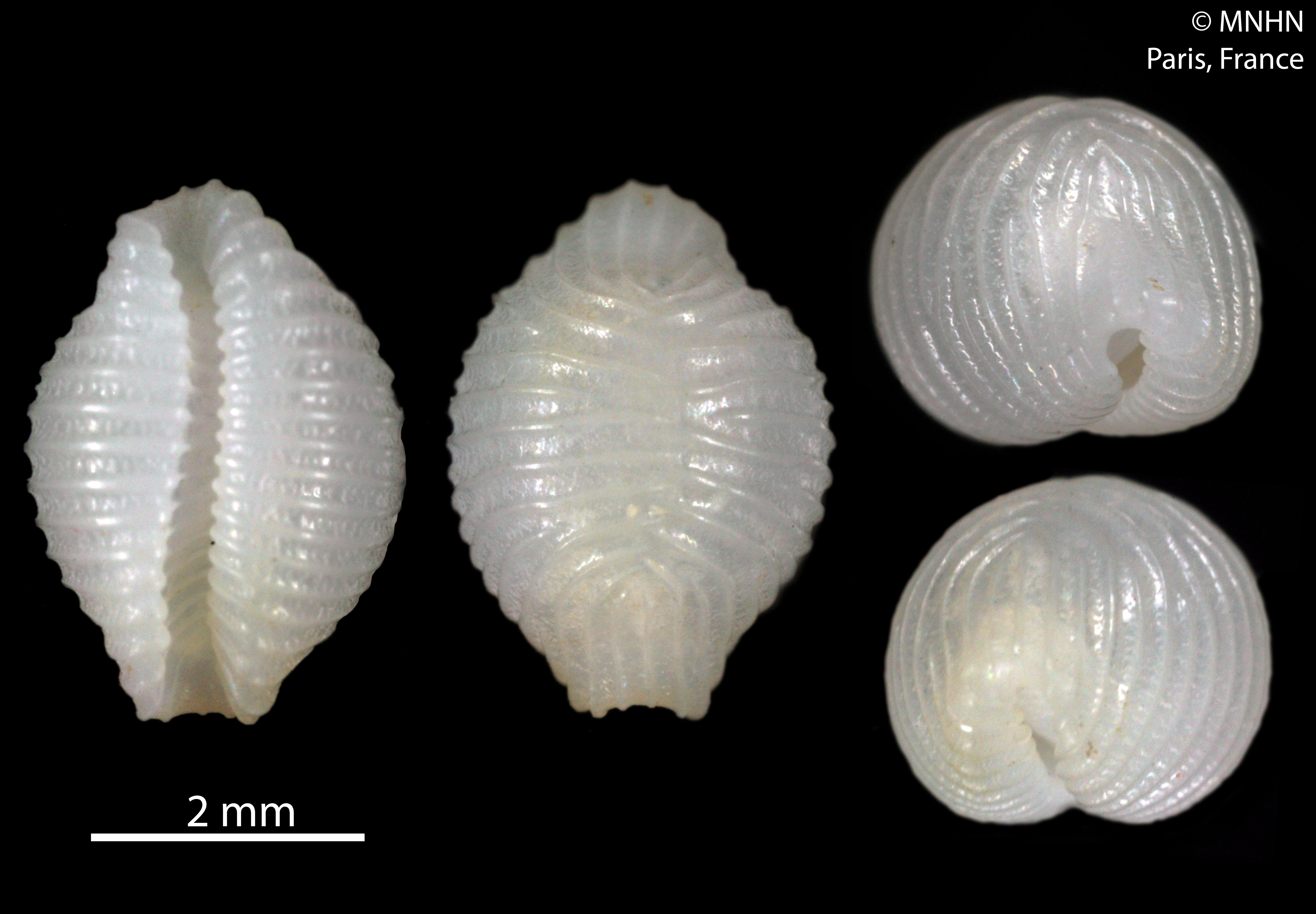
- Purpurcapsula bayeri

Scientific classification
- Kingdom: Animalia
- Phylum: Mollusca
- Class: Gastropoda
- Subclass: Caenogastropoda
- Order: Littorinimorpha
- Family: Triviidae
- Genus: Purpurcapsula; Fehse & Grego, 2009

Type species
- Cypraea fimbriata Gmelin, 1791

= Purpurcapsula =

Genus of gastropods

Purpurcapsula is a genus of small sea snails, marine gastropod mollusks in the family Triviidae, the false cowries or trivias.

== Species ==
Species within the genus Purpurcapsula include:

- Purpurcapsula bayeri (Fehse, 1998)
- Purpurcapsula corinneae (Shaw, 1909)
- Purpurcapsula erythrostigma Fehse, 2017
- Purpurcapsula exigua (Gray, 1831)
- Purpurcapsula incisura Fehse, 2017
- Purpurcapsula laurae Fehse, 2015
- Purpurcapsula polynesiae (C. N. Cate, 1979)
- Purpurcapsula pulcherrima Fehse, 2017
- Purpurcapsula rubramaculosa (Fehse & Grego, 2002)
- Purpurcapsula zzyzyxia (Cate, 1979)
