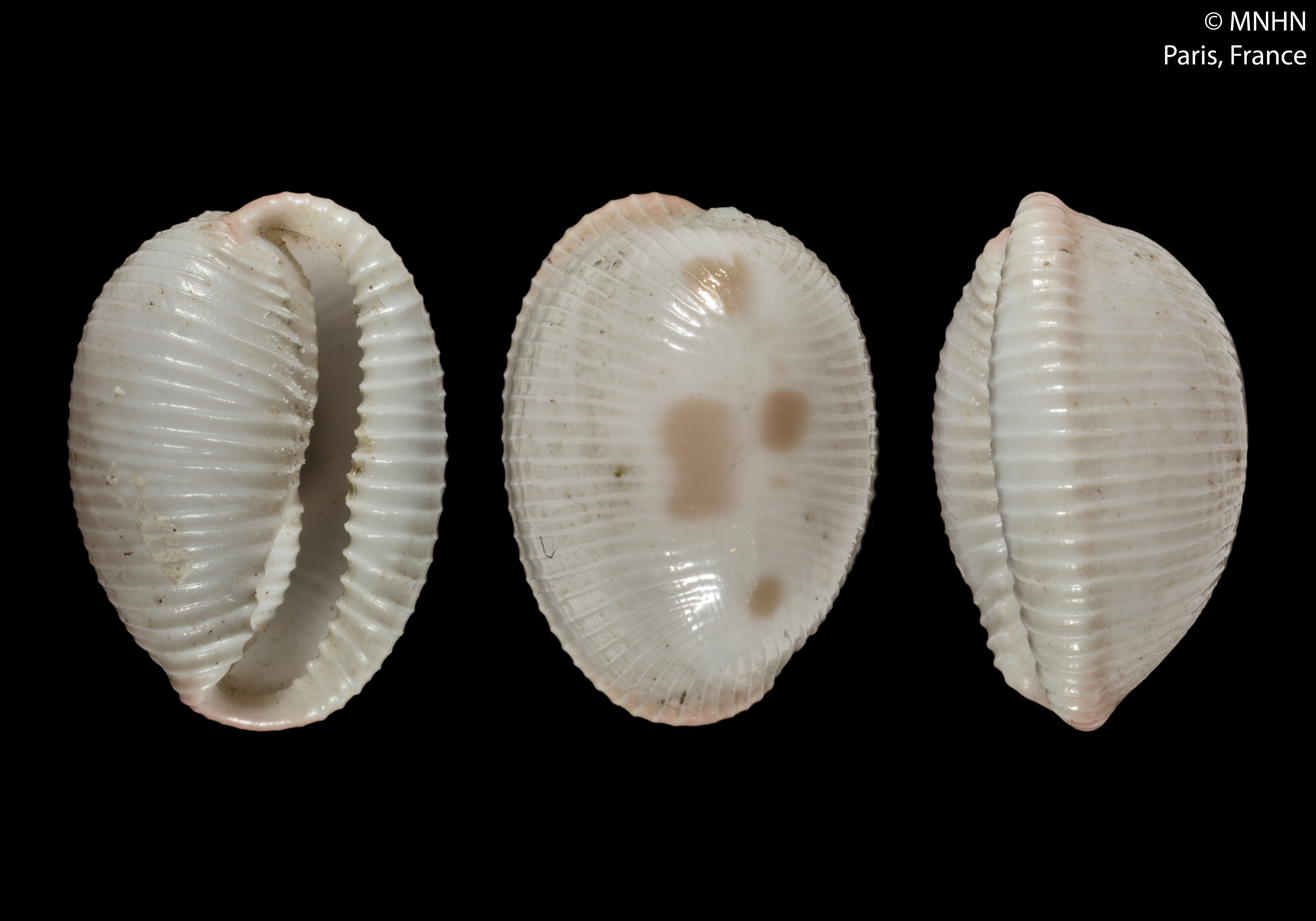
- Shell of Ellatrivia merces (syntype at MNHN, Paris)

Scientific classification
- Kingdom: Animalia
- Phylum: Mollusca
- Class: Gastropoda
- Subclass: Caenogastropoda
- Order: Littorinimorpha
- Superfamily: Cypraeoidea
- Family: Triviidae
- Genus: Ellatrivia; Cotton & Godfrey, 1932

Type species
- Triviella merces Iredale, 1924

Synonyms
- Austrotrivia Fehse, 2002; Ellatrivia Iredale, 1931 ·(name unavailable (no diagnosis)); Fossatrivia Schilder, 1939; Niveria (Ellatrivia) Cotton & Godfrey, 1932 superseded rank

= Ellatrivia =

Genus of gastropods

Ellatrivia is a genus of small sea snails, marine gastropod mollusks in the family Triviidae, the false cowries or trivias.

== Nomenclature ==
Under Art. 13.1 of the ICZN Code, the name Ellatrivia Iredale (1931) is not available because Iredale did not provide a description.

== Species ==
Species within the genus Ellatrivia include:

- † Ellatrivia aequiflora (Laws, 1941)
- † Ellatrivia antipodum F. A. Schilder, 1935
- Ellatrivia bipunctata (Odhner, 1917)
- Ellatrivia caelatura (Hedley, 1918)
- † Ellatrivia columellaris (F. A. Schilder, 1941)
- † Ellatrivia constricta (F. A. Schilder, 1941)
- † Ellatrivia crassicostata F. A. Schilder, 1935
- Ellatrivia cydarum (C. N. Cate, 1979)
- Ellatrivia detavorai Fehse & Grego, 2010
- Ellatrivia exmouthensis (C. N. Cate, 1979)
- † Ellatrivia goudeyi Fehse & Grego, 2012
- † Ellatrivia iredalei F. A. Schilder, 1935
- † Ellatrivia kaiparaensis Laws, 1939
- Ellatrivia longisulcata F. A. Schilder
- Ellatrivia merces (Iredale, 1924)
- † Ellatrivia minima (Tenison Woods, 1879)
- Ellatrivia oryzoidea (Iredale, 1935)
- † Ellatrivia torquayensis F. A. Schilder, 1935
- † Ellatrivia zealandica (Kirk, 1882)

Species brought into synonymy

- Ellatrivia memorata (Finlay, 1926): synonym of Ellatrivia merces (Iredale, 1924)
- † Ellatrivia wirrata Ludbrook, 1941: synonym of † Trivellona wirrata (Ludbrook, 1941) (superseded combination)
