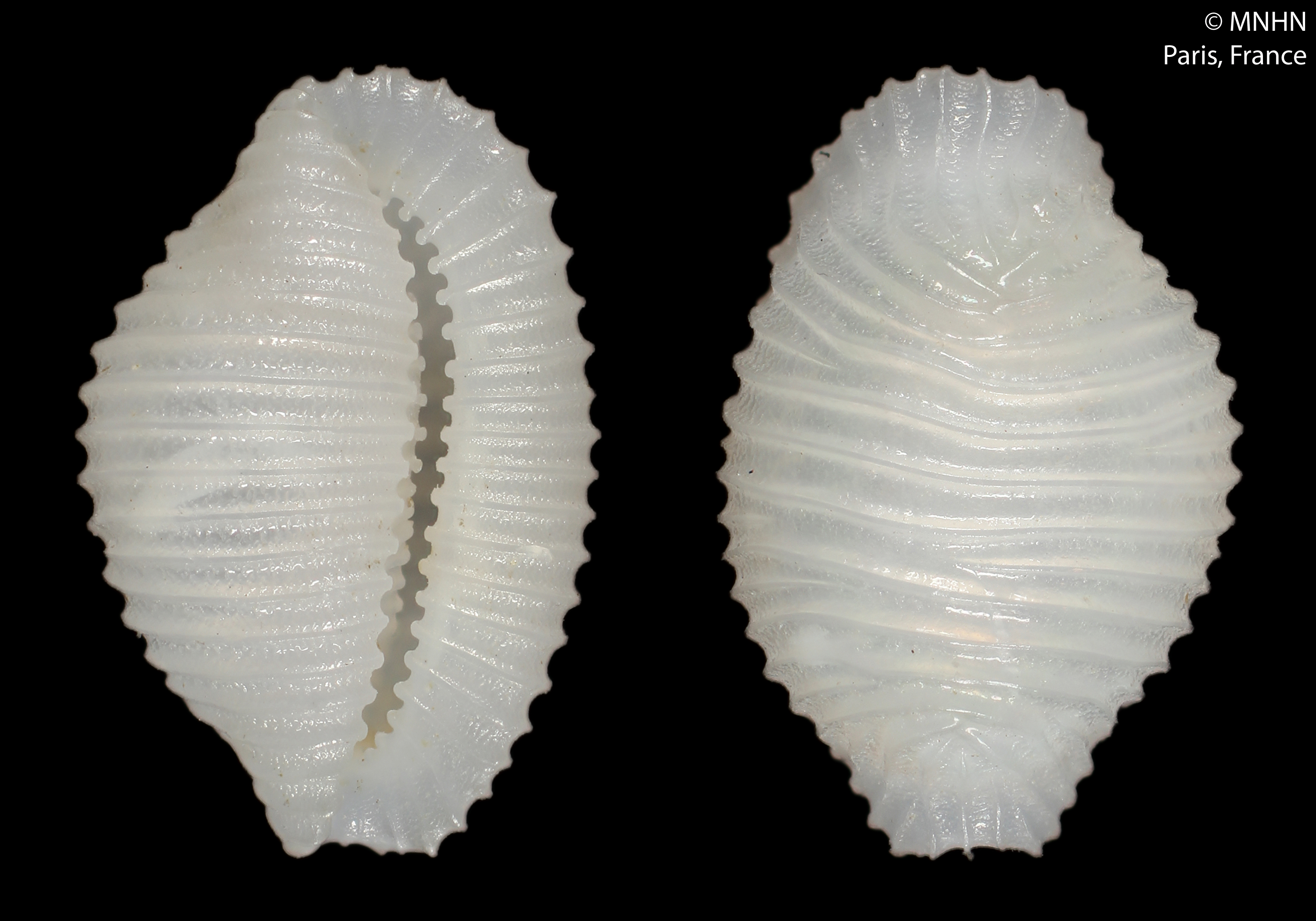
- Shell of Gregoia mauricetteae (holotype at MNHN, Paris)

Scientific classification
- Kingdom: Animalia
- Phylum: Mollusca
- Class: Gastropoda
- Subclass: Caenogastropoda
- Order: Littorinimorpha
- Superfamily: Cypraeoidea
- Family: Triviidae
- Genus: Gregoia; Fehse, 2015

Type species
- Gregoia mauricetteaeFehse, 2015

= Gregoia =

Genus of gastropods

Gregoia is a genus of small sea snails, marine gastropod mollusks in the family Triviidae, the false cowries or trivias.

== Species ==
Species within the genus Gregoia include:

- Gregoia aemula Fehse, 2015
- Gregoia albamargarita Fehse, 2015
- Gregoia albengai Fehse, 2015
- Gregoia alta Fehse, 2017
- Gregoia ariejansseni Fehse, 2017
- Gregoia barbarabugeae Fehse, 2017
- Gregoia boucheti Fehse, 2015
- Gregoia brami Fehse, 2017
- Gregoia crassilabra Fehse, 2017
- Gregoia danielleae Fehse, 2015
- Gregoia densedentata Fehse, 2015
- Gregoia distantia Fehse, 2015
- Gregoia dorsorotunda Fehse, 2017
- Gregoia eua Fehse, 2017
- Gregoia formosa Fehse, 2015
- Gregoia hypsocollis Fehse, 2017
- Gregoia josephica Fehse, 2017
- Gregoia latilabra Fehse, 2017
- Gregoia mariecatherinae Fehse, 2015
- Gregoia mauricetteae Fehse, 2015
- Gregoia multidentata Fehse, 2017
- Gregoia nuda Fehse, 2017
- Gregoia oscilla Fehse, 2017
- Gregoia paenegloba Fehse, 2015
- Gregoia peregrina Fehse, 2017
- Gregoia petitdevoizei Fehse, 2015
- Gregoia prunum Fehse, 2017
- Gregoia ramosa Fehse, 2017
- Gregoia rimatara Fehse, 2015
- Gregoia salebrosa Fehse, 2017
- Gregoia tenera Fehse, 2015
- Gregoia tonga Fehse, 2017
- Gregoia umera Fehse, 2017
- Gregoia vitrosphaera (Dolin, 2001)
- Gregoia vorago Fehse, 2015
- Gregoia yurikantori Fehse, 2015
