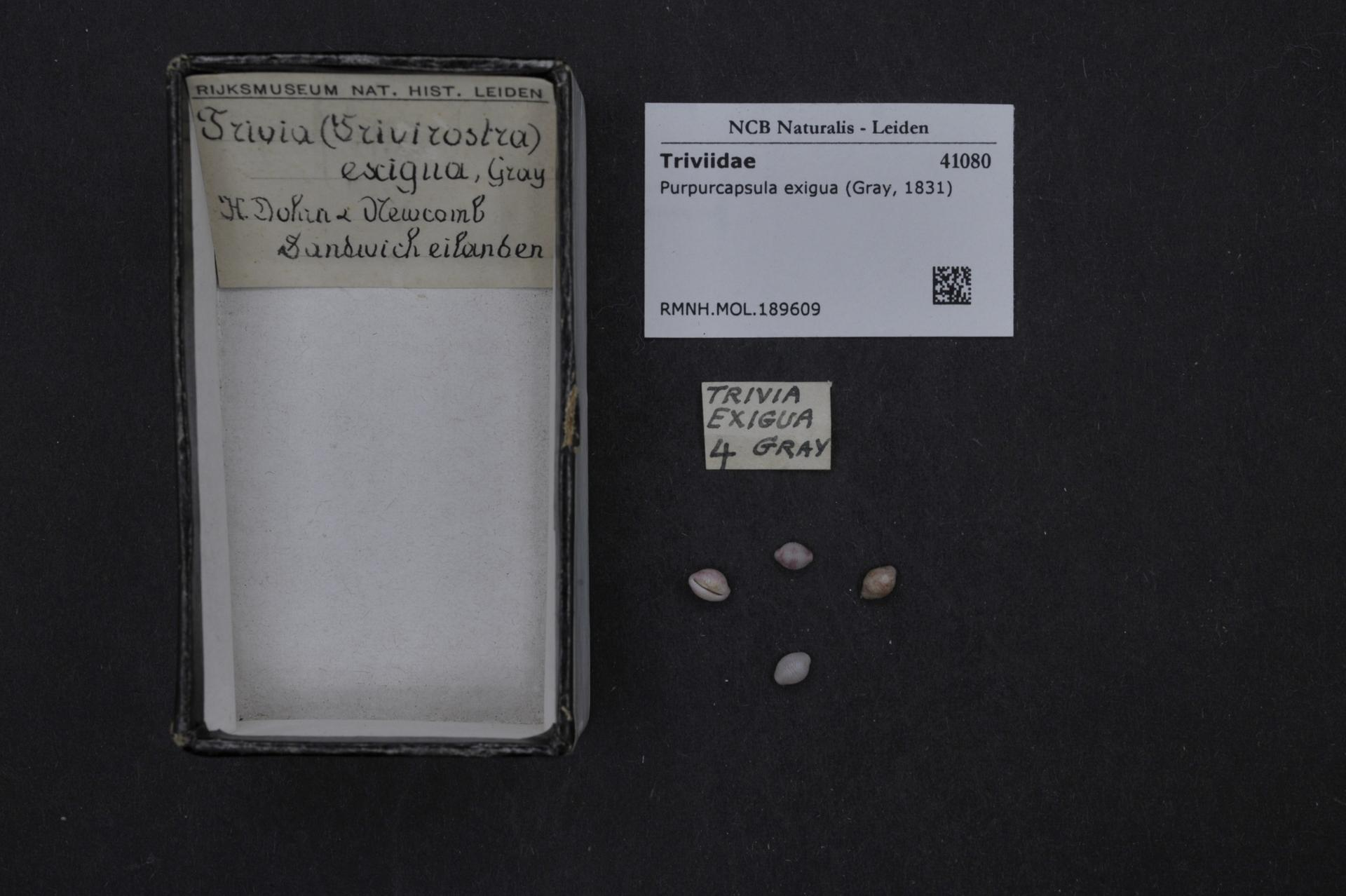

Scientific classification
- Kingdom: Animalia
- Phylum: Mollusca
- Class: Gastropoda
- Subclass: Caenogastropoda
- Order: Littorinimorpha
- Family: Triviidae
- Genus: Purpurcapsula
- Species: P. exigua

Binomial name
- Purpurcapsula exigua (Gray, 1831)

Synonyms
- Austrotrivia exigua (Gray, 1831); Trivia exigua (Gray, 1831); Trivirostra exigua (Gray, 1831)

= Purpurcapsula exigua =

Species of gastropod

Purpurcapsula exigua is a species of small sea snail, a marine gastropod mollusk in the family Triviidae, the false cowries or trivias.

== Distribution ==
This species occurs in the Red Sea and in the Indian Ocean along the Mascarene Basin.
