= Purpurcapsula rubramaculosa =

Scientific classification
- Kingdom: Animalia
- Phylum: Mollusca
- Class: Gastropoda
- Subclass: Caenogastropoda
- Order: Littorinimorpha
- Family: Triviidae
- Genus: Purpurcapsula
- Species: P. rubramaculosa

Binomial name
- Purpurcapsula rubramaculosa (Fehse & Grego, 2002)

Synonyms
- Austrotrivia rubramaculosa (Fehse & Grego, 2002); Trivirostra rubramaculosa Fehse & Grego, 2002 (basionym)

Species of gastropod

Purpurcapsula rubramaculosa is a species of small sea snail, a marine gastropod mollusk in the family Triviidae, the false cowries or trivias.
