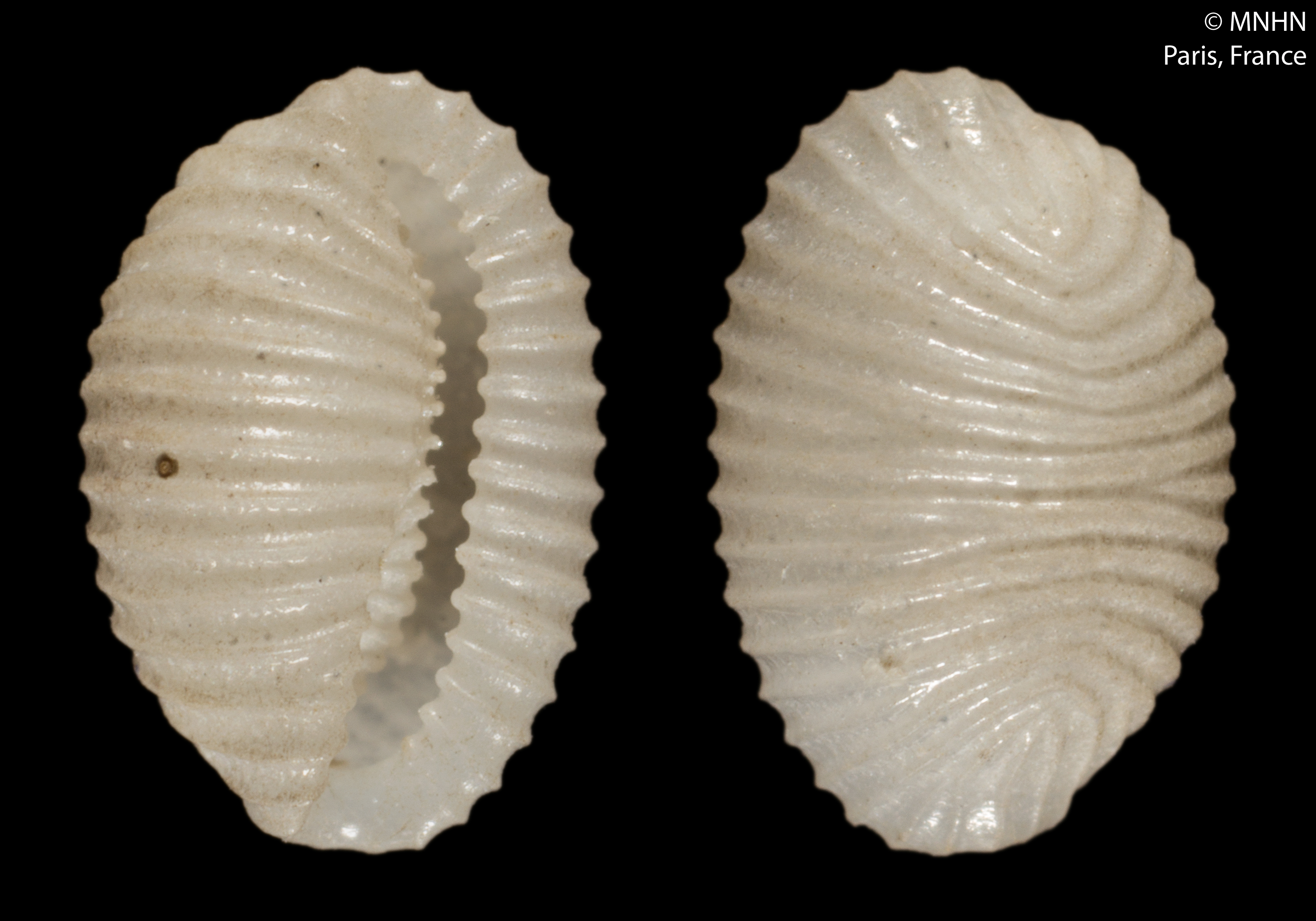
- Shell of Novatrivia far (holotype at MNHN, Paris)

Scientific classification
- Kingdom: Animalia
- Phylum: Mollusca
- Class: Gastropoda
- Subclass: Caenogastropoda
- Order: Littorinimorpha
- Superfamily: Cypraeoidea
- Family: Triviidae
- Genus: Novatrivia; Fehse, 2015

Type species
- Novatrivia mirabilis Fehse, 2015

= Novatrivia =

Genus of gastropods

Novatrivia is a genus of small sea snails, marine gastropod molluscs in the family Triviidae, the false cowries or trivias.

== Species ==
- Novatrivia far Fehse, 2015
- Novatrivia mirabilis Fehse, 2015
- Novatrivia taiwanica Fehse, 2015

== Distribution ==
This marine genus occurs off Taiwan, the Philippines and French Polynesia.
