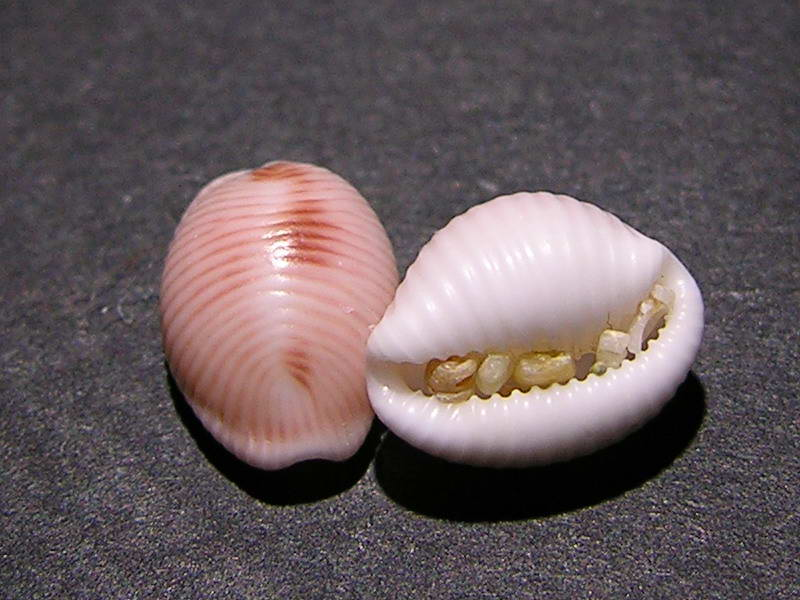
- Beachworn shells of Trivia monacha from Spain, with sand grains stuck in the apertures

Scientific classification
- Kingdom: Animalia
- Phylum: Mollusca
- Class: Gastropoda
- Subclass: Caenogastropoda
- Order: Littorinimorpha
- Superfamily: Cypraeoidea
- Family: Triviidae; Troschel, 1863

Synonyms
- Pusulini Schilder, 1936; Triviellini Schilder, 1939; Triviinae Troschel, 1863· accepted, alternate representation

= Triviidae =

Family of gastropods

Triviidae is a taxonomic family of small sea snails, marine gastropod molluscs in the superfamily Cypraeoidea of the order Littorinimorpha.

== Taxonomy ==
The following subfamilies were recognized in the taxonomy of Bouchet & Rocroi in 2005:

- Eratoinae Gill, 1871
  - tribe Eratoini Gill, 1871
  - † tribe Johnstrupiini Schilder, 1939
  - † tribe Eratotriviini Schilder, 1936
- Triviinae Troschel, 1863: represented as Triviidae Troschel, 1863

In the Taxonomy of the Gastropoda (Bouchet et al., 2017) Eratoinae is now recognized as the family Eratoidae and Triviinae is considered an alternate representation of Triviidae.

== Genera ==
Genera within the family Triviidae include:

- Subfamily Eratoinae has been raised to the status of family Eratoidae, Gill, 1871.
- Subfamily Triviinae (alternate representation of Triviidae)
  - Cleotrivia Iredale, 1930
  - Discotrivia C. N. Cate, 1979
  - Dolichupis Iredale, 1930
  - Ellatrivia Schilder, 1939
  - Gregoia Fehse, 2015
  - Niveria Jousseaume, 1884
  - Novatrivia Fehse, 2015
  - † Prototrivia Schilder, 1941
  - Pseudopusula Fehse & Grego, 2014
  - Purpurcapsula Fehse & Grego, 2009
  - Pusula Jousseaume, 1884
  - Quasipusula Fehse & Grego, 2014
  - Semitrivia Cossmann, 1903
  - Trivellona Iredale, 1931
  - Trivia Broderip, 1837
  - Triviella Jousseaume, 1884
  - Trivirostra Jousseaume 1884

Genera brought into synonymy

- Austrotrivia Fehse, 2002: synonym of Ellatrivia Cotton & Godfrey, 1932
- Circumscapula Cate, 1979: synonym of Niveria Jousseaume, 1884
- Decoriatrivia Cate, 1979: synonym of Dolichupis Iredale, 1930
- Discotrivia Cate, 1979: synonym of Pseudopusula Fehse & Grego, 2014
- Fossatrivia Schilder, 1939: synonym of Ellatrivia Cotton & Godfrey, 1932
- Galeatrivia Cate, 1979: synonym of Triviella Jousseaume, 1884
- Nototrivia Schilder, 1939 †: synonym of Trivellona Iredale, 1931
- Pseudotrivia Schilder, 1936: synonym of Trivellona Iredale, 1931
- Tribe Pusulini Schilder, 1936: synonym of Triviinae Troschel, 1863
- Robertotrivia Cate, 1979: synonym of Trivellona Iredale, 1931
- Sulcotrivia Schilder, 1933 †: synonym of Niveria Jousseaume, 1884
- Tribe Triviellini Schilder, 1939: synonym of Triviinae Troschel, 1863
