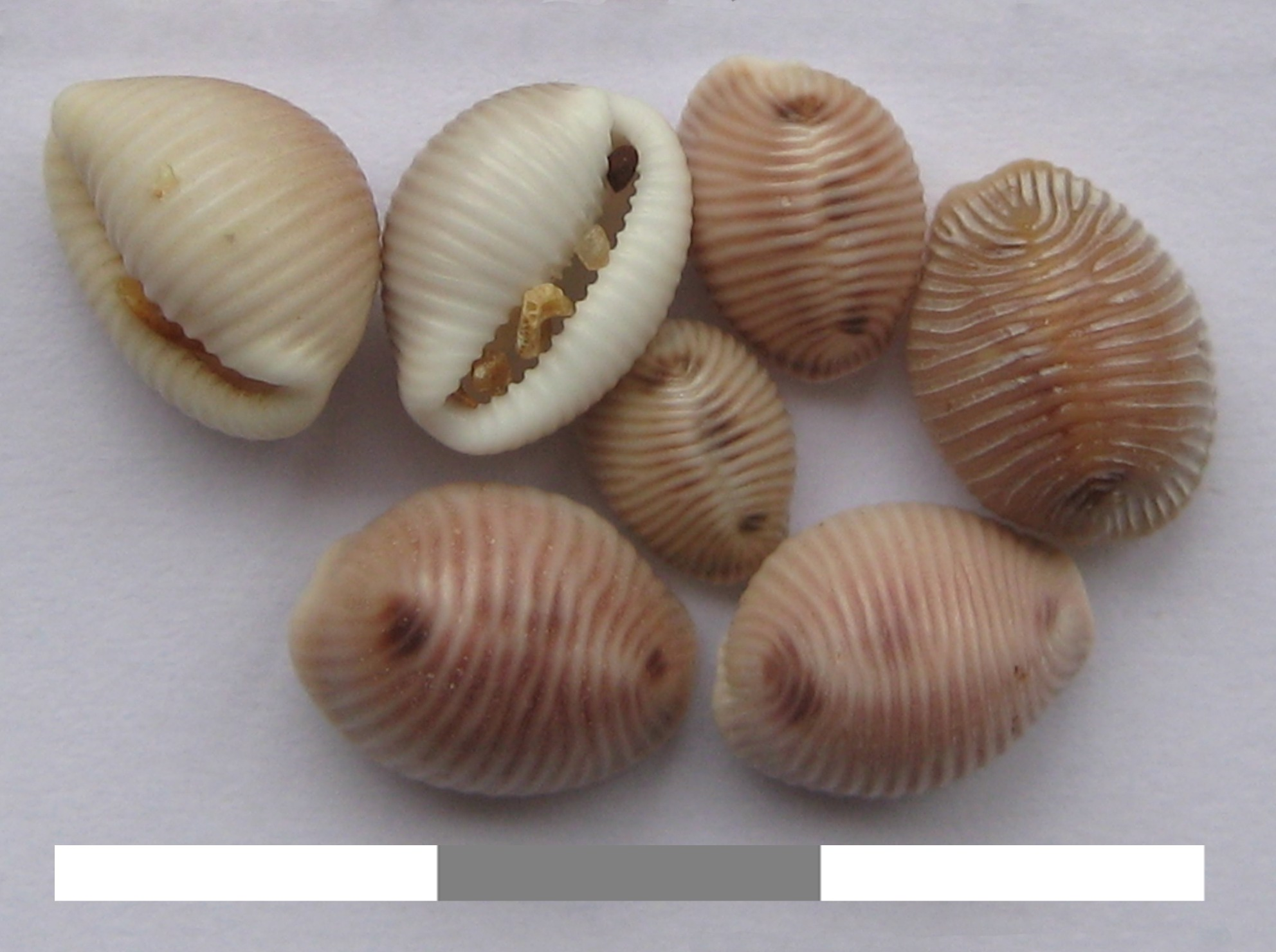
- Seven shells of Trivia monacha from beach drift near Aberffraw, Anglesey. Scale is in cm.

Scientific classification
- Kingdom: Animalia
- Phylum: Mollusca
- Class: Gastropoda
- Subclass: Caenogastropoda
- Order: Littorinimorpha
- Family: Triviidae
- Subfamily: Triviinae
- Genus: Trivia; Gray, 1837

Type species
- Cypraea europaea Montagu, 1808

= Trivia (gastropod) =

Genus of molluscs

Trivia is a genus of small sea snails, marine gastropod molluscs in the family Triviidae, the trivias.

These are known in Britain as "cowries". The shell of these species does superficially resemble the shell of a very small cowry, but Trivia species are not very closely related to true cowries.

== Species ==
The genus Trivia has recently been split into many genera, including Cleotrivia, Niveria, Pusula, Triviella, Trivirostra etc., but this information is not yet shown completely in the species list below. There is currently no consensus about definition of the genera backed by a reliable phylogenetic scheme, for which reason all European species in the ERMS context are maintained under genus Trivia, around the type species Trivia arctica.

Species within the genus Trivia include, according to the World Register of Marine Species (WoRMS)

- Trivia arctica (Pulteney, 1799) – unspotted cowrie, northern cowrie, in Scotland a "groatie-buckie"
- Trivia candidula Gaskoin, 1836 – little white trivia,
- †Trivia coccinelloides (J. de C. Sowerby I, 1822)
- Trivia cylindrica Dolin, 2001
- Trivia dakarensis Schilder, 1967
- Trivia grohorum (Fehse & Grego, 2008)
- Trivia leditae Rios, 2009
- Trivia levantina (Smriglio, Mariottini & Buzzurro, 1998)
- Trivia mediterranea (Risso, 1826)
- † Trivia merlini Fehse & Van de Haar, 2015
- Trivia monacha (da Costa, 1778) – spotted cowrie
- Trivia multilirata (Sowerby II, 1870)
- Trivia napolina (Kiener, 1843)
- † Trivia parvula Schilder, 1933
- † Trivia pinguior Marwick, 1926
- Trivia spongicola (Monterosato, 1923)
- † Trivia testudinella S.V. Wood, 1842 †

Species named in other databases

- Trivia californiana (Gray, 1827) – California trivia
- Trivia sanguinea (Sowerby, 1832)
- Trivia solandri (Sowerby, 1832) – Solander's trivia

Species brought into synonymy

- Trivia abyssicola Schepman, 1909: synonym of Trivellona abyssicola (Schepman, 1909)
- Trivia acuminata Schilder, 1932: synonym of Trivia monacha (da Costa, 1778)
- Trivia acutisulcata Kenyon, 1900: synonym of Cleotrivia globosa (Gray in G. B. Sowerby II, 1832)
- Trivia affinis Marrat, 1867: synonym of Purpurcapsula corinneae (Shaw, 1909)
- Trivia antillarum Schilder, 1922 – Antilles trivia: synonym of Cleotrivia antillarum (Schilder, 1922)
- Trivia aperta (Swainson, 1822): synonym of Triviella aperta (Swainson, 1822)
- Trivia atomaria Dall, 1902: synonym of Cleotrivia atomaria (Dall, 1902)
- Trivia bipunctata Odhner, 1917: synonym of Ellatrivia bipunctata (Odhner, 1917)
- Trivia bitou Pallary, 1912: synonym of Trivia candidula (Gaskoin, 1836)
- Trivia caelatura Hedley, 1918: synonym of Ellatrivia caelatura (Hedley, 1918)
- Trivia calvariola Kilburn, 1980: synonym of Triviella calvariola (Kilburn, 1980)
- † Trivia canariensis Rothpletz & Simonelli, 1890: synonym of † Pseudopusula canariensis (Rothpletz & Simonelli, 1890)
- Trivia corinneae Shaw, 1909: synonym of Purpurcapsula corinneae (Shaw, 1909)
- Trivia corrugata Pease, 1868: synonym of Trivirostra corrugata (Pease, 1868)
- Trivia cosmoi Dautzenberg, 1921: synonym of Cleotrivia globosa (Gray in G. B. Sowerby II, 1832)
- Trivia costata (Gmelin, 1791): synonym of Triviella costata (Gmelin, 1791)
- Trivia dalmatica Coen, 1937: synonym of Trivia multilirata (G. B. Sowerby II, 1870)
- Trivia dartevellei Knudsen, 1955: synonym of Pseudopusula depauperata (G. B. Sowerby I, 1832)
- Trivia debruini Lorenz, 1994: synonym of Triviella goslineri (Liltved & Millard, 1994)
- Trivia desirabilis Iredale, 1912: synonym of Semitrivia desirabilis (Iredale, 1912)
- Trivia dorsolevigata Schilder, 1932: synonym of Trivia arctica (Pulteney, 1799)
- Trivia edgari Shaw, 1909: synonym of Trivirostra edgari (Shaw, 1909)
- Trivia elsiae Howard & Sphon, 1960: synonym of Pusula elsiae (Howard & Sphon, 1960)
- Trivia eos Roberts, 1913: synonym of Trivellona eos (Roberts, 1913)
- Trivia eratoides Liltved, 1986: synonym of Trivellona eratoides (Liltved, 1986)
- Trivia europaea (Montagu, 1808): synonym of Trivia monacha (da Costa, 1778)
- Trivia exigua (Gray, 1832): synonym of Trivirostra exigua (Gray, 1831)
- Trivia flora Marwick, 1928: synonym of Trivia zealandica Kirk, 1882: synonym of † Ellatrivia zealandica (Kirk, 1882)
- Trivia gaskoini Roberts, 1870: synonym of Trivirostra scabriuscula (Gray, 1827)
- Trivia globosa (Sowerby II, 1832): synonym of Cleotrivia globosa (Gray in G.B. Sowerby II, 1832)
- Trivia globulosa Locard & Caziot, 1900: synonym of Trivia arctica (Pulteney, 1799)
- Trivia goslineri Liltved & Millard, 1994: synonym of Triviella goslineri (Liltved & Millard, 1994)
- Trivia hallucinata Liltved, 1984: synonym of Semitrivia hallucinata (Liltved, 1984)
- Trivia hispania Cate, 1979: synonym of Trivia arctica (Pulteney, 1799)
- Trivia hordacea (Keiner, 1843): synonym of Trivirostra hordacea (Kiener, 1843)
- Trivia hybrida Schilder, 1931: synonym of Pusula hybrida (Schilder, 1931)
- Trivia insecta (Mighels, 1845): synonym of Trivirostra hordacea (Kiener, 1844)
- Trivia jousseaumei Locard, 1886: synonym of Trivia monacha (da Costa, 1778)
- Trivia khanya Liltved, 1986: synonym of Triviella khanya (Liltved, 1986)
- Trivia lemaitrei Liltved, 1986: synonym of Triviella lemaitrei (Liltved, 1986)
- Trivia leucosphaera Schilder, 1931 – little white trivia: synonym of Dolichupis leucosphaera (Schilder, 1931)
- Trivia liltvedi Gofas, 1984: synonym of Niveria liltvedi (Gofas, 1984)
- Trivia magnidentata Liltved, 1986: synonym of Triviella magnidentata (Liltved, 1986)
- Trivia maltbiana Schwengel and McGinty, 1942: synonym of Pusula maltbiana (Schwengel & McGinty, 1942)
- Trivia marlowi Rosenberg & Finley, 2001: synonym of Trivellona marlowi (Rosenberg & Finley, 2001)
- Trivia massieri Martin & Poppe, 1991: synonym of Triviella massieri (Martin & Poppe, 1991)
- Trivia merces (Iredale, 1924) – New Zealand cowry: synonym of Ellatrivia merces (Iredale, 1924)
- Trivia millardi (Cate, 1979) – West Coast baby's toes: synonym of Triviella millardi (Cate, 1979)
- Trivia mollerati Locard, 1894: synonym of Trivia arctica (Pulteney, 1799)
- Trivia multicostata Liltved, 1986: synonym of Trivellona multicostata (Liltved, 1986)
- Trivia myrae Campbell, 1961: synonym of Dolichupis myrae (Campbell, 1961)
- Trivia neglecta (Schilder, 1930): synonym of Triviella neglecta Schilder, 1930
- Trivia nix (Schilder, 1922) – snowy trivia: synonym of Niveria nix (Schilder, 1922)
- Trivia oryza (Lamarck, 1810): synonym of Trivirostra oryza (Lamarck, 1810)
- Trivia occidentalis Schilder, 1922: synonym of Cleotrivia antillarum (Schilder, 1922)
- Trivia ovulata (Lamarck, 1810) – baby's toes: synonym of Triviella ovulata (Lamarck, 1811)
- Trivia pacei Petuch, 1987: synonym of Pusula cimex (G. B. Sowerby II, 1870)
- Trivia paucicostata Schepman, 1909: synonym of Trivellona paucicostata (Schepman, 1909)
- Trivia pediculus (Linnaeus, 1758) – coffeebean trivia: synonym of Pusula pediculus (Linnaeus, 1758)
- Trivia pediculus var. permagna Johnson, 1910: synonym of † Pusula permagna (Johnson, 1910)
- Trivia pellucidula (Gaskoin, 1846): synonym of Trivirostra pellucidula (Gaskoin, 1846)
- Trivia phalacra (Schilder, 1930): synonym of Triviella phalacra Schilder, 1930
- Trivia procella Cate, 1979: synonym of Trivia monacha (da Costa, 1778)
- Trivia producta (Gaskoin, 1836): synonym of Dolichupis producta (Gaskoin, 1836)
- Trivia pulex (Gray, 1827): synonym of Trivia mediterranea (Risso, 1826)
- Trivia pullicina Mollerat, 1890: synonym of Trivia mediterranea (Risso, 1826)
- Trivia quadripunctata (Gray, 1827) – four-spot trivia: synonym of Niveria quadripunctata
- Trivia ritteri Raymond, 1903: synonym of Dolichupis ritteri (Raymond, 1903)
- Trivia rubra Shaw, 1909: synonym of Triviella rubra (Shaw, 1909)
- Trivia sanctispiritus Shikama, 1974: synonym of Triviella sanctispiritus (Shikama, 1974)
- Trivia sibogae Schepman, 1909: synonym of Trivellona sibogae (Schepman, 1909)
- Trivia splendidissima (Tomlin & Schilder, 1934): synonym of Triviella splendidissima (Tomlin & Schilder, 1934)
- Trivia suavis Schilder, 1931: synonym of Trivellona suavis (Schilder, 1931)
- Trivia suffusa (Gray, 1832) – pink trivia: synonym ofNiveria suffusa
- Trivia tortuga Cate, 1979: synonym of Trivia hispania C. N. Cate, 1979 accepted as Trivia arctica (Pulteney, 1799)
- Trivia valerieae Hart, 1996: synonym of Trivellona valerieae (Hart, 1996)
- Trivia vemacola Liltved, 1987: synonym of Quasipusula vemacola (Liltved, 1987)
- Trivia verhoefi Gosliner & Liltved, 1982: synonym of Triviella verhoefi (Gosliner & Liltved, 1981)
- Trivia vesicularis (Gaskoin, 1836): synonym of Trivellona vesicularis (Gaskoin, 1836)
- Trivia virginiae Liltved, 1986: synonym of Triviella virginiae (Liltved, 1986)
- Trivia vitrosphaera Dolin, 2001: synonym of Gregoia vitrosphaera (Dolin, 2001) (original combination)
- Trivia zealandica Kirk, 1882: synonym of † Ellatrivia zealandica (Kirk, 1882)

European species: Trivia arctica, T. candidula, T. monacha and T. multirilata

Western Atlantic species with updated genera:

- Cleotrivia antillarum (Schilder, 1922)
- Cleotrivia candidula (Gaskoin, 1836)
- Cleotrivia leucosphaera (Schilder, 1931)
- Niveria nix (Schilder, 1922)
- Niveria quadripunctata (Gray, 1827)
- Niveria suffusa (Gray, 1827)
- Pusula hybrida (Schilder, 1931)
- Pusula maltbiana (Schwengel & McGinty, 1942)
- Pusula pacei (Petuch, 1987)
- Pusula pediculus (Linnaeus, 1758)
- Trivia procella Cate, 1979
- Trivirostra corinneae (Shaw, 1909) (extralimital)
