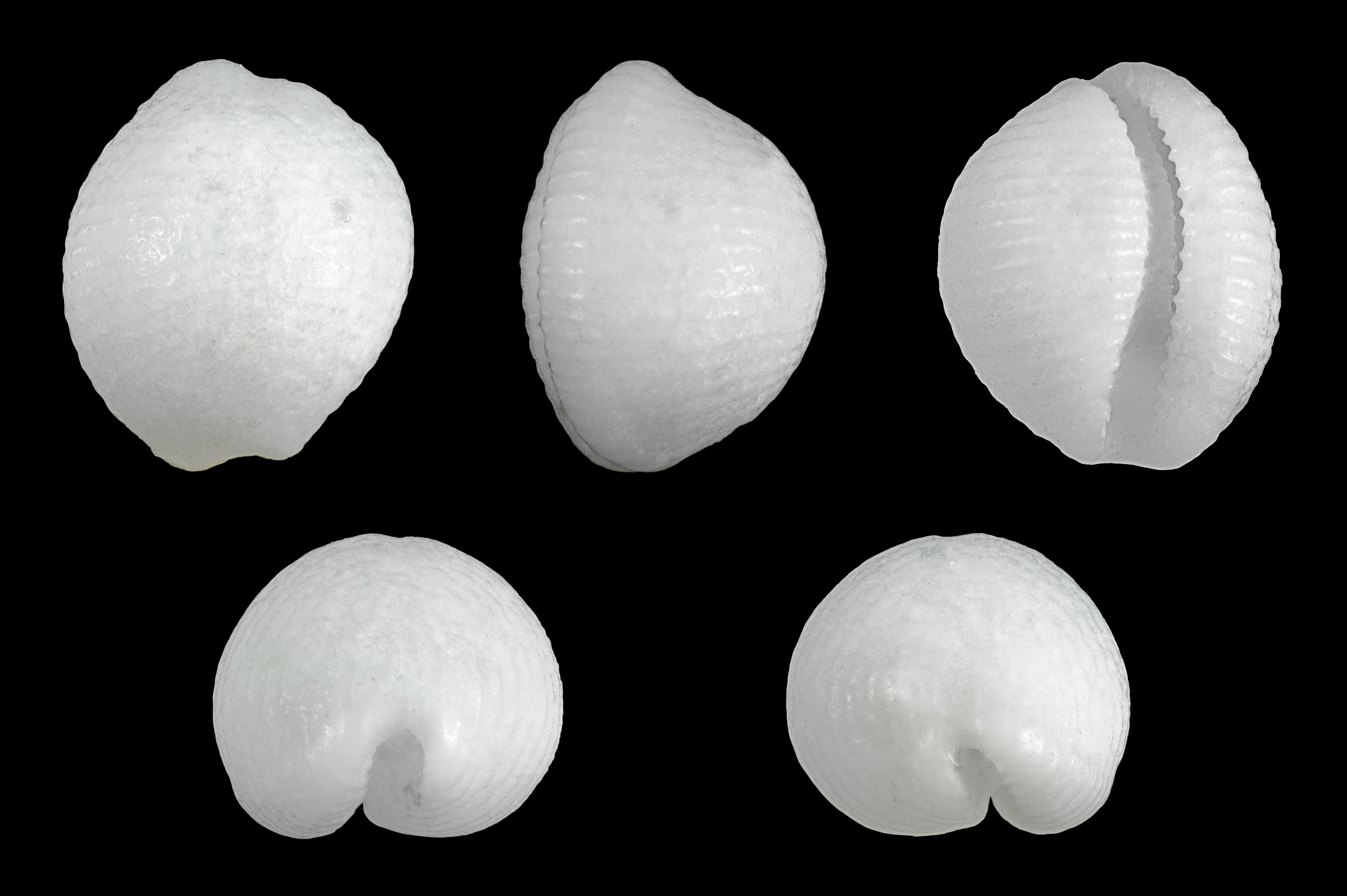
- Cleotrivia brevissima (Sowerby, 1870)

Scientific classification
- Kingdom: Animalia
- Phylum: Mollusca
- Class: Gastropoda
- Subclass: Caenogastropoda
- Order: Littorinimorpha
- Superfamily: Cypraeoidea
- Family: Triviidae
- Genus: Cleotrivia; Iredale, 1930

Type species
- Cypraea pilula Kiener, 1843

= Cleotrivia =

Genus of gastropods

Cleotrivia is a genus of small sea snails, marine gastropod mollusks in the family Triviidae, the false cowries or trivias.

== Species ==
Species within the genus Cleotrivia include:

- Cleotrivia andreiae Fehse & Grego, 2017
- Cleotrivia atomaria (Dall, 1902)
- Cleotrivia bobabeli Fehse, 2017
- Cleotrivia brevissima (Sowerby II, 1870)
- Cleotrivia coletteae (Fehse, 1999)
- Cleotrivia corallina Cate, 1979
- Cleotrivia culmen Fehse, 2004
- Cleotrivia dissimilis Fehse, 2015
- Cleotrivia euclaensis Cate, 1979
- Cleotrivia globosa (Sowerby II, 1832)
- Cleotrivia occidentalis (Schilder, 1922)
- Cleotrivia pilula (Kiener, 1843)
- Cleotrivia pisum (Gaskoin, 1846)
- Cleotrivia pygmaea (Schilder, 1931)
- Cleotrivia rustica Fehse, 2015
- Cleotrivia vitrea (Gaskoin, 1849)

Species brought into synonymy

- Cleotrivia antillarum (Schilder, 1922): synonym of Pseudopusula antillarum (Schilder, 1922)
- Cleotrivia aquatanica Cate, 1979 : synonym of Niveria nix (Schilder, 1922)
- Cleotrivia candidula (Gaskoin, 1836) : synonym of Trivia candidula (Gaskoin, 1836)
- Cleotrivia dorsennus Cate, 1979 : synonym of Dolichupis dorsennus (Cate, 1979)
- Cleotrivia leucosphaera (Schilder, 1931) : synonym of Dolichupis leucosphaera (Schilder, 1931)
- Cleotrivia meridionalis Cate, 1979 : synonym of Dolichupis meridionalis (Cate, 1979)
- Cleotrivia werneri (Fehse, 1999) alternate representation of Niveria werneri Fehse, 1999
- Cleotrivia wayiana (Cate, 1979): synonym of Decoriatrivia wayiana C. N. Cate, 1979
