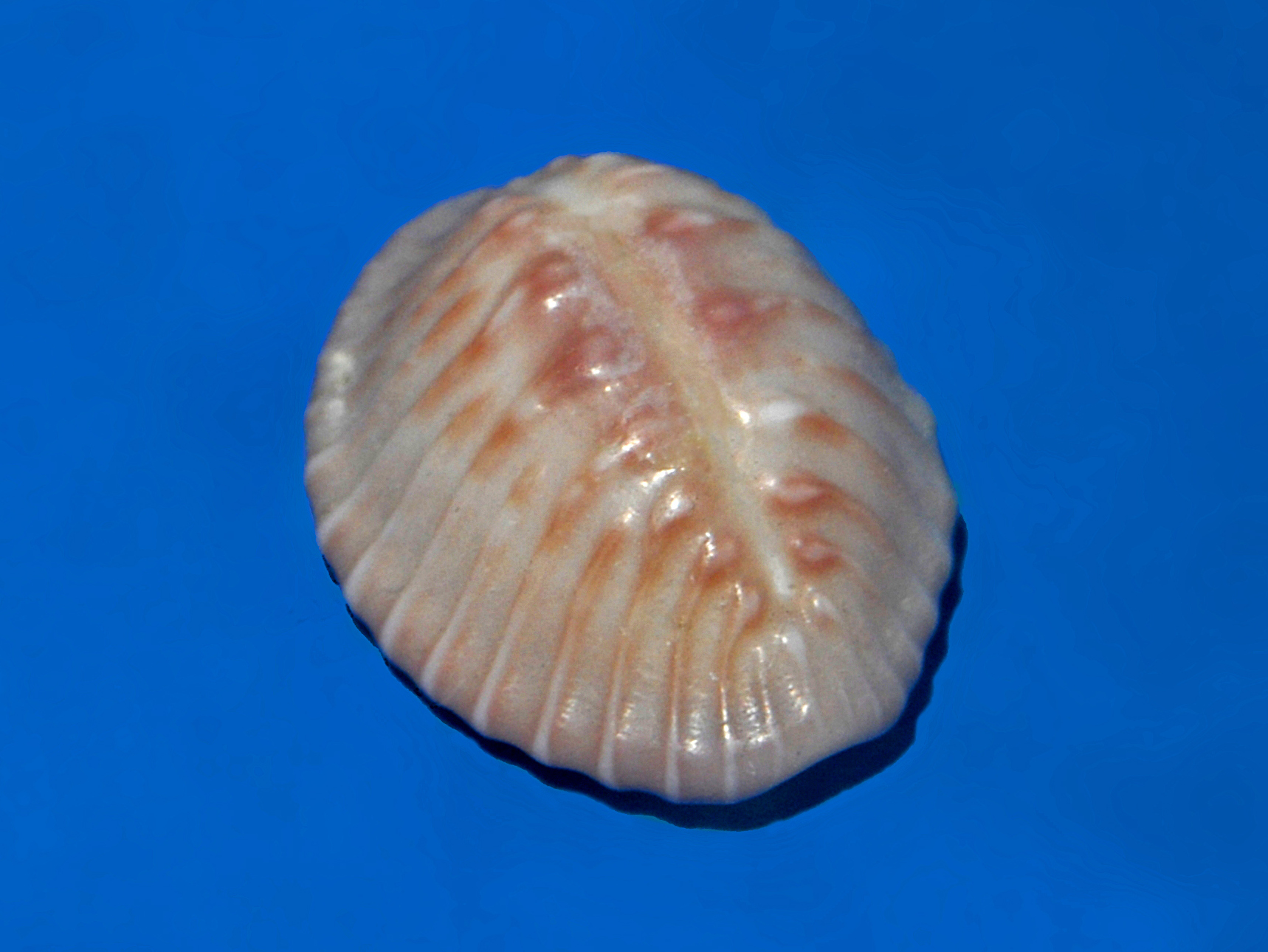
- A shell of Pusula radians from Nicaragua on display at the Museo Civico di Storia Naturale di Milano

Scientific classification
- Kingdom: Animalia
- Phylum: Mollusca
- Class: Gastropoda
- Subclass: Caenogastropoda
- Order: Littorinimorpha
- Family: Triviidae
- Genus: Pusula; Jousseaume, 1884

Type species
- Cypraea radians Lamarck, 1810

Synonyms
- Discotrivia Cate, 1979

= Pusula =

Genus of gastropods

Pusula is a genus of small sea snails, marine gastropod mollusks in the family Triviidae, the false cowries or trivias.

== Species ==
Species within the genus Pusula include:

- † Pusula alienigena Schilder, 1928
- Pusula bessei Petuch, 2013
- Pusula cimex (Sowerby II, 1870)
- Pusula costipunctata (Sowerby II, 1870)
- † Pusula dadeensis Petuch, 1994
- † Pusula dalli (Petuch, 1994)
- † Pusula densistans Fehse & Grego, 2014
- Pusula elsiae (Howard & Sphon, 1960) (nomen dubium)
- Pusula garciai Fehse & Grego, 2014
- † Pusula guppyi Schilder, 1939
- Pusula hybrida (Schilder, 1931)
- Pusula labiosa (Gaskoin, 1836)
- Pusula lindajoyceae Petuch, 1994
- † Pusula miamiensis Petuch, 1991
- † Pusula orientalis Schilder, 1939
- Pusula pediculus (Linnaeus, 1758)
- † Pusula permagna (Johnson, 1910)
- † Pusula platyventer Fehse & Grego, 2014
- Pusula pullata (Sowerby II, 1870)
- Pusula radians (Lamarck, 1810)
- Pusula solandri (Sowerby I, 1832)
- † Pusula subpediculus (Sacco, 1894)

Species brought into synonymy

- † Pusula andersoni Petuch & Drohlshagen, 2011: synonym of † Pusula lindajoyceae Petuch, 1994
- Pusula bermontiana (Petuch, 1994): synonym of Pusula pediculus (Linnaeus, 1758)
- Pusula californiana (Gray, 1827): synonym of Pseudopusula californiana (Gray, 1827)
- Pusula californica (Sowerby II, 1832): synonym of Pseudopusula californiana (Gray, 1827)
- Pusula calusa Petuch & Drolshagen, 2011: synonym of † Pusula dalli (Petuch, 1994)
- Pusula campus Cate, 1979: synonym of Niveria campus (Cate, 1979)
- Pusula candidula (Gaskoin, 1835): synonym of Trivia candidula (Gaskoin, 1836)
- Pusula carabus Cate, 1979: synonym of Niveria carabus (Cate, 1979)
- Pusula cherobia Cate, 1979: synonym of Niveria cherobia (Cate, 1979)
- Pusula crovoae Olsson, 1967: synonym of † Pusula orientalis Schilder, 1939
- Pusula depauperata (Sowerby II, 1832): synonym of Pseudopusula depauperata (Sowerby II, 1832)
- Pusula janae Lorenz, 2001: synonym of Dolichupis janae (Lorenz, 2001)
- Pusula juyingae Petuch & Sargent, 2011: synonym of Pusula labiosa (Gaskoin, 1836)
- Pusula leucosphaera Schilder, 1931: synonym of Dolichupis leucosphaera (Schilder, 1931)
- Pusula loochooensis Cate, 1979: synonym of Pseudopusula californiana (Gray, 1827)
- Pusula macaeica Fehse & Grego, 2005: synonym of Niveria macaeica (Fehse & Grego, 2005)
- Pusula maltbiana (Schwengel & McGinty, 1942): synonym of Niveria maltbiana (Schwengel & McGinty, 1942)
- Pusula olssoni Petuch & Drolshagen, 2011 †: synonym of † Pusula orientalis Schilder, 1939
- Pusula pacei (Petuch, 1987): synonym of Pusula cimex (Sowerby II, 1870)
- Pusula padreserrai Cate, 1979: synonym of Pusula solandri (Sowerby II, 1832)
- Pusula pygmaea Schilder, 1931: synonym of Cleotrivia pygmaea (Schilder, 1931)
- Pusula rubinicolor (Gaskoin, 1836): synonym of Dolichupis rubinicolor (Gaskoin, 1836)
