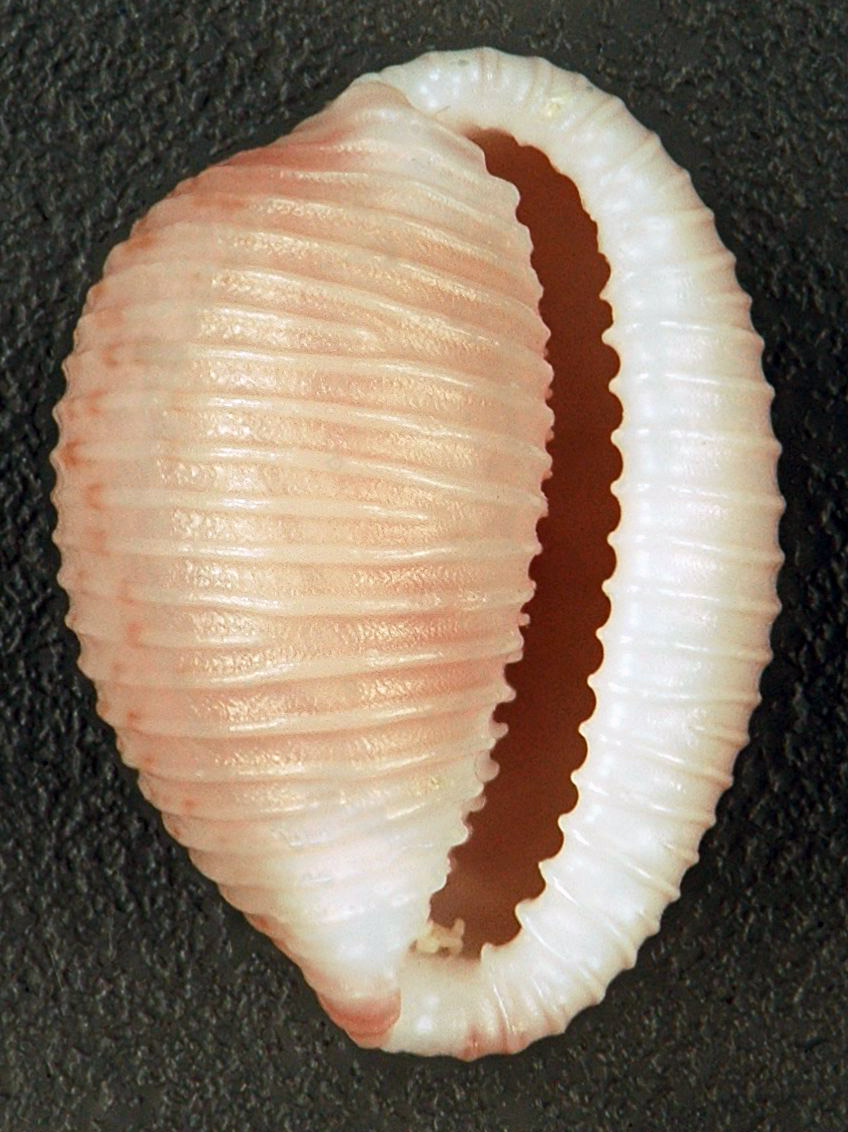
- Niveria suffusa shell

Scientific classification
- Kingdom: Animalia
- Phylum: Mollusca
- Class: Gastropoda
- Subclass: Caenogastropoda
- Order: Littorinimorpha
- Superfamily: Cypraeoidea
- Family: Triviidae
- Genus: Niveria; Jousseaume, 1884

Type species
- Cypraea nivea Sowerby II, 1832

Synonyms
- Circumscapula Cate, 1979; † Sulcotrivia Schilder, 1933

= Niveria =

Genus of gastropods

Niveria is a genus of small sea snails, marine gastropod molluscs in the family Triviidae, the false cowries or trivias.

== Species ==
Species within the genus Niveria include:

- † Niveria angliae (S. V. Wood, 1848)
- † Niveria avellana (J. de C. Sowerby, 1822)
- Niveria bieleri Fehse & Grego, 2016
- Niveria brasilica Fehse & Grego, 2005
- † Niveria callosa Fehse, 2021
- † Niveria cylindriclementi Landau, Ceulemans & Van Dingenen, 2018
- † Niveria dimidiatoaffinis (Sacco, 1894)
- † Niveria excoccinella (Sacco, 1894)
- Niveria guyana Fehse, 2016
- Niveria harriettae Fehse & Grego, 2010
- † Niveria intuscrenata (Cossmann & Pissarro, 1905)
- Niveria lathyrus (Blainville, 1826)
- † Niveria ledoni Fehse & Vicián, 2020
- Niveria liltvedi (Gofas, 1984)
- Niveria macaeica (Fehse & Grego, 2005)
- Niveria maltbiana (Schwengel & McGinty, 1942)
- Niveria maugeriae (Sowerby II, 1832)
- † Niveria miocarinata Fehse & Vicián, 2020
- Niveria nix (Schilder, 1922)
- † Niveria novosperara Fehse, 2021
- Niveria pacifica (Sowerby II, 1832)
- † Niveria peyreirensis (Cossmann & Peyrot, 1922)
- † Niveria pseudoavellana (Sacco, 1894)
- Niveria pullata (G. B. Sowerby II, 1870)
- Niveria quadripunctata (Gray, 1827)
- Niveria simonei Fehse, 2016
- Niveria suffusa (Gray, 1827)
- Niveria werneri Fehse, 1999
- Niveria xishaensis Ma, 1997

Species brought into synonymy

- Niveria aquatanica Cate, 1979: synonym of Niveria nix (Schilder, 1922)
- Niveria campus (Cate, 1979): synonym of Pseudopusula campus (C. N. Cate, 1979)
- Niveria carabus (Cate, 1979): synonym of Pseudopusula sanguinea (J. E. Gray in G. B. Sowerby I, 1832)
- Niveria cherobia (Cate, 1979): synonym of Pseudopusula rubescens (J. E. Gray, 1833)
- Niveria circumdata (Schilder, 1931): synonym of Pseudopusula circumdata (F. A. Schilder, 1931)
- Niveria colettae Fehse, 1999: synonym of Cleotrivia coletteae (Fehse, 1999)
- Niveria corallina Cate, 1979 : synonym of Cleotrivia corallina (Cate, 1979)
- † Niveria dalli Petuch, 1994: synonym of † Pusula dalli (Petuch, 1994)
- Niveria dorsennus Cate, 1979: synonym of Dolichupis dorsennus (Cate, 1979)
- Niveria fusca (Sowerby II, 1832): synonym of Pseudopusula fusca (Gray in G. B. Sowerby I, 1832)
- Niveria galapagensis (Melvill, 1900): synonym of Pseudopusula galapagensis (Melvill, 1900)
- Niveria grohorum Fehse & Grego, 2008: synonym of Trivia grohorum (Fehse & Grego, 2008)
- † Niveria incomparabilis Fehse, 2013: synonym of † Pseudopusula incomparabilis (Fehse, 2013) (original combination)
- † Niveria jozefgregoi Fehse, 2011: synonym of † Pseudopusula jozefgregoi (Fehse, 2011) (original combination)
- Niveria meridionalis Cate, 1979: synonym of Dolichupis meridionalis (Cate, 1979)
- † Niveria permagna (Johnson, 1910): synonym of † Pusula permagna (Johnson, 1910)
- Niveria problematica (Schilder, 1931): synonym of Pseudopusula problematica (F. A. Schilder, 1931)
- Niveria rubescens (Gray, 1833): synonym of Pseudopusula rubescens (J. E. Gray, 1833)
- Niveria sanguinea (Sowerby I, 1832): synonym of Pseudopusula sanguinea (Sowerby I, 1832)
- Niveria spongicola (Monterosato, 1923): synonym of Trivia spongicola Monterosato, 1923
