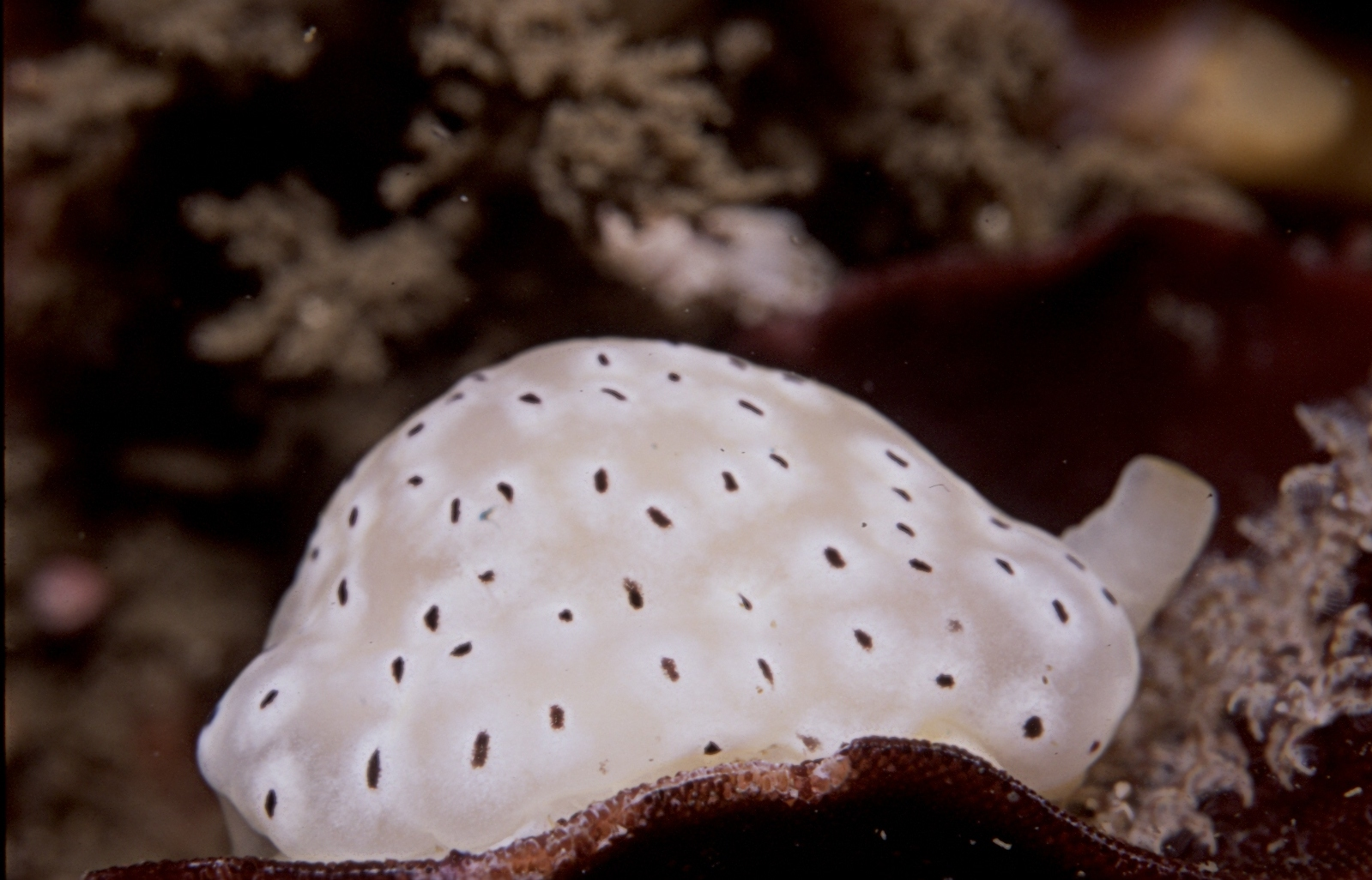
- Triviella ovulata

Scientific classification
- Kingdom: Animalia
- Phylum: Mollusca
- Class: Gastropoda
- Subclass: Caenogastropoda
- Order: Littorinimorpha
- Family: Triviidae
- Genus: Triviella; Jousseaume, 1884

Type species
- Cypraea oniscus Lamarck, 1811

Synonyms
- Galeatrivia Cate, 1979; Trivia (Triviella) Jousseaume, 1884

= Triviella =

Genus of gastropods

Triviella, common name the smooth pearl cowries, is a genus of small sea snails, marine gastropod molluscs in the family Triviidae, the trivias.

== Characteristics ==
The genus *Triviella* (formerly considered a subgenus of *Trivia*) includes several species that are highly similar and often require microscopic examination of the live animal for accurate species-level identification. The shells of smooth pearl cowrie species are inflated and globular, with a thickened labrum (outer lip of the aperture) that features well-developed denticles. These denticles often extend as transverse ridges around the outer lip, occasionally reaching the lower lateral part of the dorsum. Additionally, the inner lip of the aperture is also denticulate.

== Species ==
Species within the genus Triviella include:

- Triviella amaryllis Schilder, 1925
- Triviella aperta (Swainson, 1822)
- Triviella bogeni Beals & Lorenz, 2025
- Triviella calvariola (Kilburn, 1980)
- Triviella carptima Fehse, 2016
- Triviella chiapponii Fehse, 2016
- Triviella costata (Gmelin, 1791)
- Triviella debruini (Lorenz, 1994)
- Triviella eratoides (Liltved, 1986)
- Triviella franziskae Fehse & Massier, 2000
- Triviella goslineri (Liltved & Millard, 1994)
- Triviella immelmani Rosenberg & Finley, 2001
- Triviella insolita Fehse & Grego, 2007
- Triviella khanya (Liltved, 1986)
- Triviella lemaitrei (Liltved, 1986)
- Triviella lorenzi Fehse, 2016
- Triviella lowtheri Beals, 2008
- Triviella magnidentata (Liltved, 1986)
- Triviella martybealsi Fehse, 2016
- Triviella massieri (Martin & Poppe, 1991)
- Triviella millardi (C. N. Cate, 1979)
- Triviella montorum Fehse, 2016
- Triviella multicostata (Liltved, 1986)
- Triviella neglecta Schilder, 1930
- Triviella ovulata (Lamarck, 1811)
- Triviella phalacra Schilder, 1930
- † Triviella pompholugota (Tate, 1890)
- Triviella pseudovulata Schilder & M. Schilder, 1929
- Triviella rubra (Shaw, 1909)
- Triviella sanctispiritus (Shikama, 1974)
- Triviella sharonae (Hayes, 1993)
- Triviella splendidissima Tomlin, Schilder & M. Schilder, 1934
- Triviella verhoefi (Gosliner & Liltved, 1981)
- Triviella vesicularis (Gaskoin, 1836)
- Triviella williami Fehse, 2006

Species brought into synonymy

- Triviella gamma Mestayer, 1927: synonym of Pusula pediculus (Linnaeus, 1758)
- Triviella maoriensis Mestayer, 1927: synonym of Ellatrivia merces (Iredale, 1924)
- Triviella memorata Finlay, 1926: synonym of Ellatrivia merces (Iredale, 1924)
- Triviella merces Iredale, 1924: synonym of Ellatrivia merces (Iredale, 1924)
- Triviella porcellio Cate, 1979: synonym of Triviella neglecta Schilder, 1930
- Triviella virginiae (Liltved, 1986): synonym of Triviella vesicularis (Gaskoin, 1836)
