= Niveria brasilica =

Scientific classification
- Kingdom: Animalia
- Phylum: Mollusca
- Class: Gastropoda
- Subclass: Caenogastropoda
- Order: Littorinimorpha
- Family: Triviidae
- Genus: Niveria
- Species: N. brasilica

Binomial name
- Niveria brasilica Fehse & Grego, 2005

Species of gastropod

Niveria brasilica is a species of small sea snail, a marine gastropod mollusk in the family Triviidae, the false cowries or trivias.

== Description ==
The maximum recorded shell length is 5.9 mm.

== Habitat ==
Minimum recorded depth is 33 m. Maximum recorded depth is 33 m.
