= Triviella lowtheri =

Scientific classification
- Kingdom: Animalia
- Phylum: Mollusca
- Class: Gastropoda
- Subclass: Caenogastropoda
- Order: Littorinimorpha
- Family: Triviidae
- Genus: Triviella
- Species: T. lowtheri

Binomial name
- Triviella lowtheri Beals, 2008

Species of gastropod

Triviella lowtheri is a species of small sea snail, a marine gastropod mollusc in the family Triviidae, the false cowries or trivias.
