= Trivia multilirata =

Scientific classification
- Kingdom: Animalia
- Phylum: Mollusca
- Class: Gastropoda
- Subclass: Caenogastropoda
- Order: Littorinimorpha
- Family: Triviidae
- Genus: Trivia
- Species: T. multilirata

Binomial name
- Trivia multilirata Sowerby II, 1870

Species of gastropod

Trivia multilirata is a species of small sea snail, a marine gastropod mollusc in the family Triviidae, the false cowries or trivias.
