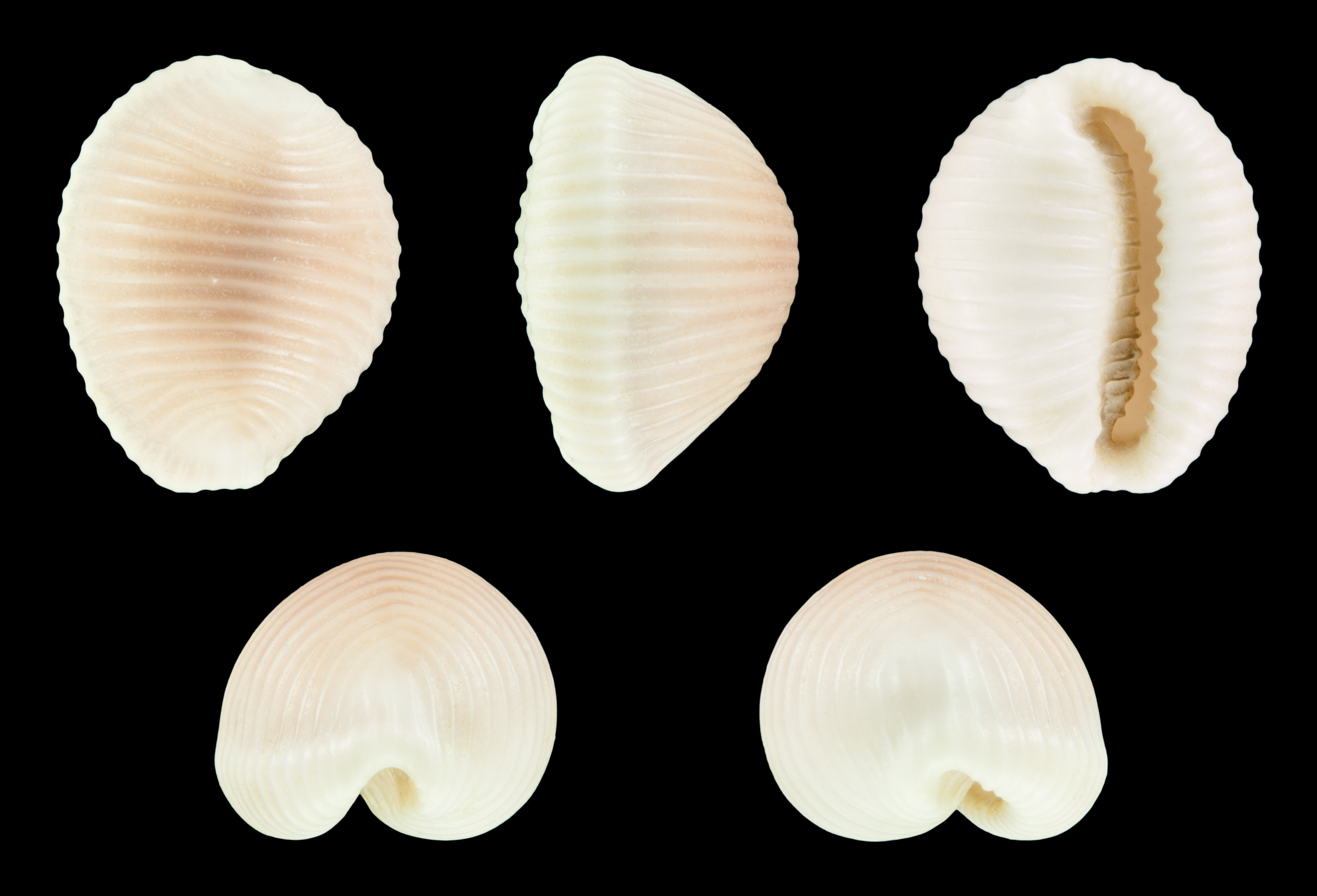

Scientific classification
- Kingdom: Animalia
- Phylum: Mollusca
- Class: Gastropoda
- Subclass: Caenogastropoda
- Order: Littorinimorpha
- Family: Triviidae
- Genus: Trivia
- Species: T. arctica

Binomial name
- Trivia arctica (Pulteney, 1799)

Synonyms
- Trivia mollerati (Locard, 1894)

= Trivia arctica =

Species of gastropod

Trivia arctica, the northern cowrie, is a species of small sea snail, a marine gastropod mollusc in the family Triviidae, the trivias. This is a similar species to Trivia monacha and it often occurs in the same areas. The name Trivia means "common" and the word arctica means "of the arctic".

== Distribution ==
This species occurs from the Mediterranean Sea to the Orkney north of Scotland and Norway. It is more common in the north.

In the British Isles the shells are known as "cowries", except in Caithness, Orkney and Shetland where they are called Groatie Buckies. In these areas, the shells are traditionally seen as lucky and can be found in art and jewellery. In the Isles of Scilly the shell is referred to as a Guinea Money.

== Habitat ==
This species usually lives below low tide, in other words is sublittoral, but the empty shells of this species are often washed up onto beaches. In its northern range is found at depths of 100 m and in it southern range at depths up to 1000 m.

== Description ==
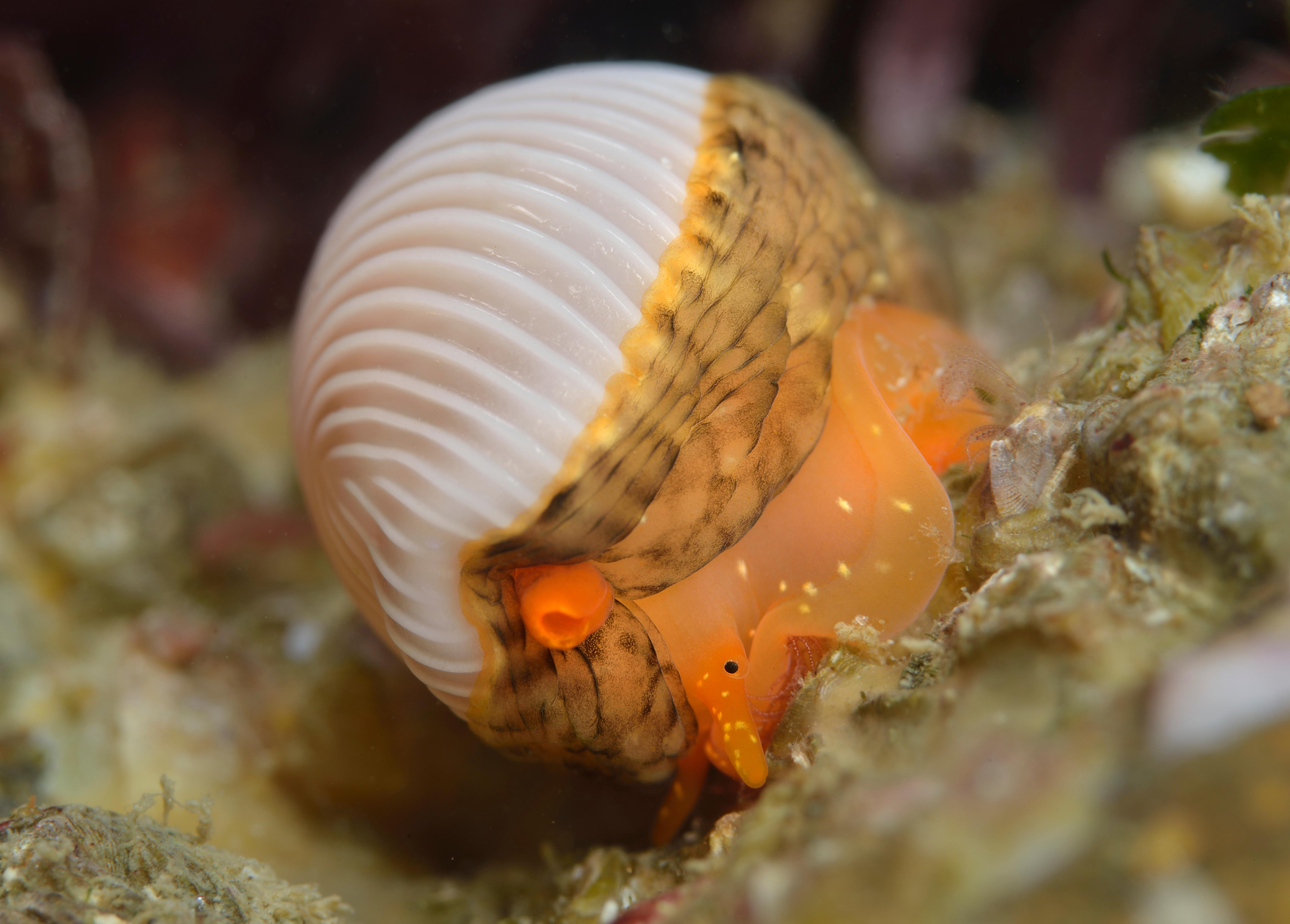

The shell is glossy and lemon-shaped, with 20-30 transverse ridges. The upper part of the shell is a uniform very pale brown in color; there are no pigment spots present on the shell, but sometimes there are dots on the mantle of the animal.

The shell length is up to a maximum of about 10 mm and a width of about 8 mm.

The mantle is covered with many papillae. It has a light colour in deeper waters, but becomes darker, often red, between tide marks. The foot is light yellow or light orange. The admedian teeth of the radula have denticles. The penis is flat and broad.

The larvae have a light stomach and intestine. In the veliger stage they have a four-lobed velum (a structure used for swimming and particulate food collection) with very long lobes.

== Life habits ==
This snail lives among and feeds on compound ascidians, including Botryllus schlosseri. They often occur together with Trivia monacha. The breeding season is autumn, winter and early spring.

T. arctica is one of several Cypraeoides that secretes acid when disturbed. It has been suggested that the bright colour of the mantle is intended to warn of this defence.

== Note on differentiating the species ==
Both Trivia arctica and Trivia monacha were considered to be two forms of the same species until 1925, when Alfred James Peile published a paper in the Proceedings of the Malacological Society differentiating the two. It is now known that the larvae of the two species are readily distinguishable.

The Linnaean name Trivia europea, now lapsed, referred to the supposed single species. Linnaeus himself mentioned two kinds: Cypraea europea and Cypraea anglica, but these terms were intended as a geographical distinction, and are not accepted as species names today.

== Use as ornaments during the Stone age ==
Large amount of trivia shell ornaments consisting of Trivia arctica and Trivia monacha have been excavated in Stone Age burials at Téviec in northwestern France, dating back to c. 5000–7000 BC. They are some of the earliest European examples of false cowrie shells used in necklaces and ornaments, for the most part associated with male skeletons. While the Trivia genus superficially resembles the true ribbed cowries from the tropics, the two species are not closely related. However, these shells are sometimes called cowries in the British Isles, but are more widely known as false cowries.

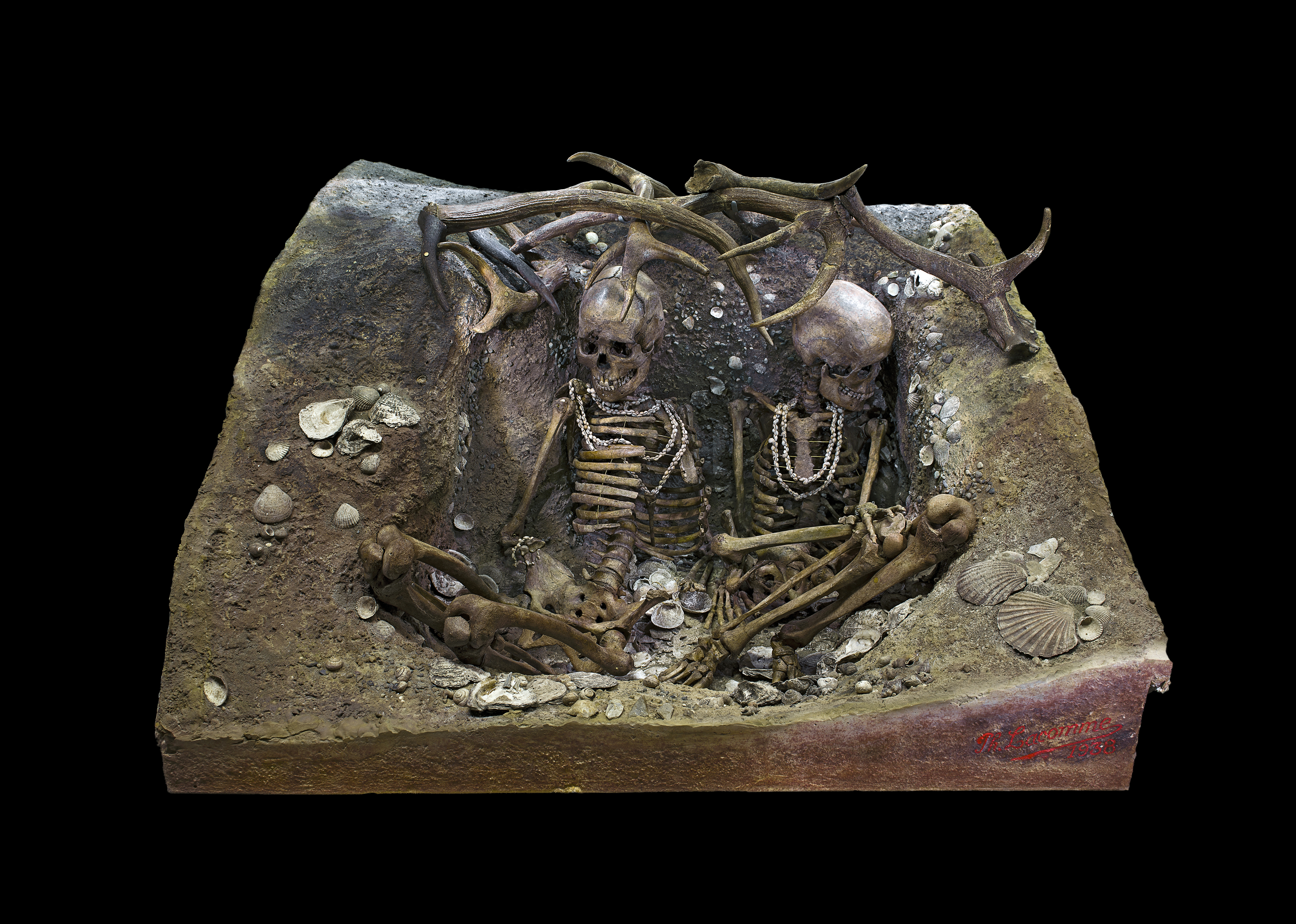
Note the existence of a single Monetaria annulus specimen to the left of the skull

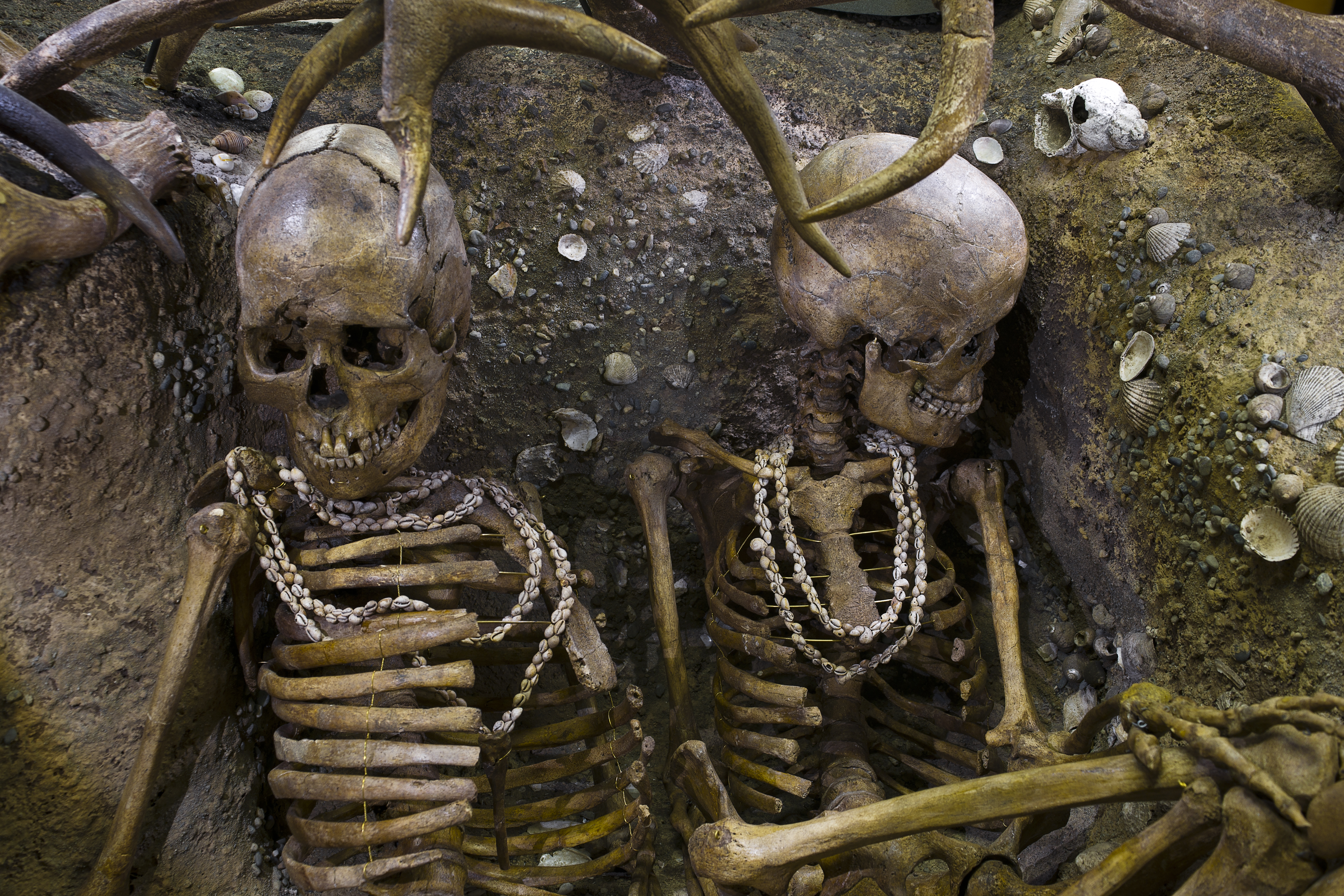
Skeletons with trivia ornaments

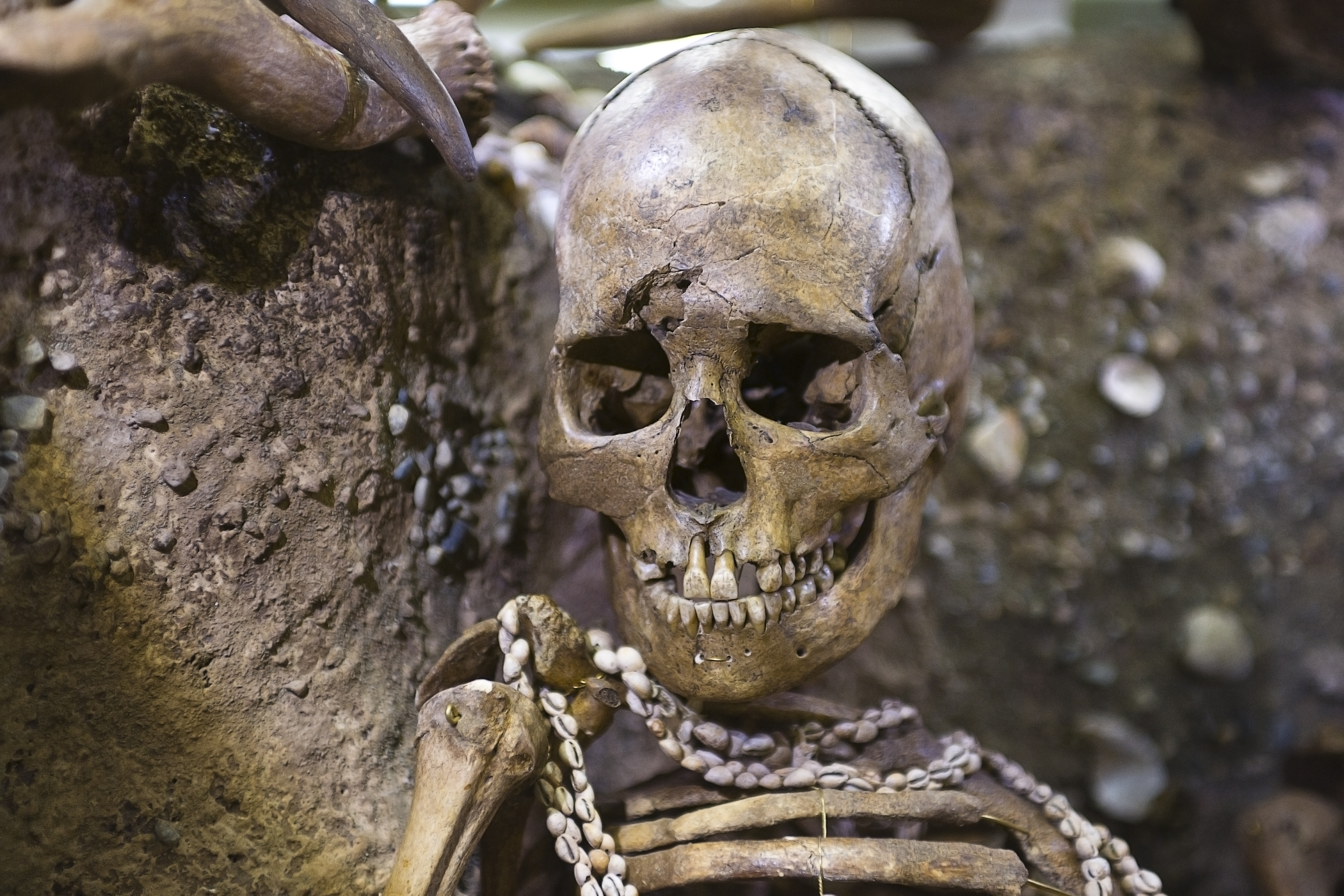
Skeletons with trivia ornament
