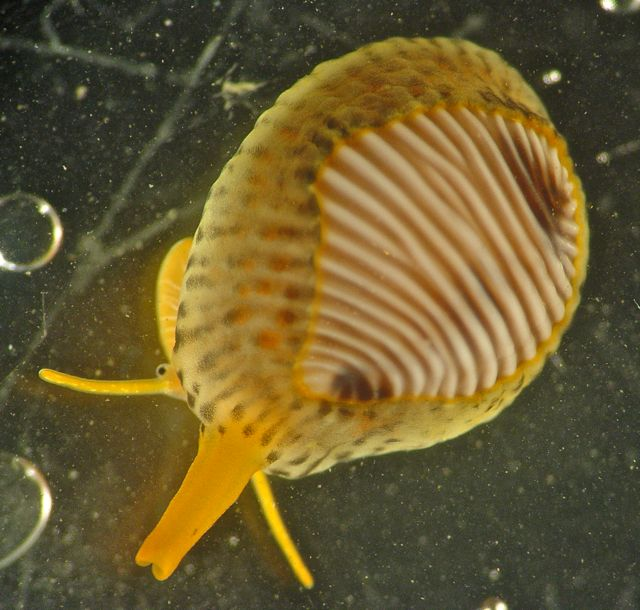
- Live spotted cowrie in a petri dish

Scientific classification
- Kingdom: Animalia
- Phylum: Mollusca
- Class: Gastropoda
- Subclass: Caenogastropoda
- Order: Littorinimorpha
- Family: Triviidae
- Genus: Trivia
- Species: T. monacha

Binomial name
- Trivia monacha (da Costa, 1778)

= Trivia monacha =

Species of gastropod

Trivia monacha, also known as the European cowrie or spotted cowrie, is a species of small sea snail, a marine gastropod mollusc in the family Triviidae, the trivias.

The name Trivia means "common" and the word monacha means "solitary".

It is worth comparing this species with the similar species Trivia arctica, the northern cowrie.

== Shell description ==
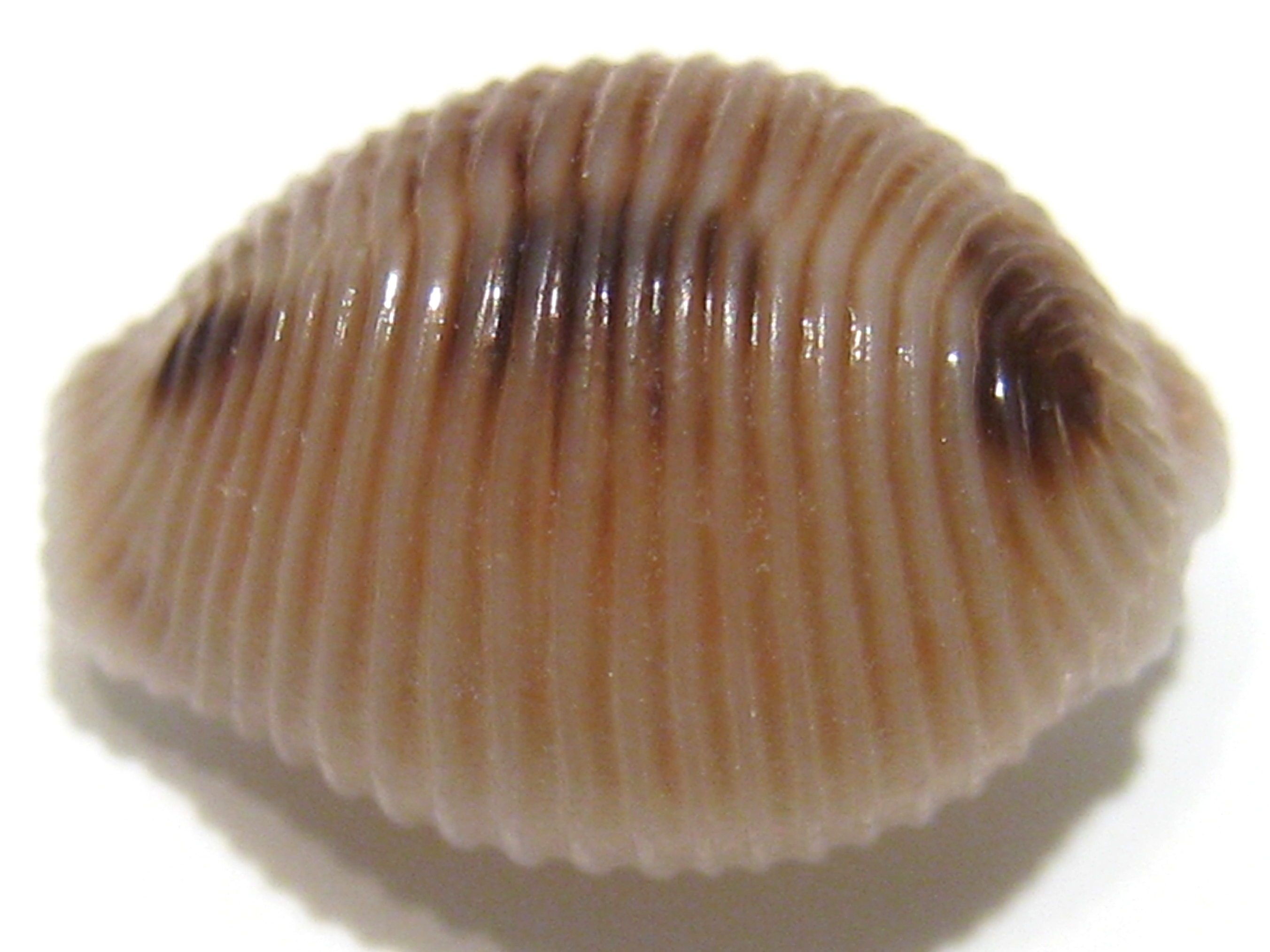
Lateral view of a shell of Trivia monacha

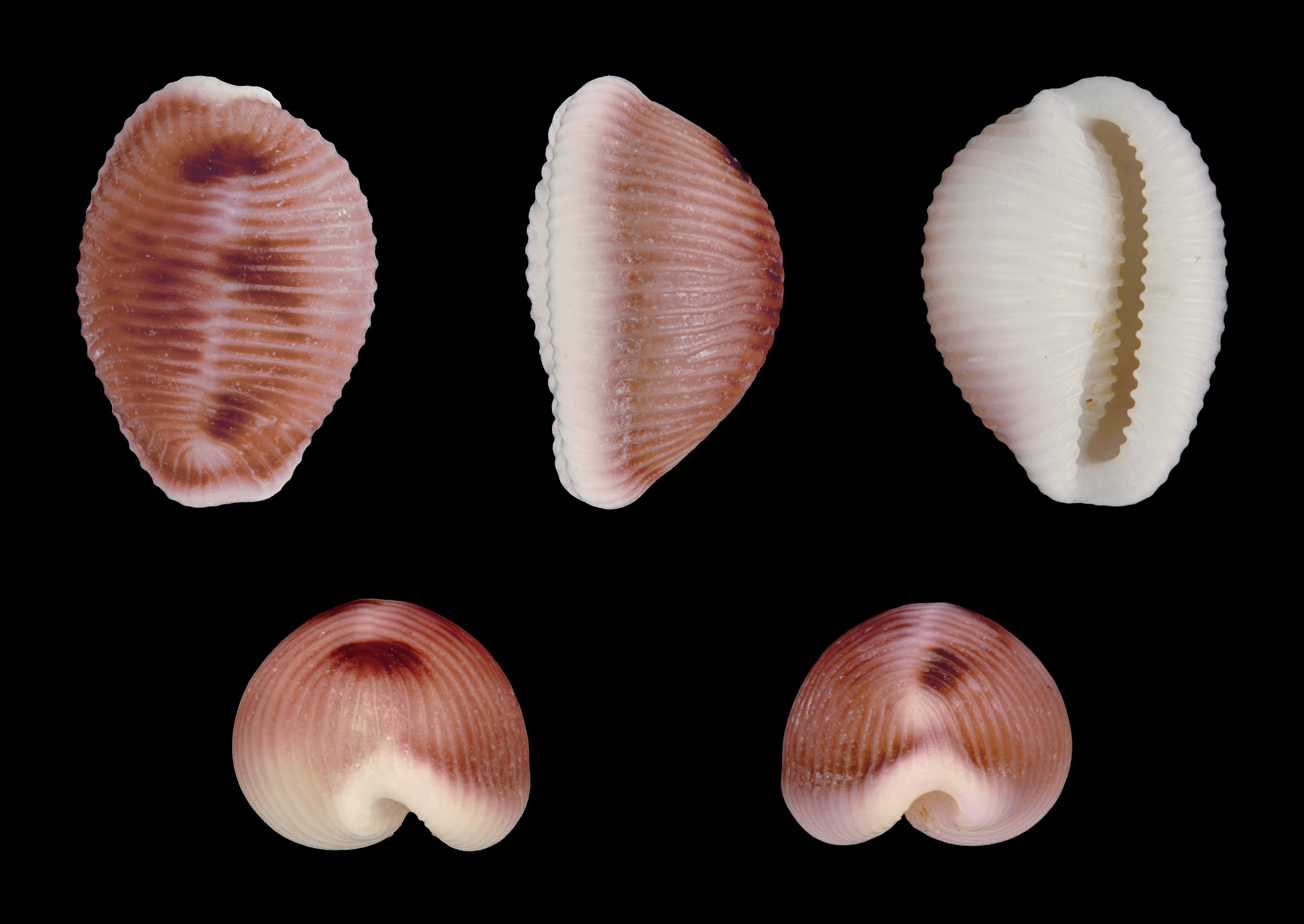
Five views of a shell of Trivia monacha

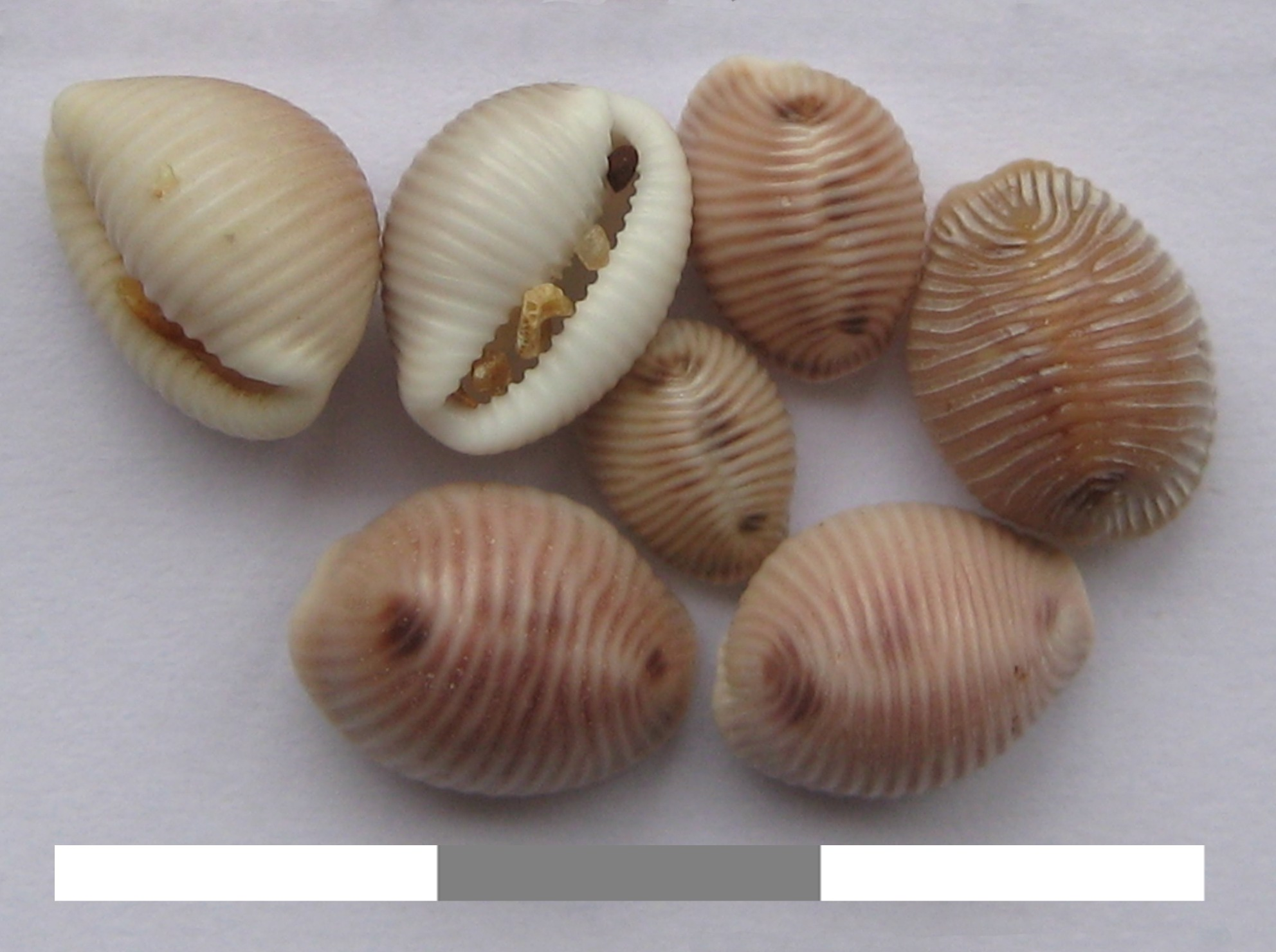
Adult Trivia monacha shells hand-picked from beachdrift, from near Aberffraw, Anglesey. Scale is in cm.

The shell of this species is glossy, convolute and lemon-shaped, with 20-30 transverse ridges. The dorsal part of the shell is a pinkish or reddish-brown with three characteristic darker spots in mature individuals, one spot anterior, the other posterior and one in the centre, all situated along a central line. Juvenile shells are all white or light-coloured. The apertural side is white and flattened. The aperture is narrow and runs along the whole length of the shell. At the ends it turns to the left in the direction of the swollen body whorl. The transverse ridges are strong and often bifurcate. The ones at the ends are almost U-shaped.

The shell length is up to a maximum of about 15 mm and its width about 8 mm.

The dark mantle is covered by few papillae, usually tipped with pale yellow. The mantle is drawn out into a long siphon anteriorly, extending over the whole (or almost the whole) shell. The foot is orange or bright yellow.

The breeding season is late spring or summer. The larvae have a very dark stomach and intestine. More developed larvae in the veliger stage have a two-lobed velum (a structure used for swimming and particulate food collection) that is slightly indented at sides. The larvae reach the adult form in about five to six months.

== Distribution ==
This species occurs from the Mediterranean Sea to the Shetland archipelago in the north of Scotland, but is more common in the south.

In Orkney and some parts of Scotland, the species are known as 'groatie buckies' and are popular with local collectors.

== Habitat ==
This species usually lives on rocky shores or under stones below low tide, in other words is sublittoral, but the empty shells of this species are often washed up onto beaches. It is usually found together with compound ascidians (Botrylus, Botrylloides and Diplosoma). Trivia monacha lacks small denticles on the admedian teeth of the radula. Furthermore, the rows of teeth in the two species are different.

== Life habits ==
This snail feeds on sea squirts and compound ascidians. It is one of several Cypraeoides that secrete acid when disturbed. It has been suggested that the bright colour of the mantel is intended to warn of this defence.

== Similar species ==
Trivia monacha is sometimes confused with Trivia arctica. In fact they were considered to be two forms of the same species until 1925, when Alfred James Peile published a paper in the Proceedings of the Malacological Society differentiating the two. They can be differentiated by the radula, the shape of the penis and their larval stages. In Trivia monacha the penis is filiform and cylindrical, while in Trivia arctica the penis is large and flat.

It is now known that the larvae of the two species are readily distinguishable.

The Linnaean name Trivia europea, now lapsed, referred to the supposed single species. Linnaeus himself mentioned two kinds: Cypraea europea and Cypraea anglica, but these terms were intended as a geographical distinction and are not accepted as species names today.
