= Trivia levantina =

Scientific classification
- Kingdom: Animalia
- Phylum: Mollusca
- Class: Gastropoda
- Subclass: Caenogastropoda
- Order: Littorinimorpha
- Family: Triviidae
- Genus: Trivia
- Species: T. levantina

Binomial name
- Trivia levantina (Smriglio, Mariottini & Buzzurro, 1998)

Species of gastropod

Trivia levantina is a species of small sea snail, a marine gastropod mollusc in the family Triviidae, the false cowries or trivias.
