= Triviella williami =

Scientific classification
- Kingdom: Animalia
- Phylum: Mollusca
- Class: Gastropoda
- Subclass: Caenogastropoda
- Order: Littorinimorpha
- Family: Triviidae
- Genus: Triviella
- Species: T. williami

Binomial name
- Triviella williami Fehse, 2006

Species of gastropod

Triviella williami is a species of small sea snail, a marine gastropod mollusc in the family Triviidae, the false cowries or trivias.
