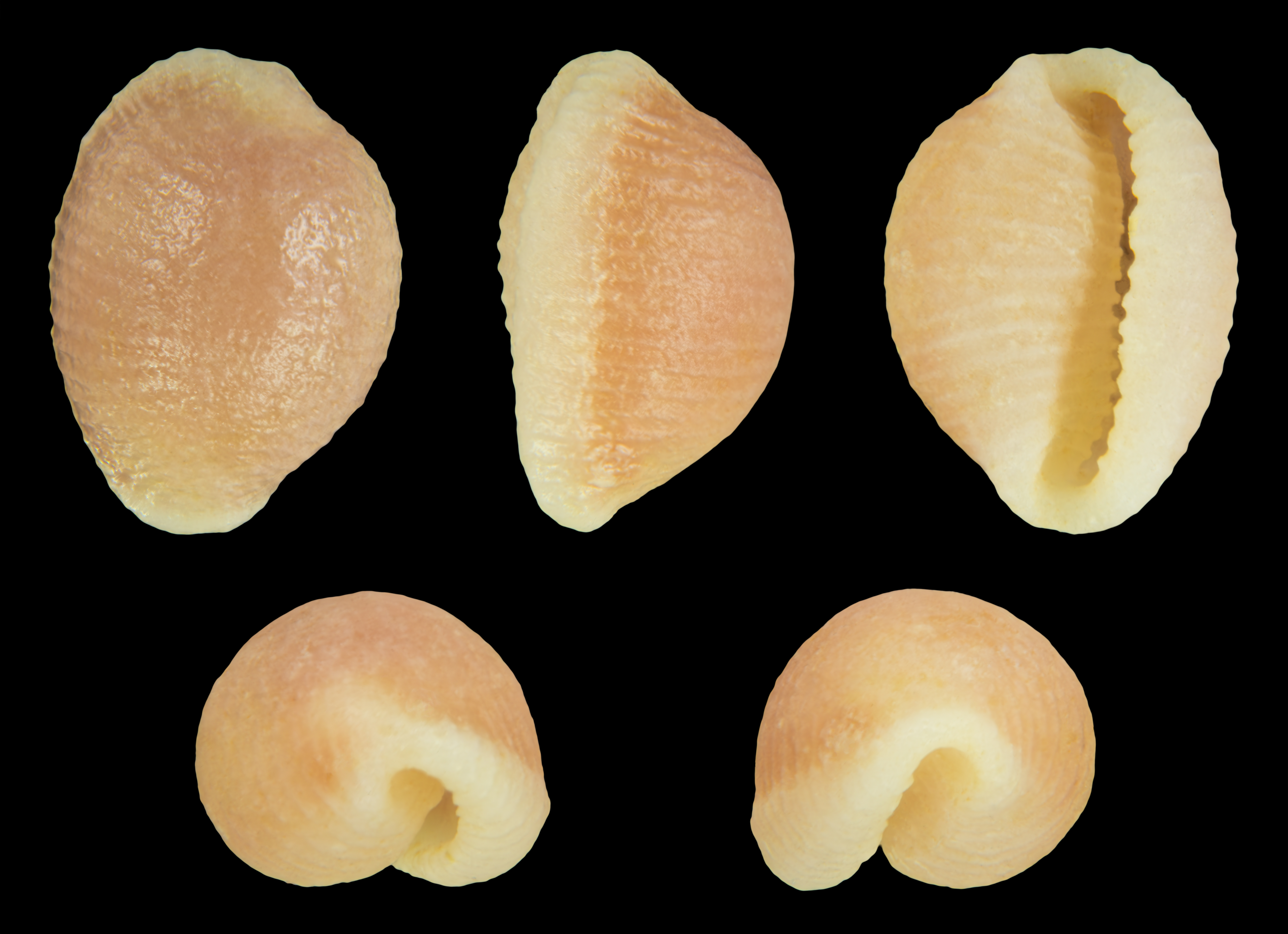

Scientific classification
- Kingdom: Animalia
- Phylum: Mollusca
- Class: Gastropoda
- Subclass: Caenogastropoda
- Order: Littorinimorpha
- Family: Triviidae
- Genus: Trivia
- Species: T. mediterranea

Binomial name
- Trivia mediterranea (Risso, 1826)

Synonyms
- Trivia pulex (Gray, 1827)

= Trivia mediterranea =

Species of mollusc

Trivia mediterranea is a species of small sea snail, a marine gastropod mollusc in the family Triviidae, the false cowries or trivias.
