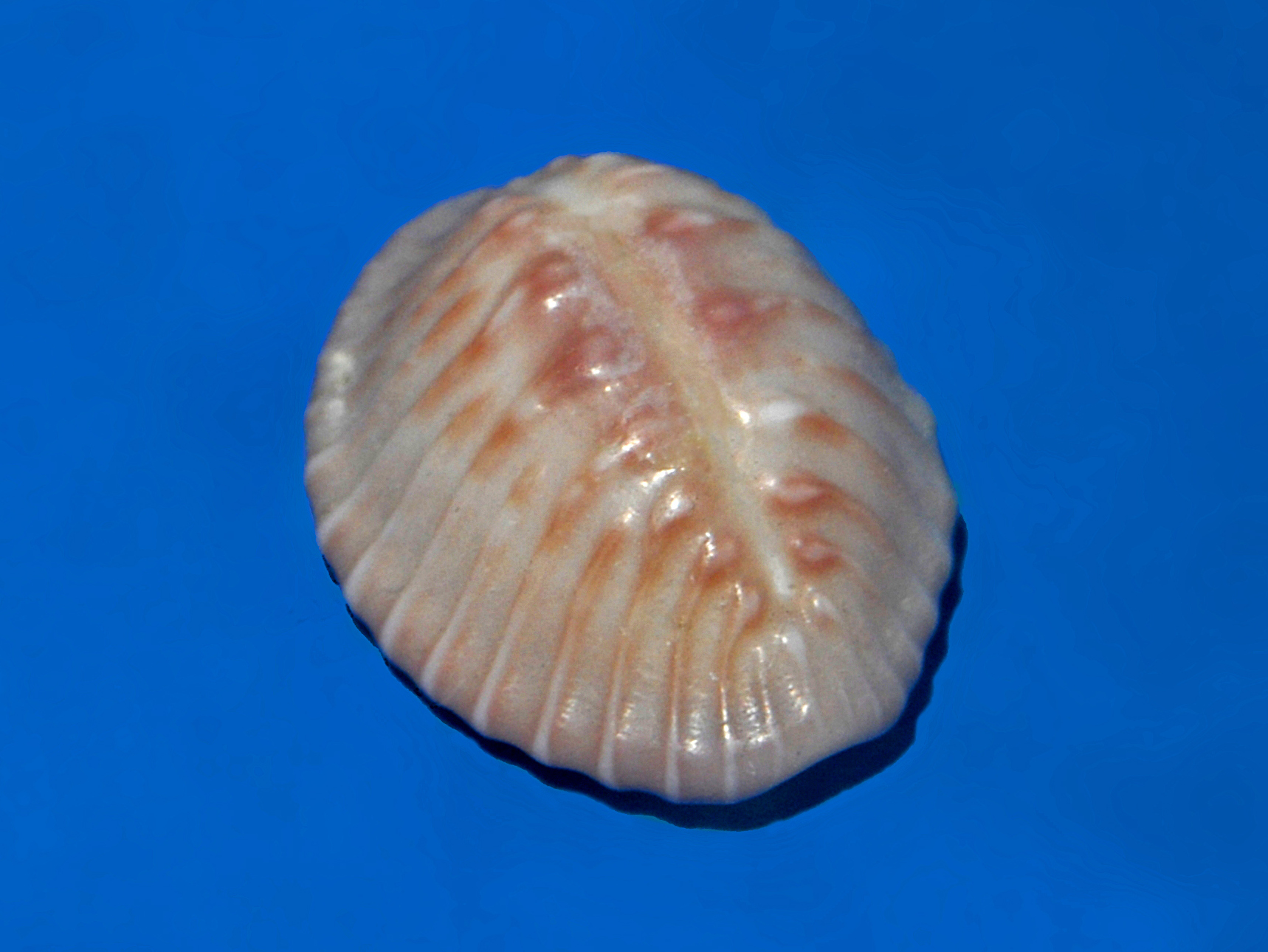
- A shell of Pusula radians from Nicaragua on display at the Museo Civico di Storia Naturale di Milano

Scientific classification
- Kingdom: Animalia
- Phylum: Mollusca
- Class: Gastropoda
- Subclass: Caenogastropoda
- Order: Littorinimorpha
- Family: Triviidae
- Genus: Pusula
- Species: P. radians

Binomial name
- Pusula radians Lamarck, 1810

Synonyms
- Trivia radians Lamarck, 1810; Cypraea rota Weinkauff 1881; Trivia sanguinea circumdata Schlinder 1881

= Pusula radians =

Species of gastropod

Pusula radians, the "radiant button shell"or "radiating trivia", is a species of small sea snail, a marine gastropod mollusk in the family Triviidae, the false cowries or trivias.

== Description ==
The shell of an adult Pusula radians can be as long as 21 millimetres (0.83 in), with a diameter of about 15 millimetres (0.59 in). The shell is ovate and pinkish. It has small pale brown spots and wart-like tubercles on the dorsum, and strong transverse ribs on the base. As is the case is all the members of this family, the aperture runs the length of the shell and has teeth along the margins.

== Distribution ==
This species is widespread along the coast of Mexico including the Baja California peninsula, Ecuador, Nicaragua and Peru. It lives under rocks below the intertidal zone in coastal waters.
