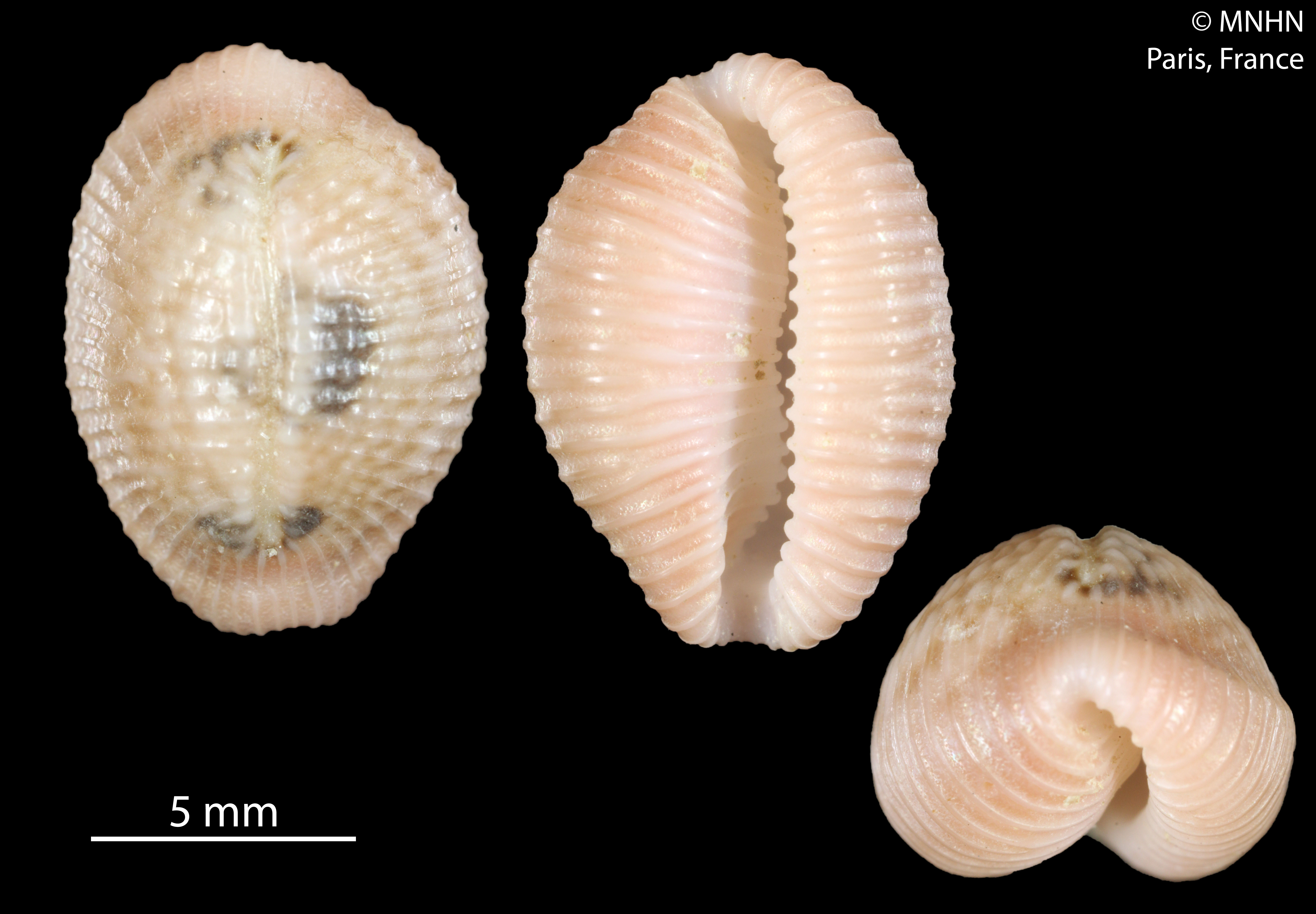
- Shell of Niveria harriettae (paratype at MNHN, Paris)

Scientific classification
- Kingdom: Animalia
- Phylum: Mollusca
- Class: Gastropoda
- Subclass: Caenogastropoda
- Order: Littorinimorpha
- Family: Triviidae
- Genus: Niveria
- Species: N. harriettae

Binomial name
- Niveria harriettae Fehse & Grego, 2010

= Niveria harriettae =

Species of gastropod

Niveria harriettae is a species of small sea snail, a marine gastropod mollusc in the family Triviidae, the false cowries or trivias.

This species was described by Dirk Fehse and Jozef Grego in 2010, and is known from the Gulf of Mexico and the Caribbean Sea.
