= Triviella khanya =

Scientific classification
- Kingdom: Animalia
- Phylum: Mollusca
- Class: Gastropoda
- Subclass: Caenogastropoda
- Order: Littorinimorpha
- Family: Triviidae
- Genus: Triviella
- Species: T. khanya

Binomial name
- Triviella khanya (Liltved, 1986)

Synonyms
- Trivia khanya Liltved, 1986 (basionym); Triviella immelmani Rosenberg & Finley, 2001

Species of gastropod

Triviella khanya is a species of small sea snail, a marine gastropod mollusc in the family Triviidae, the false cowries or trivias.
