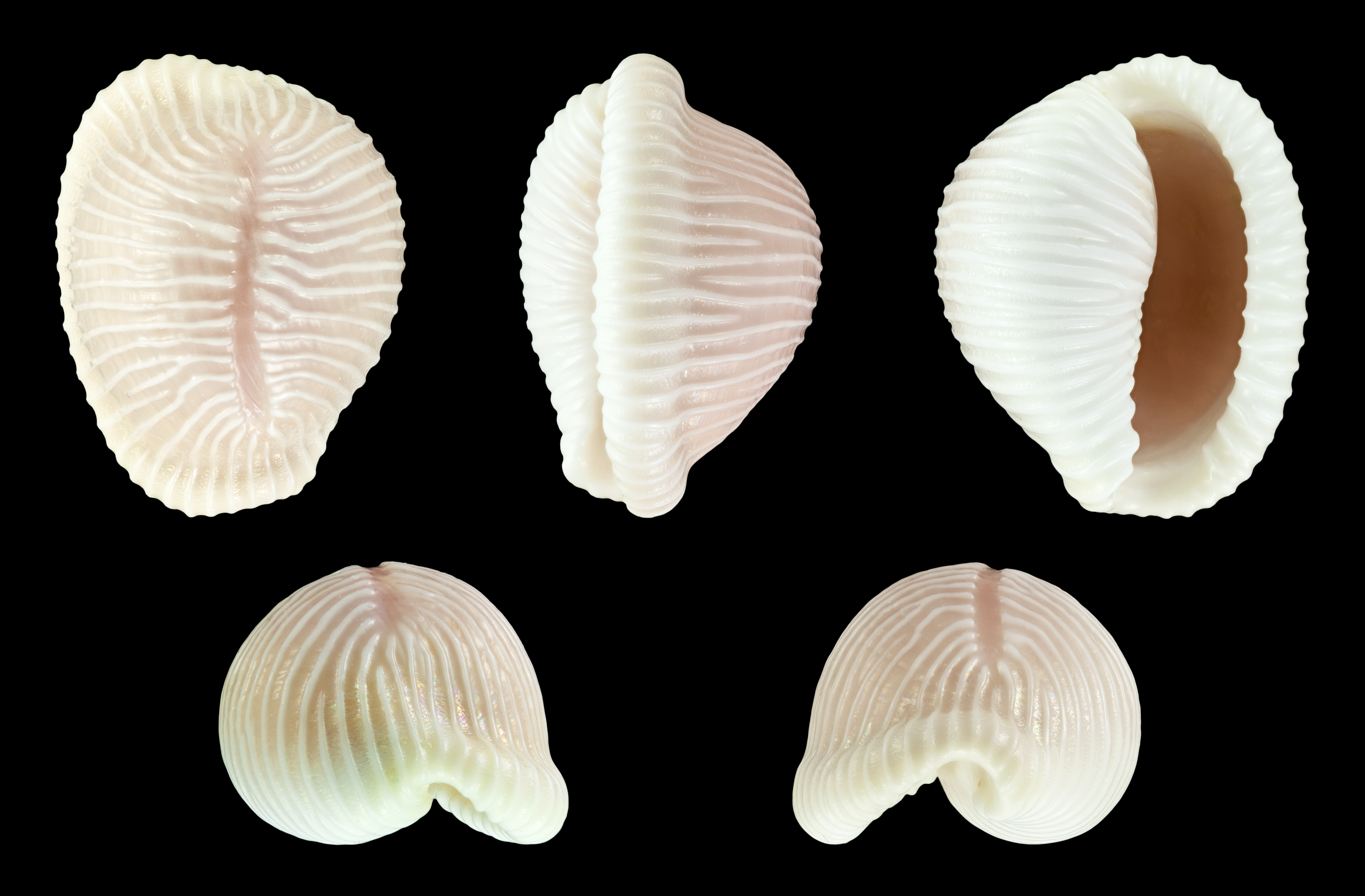

Scientific classification
- Kingdom: Animalia
- Phylum: Mollusca
- Class: Gastropoda
- Subclass: Caenogastropoda
- Order: Littorinimorpha
- Family: Triviidae
- Genus: Triviella
- Species: T. aperta

Binomial name
- Triviella aperta (Swainson, 1822)

Synonyms
- Cypraea aperta Swainson, 1822 (basionym); Cypraea carnea Gray, 1828; Cypraea oniscus Lamarck, 1810 (non Röding, 1798); Cypraea rosea W. Wood, 1828; Trivia aperta (Swainson, 1822); Triviella carnea (Gray, 1828); Triviella porcellio Cate, 1979

= Triviella aperta =

Species of gastropod

Triviella aperta, commonly named the baby's toes, is a species of small sea snail, a marine gastropod mollusk in the family Triviidae, the false cowries or trivias.

== Distribution ==
This species occurs off the south coast of South Africa.
