= Triviella sanctispiritus =

Scientific classification
- Kingdom: Animalia
- Phylum: Mollusca
- Class: Gastropoda
- Subclass: Caenogastropoda
- Order: Littorinimorpha
- Family: Triviidae
- Genus: Triviella
- Species: T. sanctispiritus

Binomial name
- Triviella sanctispiritus (Shikama, 1974)

Synonyms
- Trivia sanctispiritus Shikama, 1974

Species of gastropod

Triviella sanctispiritus is a species of gastropod belonging to the family Triviidae.

The species inhabits marine environments.
