= Trivia grohorum =

Scientific classification
- Kingdom: Animalia
- Phylum: Mollusca
- Class: Gastropoda
- Subclass: Caenogastropoda
- Order: Littorinimorpha
- Family: Triviidae
- Genus: Trivia
- Species: T. grohorum

Binomial name
- Trivia grohorum (Fehse & Grego, 2008)

Synonyms
- Niveria grohorum Fehse & Grego, 2008

Species of gastropod

Trivia grohorum is a species of small sea snail, a marine gastropod mollusc in the family Triviidae, the false cowries or trivias.
