= Cleotrivia coletteae =

Scientific classification
- Kingdom: Animalia
- Phylum: Mollusca
- Class: Gastropoda
- Subclass: Caenogastropoda
- Order: Littorinimorpha
- Family: Triviidae
- Genus: Cleotrivia
- Species: C. coletteae

Binomial name
- Cleotrivia coletteae Fehse, 1999

Synonyms
- Niveria coletteae Fehse, 1999 (basionym)

Species of gastropod

Cleotrivia coletteae is a species of small sea snail, a marine gastropod mollusk in the family Triviidae, the false cowries or trivias.

== Description ==
The shell grows to a length of 3.8 mm.

== Distribution ==
This species is distributed in the Red Sea, the Persian Gulf, and in the Indian Ocean along Réunion.
