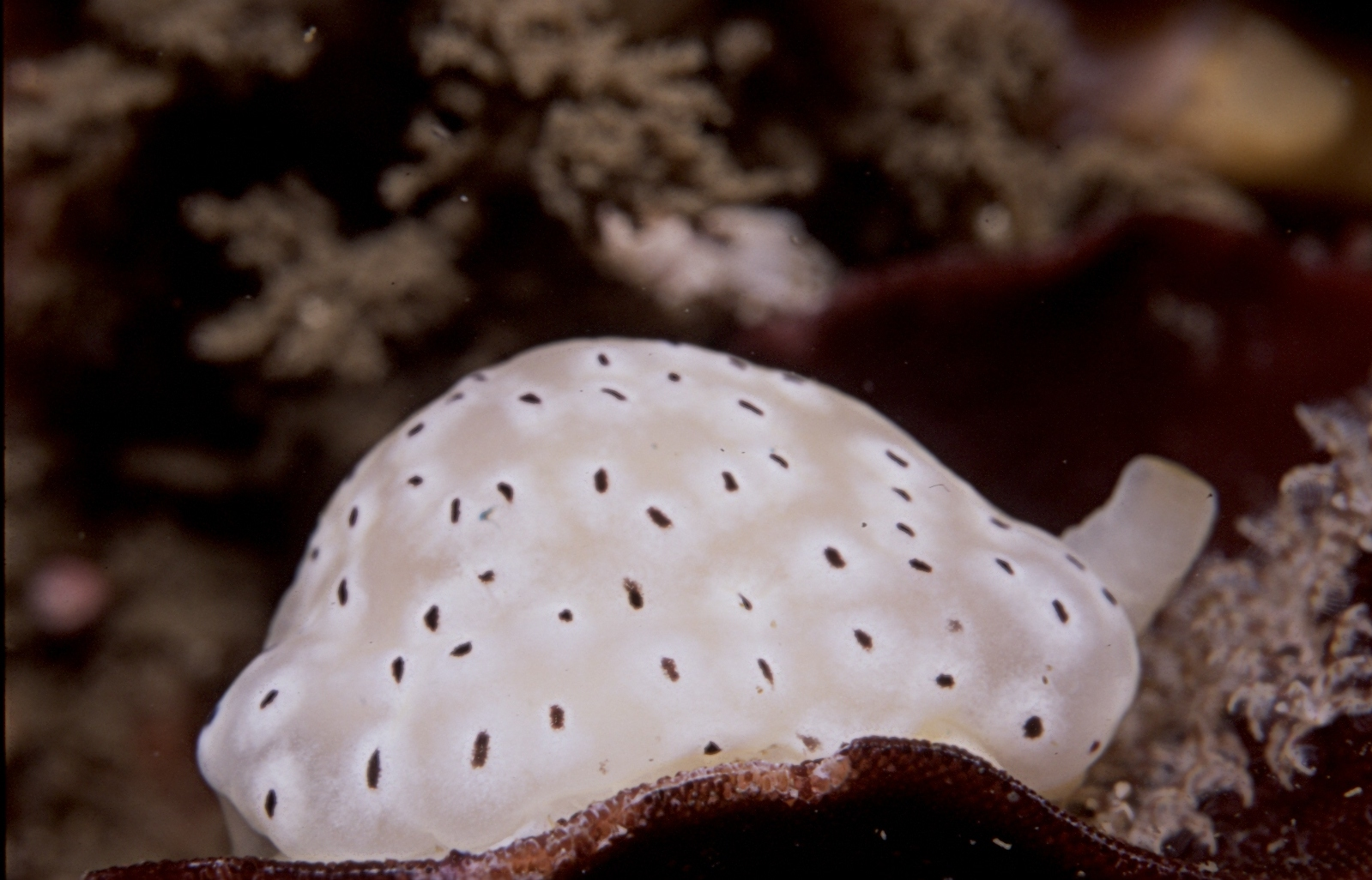
- A live individual of Triviella ovulata, head end towards the right

Scientific classification
- Kingdom: Animalia
- Phylum: Mollusca
- Class: Gastropoda
- Subclass: Caenogastropoda
- Order: Littorinimorpha
- Family: Triviidae
- Genus: Triviella
- Species: T. ovulata

Binomial name
- Triviella ovulata (Lamarck, 1810)

Synonyms
- Trivia ovulata (Lamarck, 1811)

= Triviella ovulata =

Species of gastropod

Triviella ovulata, common name baby's toes, is a species of small sea snail, a marine gastropod mollusc in the family Triviidae, the trivias.

== Distribution ==
This snail is known around the South African coast from the Cape Peninsula to Coffee Bay in depths of 8–30 m. This species is endemic to the area.

== Description ==
Triviella ovulata has a plump, round, white to deep pink shell. In life the shell is usually completely covered with the white mantle, which is variably spotted with black. It reaches a maximum size of 40 mm.

== Ecology ==
This snail is usually found among colonial ascidians, on which it feeds. The snail first drills a hole in the wall of the colony, then eats its fill and finally lays its capsule-shaped egg cases in the resulting cavity. The black-spotted form of this animal resembles Mandela's nudibranch, Mandelia mirocornata, which may cause fish predators to avoid it.
