= Niveria werneri =

Scientific classification
- Kingdom: Animalia
- Phylum: Mollusca
- Class: Gastropoda
- Subclass: Caenogastropoda
- Order: Littorinimorpha
- Family: Triviidae
- Genus: Niveria
- Species: N. werneri

Binomial name
- Niveria werneri Fehse, 1999

Species of gastropod

Niveria werneri is a species of small sea snail, a marine gastropod mollusk in the family Triviidae, the false cowries or trivias.
