= Pseudopusula californiana =

Scientific classification
- Kingdom: Animalia
- Phylum: Mollusca
- Class: Gastropoda
- Subclass: Caenogastropoda
- Order: Littorinimorpha
- Family: Triviidae
- Genus: Pseudopusula
- Species: P. californiana

Binomial name
- Pseudopusula californiana (Gray, 1827)

Species of gastropod

Pseudopusula californiana, common name the "coffee bean trivia", is a species of small sea snail, a marine gastropod mollusk in the family Triviidae, the trivias.
