= Triviella neglecta =

Scientific classification
- Kingdom: Animalia
- Phylum: Mollusca
- Class: Gastropoda
- Subclass: Caenogastropoda
- Order: Littorinimorpha
- Family: Triviidae
- Genus: Triviella
- Species: T. neglecta

Binomial name
- Triviella neglecta Schilder, 1930

Synonyms
- Trivia neglecta (Schilder, 1930)

Species of gastropod

Triviella neglecta is a species of gastropod belonging to the family Triviidae.

The species is found in Southern Africa and inhabits marine environments.
