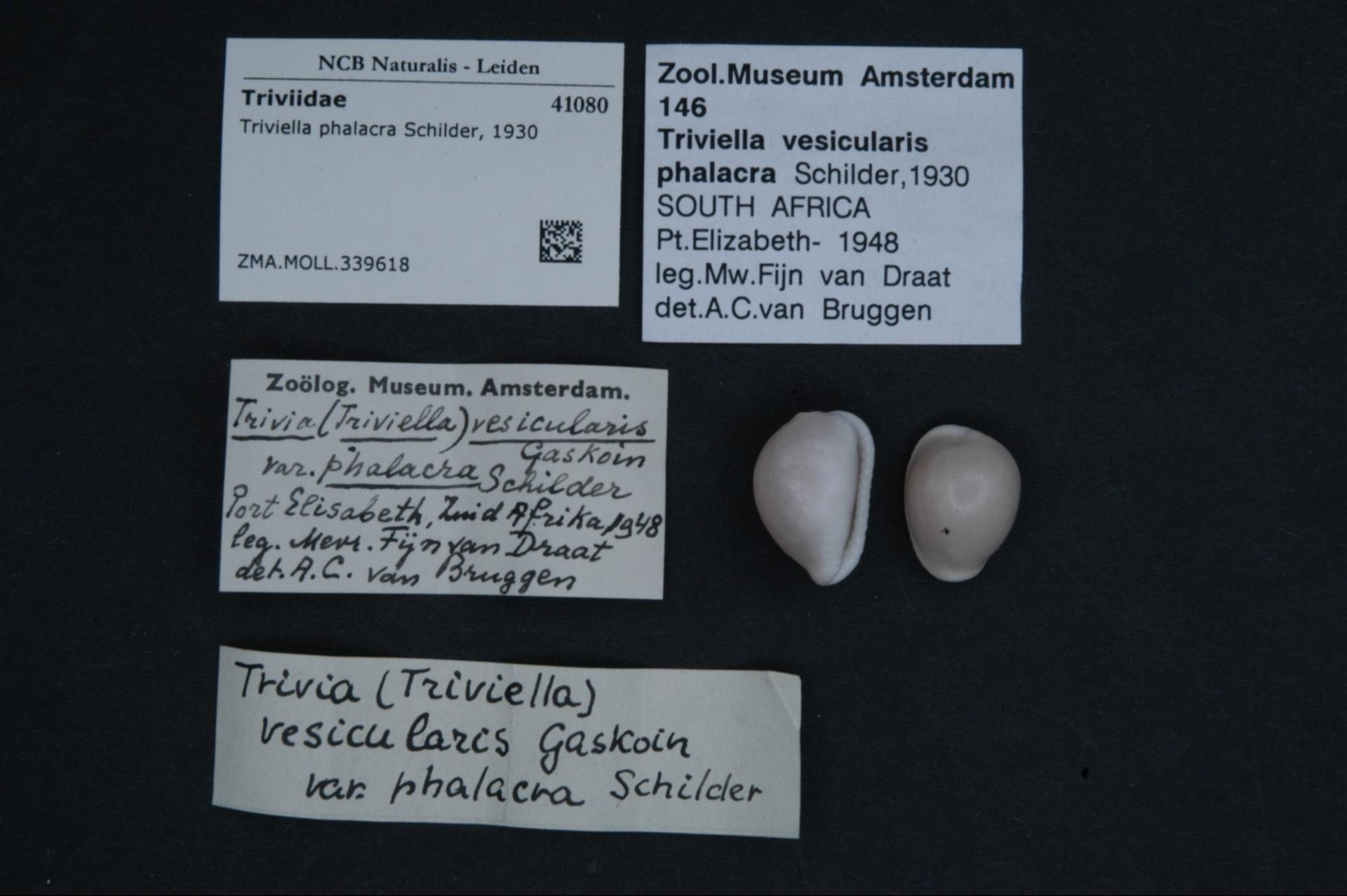

Scientific classification
- Kingdom: Animalia
- Phylum: Mollusca
- Class: Gastropoda
- Subclass: Caenogastropoda
- Order: Littorinimorpha
- Family: Triviidae
- Genus: Triviella
- Species: T. phalacra

Binomial name
- Triviella phalacra Schilder, 1930

Synonyms
- Trivia phalacra (Schilder, 1930)

= Triviella phalacra =

Species of gastropod

Triviella phalacra is a species of small sea snail, a marine gastropod mollusc in the family Triviidae, the false cowries or trivias.
