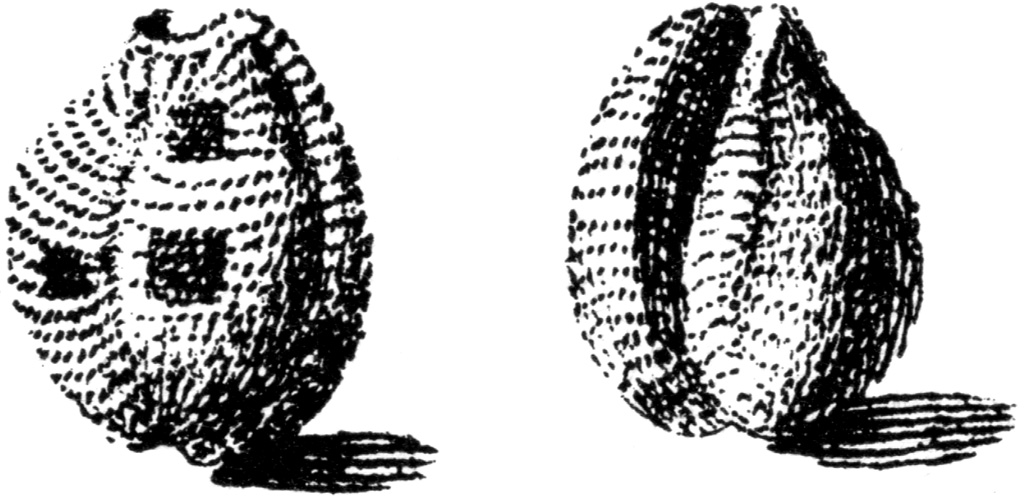
- Trivia quadripunctata Linnaeus, 1758

Scientific classification
- Kingdom: Animalia
- Phylum: Mollusca
- Class: Gastropoda
- Subclass: Caenogastropoda
- Order: Littorinimorpha
- Family: Triviidae
- Genus: Niveria
- Species: N. quadripunctata

Binomial name
- Niveria quadripunctata (Gray, 1827)

= Niveria quadripunctata =

Species of gastropod

Niveria quadripunctata is a species of small sea snail, a marine gastropod mollusk in the family Triviidae, the false cowries or trivias.

== Description ==
The maximum recorded shell length is 10 mm.

== Habitat ==
Minimum recorded depth is 0 m. Maximum recorded depth is 51 m.
