= Niveria macaeica =

Scientific classification
- Kingdom: Animalia
- Phylum: Mollusca
- Class: Gastropoda
- Subclass: Caenogastropoda
- Order: Littorinimorpha
- Family: Triviidae
- Genus: Niveria
- Species: N. macaeica

Binomial name
- Niveria macaeica (Fehse & Grego, 2005)

Synonyms
- Pusula macaeica Fehse & Grego, 2005 (original combination)

Species of gastropod

Niveria macaeica is a species of small sea snail, a marine gastropod mollusk in the family Triviidae, the false cowries or trivias.

== Description ==
The maximum recorded shell length is 12.5 mm.

== Habitat ==
Minimum recorded depth is 150 m. Maximum recorded depth is 150 m.
