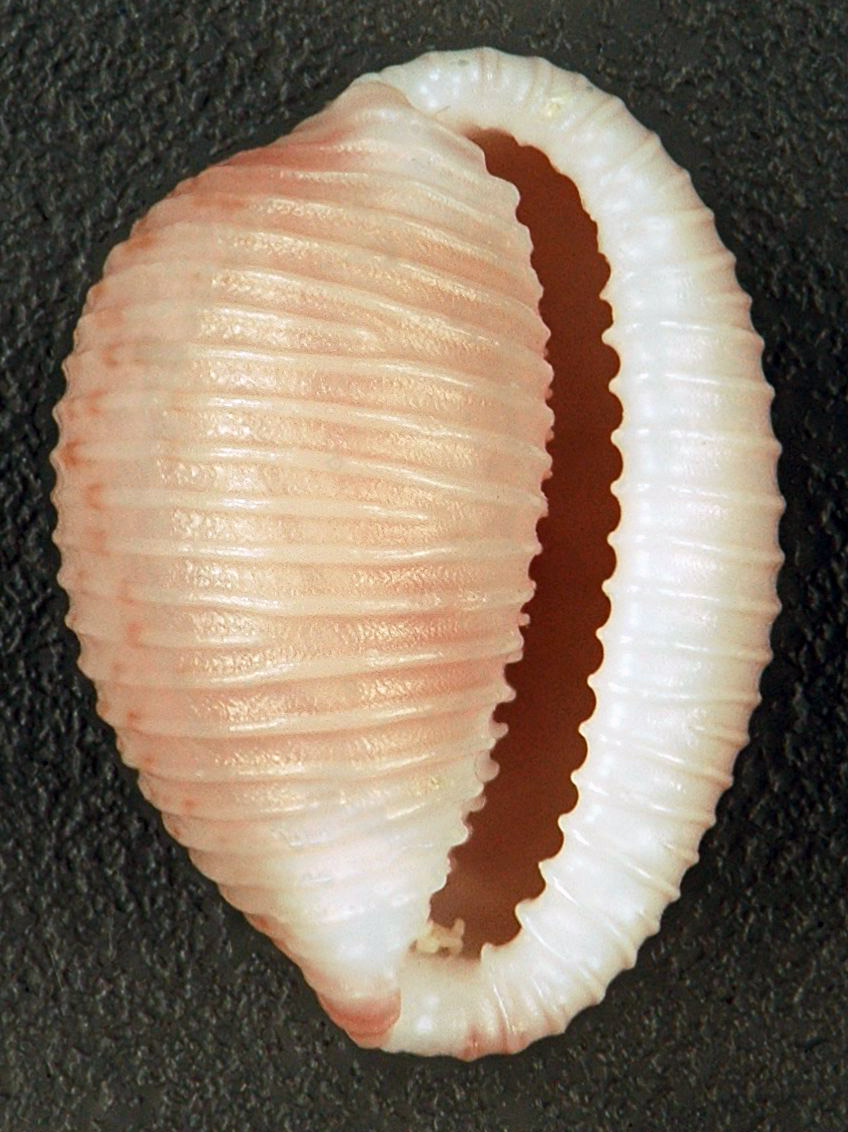
- Niveria suffusa shell

Scientific classification
- Kingdom: Animalia
- Phylum: Mollusca
- Class: Gastropoda
- Subclass: Caenogastropoda
- Order: Littorinimorpha
- Family: Triviidae
- Genus: Niveria
- Species: N. suffusa

Binomial name
- Niveria suffusa (Gray, 1827)

= Niveria suffusa =

Species of gastropod

Niveria suffusa is a species of small sea snail, a marine gastropod mollusk in the family Triviidae, the false cowries or trivias.

== Description ==
The maximum recorded shell length is 12 mm (0.47 in).

== Habitat ==
Minimum recorded depth is 0 m. Maximum recorded depth is 525 m (1,722 ft).
