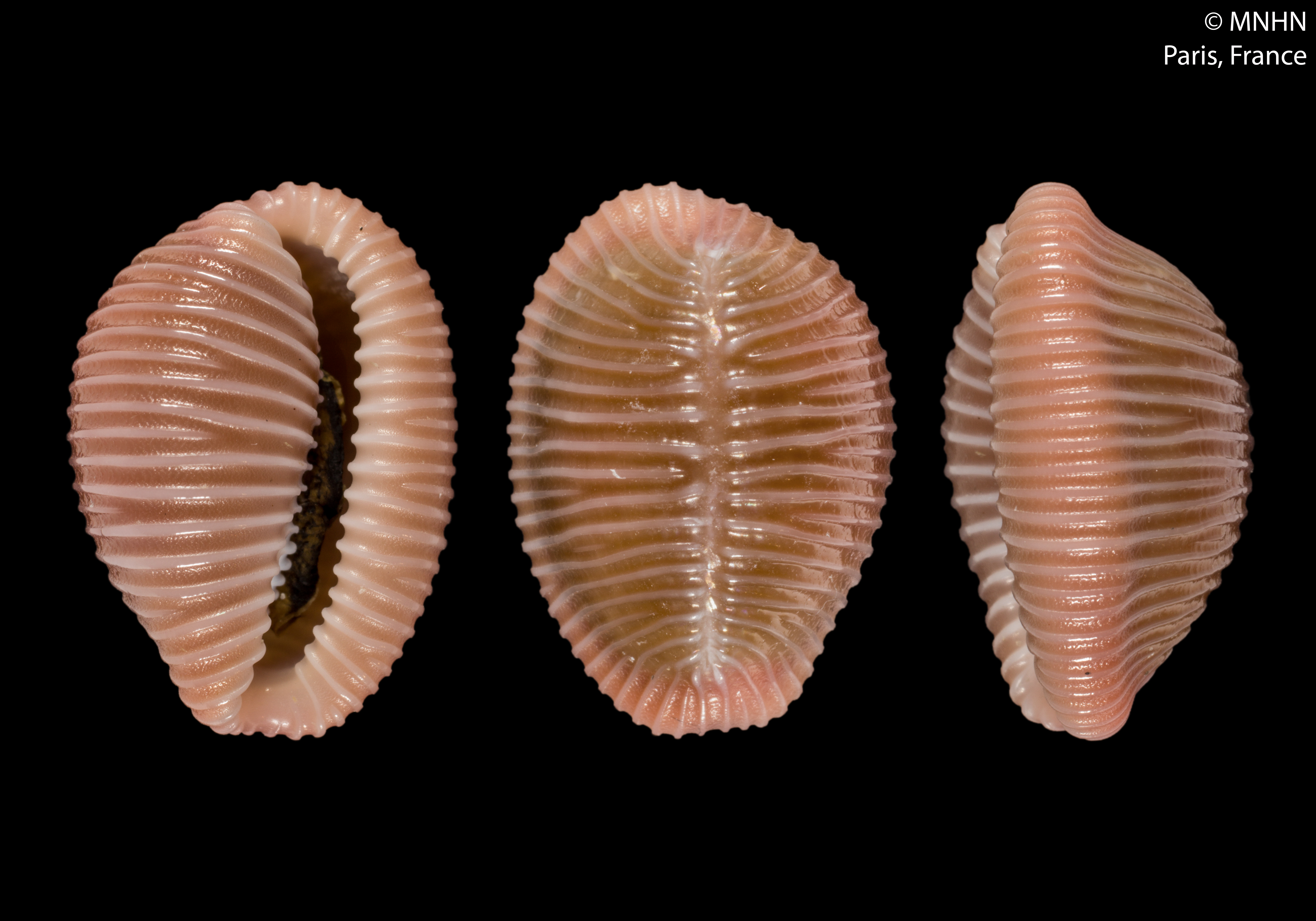
- Shell of Niveria liltvedi (holotype at MNHN, Paris)

Scientific classification
- Kingdom: Animalia
- Phylum: Mollusca
- Class: Gastropoda
- Subclass: Caenogastropoda
- Order: Littorinimorpha
- Family: Triviidae
- Genus: Niveria
- Species: N. liltvedi

Binomial name
- Niveria liltvedi (Gofas, 1984)

Synonyms
- Trivia liltvedi Gofas, 1984

= Niveria liltvedi =

Species of gastropod

Niveria liltvedi is a species of small sea snail, a marine gastropod mollusk in the family Triviidae, the false cowries or trivias.

== Distribution ==
This marine species occurs off Angola.
