= Triviella magnidentata =

Scientific classification
- Kingdom: Animalia
- Phylum: Mollusca
- Class: Gastropoda
- Subclass: Caenogastropoda
- Order: Littorinimorpha
- Family: Triviidae
- Genus: Triviella
- Species: T. magnidentata

Binomial name
- Triviella magnidentata (Liltved, 1986)

Synonyms
- Trivia magnidentata Liltved, 1986 (basionym)

Species of gastropod

Triviella magnidentata is a species of small sea snail, a marine gastropod mollusc in the family Triviidae, the false cowries or trivias.

== Description ==
The mantle is pale to dark grey, densely covered by fine, low, white protuberances. The siphon is elongated, recurved, and the same colour as the mantle. The cephalic tentacles are slender, cylindrical, rounded at the tips and white in colour. The foot is bulky, with a thick front rim, and white in colour. The mantle may have randomly spaced round or oval black spots. The shell is inflated pyriform up to 22mm long, commonly humped over the back third, tapering gradually towards the forward end. The labrum is fairly narrow and solidly formed, and may extend slightly beyond the body of the shell. There are 10 to 15 coarse denticles along the inner edge, and these extend as well defined ridges onto the dorsum. The columellar peristome has 11 to 19 denticles which may extend as ridges onto the base and into the aperture. The aperture is wide, particularly at the forward end. The vaulted dorsum is glossy, and may be slightly faceted. Shells from the Eastern Cape are usually a dark rose colour, with a white base, and those from the Western Cape are lighter or white.

== Distribution ==
This species occurs on the Atlantic coast of the Cape Peninsula, Western Cape Province to East London in the Eastern Cape.

== Natural history ==
This cowry lives on high-profile and low-profile reefs, in depths between 20 and 50 meters. It is often found well camouflaged on a tunicate which has a very similar appearance to the cowry's mantle.
