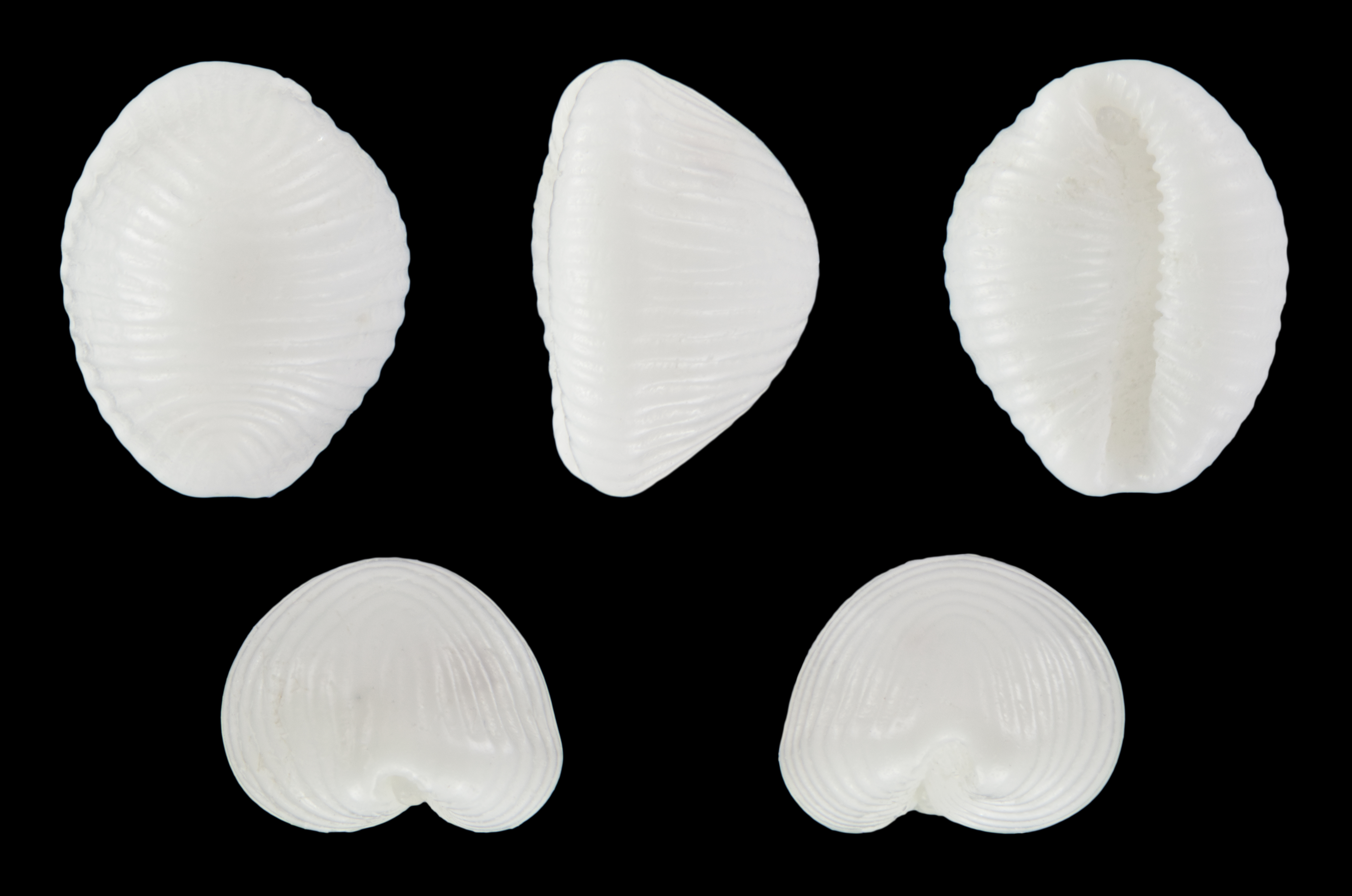

Scientific classification
- Kingdom: Animalia
- Phylum: Mollusca
- Class: Gastropoda
- Subclass: Caenogastropoda
- Order: Littorinimorpha
- Family: Triviidae
- Genus: Trivia
- Species: T. candidula

Binomial name
- Trivia candidula (Gaskoin, 1836)

Synonyms
- Cleotrivia candidula (Gaskoin, 1836); Cypraea candidula Gaskoin, 1836; Pusula candidula (Gaskoin, 1836); Trivia bitou Pallary, 1912

= Trivia candidula =

Species of gastropod

Trivia candidula is a species of small sea snail, a marine gastropod mollusc in the family Triviidae, the false cowries or trivias.

== Distribution ==
This species occurs in the Mediterranean Sea, in the North Atlantic Ocean (Azores, Cape Verdes, Canary Islands), off West Africa, off Angola; and in the Caribbean Sea.
