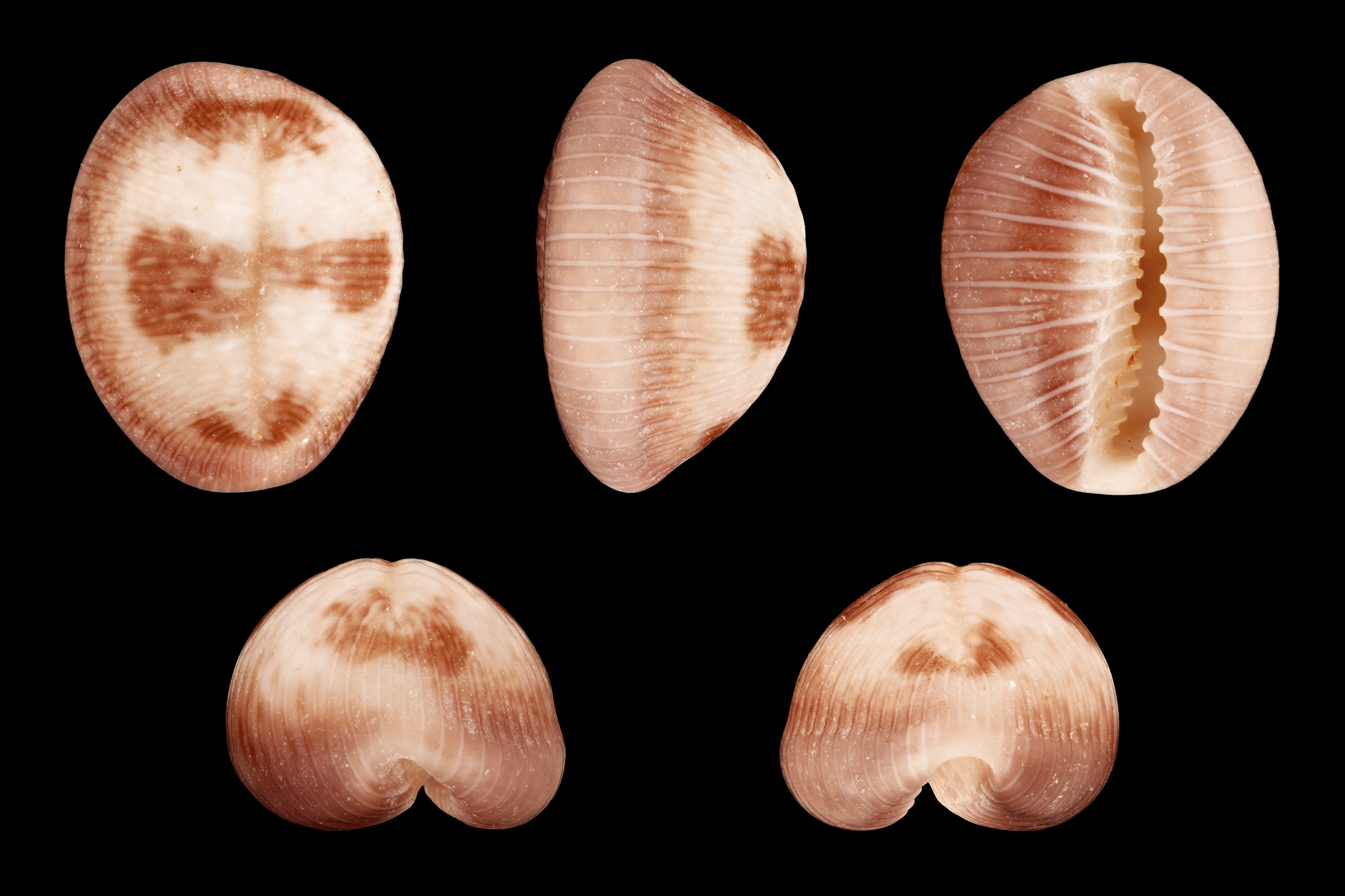

Scientific classification
- Kingdom: Animalia
- Phylum: Mollusca
- Class: Gastropoda
- Subclass: Caenogastropoda
- Order: Littorinimorpha
- Family: Triviidae
- Genus: Pusula
- Species: P. pediculus

Binomial name
- Pusula pediculus (Linnaeus, 1758)

= Pusula pediculus =

Species of gastropod

Pusula pediculus, common name the "coffee bean trivia", is a species of small sea snail, a marine gastropod mollusk in the family Triviidae, the false cowries or trivias. This species was previously known as Trivia pediculus.

== Distribution ==
Western Atlantic: common as beached shells in the Eastern Caribbean islands of the Lesser Antilles where they are commonly known as "puppy-eyes".

== Description ==
The maximum recorded shell length is 22 mm.

== Habitat ==
The minimum recorded depth for this species is 0 m; maximum recorded depth is 129 m.
