= Pseudopusula antillarum =

Scientific classification
- Kingdom: Animalia
- Phylum: Mollusca
- Class: Gastropoda
- Subclass: Caenogastropoda
- Order: Littorinimorpha
- Family: Triviidae
- Genus: Pseudopusula
- Species: P. antillarum

Binomial name
- Pseudopusula antillarum (Schilder, 1922)

Synonyms
- Cleotrivia antillarum (Schilder, 1922); Cypraea pulla Gaskoin, 1846 (Invalid: junior homonym of Cypraea pulla Gmelin, 1791); Cypraea subrostrata Gray, 1827 (Invalid: junior homonym of Cypraea subrostrata Gray, 1824); Cypraea triticea Blainville, 1826 (Invalid: junior homonym of Cypraera triticea Lamarck, 1810); Trivia antillarum Schilder, 1922 (basionym)

Species of gastropod

Pseudopusula antillarum is a species of small sea snail, a marine gastropod mollusk in the family Triviidae, the false cowries or Cleotrivias.

== Description ==
The maximum recorded shell length is 6 mm.

== Habitat ==
Minimum recorded depth is 9 m. Maximum recorded depth is 525 m.
