= Niveria maltbiana =

Scientific classification
- Kingdom: Animalia
- Phylum: Mollusca
- Class: Gastropoda
- Subclass: Caenogastropoda
- Order: Littorinimorpha
- Family: Triviidae
- Genus: Niveria
- Species: N. maltbiana

Binomial name
- Niveria maltbiana (Schwengel & McGinty, 1942)

Synonyms
- Pusula maltbiana (Schwengel & McGinty, 1942); Trivia maltbiana Schwengel & McGinty, 1942 (basionym)

Species of gastropod

Niveria maltbiana is a species of small sea snail, a marine gastropod mollusk in the family Triviidae, the false cowries or trivias.

== Description ==
The maximum recorded shell length is 13 mm.

== Habitat ==
Minimum recorded depth is 2 m. Maximum recorded depth is 91 m.
