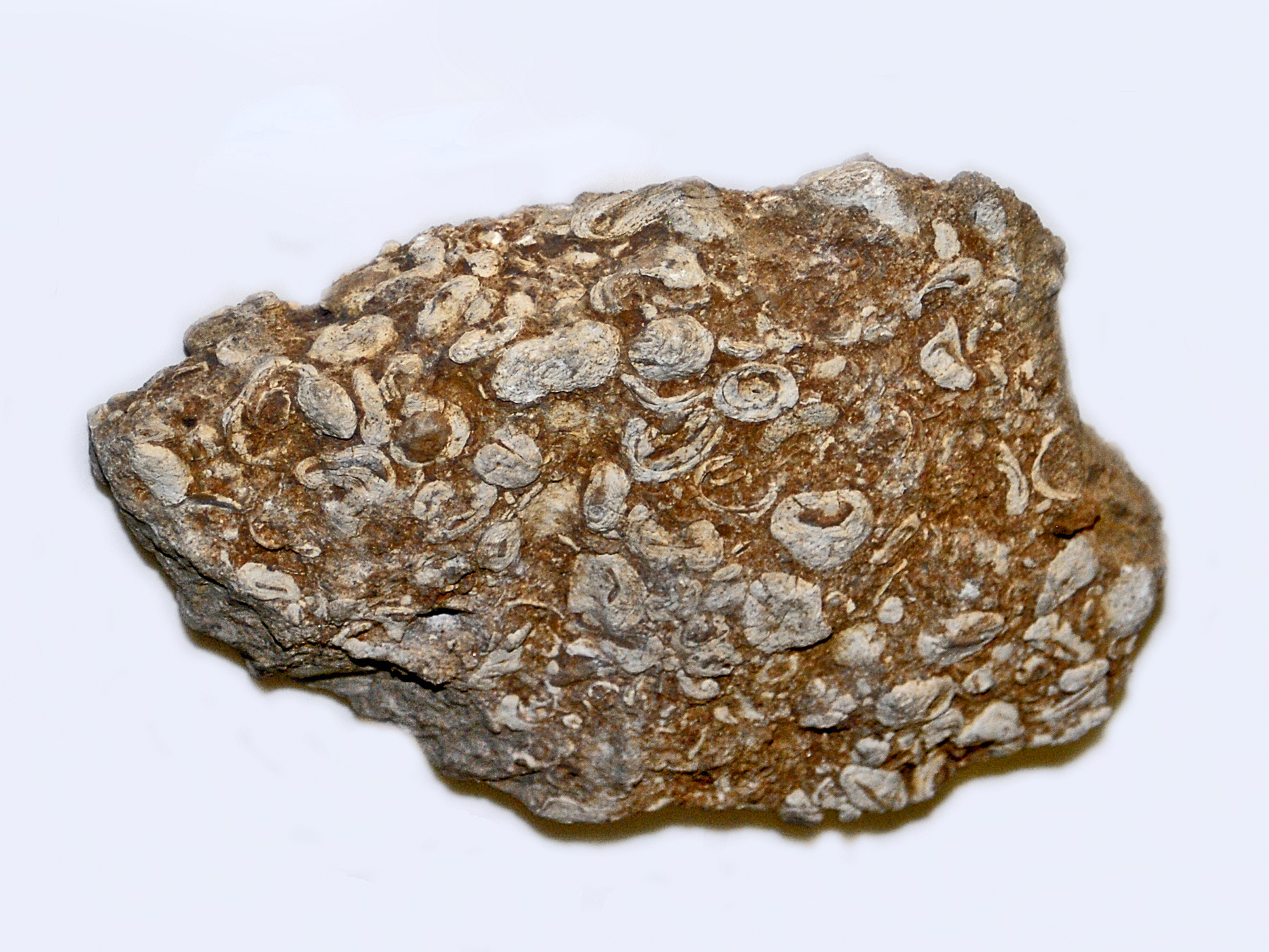
- Sphaerocodium kokeni From Triassic of Germany

Scientific classification
- Domain: Bacteria
- Phylum: Cyanobacteria
- Genus: † Sphaerocodium Rothpletz, 1890

Type species
- Sphaerocodium bornemanni Rothpletz, 1890

= Sphaerocodium =

Sphaerocodium Temporal range: Ordovician – Triassic 460.9–221.5 Ma

Extinct genus of bacteria

Sphaerocodium is a fossil that represents the remains of bacteria in the phylum Cyanobacteria, often called blue-green algae.

The species of Sphaerocodium recorded by the author Rothpletz could be symbiotic intergrowths of different encrusting organisms. Two genera (Rothpletzella and Wetheredella) were proposed in 1948 by Alan Wood to include these forms in two species from the Silurian of Gotland. These acts have sometimes been misinterpreted as dividing Sphaerocodium into two genera and treating Sphaerocodium as a synonym of Rothpletzella, whereas in fact Sphaerocodium is still considered a valid genus.

Sphaerocodium is characterised by having dichotomously-branching tubular filaments made of calcite, which formed encrusting masses on objects. These filaments branch in a fanlike pattern but remain in contact with each other; each filament is approximately 40-100μm wide and 30-50μ high. Filaments are not divided by septa.

Sphaerocodium was formerly assigned to the now-obsolete family porostromata.

== Fossil record ==
This genus is known in the fossil record from the Ordovician to the Triassic (from about 460.9 to 221.5 million years ago). Fossils of species within this genus have been found in Europe, Russia, United States, Canada, China and Australia.
