= Pseudopusula =

Scientific classification
- Kingdom: Animalia
- Phylum: Mollusca
- Class: Gastropoda
- Subclass: Caenogastropoda
- Order: Littorinimorpha
- Family: Triviidae
- Genus: Pseudopusula; Fehse & Grego, 2014

Genus of gastropods

Pseudopusula is a genus of small sea snails, marine gastropod mollusks in the family Triviidae, the false cowries or trivias.

== Species ==
Species within the genus Pseudopusula are as follows:

- Pseudopusula africana (F. A. Schilder, 1931)
- Pseudopusula antillarum (Schilder, 1922)
- Pseudopusula californiana (Gray, 1827)
- Pseudopusula campus (C. N. Cate, 1979)
- † Pseudopusula canariensis (Rothpletz & Simonelli, 1890)
- Pseudopusula circumdata (F. A. Schilder, 1931)
- † Pseudopusula floridana (Olsson & Harbison, 1953)
- Pseudopusula fusca (Gray in G. B. Sowerby I, 1832)
- Pseudopusula galapagensis (Melvill, 1900)
- Pseudopusula geigeri Fehse & Grego, 2014
- Pseudopusula gerberi Fehse & Grego, 2020
- Pseudopusula grohorum (Fehse & Grego, 2008)
- † Pseudopusula incomparabilis (Fehse, 2013)
- † Pseudopusula jozefgregoi (Fehse, 2011)
- † Pseudopusula parcicosta (Reiss, 1862)
- † Pseudopusula permixta (de Cristofori & Jan, 1832)
- Pseudopusula peruviana Fehse & Grego, 2020
- † Pseudopusula praecursor Fehse & Grego, 2014
- Pseudopusula problematica (F. A. Schilder, 1931)
- Pseudopusula rota (Weinkauff, 1881)
- Pseudopusula rubescens (J. E. Gray, 1833)
- Pseudopusula sanguinea (Sowerby I, 1832)
- Pseudopusula spongicola (Monterosato, 1923)

Species brought into synonymy

- Pseudopusula depauperata (Sowerby I, 1832): synonym of Discotrivia depauperata (G. B. Sowerby I, 1832)
