= Halococcus salifodinae =

Scientific classification
- Domain: Archaea
- Kingdom: Methanobacteriati
- Phylum: Methanobacteriota
- Class: Halobacteria
- Order: Halobacteriales
- Family: Halococcaceae
- Genus: Halococcus
- Species: H. salifodinae

Binomial name
- Halococcus salifodinae Denner et al. 1994

Species of archaeon

Halococcus salifodinae is an extremely halophilic archaeon, first isolated in an Austrian salt mine. It is a coccoid cell with pink pigmentation, its type strain being Blp (= ATCC 51437 = DSM 8989).
