= Halococcus dombrowskii =

Scientific classification
- Domain: Archaea
- Kingdom: Methanobacteriati
- Phylum: Methanobacteriota
- Class: Halobacteria
- Order: Halobacteriales
- Family: Halococcaceae
- Genus: Halococcus
- Species: H. dombrowskii

Binomial name
- Halococcus dombrowskii Stan-Lotter et al. 2002

Species of archaeon

Halococcus dombrowskii is an archaeon first isolated from a Permian alpine salt deposit. It is an extremely halophilic coccoid with type strain H4^{T} (= DSM 14522^{T} = NCIMB 13803^{T} = ATCC BAA-364^{T}).
