= Halococcus qingdaonensis =

Scientific classification
- Domain: Archaea
- Kingdom: Methanobacteriati
- Phylum: Methanobacteriota
- Class: Halobacteria
- Order: Halobacteriales
- Family: Halococcaceae
- Genus: Halococcus
- Species: H. qingdaonensis

Binomial name
- Halococcus qingdaonensis Wang et al. 2007

Synonyms
- H. qingdaogense (not validly published)

Species of archaea

Halococcus qingdaonensis is a halophilic archaeon in the family Halococcaceae.
