= Hedstroemia =

Hedstroemia Temporal range: Llandovery–Upper Devonian

Scientific classification
- Domain: Bacteria
- Kingdom: Bacillati
- Phylum: Cyanobacteriota
- Class: Cyanophyceae
- Order: Nostocales
- Family: Rivulariaceae
- Genus: †Hedstroemia; A. Rothpletz, 1913

Type species
- †Hedstroemia halimedoidea A. Rothpletz, 1913

Species
- †Hedstroemia bifilosa A. Rothpletz, 1913; †Hedstroemia halimedoidea A. Rothpletz, 1913

Extinct genus of algae

The extinct genus Hedstroemia was once thought to be a rivulariacean cyanobacterium. It forms oval blobs composed of sinuous tubes that have rounded outlines and occurs in conjunction with Solenopora.

Hedstroemia was formerly assigned to the now obsolete taxon porostromata. In 2020, the genus was assigned to the cyanobacteria order Nostocales.
