= Halococcus hamelinensis =

Scientific classification
- Domain: Archaea
- Kingdom: Methanobacteriati
- Phylum: Halobacteriota
- Class: Halobacteria
- Order: Halobacteriales
- Family: Halococcaceae
- Genus: Halococcus
- Species: H. hamelinensis

Binomial name
- Halococcus hamelinensis Goh et al. 2006

Synonyms
- Halococcus hamelinii (not validly published)

Species of archaea

Halococcus hamelinensis is a halophilic archaeon isolated from the stromatolites in Australia. These living stromatolites are exposed to extreme conditions of salinity, desiccation and UV radiation. H. hamelinensis is able to survive high UVC radiation doses due to the presence of the bacteria-like nucleotide excision repair genes uvrA, uvrB and uvrC (that encode the UvrABC endonuclease) as well as the photolyase phr2 gene. The uvrA, uvrB and uvrC genes are upregulated upon UVC irradiation.
