= Carlo Fornasini =

Italian scientist and politician

Cav. Dott. Carlo Fornasini.
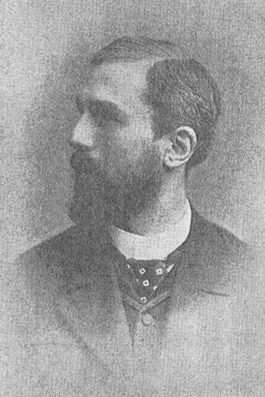
- Born: 3 November 1854; Bologna, Papal States
- Died: 24 December 1931 (aged 77); Bologna, Kingdom of Italy
- Education: University of Bologna
- Known for: Study of Foraminifera
- Spouse: Emilia née Erhardt
- Children: Carlo Francesco (son); Elsa (daughter)
- Scientific career
- Thesis: (1877)
- Doctoral advisor: Giovanni Capellini
- Author abbrev. (zoology): Forn.

Cavaliere dottore Carlo Fornasini (3 November 1854 – 24 December 1931) was an Italian micropalaeontologist who specialised in Foraminifera ('forams'). (Note: Foraminifera are single-celled aquatic organisms which produce an inorganic test (a shell). Many genera and species of Foraminifera have arisen and have become extinct over geological time. Their tests have been fossilised in sedimentary deposits. Those tests can be very varied and very distinctive in character, which make Foraminifera useful as index fossils.) He was a pioneer in using fossil forams to sequence marine sedimentary deposits by their relative dates; a technique called biostratigraphy.

== Biography ==
He was the third son of Francesco Fornasini, a medical doctor, and his wife Carlotta (née Ferraresi).

He studied natural sciences at the University of Bologna, under the guidance of Giovanni Capellini (1833-1922), the Professor of Geology there. In 1877, he graduated with honours as dottore (in effect, PhD), on the basis of a thesis which argued from the sequence of the fossil record that certain chalks, marls and clays in the Savena valley near Bologna dated from the Pliocene (5.3-2.6 Ma) rather than, as had previously been thought (including by Capellini), from the Miocene (23.0-5.3 Ma). That same year, Capellini published a paper about this discovery which relegated Fornasini's contribution to that of an assistant and which passed off Fornasini's conclusions as his own. That sort of behaviour has become unacceptable. In 1928, Michele Gortani (1883-1966), who had succeeded Capellini as Professor of Geology, wrote that "the Master had deprived his most promising student, Carlo Fornasini, of the pleasure and pride of announcing his discovery [...] and the results of his studies" (Italian: il Maestro aveva portato via al suo più promettente scolaro, Carlo Fornasini, il piacere e il vanto di annunciare la scoperta [...] e i risultati dello studio). Furthermore, Capellini may not have properly understood Fornasini's ideas. This affair may explain why Fornasini published nothing for the next four years.

In 1881, Fornasini returned to palaeontology, possibly persuaded by his friend Lodovico Foresti (1829-1913, assistente (assistant) at the Museo Geologico in Bologna). In September and October 1881, he helped to organise, and he attended, the 2nd International Geological Congress in Bologna, which settled important international questions of nomenclature, standardisation and cooperation. When the Italian Geological Society was founded in Bologna during the Congress, under the leadership of Giuseppe Meneghini (1811-1889) and Capellini, he was one of the original members. He remained a member until at least 1922, (Note: As of April 2019, no volumes of Boll. Soc. geol. ital. more recent than 1922 have been digitised.) and between 1883 and 1903 served several times as deputy secretary and as a member of its council. In 1883, he was appointed cavaliere (knight) in the Order of the Crown of Italy. In 1884, he became a corresponding member of the Reale Accademia del Poggio (nowadays, Accademia valdarnese del Poggio), Montevarchi. In 1885, he was one of the secretaries at the 3rd International Congress in Berlin; and in 1888, also at the 4th International Congress in London. In 1889, he was made an honorary member of the Reale Accademia delle scienze dell'Istituto di Bologna. From 1894 until 1910, he was an amministratore (director) of the Accademia in Bologna. In 1895, he was appointed assistente at the Museo Geologico, and in 1903 its conservatore (curator). In 1895, Fornasani and Vittorio Simonelli (1860-1929) founded the journal Rivista italiana di paleontologia ('Italian Review of Palaeontology'). Fornasini was no longer one of the principal editors after 1896, but he is named on the title page as a collaboratore (collaborator, or co-worker, or contributing editor) until 1904. In 1900 he joined the Accademia degli Zelanti of Acireale, Sicily as a corresponding member. Poor health forced him to give up his scientific work by 1911. He nevertheless maintained an interest in his speciality, and donated his library and his collection of specimens to the Museo Geologico.

He married Emilia Erhardt (at a date not determined), and they had two children: Carlo Francesco, a son, and Elsa, a daughter. He was mayor of Poggio Renatico, a comune (municipality) about 30 km (19 mi) northeast of Bologna, for almost 30 years. In 1902, he donated to Poggio Renatico the land on which the church of San Michele (Saint Michael) now stands.

He is commemorated by a bronze plaque in the Museo Geologico.

== Scientific work ==
His main interest was always Foraminifera, on which he became a world authority. He worked mostly as an amateur scientist, independent of academic institutions.

He published chiefly in the journals (dates of earliest and latest papers in parentheses) Bollettino della Società geologica italiana (1883-1905), Memorie della Reale Accademia delle Scienze dell'Istituto di Bologna (1889-1908), and Rivista italiana di paleontologia (1896-1903). He published more than sixty papers in those journals. They include a series of ten papers in Memorie entitled "Contributo alla conoscenza della Microfauna terziaria Italiana" ('Contribution to the Knowledge of Italian Microfauna of the Tertiary') (1889-1899), in which he attempted a critical analysis of all available information on the subject. That included identifying synonymy, where two or more scientists had unknowingly described the same species as new to science; an area of study as important in the advancement of taxonomy as the description of new species.

The WoRMS database lists 78 species of Foraminifera described by him, all between 1883 and 1902. Some of those species have been reclassified into other genera. That is a commonplace occurrence in biology, if a later researcher either revises a genus, or describes a new genus and moves that species into it. However, the fact that as of 2019 Fornasini is still credited as taxonomic authority for 77 of those 78 species shows that he was a careful, accurate and knowledgeable observer.

== Eponyms ==
The WoRMS database lists 18 species of Foraminifera whose specific epithet includes 'fornasini', all described between 1893 and 1948. They were most likely named in honour of Carlo Fornasini, but it would be necessary to consult the original descriptions to be certain.

== Fondazione Dott. Carlo Fornasini ==
In 1964, his son Carlo Francesco donated land and money in his will to set up in his father's memory the Fondazione Dott. Carlo Fornasini at Poggio Renatico. Its original aim was to encourage research into human organ transplantation, later expanded to the more general topic of social and human sciences, with particular regard to ethics and bioethics.
