= Algospongia =

Algospongia Temporal range: Ordovician–Permian

Scientific classification
- Domain: Eukaryota
- Class: †Algospongia; Termier et al. 1977, orth. mut. emend. Vachard & Cózar 2010

Orders
- †Aoujgaliida (bot.: †Aoujgaliales); †Moravamminida (bot.: †Moravamminales)

Synonyms
- †Palaeosiphonocladales (for a subset of taxa)

Class of fossil organism

Algospongia is a class of small, calcified fossil organisms of uncertain taxonomic position, assigned in a comprehensive 2010 review to "Animalia" incertae sedis (possibly Protista), but both prior to and post that to an unnamed phylum of Algae; other workers simply list them as Problematica (or Microproblematica), a term historically used for a number of other fossil zoological groups of uncertain placement. They occur in carbonate rocks of the Paleozoic era and their last representatives occur in the Late Permian geological period. Characteristic genera include Aoujgalia, Moravammina and the early-appearing Wetheredella, although the taxonomic validity (and algosponge affinity) of the last named genus has been disputed.

== Background and possible taxonomic affinity ==
Algospongia (vernacular name: algosponges) is a taxon of calcified fossil organisms comprising around 90 accepted genera and several hundred species, treated taxonomically as a single class in an unspecified phylum. Originally considered to be fossil sponges or "pseudo algae", an assignment now refuted, their taxonomic position is somewhat unresolved. Of the three most prominent recent researchers, B. Mamet (Belgium) assigns certain families (e.g. Palaeoberesellaceae, Beresellaceae and Issinellaceae) to Chlorophyta (green algae) as an order of that phylum (Palaeosiphonocladales), at least one other family (Ungdarellaceae) to Rhodophyta (red algae), and some other genera (Groenlandella, Labyrinthoconus) simply to "Microproblematica". Meanwhile, D. Vachard (France) and P. Cózar (Spain) treated Algospongia (such as the family Calcifoliaceae) as Algae incertae sedis, before deciding (in 2010) against any algal affinity and reassigning them to the [zoological] protists, as a group possibly paralleling the Foraminifera. Since that paper, Cózar has continued to use zoological terminology in his published works, while Vachard has once again assigned the group to the Algae incertae sedis, lying hypothetically mid-way between the extant Rhodophyta and Chlorophyta. A number of the genera allocated to Algospongia in the present treatment (which follows Vachard & Cózar, 2010 in the main) were recently (2021) treated as either Foraminifera, or as red or green algae, in the World Register of Marine Species, a situation that is currently under revision. (Note: As at 2021 (although the information cited may date from earlier compilation), the World Foraminifera Database (which forms part of the World Register of Marine Species) lists 18 of the present "algosponge" genera as Foraminifera (Alanyana, Aoujgalia, Baculella, Disonella, Evlania, Fourstonella, Kettnerammina, Litya, Moravammina, Palachemonella/Palaschemonella, Proninella, Saccorhina, Septammina, Stacheia, Stacheoides, Triplosphaerina, Vasicekia and Wetheredella), while the algal portion of WoRMS (imported from AlgaeBase) lists 14 algosponge genera as green algae (Anthracoporellopsis, Asphaltinella, Beresella, Crassikamaena, Cribrokamaena, Dvinella, Eomizzia, Issinella, Jansaella, Kamaena, Kamaenella, Parakamaena, Trinodella and Uraloporella) and 7 as red algae (Amorfia, Cuneiphycus, Donezella, Epistacheoides, Komia, Masloviporidium and Ungdarella), with Metakamaena assigned to "Protozoa", Asphaltina to "Biota incertae sedis", and the remaining genera not yet mentioned. However it appears (March 2023) that at least some of these names have more recently been reallocated in AlgaeBase, information that is anticipated to be reflected in WoRMS in due course.) For convenience in the present article, the published summary of Vachard & Cózar (2010) is presented below (with modifications as necessary), which treats the relevant genera as a single class (not split e.g. among different botanical phyla) under zoological nomenclature, however also recognizing that the botanical treatment now preferred by Vachard may in fact be correct, an approach currently adopted in the Interim Register of Marine and Nonmarine Genera (IRMNG).

Members of the group occur in the fossil record from the Ordovician to the Late Permian periods, although only Wetheredella is prominent prior to the start of the Devonian. They share a common wall appearance (frequently perforated), possess functional apertures between successive chambers or cells, and appear to have had a sessile or attached mode of life, at depths considered too deep for green algae but possibly overlapping those of red algae, while morphologically they do not exactly resemble members of either of those groups. The most comprehensive recent taxonomic treatment of the group is by Vachard & Cózar, 2010, in which they are treated as a single class divided into 2 orders (Aoujgalida and Moravamminida, corresponding to Aoujgaliales and Moravamminales in botanical nomenclature) typified by the genera Aoujgalia and Moravammina, respectively, plus a number of suborders; this treatment is reproduced below, together with adjustments based on more recent literature of relevance.

== Morphology ==
Algosponges are described as a group of sessile or attached microorganisms with characteristic calcified walls described as "yellowish, apparently granular" that are frequently perforated, and possess either lateral or terminal apertures between successive chambers or cells. The order Aoujgalida (bot.: Aoujgaliales) is characterised by Vachard & Cózar as follows (emended description):

Attached, laminar to cylindrical or conical, bifurcated tests, composed of rows of chambers forming laminae, with a concentric or uniseriate growth. Encrusting or erect test. Irregular shape, generally subconical, occasionally cylindrical, ramified. Endoskeleton constituted by rows of chambers connected with a central or basal communication. Chambers quadratic to hemispherical, generally irregular in shape. The system of attachment is generally undifferentiated but can be preserved as "baskets" (e.g., Ungdarella). Wall calcitic, yellowish, hyaline and granular, generally compact or finely perforate (Pseudostacheoides, Costacheoides gen. nov.). Some interruptions of the chamber wall can exist (Ungdarella). In the [suborder] Calcifoliina, the interlaminar space is firstly thinner and then absent because the laminae evolve to petaloid forms, which finally contain filaments.

while the order Moravamminida (bot.: Moravamminales) is described as follows (emended description):

Tests generally tubular, sometimes bifurcated, rarely laminar, divided by foraminifer-like septa or pseudosepta. The system of attachment, generally unknown or constituted by a whorl of chambers around the substrate (e.g., Kettnerammina, Moravammina); by "bracelets" (Dil et al., 1977) (Exvotarisella, Ardengostella); or rarely, it is encrusting (Evlania). Wall calcareous, hyaline (granular to prismatic), generally perforated, with relatively common visible polysynthetic twinning of calcite, and exceptionally monocristalline extinction. Perforations are generally simple, aspondyl pores, in some taxa with up to third order of subdivisions. Pores vary from rare and sporadic to abundant and concentrated in specialized sectors. Generally functional and communicating with the exterior ([suborder] Moravamminina), they become blind ([suborder] Beresellina).

== Classification ==
The treatment below is based on that published by Vachard & Cózar in 2010, (alternative, botanical treatment indicated separated by "/"); more recent genera (post 2010) and, in some cases, corrections have been added per other available sources. If the group is considered zoological (i.e. non-Algal), nomenclature should follow the provisions of the International Code of Zoological Nomenclature (ICZN); if treated as Algae incertae sedis as per Vachard et al., 2016 and Vachard, 2021, the botanical Code (now International Code of Nomenclature for algae, fungi, and plants or ICNafp) applies. The possibly analogous Foraminifera (protists or Protozoa in many classifications) are members of the clade SAR, which is presently assigned to the kingdom Chromista in many classifications.

Kingdom incertae sedis (Animalia or Protista/Protozoa, or Plantae, inferred from Vachard, 2021)

- Phylum incertae sedis ("Algae incertae sedis" in Vachard, 2021)
  - Class †Algospongia Termier, Termier & Vachard, 1977
    - Order †Aoujgaliida Termier, Termier & Vachard, 1975 / bot.: †Aoujgaliales Termier et al., 1975 ex Vachard & Cózar, 2010
      - Suborder †Aoujgaliina G. Termier et al., 1975, nomen translat. Vachard & Cózar, 2010 / bot.: -inae?
        - Family †Aoujgaliidae Termier, Termier & Vachard, 1975 / bot.: †Aoujgaliaceae Termier, Termier & Vachard, 1975
          - †Aoujgalia G. Termier & H. Termier, 1950 (syn.: †Mametella Brenkle, 1977)
          - †Asteroaoujgalia Brenckle, 2004
          - †Costacheoides Vachard & Cózar, 2010
          - †Epistacheoides A.A. Petryk & B.L. Mamet, 1972
          - †Pseudostacheoides A.A. Petryk & B.L. Mamet, 1972
          - †Roquesselsia Termier, Termier & Vachard, 1977
          - †Sinustacheoides Termier, Termier & Vachard, 1977
          - †Stacheoides R.H. Cummings, 1955 (syn.: †Chantonia Termier, Termier & Vachard, 1977; †Stacheoidella Mamet & Roux in Mamet et al., 1987; †Stacheoides Cummings, 1951, nom. nud.)
          - †Valuzieria Termier, Termier & Vachard, 1977 (listed under accepted name †Aoujgalia in Vachard & Cózar, 2010, Table 3, but reinstated as a distinct genus by Vachard et al., 2016
        - Family †Cuneiphycidae Vachard & Cózar, 2010 / bot.: †Cuneiphycaceae D. Vachard & P. Cózar, 2010 ('Cuneiphycidae')
          - †Cuneiphycus J.H. Johnson, 1960
          - †Iberiaella L.G. Racz, 1984 (syn.: †Contortiporidium Maslov, 1973 - latter name not in Vachard & Cózar, 2010)
          - †Masloviporidium J.R. Groves & B.L. Mamet in D.F. Toomey & M.H. Nitecki, 1985 (syn.: †Pseudodonezella Mamet & Herbig, 1990; latter name incorrectly listed as syn. of †Frustulata (Calcifoliidae) in Vachard & Cózar, 2010, Table 3)
          - †Multiporidium Vachard & Cózar, 2010
        - Family †Stacheiidae Loeblich & Tappan, 1961 / bot.: †Stacheiaceae Loeblich & Tappan, 1961
          - †Fourstonella R.H. Cummings, 1955 (syn.: †Amorfia L. Rácz, 1964; †Chuvashovia Vachard & Montenat, 1981; †Eflugelia (sometimes as "Efluegelia") Vachard in Massa & Vachard, 1979; †Foliophycopsis Gaillot, 2006; †Parastacheia B. Mamet & A. Roux, 1977)
          - †Stacheia Brady, 1876 (syn.: †Conilalia Vachard in Massa & Vachard, 1979)
        - Family †Ungdarellidae Maslov, 1956 / bot.: †Ungdarellaceae Maslov, 1954
          - †Cheggatella J. Poncet, 1989
          - †Cheggatellina B. Mamet & A. Preat, 2013 (latter name not in Vachard & Cózar, 2010)
          - †Erevanella V.P. Maslov, 1962
          - †Foliophycus J.H. Johnson, 1960
          - †Komia K.B. Korde, 1951 (syn.: †Pseudokomia L. Rácz, 1964; †Turkomia Gaillot, 2006)
          - †Petschoria K.B. Korde, 1951
          - †Ungdarella V.P. Maslov, 1956 (syn.: †Pseudoungdarella Ivanova, 1999; †Suundukella B. Chuvashov & A. Anfimov, 2007; †Ungdarelloides B. Chuvashov & A. Anfimov, 2007; †Urtasimella B. Chuvashov & A. Anfimov, 2007)
          - †Ungdarellita Mamet & Villa, 2004
      - Suborder †Calcifoliina G. Termier et al., 1977 nomen translat. Vachard & Cózar, 2010 / bot.: -inae?
        - Family †Calcifoliidae Shuysky in Chuvashov et al., 1987 / bot.: †Calcifoliaceae Termier, Termier & Vachard, 1977
          - †Calcifolium M.S. Svecov & L.M. Birina, 1935
          - †Falsocalcifolium D. Vachard & P. Cózar, 2005
          - †Frustulata V.D. Saltovskaja in M.R. Dzhalolov, 1984
        - Family †Fasciellidae Shuysky, 1999 / bot.: †Fasciellaceae Shuysky, 1999
          - †Fasciella R.M. Ivanova, 1973 (syn.: †Shartymophycus E.L. Kulik in O.L. Einor, 1973)
          - †Fascifolium D. Vachard, A. Karim & P. Cózar in Vachard & Cózar, 2010
    - Order †Moravammida Pokorný, 1951 / bot.: Moravamminales Pokorný, 1951 ex Vachard in Termier et al., 1975; syn.: †Palaeosiphonocladales Shuysky, 1985
      - Suborder †Beresellina Vachard, 1994, nomen. translat. Vachard & Cózar, 2010 / bot.: -inae?
        - Family †Beresellidae Maslov & Kulik, 1956 / bot.: †Beresellaceae Deloffre, 1988
          - †Ardengostella Vachard in Perret & Vachard, 1977
          - †Beresella V.N. Makhaev ex V.P. Maslov & E.L. Kulik, 1956
          - †Dvinella I.V. Khvorova, 1949 (syn.: †Eomizzia R. Endô & M. Horiguchi, 1957)
          - †Trinodella (Maslov & Kulik, 1956) Vachard & Cózar, 2010 (previously a subgenus of Dvinella)
          - †Uraloporella K.B. Korde, 1950 (syn.: †Samarella V.P. Maslov & E.L. Kulik, 1956)
      - Suborder †Donezellina G. Termier et al., 1975, nomen translat. Vachard & Cózar, 2010 / bot.: -inae?
        - Family †Claracrustidae Vachard in Vachard et al., 2001 / bot.: †Claracrustaceae Vachard in Vachard et al., 2001
          - †Asphaltinella B. Mamet & A. Roux, 1978
          - †Claracrusta Vachard & Montenat, 1981 (syn.: †Berestovia O.I. Berchenko in Y.V. Teslenko, 1982)
          - †Denisella Vachard & Cózar, 2010
          - †Kleinbergella B. Mamet & F. Boulvain, 1992
          - †Peristacheia B. Mamet & A. Roux, 1983
          - †Pokorninella Vachard in Perret & Vachard, 1977
          - †Precorninella Vachard, 1991
          - †Ungdarellina B. Mamet, 2002
        - Family †Donezellidae Termier, Termier & Vachard, 1975 / bot.: †Donezellaceae Termier, Termier & Vachard, 1975
          - †Alanyana T. Güvenç, 1967 (listed under accepted name Donezella in Vachard & Cózar, 2010, Table 3, but only as "possible synonym" in text)
          - †Donezella V.P. Maslov, 1929 ex Vachard in Meissami et al., 1978 (syn.: †Goksuella T. Güvenç, 1966)
          - †Kamaenella B.L. Mamet & A. Roux, 1975
          - †Praedonezella E.L. Kulik in O.L. Einor, 1973
      - Suborder †Moravamminina Pokorný, 1951, nomen translat. Vachard & Cózar, 2010 / bot.: -inae?
        - Family †Anthracoporellopsidae Shuysky, 1985 / bot.: †Anthracoporellopsidacae Shuysky, 1985 ex Vachard in Vachard et al., 1989
          - †Anthracoporellopsis V.P. Maslov, 1956
          - †Brazhnikovia O.I. Berchenko, 1981
          - †Catenaella V.P. Shuysky, 1987 (as "Catenaenella" (misspelling) in Vachard & Cózar, 2010, Table 3)
          - †Crassikamaena P.L. Brenckle, 1985
          - †Culmiella V.P. Shuysky in V.P. Shuysky & D.I. Schirschova in V.N. Dubatolov & T.A. Moskalenko, 1988
          - †Dokutchaevskella O.I. Berchenko, 1981
          - †Einoriella V.D. Saltovskaja in M.R. Dzhalolov, 1984 (as "Einorella" (misspelling) in Vachard & Cózar, 2010, Table 3)
          - †Evlania Bykova, 1952
          - †Evlaniopsis Vachard & Montenat, 1981
          - †Groenlandella B.L. Mamet & L. Stemmerik, 2000
          - †Pseudonanopora B.L. Mamet & A. Roux, 1975
        - Family †Issinellidae Deloffre, 1987 / bot.: †Issinellaceae Deloffre, 1987
          - †Amarellina B. Mamet, 1995
          - †Calcicaulis V.P. Shuysky & D.I. Schirschova in V.P. Shuysky, 1987
          - †Dreesenulella Vachard, 1991 (syn.: †Baculella Conil & Dreesen in Dreesen et al., 1985) note: synonymy reversed from that given in Vachard & Cózar, 2010, per Vachard et al., 2016
          - †Eouraloporella O.I. Berchenko, 1981
          - †Issinella E.A. Reitlinger, 1954
          - †Issinellina V.P. Shuysky in V.P. Shuysky & D.I. Schirschova in V.N. Dubatolov & T.A. Moskalenko, 1988
          - †Jansaella B.L. Mamet & A. Roux, 1975
          - †Lemosquetella B. Mamet & A. Sebbar, 1998
          - †Luteotubulus Vachard in Vachard et al., 1977
          - †Serrisinella Vachard, 1991
          - †Tubus B.I. Tchuvashov, 1985
          - †Zidella V.D. Saltovskaja in M.R. Dzhalolov, 1984
        - Family †Labyrinthoconidae Langer, 1979 / bot.: †Labyrinthoconaceae Langer, 1979
          - †Labyrinthoconus W. Langer, 1979
          - †Proninella Reitlinger in Menner & Reitlinger, 1971 (syn.: †Eifeliflabellum W. Langer, 1979)
        - Family †Moravamminidae Pokorný, 1951 / bot.: †Moravamminaceae Pokorný, 1951
          - †Kettnerammina Pokorný, 1951 (syn.: †Saccorhina Bykova in Bykova & Polenova, 1955)
          - †Moravammina Pokorný, 1951 (syn.: †Litya Bykova in Bykova & Polenova, 1955)
          - †Palachemonella H. Beckmann, 1953 (misspelling: †Palaschemonella H. Beckmann, 1953)
          - †Pseudoissinella B.L. Mamet & B. Rudloff, 1972 (listed under accepted name Kettnerammina in Vachard & Cózar, 2010, Table 3, but only as "possible synonym" in text)
          - †Triangulinella B. Mamet & A. Préat, 1985
          - †Vasicekia Pokorný, 1951 (syn.: †Parmacaulis V.P. Shuysky & D.I. Schirschova in V.P. Shuysky, 1987)
        - Family †Palaeoberesellidae Mamet & Roux, 1974 / bot.: †Palaeoberesellaceae Mamet & Roux, 1974
          - †Devonoscalae Langer, 1979 (misspelled ("Devonoscala") in Vachard & Cózar, 2010; syn: †Stylaella O.I. Berchenko, 1981)
          - †Exvotarisella G.F. Elliott, 1970
          - †Kamaena I.A. Antropov in A.P. Jousé, 1967 (syn.: †Subkamaena O.I. Berchenko, 1981)
          - †Kamaenina B. Mamet & A. Preat, 2013 (latter name not in Vachard & Cózar, 2010)
          - †Kulikaella O.I. Berchenko, 1981
          - †Metakamaena R. Endô in Kobayashi & Toriyama, 1969
          - †Palaeoberesella B.L. Mamet & A. Roux, 1975 (syn.: †Septammina Meunier, 1888)
          - †Parakamaena B.L. Mamet & A. Roux, 1975
          - †Pseudokamaena B.L. Mamet in A.A. Petryk & B.L. Mamet, 1972
          - †Turgajella R.M. Ivanova in Bogush et al., 1990 (variant spelling: †Turgaella R.M. Ivanova in Bogush et al., 1990)
          - †Wapitella B. Mamet & A. Preat, 2013 (latter name not in Vachard & Cózar, 2010)
        - Family †Uralitidae Vachard, 1991 / bot.: †Uralitaceae D. Vachard, 1991 ('Uralitidae')
          - †Cribrokamaena P.L. Brenckle, 1985
          - †Uralites B.I. Tchuvashov, 1973
      - Suborder †Wetheredellina Vachard in Dil et al., 1977, nomen translat. Vachard & Cózar, 2010 / bot.: -inae? (Note: Both the validity, and the taxonomic assignment, of Wetheredella, the type genus of this suborder and of the family Wetheredellidae, have been challenged by Jarochowska & Munnecke (2014) (for reference refer text), who contend that it is in fact a junior synonym of the genus Allonema Ulrich & Bassler, 1904, presently classified as [Animalia] incertae sedis. If this proposition is accepted by subsequent workers, the naming and validity of this suborder and its constituents, plus their present assignment to Algospongia, would require re-assessment.)
        - Family †Asphaltinidae Vachard & Cózar, 2010 / bot.: †Asphaltinaceae D. Vachard & P. Cózar, 2010 ('Asphaltinidae')
          - †Asphaltina B.L. Mamet in A.A. Petryk & B.L. Mamet, 1972
          - †Asphaltinoides J.A. Devera, 1987 (syn.: †Cuzbassia R.M. Ivanova in I.O. Bogush, R.M. Ivanova & V.A. Luchinina, 1990)
          - †Permocatena D. Vachard & P. Miconnet, 1990
        - Family †Wetheredellidae Vachard in Dil et al., 1976 / bot.: †Wetheredellaceae Berchenko in Chuvashov et al., 1987
          - †Disonella Conil & Lys, 1964 (syn.: †Triplosphaerina Edgell, 2004)
          - †Sphaeroporella I.A. Antropov in A.P. Jousé, 1967
          - †Wetheredella Wood, 1948 (syn.: †Catena V.P. Maslov, 1956; †Cateniphycus V.P. Maslov in J.A. Orlov, 1963; Catena Maslov not listed in Vachard & Cózar, 2010)

== Geological occurrence and biostratigraphic value ==
The stratigraphic range of selected algosponge genera is summarised in Figure 15 of Vachard & Cózar (2010). From this Figure it is apparent that Wetheredella is the sole representative of the group from the Upper Ordovician through the Silurian, being joined by Asphaltinoides a little before the Silurian ends. The majority of other genera then develop within, and/or are restricted to, the Devonian through Carboniferous periods, with a relatively small number (16) persisting through the Permian before all becoming extinct by the end of that period. The same authors also comment (their "Conclusion" no. 4) that "Biostratigraphically, the algospongia can become the most important group in the Tournaisian biostratigraphy with the conodonts, due to the rarity of foraminifera and true dasycladales at least in Europe (western Palaeo-Tethys) and Gondwana."

== Phylogeny ==
Vachard & Cózar (2010) present a suggested phylogeny for algosponge suborders and families in their Figure 17, which shows the Wetheredellina as the basal suborder giving rise to both the Moravamminina and the Donezellina, the Moravamminina then giving rise to the Beressellina, and Donezellina to the Aoujgaliina which in turn give rise to the Calcifoliina.

== Alternative taxonomic opinions ==
As mentioned above, members of the claimed single class Algospongia have been assigned to different taxonomic groups over time, with no clear consensus emerging. More recently Wetheredella, treated as the earliest algosponge genus to appear in the fossil record by Vachard & Cózar, has been re-interpreted as the same as (and therefore junior synonym) of the incertae sedis taxon Allonema (and thus, presumably, not an algosponge) by Jarochowska & Munnecke (2014), a proposal that has been admitted as "possible" by subsequent workers e.g. Liu et al., 2016.
