= Pseudopusula depauperata =

Scientific classification
- Kingdom: Animalia
- Phylum: Mollusca
- Class: Gastropoda
- Subclass: Caenogastropoda
- Order: Littorinimorpha
- Family: Triviidae
- Genus: Pseudopusula
- Species: P. depauperata

Binomial name
- Pseudopusula depauperata (Sowerby I, 1832)

Synonyms
- Cypraea depauperata Sowerby I, 1832 (original combination); Discotrivia dartevellei (Knudsen, 1955); Pusula depauperata (Sowerby I, 1832); Trivia dartevellei Knudsen, 1955

Species of gastropod

Pseudopusula depauperata is a species of small sea snail, a marine gastropod mollusk in the family Triviidae, the false cowries or trivias.

== Distribution ==
This species occurs in the Atlantic Ocean off Congo and Angola.
