= Lichen stromatolite =

Lichen stromatolites are laminar calcretes that are proposed as being formed by a sequence of repetitions of induration followed by lichen colonization. Endolithic lichens inhabit areas between grains of rock, chemically and physically weathering that rock, leaving a rind, which is then indurated (hardened), then recolonized.

== See also ==
- Stromatolite
