= Girvanella =

Girvanella Temporal range: Cambrian–Cretaceous

Scientific classification
- Domain: Bacteria
- Kingdom: Bacillati
- Phylum: Cyanobacteriota
- Class: Cyanophyceae
- Order: Oscillatoriales
- Genus: †Girvanella; Nicholson & Etheridge, 1878

Type species
- Girvanella problematica Nicholson & Etheridge, 1878 emend. Wood, 1957

Species
- †G. kasakiensis Maslov, 1949 emend. Mamet & Roux, 1975; †G. problematica Nicholson & Etheridge, 1878 emend. Wood, 1957; †G. staminea Garwood, 1931; †G. wetheredii Chapman, 1908

Synonyms
- Nicholsonia Korde, 1973

Genus of prokaryotes

Girvanella is a fossil thought to represent the calcified sheath of a filamentous cyanobacterium known from the Burgess Shale and other Cambrian fossil deposits. Specimens are also known from the Early Ordovician San Juan Formation, Argentina.

Girvanella was originally described as a foraminifera. It was later assigned to the now-obsolete family porostromata. In 2020, it was assigned to the order Oscillatoriales.

Girvanella is characterised by having flexing, tubular filaments with a uniform diameter usually between 10 and 30 microns (rarely up to 100 microns). The walls of these tubules are relatively thick and calcareous. These tubules are typically (but not always) twisted together into nodules, and often encrust other objects including foraminifera.

Fossils of Girvanella are found from the Cambrian through the Cretaceous.

Girvanella fossils are found in a wide range of environmental conditions, most commonly shallow-shelf carbonate facies, but also in nonmarine limestones. Recent caliche deposits in Barbados may be referable to Girvanella.
