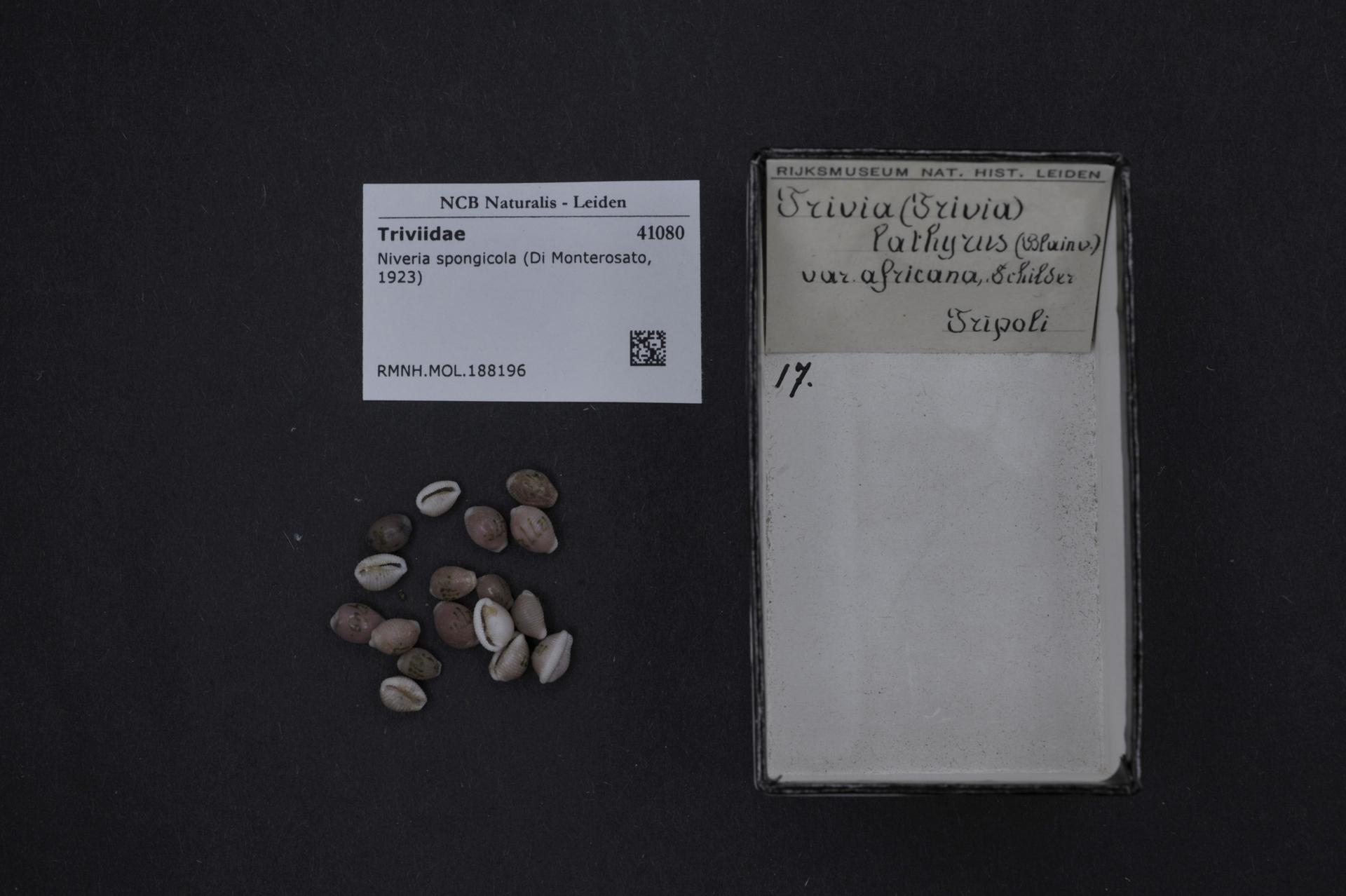

Scientific classification
- Kingdom: Animalia
- Phylum: Mollusca
- Class: Gastropoda
- Subclass: Caenogastropoda
- Order: Littorinimorpha
- Family: Triviidae
- Genus: Pseudopusula
- Species: P. spongicola

Binomial name
- Pseudopusula spongicola (Monterosato, 1923)

Synonyms
- Trivia pulex africana Schilder, 1931; Trivia spongicola (Monterosato, 1923)

= Pseudopusula spongicola =

Species of gastropod

Pseudopusula spongicola is a species of small sea snail, a marine gastropod mollusk in the family Triviidae, the false cowries or trivias.
