= Vittorio Simonelli =

Italian geologist and paleontologist

Vittorio Simonelli (May 1860, in Arezzo – 9 February 1929, in San Quirico d'Orcia) was an Italian geologist and paleontologist.

== Biography ==
He studied natural sciences at the University of Pisa as a pupil of Giuseppe Meneghini. From 1883 he taught classes in physical geography at Pisa, later travelling to Munich, where in 1889/90 he studied paleontology with Karl von Zittel and August Rothpletz. From 1891 to 1895 he was an assistant to the chair of geology at the University of Bologna, then relocated to University of Parma as an instructor of geology and mineralogy.

In 1903 he returned to Bologna as a teacher of geology at the Royal School of Engineers ("Regia Scuola d'Applicazione per gli Ingegneri"), and during the following year took on additional duties as an instructor of geology and mineralogy at the Royal School of Agriculture ("Regia Scuola Superiore di Agraria"), also in Bologna. In 1904 Giovanni Capellini appointed Simonelli as curator of the Museo Geologico at the university. During his career, he travelled widely, taking scientific trips throughout Italy, and to Crete, Cephalonia, Podolia, Palestine, Galicia and North Africa.

In 1893 he was the first to identify the remains of prehistoric elephants on Crete, being located in three cave sites near the city of Rethymno. Also on Crete he discovered the remains of prehistoric deer, which he described as Anoglochis cretensis.

The mineral simonellite commemorates his name.

== Published works ==
He was the author of sixty published works that included treatises on the geology of Monte Cetona, fossils of La Verna and the geology of Heraklion, to name a few. He was a founding editor, with Carlo Fornasini, of the journal Rivista italiana di paleontologia.

The following are some of his significant writings:

- Il Monte della Verna e i suoi fossili, 1884.
- Terreni e fossili dell'isola di Pianosa nel mar Tirreno, 1889.
- Dei recenti studi geologici e paleontologici sul territorio senese, 1895.
- Antozoi neogenici del Museo Parmense, 1896.
- Candia : ricordi di escursione, 1897.
- Die marinen Ablagerungen auf Gran Canaria, 1898 (in German, with August Rothpletz).
- Le fosforiti di Terra d'Otranto, 1919
- Cenni sopra alcuni giacimenti fosfatiferi della Galizia, della Podolia e della Palestina, 1919.
