= Oncolite =

Trace fossil

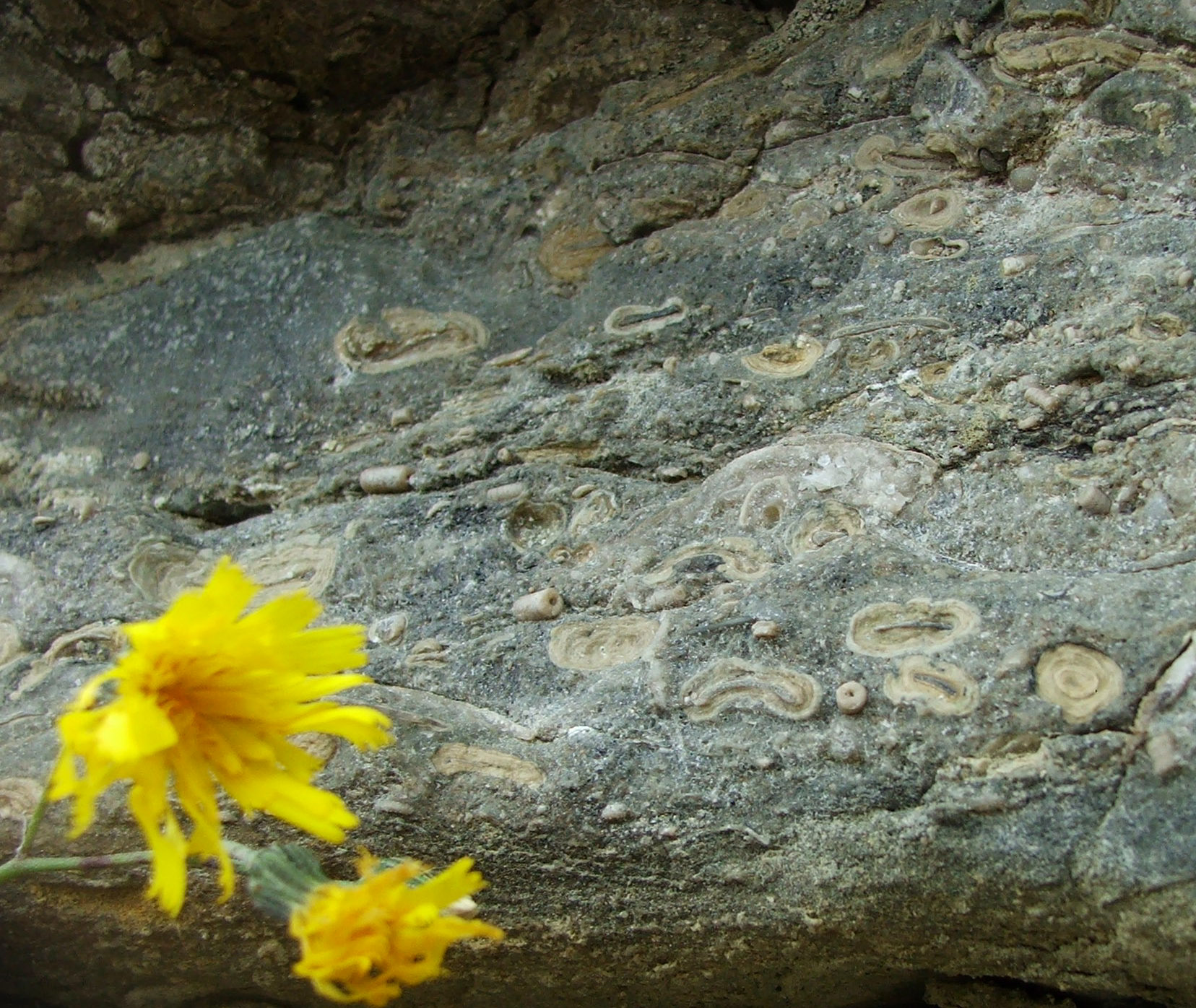
Oncolites from the upper Burgsvik beds (Silurian), with shell fragments as nuclei. The large flower is 2 cm in diameter.

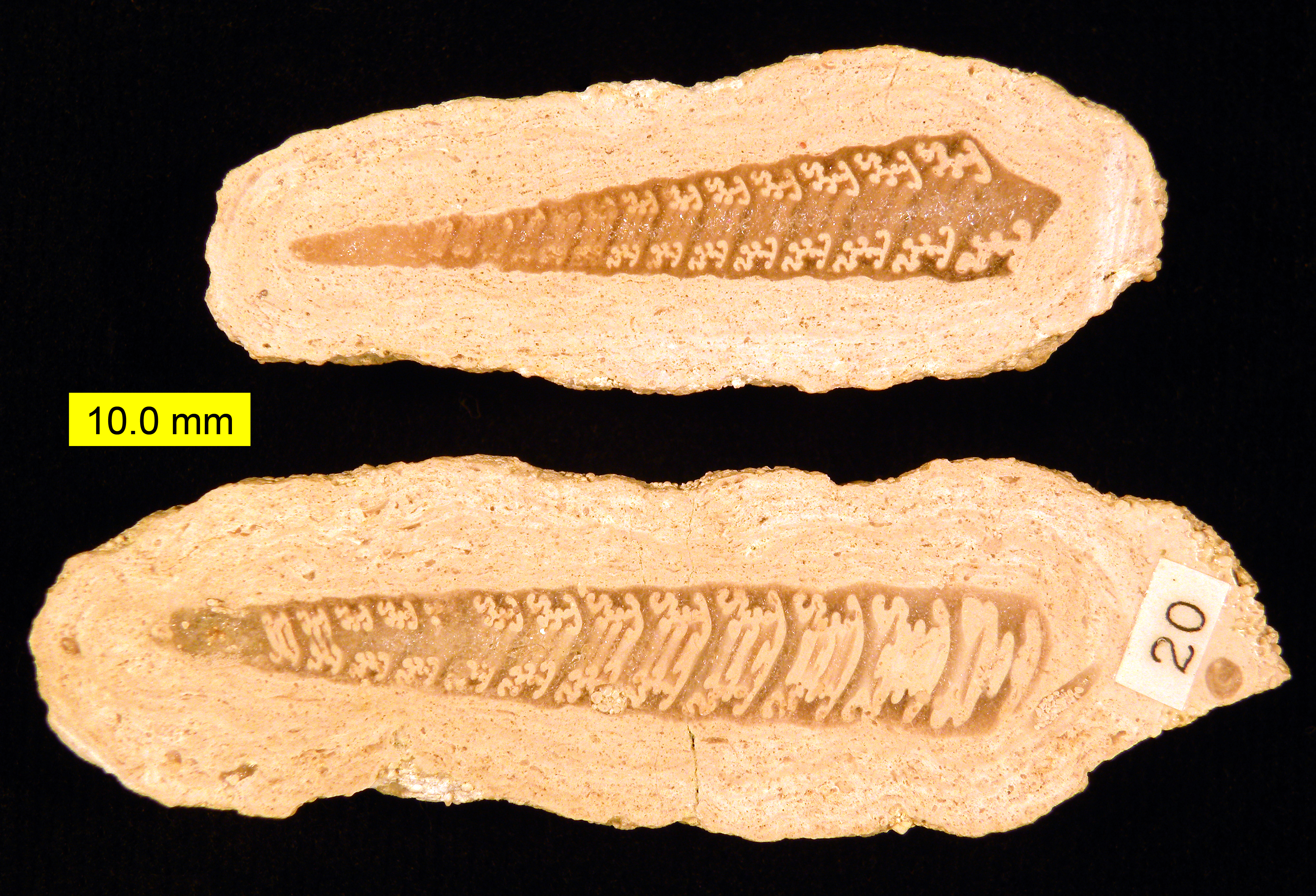
Oncolites formed around the Middle Jurassic gastropod Bactroptyxis trachaea (Normandy, France).

Oncolites are sedimentary structures composed of oncoids, which are layered structures formed by the growth of one or more species of microorganisms, usually containing cyanobacteria. Oncolites are very similar to stromatolites, but, instead of forming columns, they form approximately spherical structures. The oncoids often form around a central nucleus, such as a shell fragment, and a calcium carbonate structure is deposited by encrusting microbes. Oncolites are indicators of warm waters in the photic zone, but are also known in contemporary freshwater environments. These structures rarely exceed 10 cm in diameter.

Oncolites may have either a porostromate or spongiostromate texture. Most oncolites are spongiostromate, having no recognisable cellular texture or microstructure. Porostromate oncolites are mostly unknown during the Precambrian; since the Eocene they have mostly been confined to freshwater environments.

== Distribution ==
The appearance of recent or near-recent freshwater oncoids has been documented in two rivers in Bavaria: the Alz, whose source is the Chiemsee, and the Moosach, near Freising. Modern oncoids also grow in some springs in Atacama Desert in South America. In one particular case a system of oncoids have been observed interface between Salar de Antofalla and an adjacent wetland.
