= Stromatolite =

Layered encrusted sedimentary structure of bacterial origin

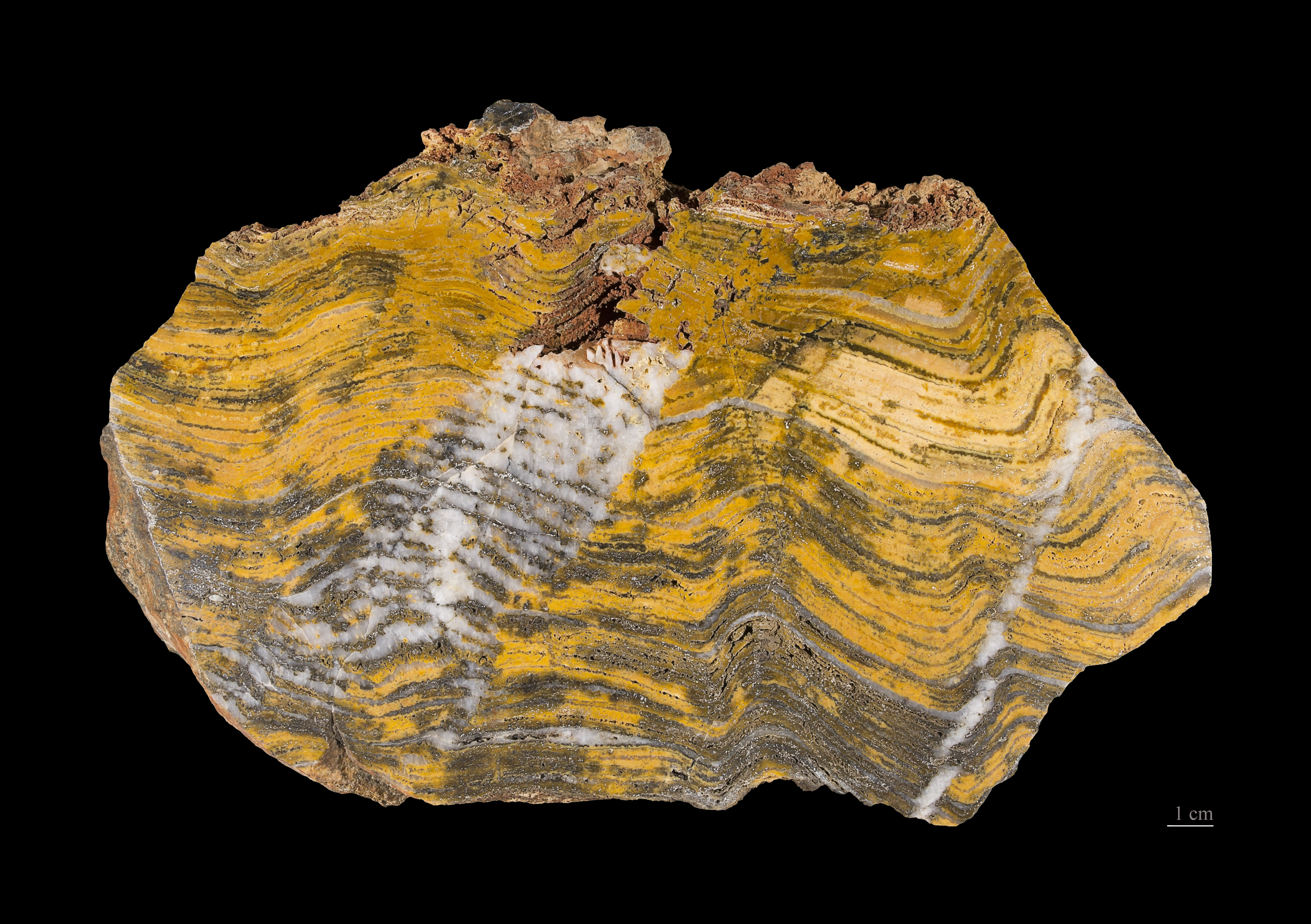
Fossilized stromatolite in Strelley Pool chert, about 3.4 billion years old, from Pilbara Craton, Western Australia

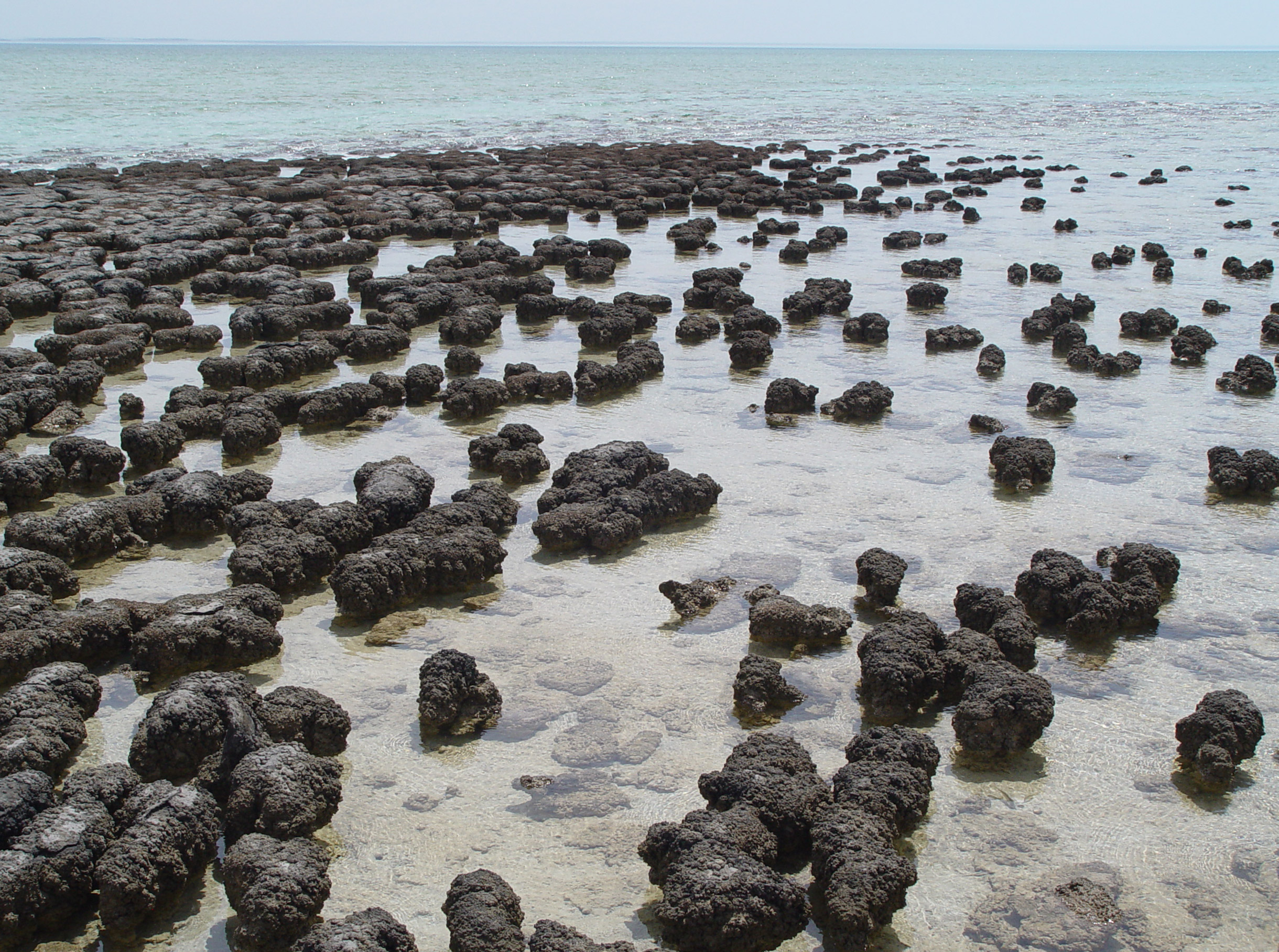
Modern stromatolites in Shark Bay, Western Australia

Stromatolites (/stroʊˈmætəˌlaɪts, strə-/ stroh-MAT-ə-lytes, strə-) or stromatoliths (from Ancient Greek στρῶμα (strôma), GEN στρώματος (strṓmatos) 'layer, stratum' and λίθος (líthos) 'rock') are layered sedimentary formations (microbialite) that are formed mainly by photosynthetic microorganisms such as cyanobacteria, sulfate-reducing bacteria, and Pseudomonadota (formerly proteobacteria). These microorganisms produce adhesive compounds that cement sand and other rocky materials to form mineralized "microbial mats". In turn, these mats build up layer by layer, growing gradually over time.

This process generates the characteristic lamination of stromatolites, a feature that is hard to interpret in terms of its temporal and environmental significance. Different styles of stromatolite lamination have been described, which can be studied through microscopic and mathematical methods. A stromatolite may grow to a meter or more. Fossilized stromatolites provide important records of some of the most ancient life. As of the Holocene, living forms are rare.

== Definition ==
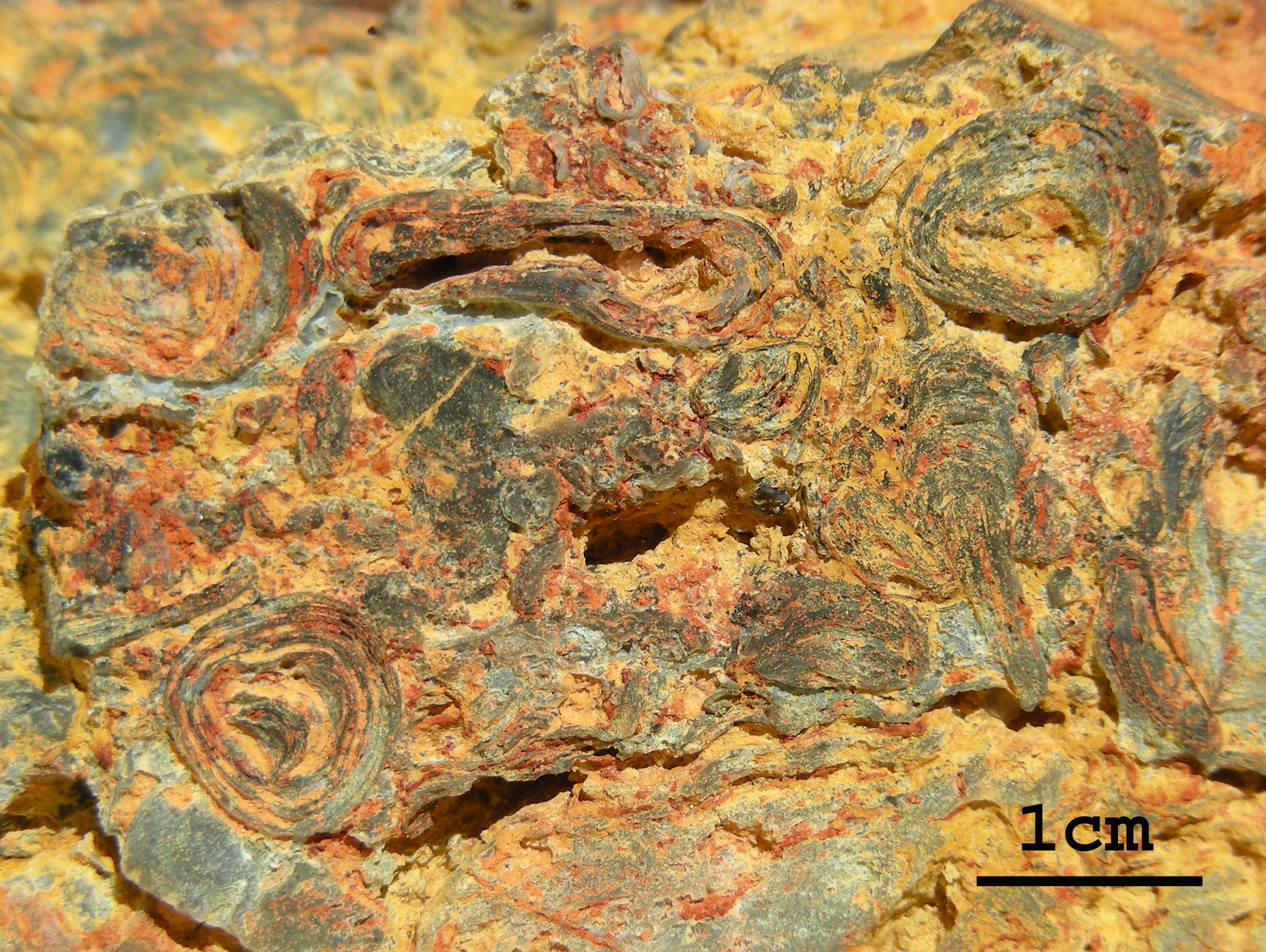
Paleoproterozoic oncoids from the Franceville Basin, Gabon, Central Africa. Oncoids are unfixed stromatolites ranging in size from a few millimeters to a few centimeters

Stromatolites are layered, biochemical, accretionary structures formed in shallow water by the trapping, binding and cementation of sedimentary grains in biofilms (specifically microbial mats), through the action of certain microbial lifeforms, especially cyanobacteria.

The layered nature or laminae of stromatolites distinguishes them from thrombolites which are defined by their clotted, non-layered internal texture. The term "stromatolite" is sometimes confused with the misspelled word "strombolite"—a probable conflation of the closely-related geological terms: stromatolites and thrombolites.

== Ancient stromatolites ==
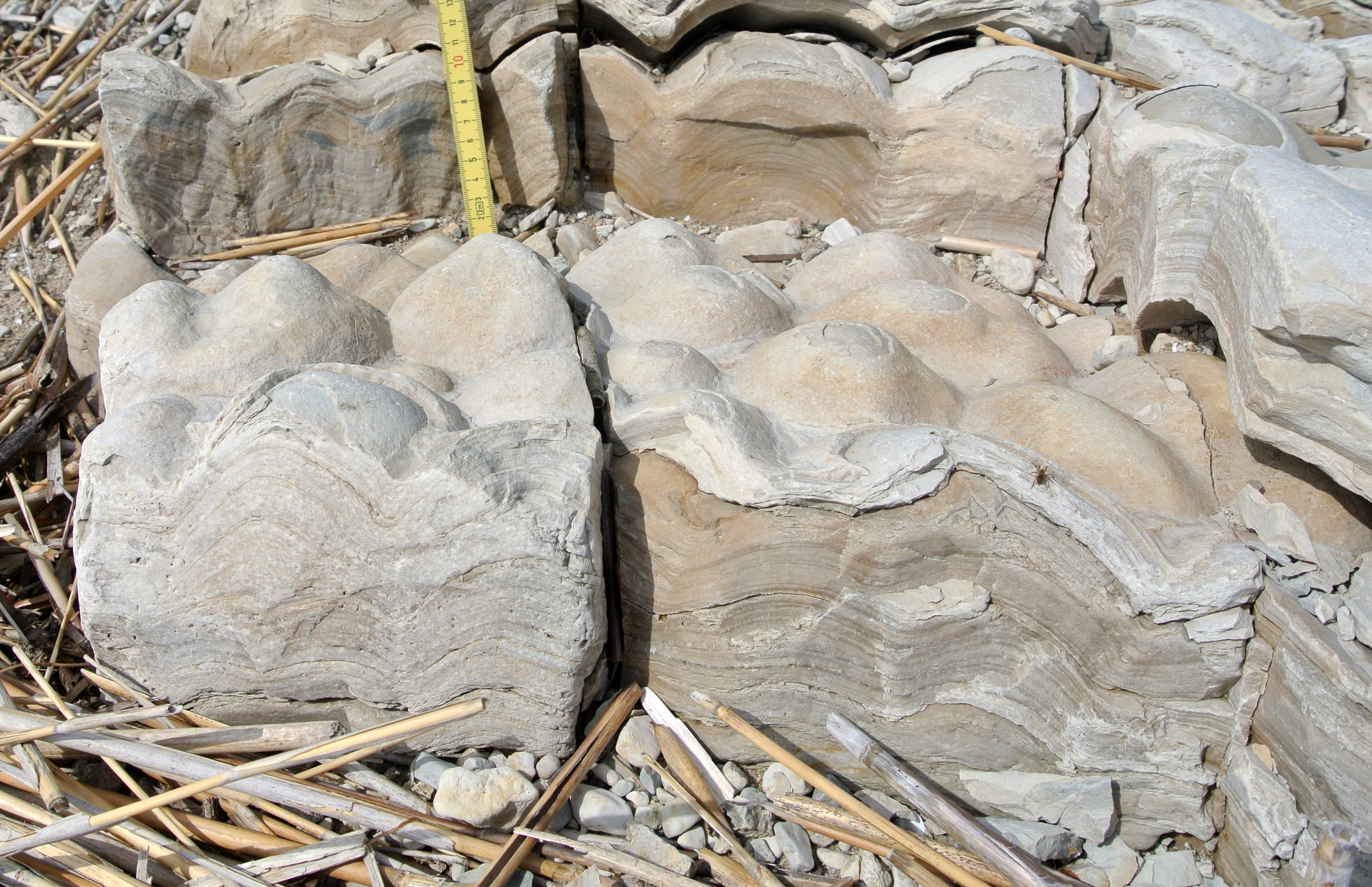
Fossilized stromatolites, about 425 million years old, in the Soeginina Beds (Paadla Formation, Ludlow, Silurian) near Kübassaare, Estonia

=== Morphology ===
Fossilized stromatolites exhibit a variety of forms and structures, or morphologies, including conical, stratiform, domal, columnar, and branching types. Stromatolites occur widely in the fossil record of the Precambrian but are rare today. Very few Archean stromatolites contain fossilized microbes, but fossilized microbes are sometimes abundant in Proterozoic stromatolites.

While features of some ancient apparent stromatolites are suggestive of biological activity, others possess features that are more consistent with abiotic (non-biological) precipitation. Finding reliable ways to distinguish between biologically formed and abiotic stromatolites is an active area of research in geology. Multiple morphologies of stromatolites may exist in a single local or geological stratum, depending on specific conditions at the time of their formation, such as water depth.

Most stromatolites are spongiostromate in texture, having no recognisable microstructure or cellular remains. A minority are porostromate, having recognisable microstructure; these are mostly unknown from the Precambrian but persist throughout the Palaeozoic and Mesozoic. Since the Eocene, porostromate stromatolites are known only from freshwater settings.

=== Fossil record ===
Some Archean rock formations show macroscopic similarity to modern microbial structures, leading to the inference that these structures represent evidence of ancient life, namely stromatolites. However, others regard these patterns as being the result of natural material deposition or some other abiogenic mechanism. Scientists have argued for a biological origin of stromatolites due to the presence of organic globule clusters within the thin layers of the stromatolites, of aragonite nanocrystals (both features of current stromatolites), and of other microstructures in older stromatolites that parallel those in younger stromatolites that show strong indications of biological origin.

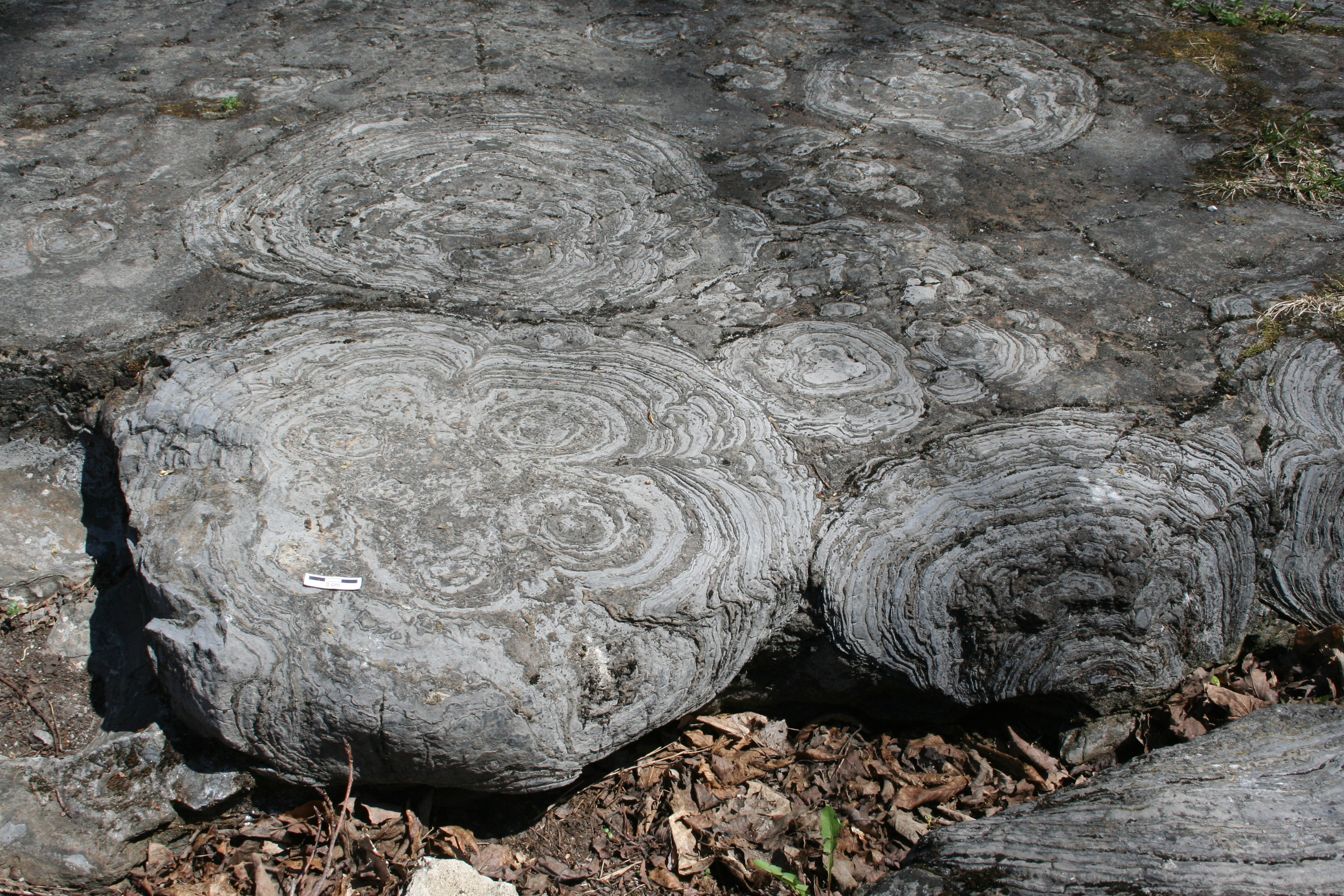
Fossilized stromatolites in the Hoyt Limestone (Cambrian) exposed at Lester Park, near Saratoga Springs, New York

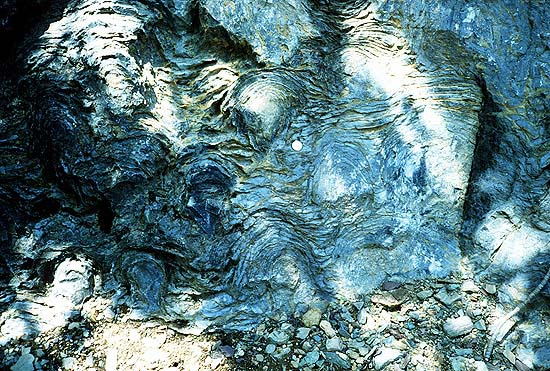
Precambrian fossilized stromatolites in the Siyeh Formation, Glacier National Park

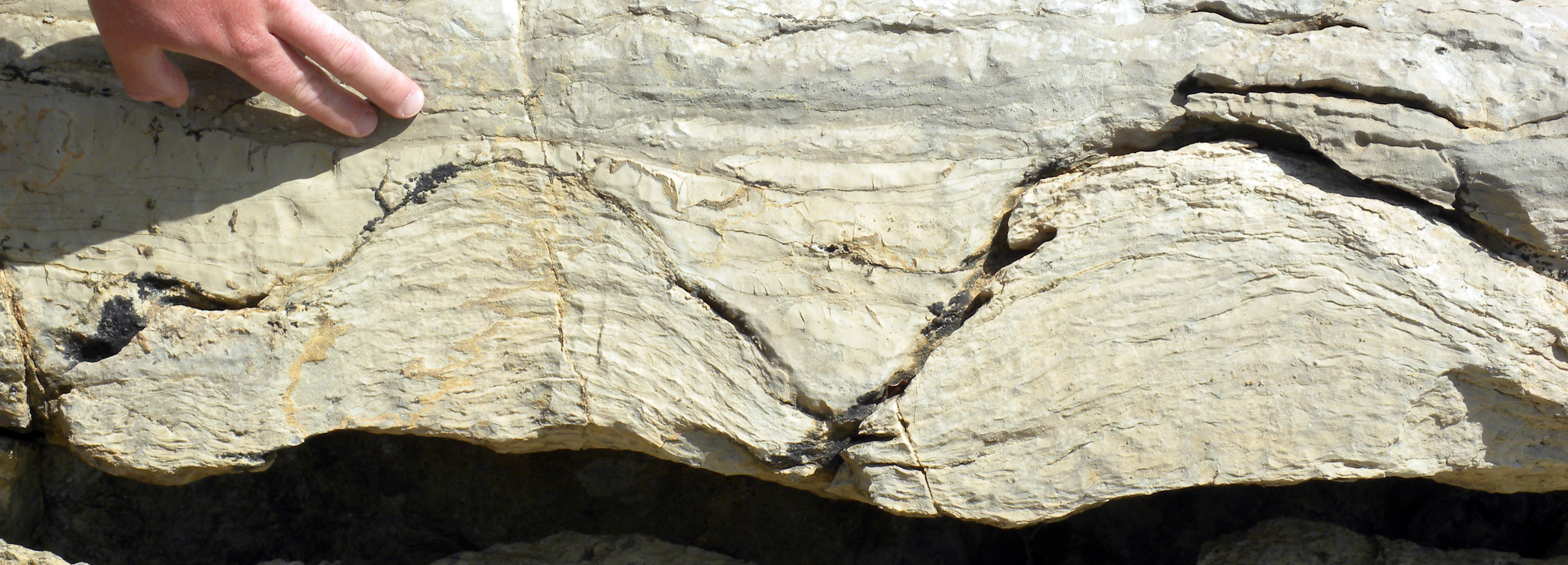
Fossilized stromatolites (Pika Formation, middle Cambrian) near Helen Lake, Banff National Park, Canada

Stromatolites are a major constituent of the fossil record of the first forms of life on Earth. They peaked about 1.25 billion years ago (Ga) and subsequently declined in abundance and diversity, so that by the start of the Cambrian they had fallen to 20% of their peak. The most widely supported explanation is that stromatolite builders fell victim to grazing creatures (the Cambrian substrate revolution); this theory implies that sufficiently complex organisms were common around 1 Ga. Another hypothesis is that protozoa such as foraminifera were responsible for the decline, favoring formation of thrombolites over stromatolites through microscopic bioturbation.

Proterozoic stromatolite microfossils (preserved by permineralization in silica) include cyanobacteria and possibly some forms of the eukaryote chlorophytes (that is, green algae). One genus of stromatolite very common in the geologic record is Collenia.

The connection between grazer and stromatolite abundance is well documented in the younger Ordovician evolutionary radiation; stromatolite abundance also increased after the Late Ordovician mass extinction and Permian–Triassic extinction event decimated marine animals, falling back to earlier levels as marine animals recovered. Fluctuations in metazoan population and diversity may not have been the only factor in the reduction in stromatolite abundance. Factors such as the chemistry of the environment may have been responsible for changes.

While prokaryotic cyanobacteria reproduce asexually through cell division, they were instrumental in priming the environment for the evolutionary development of more complex eukaryotic organisms. They are thought to be largely responsible for increasing the amount of oxygen in the primeval Earth's atmosphere through their continuing photosynthesis (see Great Oxygenation Event). They use water, carbon dioxide, and sunlight to create their food. A layer of polysaccharides often forms over mats of cyanobacterial cells. In modern microbial mats, debris from the surrounding habitat can become trapped within the polysaccharide layer, which can be cemented together by the calcium carbonate to grow thin laminations of limestone. These laminations can accrete over time, resulting in the banded pattern common to stromatolites. The domal morphology of biological stromatolites is the result of the vertical growth necessary for the continued infiltration of sunlight to the organisms for photosynthesis. Layered spherical growth structures termed oncolites are similar to stromatolites and are also known from the fossil record. Thrombolites are poorly laminated or non-laminated clotted structures formed by cyanobacteria, common in the fossil record and in modern sediments. There is evidence that thrombolites form in preference to stromatolites when foraminifera are part of the biological community.

The Zebra River Canyon area of the Kubis platform in the deeply dissected Zaris Mountains of southwestern Namibia provides a well-exposed example of the thrombolite-stromatolite-metazoan reefs that developed during the Proterozoic period, the stromatolites here being better developed in updip locations under conditions of higher current velocities and greater sediment influx.

== Modern occurrence ==
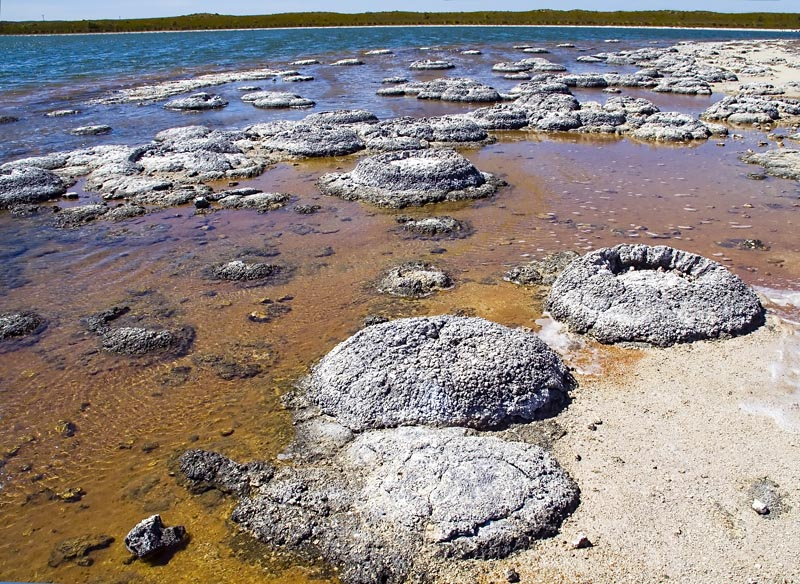
Stromatolites at Lake Thetis, Western Australia

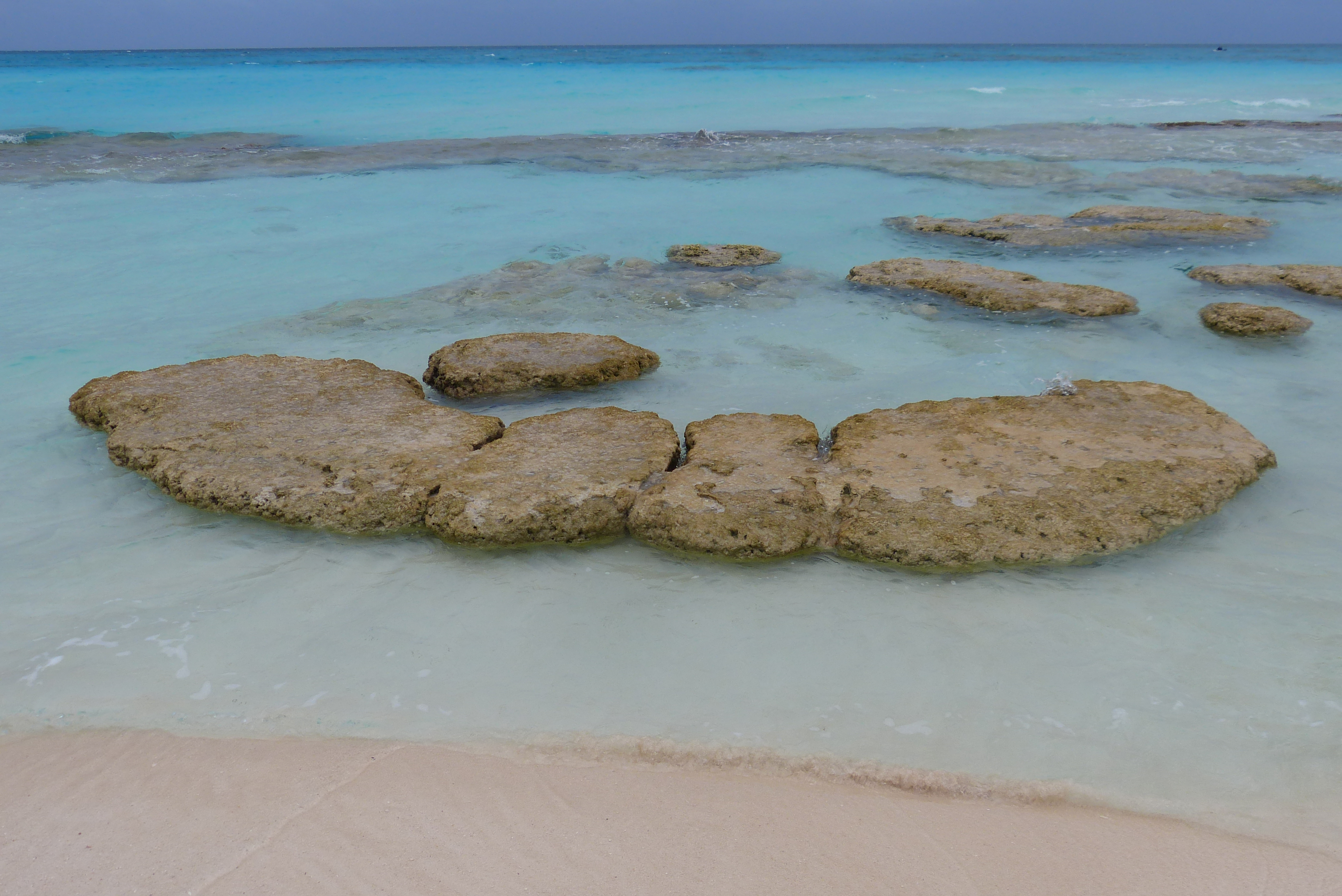
Stromatolites at Highborne Cay, in the Exumas, The Bahamas

=== Formation ===
Time-lapse photography of modern microbial mat formation in a laboratory setting gives some revealing clues to the behavior of cyanobacteria in stromatolites. Biddanda et al. (2015) found that cyanobacteria exposed to localized beams of light moved towards the light, or expressed phototaxis, and increased their photosynthetic yield, which is necessary for survival. In a novel experiment, the scientists projected a school logo onto a petri dish containing the organisms, which accreted beneath the lighted region, forming the logo in bacteria. The authors speculate that such motility allows the cyanobacteria to seek light sources to support the colony.

In both light and dark conditions, the cyanobacteria form clumps that then expand outwards, with individual members remaining connected to the colony via long tendrils. In harsh environments where mechanical forces may tear apart the microbial mats, these substructures may provide evolutionary benefit to the colony, affording it at least some measure of shelter and protection.

Lichen stromatolites are a proposed mechanism of formation of some kinds of layered rock structure that are formed above water, where rock meets air, by repeated colonization of the rock by endolithic lichens.

=== Saline locations ===
Modern stromatolites are mostly found in hypersaline lakes and marine lagoons where high saline levels prevent animal grazing. One such location where excellent modern specimens can be observed is Hamelin Pool Marine Nature Reserve, Shark Bay in Western Australia. In 2010, a fifth type of chlorophyll, namely chlorophyll f, was discovered by Min Chen from stromatolites in Shark Bay. Halococcus hamelinensis, a halophilic archaeon, occurs in living stromatolites in Shark Bay where it is exposed to extreme conditions of UV radiation, salinity and desiccation. H. hamelinensis possesses genes that encode enzymes employed in the repair of UV induced damages in DNA by the processes of nucleotide excision repair and photoreactivation. It can also be found at the Giant’s Causeway in Northern Ireland. A possible reason for stromatolites at this location is because it is an ancient volcanic site with distinct rock formations sitting on the edge of the Irish Sea.

Other locations include Pampa del Tamarugal National Reserve in Chile; Lagoa Salgada, Rio Grande do Norte, Brazil, where modern stromatolites can be observed as both bioherms (domal type) and beds; in the Puna de Atacama of the Andes; and near Sheybarah Island in Saudi Arabia.

Inland stromatolites can be found in saline waters in Cuatro Ciénegas Basin, a unique ecosystem in the Mexican desert. Alchichica Lake in Puebla, Mexico has two distinct morphologic generations of stromatolites: columnar-dome like structures, rich in aragonite, forming near the shore line, dated back to 1,100 years before present (ybp) and spongy-cauliflower like thrombolytic structures that dominate the lake from top to the bottom, mainly composed of hydromagnesite, huntite, calcite and dated back to 2,800 ybp. The only open marine environment where modern stromatolites are known to prosper is the Exuma Cays in the Bahamas.

=== Freshwater locations ===
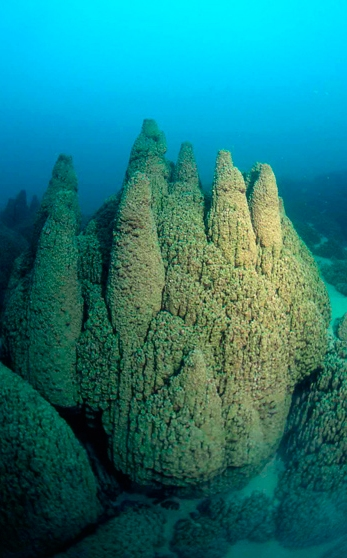
Microbialite towers in Pavilion Lake, British Columbia

Laguna de Bacalar in Mexico's southern Yucatán Peninsula has an extensive formation of living giant microbialites (that is, stromatolites or thrombolites). The microbialite bed is over 10 km (6.2 mi) long with a vertical rise of several meters in some areas. These may be the largest sized living freshwater microbialites on Earth.

A 1.5 km stretch of reef-forming stromatolites (primarily of the genus Scytonema) occurs in Chetumal Bay in Belize, just south of the mouth of the Rio Hondo and the Mexican border. Large microbialite towers up to 40 m high were discovered in the largest soda lake on Earth, Lake Van in eastern Turkey. They are composed of aragonite and grow by precipitation of calcite from sub-lacustrine karst-water. Freshwater stromatolites are found in Lake Salda in southern Turkey. The waters are rich in magnesium and the stromatolite structures are made of hydromagnesite.

Two instances of freshwater stromatolites are found in Canada, at Pavilion Lake and Kelly Lake in British Columbia. Pavilion Lake has the largest known freshwater stromatolites, and NASA has conducted xenobiology research there, called the "Pavilion Lake Research Project." The goal of the project is to better understand what conditions would likely harbor life on other planets.

Microbialites have been discovered in an open pit pond at an abandoned asbestos mine near Clinton Creek, Yukon, Canada. These microbialites are extremely young and presumably began forming soon after the mine closed in 1978. The combination of a low sedimentation rate, high calcification rate, and low microbial growth rate appears to result in the formation of these microbialites. Microbialites at an historic mine site demonstrates that an anthropogenically constructed environment can foster microbial carbonate formation. This has implications for creating artificial environments for building modern microbialites including stromatolites.

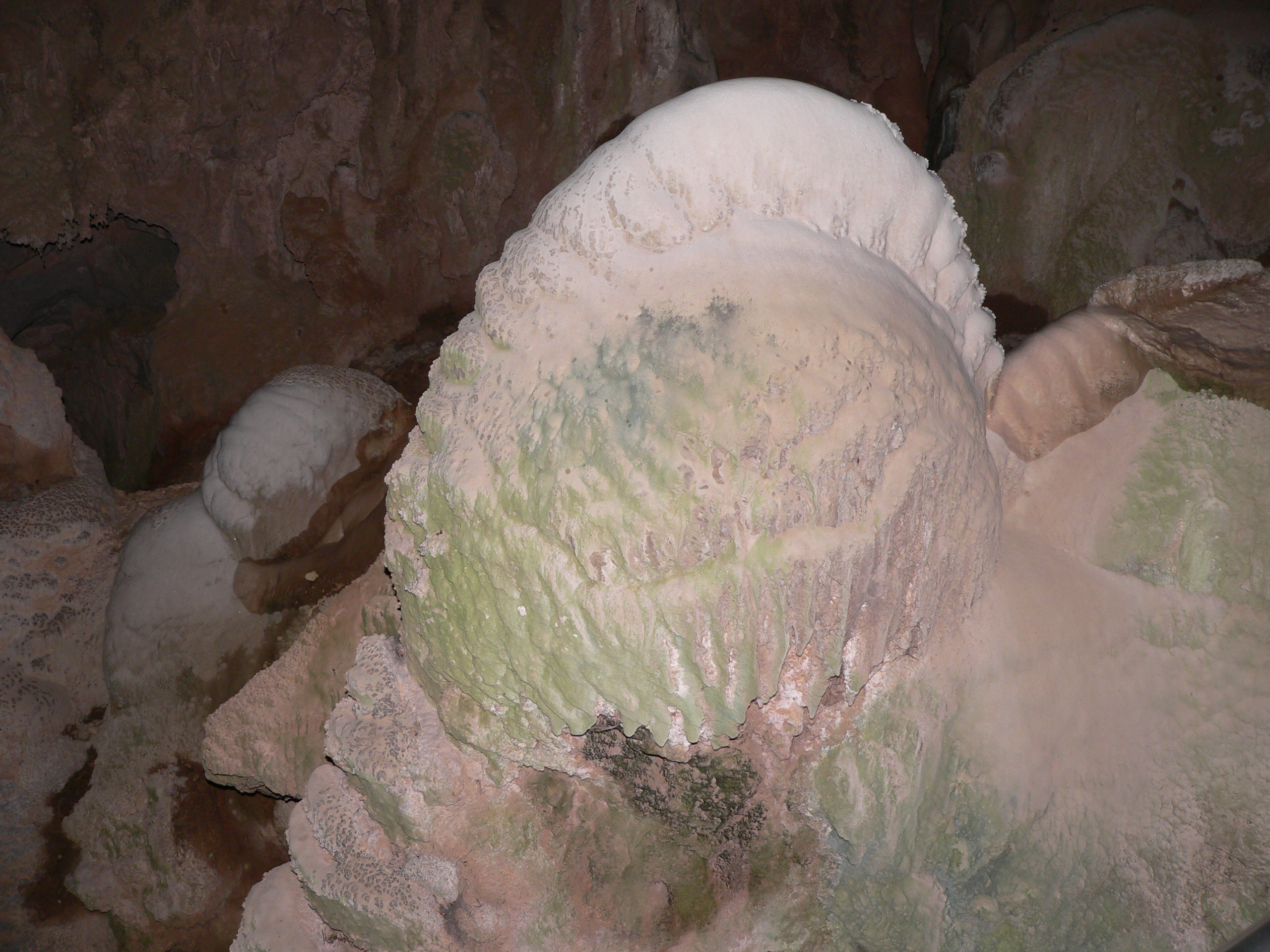
'Crayback' stromatolite – Nettle Cave, Jenolan Caves, NSW, Australia

A very rare type of non-lake dwelling stromatolite lives in the Nettle Cave at Jenolan Caves, NSW, Australia. The cyanobacteria live on the surface of the limestone and are sustained by the calcium-rich dripping water, which allows them to grow toward the two open ends of the cave which provide light.

Stromatolites composed of calcite have been found in both the Blue Lake in the dormant volcano, Mount Gambier and at least eight cenote lakes including the Little Blue Lake in the Lower South-East of South Australia.

== See also ==
- Banded iron formation
- Cotham Marble
- Gunflint Range
- Laguna Negra, Catamarca
- Microbial mat
- Microbialite
- Microbially induced sedimentary structure
- Ojos de Mar
- Thrombolites
