= Spongiostromata =

Trace fossil

"Spongiostromata" is an antiquated form taxon that refers primarily to fossil cyanobacteria. "Spongiostromate" is also used to describe stromatolites and oncolites that do not preserve clear tubules or other cellular microstructure.

Pia (1927) erected the group to contain calcareous algal fossils that contain no visible cellular structure but which he presumed represented cyanobacteria based on comparisons to modern examples. He divided the taxon into two groups: the stromatolithi and the oncolithi.

Monty (1981) abolished the group as taxonomically uninformative but advocated for the use of "spongiostromata" to describe a form and texture of bacterial fossils. He defined a "spongiostromate" texture as follows:

"Spongiostromate microstructures result from the individualization of micritic, spongious, fenestral, sparitic, pelloidal, detrital, etc. laminae or films, variously grouped and organized. "

Throughout geologic history, spongiostromate stromatolites and oncolites have always seemed to vastly outnumber the porostromate forms.
