= Porostromata =

Trace fossil

"Porostromata" is an antiquated form taxon that refers to fossil cyanobacteria. The term porostromate is also used as a descriptor of textures and microstructure of stromatolites and oncolites which contain tubules or other cellular structures.

The group was defined by Pia (1927) as containing calcareous algae bearing calcified tubules; these may run parallel to the growth surface as in Girvanella, Sphaerocodium or perpendicular, as in Hedstroemia, Ortonella, and Mitcheldaenia; however, in 1937 Pia restricted the group to only Girvanella and Sphaerocodium, placing the other genera in the Codiaceae. In reality it seems that most or all of the species included in "Porostromata" represent fossils of cyanobacteria.

Monty (1981) advocated continued use of porostramata in an informal sense to describe a habit and structure of bacterial colonies, rather than in a taxonomic sense. He defined a "porostromate" microstructure as follows:

"Porostromate microstructures are defined by the growth of loose or tangled, vertical, flabellate or flat-lying, straight or sinuous calcified filaments or threads, or even of calcified unicells."

Porostromate stromatolites and oncolites are mostly absent throughout the Proterozoic, with calcified filaments apparently first appearing in the uppermost Precambrian. They then persist throughout the entire Phanerozoic, though from the Eocene and beyond they are only known from freshwater environments.

Stromatolites and oncolites not bearing clear cellular structures are referred to as "spongiostromate"; throughout geologic history they seem to have always vastly outnumbered porostromate forms.
