= Halococcus =

Scientific classification
- Domain: Archaea
- Kingdom: Methanobacteriati
- Phylum: Methanobacteriota
- Class: Halobacteria
- Order: Halobacteriales
- Family: Halococcaceae
- Genus: Halococcus; Schoop 1935

Type species
- Halococcus litoralis (Poulsen 1879) Schoop 1935

Species
- H. agarilyticus; H. dombrowskii; H. hamelinensis; H. morrhuae; H. qingdaonensis; H. saccharolyticus; H. salifodinae; H. salsus; H. sediminicola; H. thailandensis

Genus of archaea

Halococcus (common abbreviation: Hcc.), from Ancient Greek ἅλς (háls), meaning "salt", and κόκκος (kókkos), meaning "berry", is a genus of archaeans in the family Halococcaceae.

== Ecology ==
Halococcus is a genus of extreme halophilic archaea, meaning that they require high salt levels, sometimes as high as 32% NaCl, for optimal growth. Halophiles are found mainly in inland bodies of water with high salinity, where their pigments (from a protein called rhodopsinprotein) tint the sediment bright colors. Rhodopsinprotein and other proteins serve to protect Halococcus from the extreme salinities of their environments. Because they can function under such high-salt conditions, Halococcus and similar halophilic organisms have been used in the food industry and even in skin-care products.

Halococcus is found in environments with high salt levels, mainly inland bodies of salt water, but some may be located in highly salted soil or foods. The pigmented proteins in some species cause the reddish tint found in some areas of the Dead Sea and the Great Salt Lake, especially at the end of the growing season. When under cultivation, the organisms grew best under high salinity conditions.

== Genome structure ==
The genome of multiple halococcus species have been sequenced. The 16s rDNA of a species has demonstrated its placement on the phylogenetic tree. Due to the organisms' potential longevity, Halococcus may be a good candidate for exploring taxonomic similarities to life found in outer space.

== Cell structure and metabolism ==
Halococcus species are able to survive in high-saline habitats because of chlorine pumps that maintain osmotic balance with the salinity of their habitat, and thus prevent dehydration of the cytoplasm.

The cells are cocci, 0.6–1.5 micrometres long with sulfated polysaccharide walls. The cells are organtrophic, using amino acids, organic acids, or carbohydrates for energy. In some cases, they are also able to photosynthesize.

== Phylogeny ==
The currently accepted taxonomy is based on the List of Prokaryotic names with Standing in Nomenclature (LPSN) and National Center for Biotechnology Information (NCBI).

16S rRNA based LTP_07_2026

- Halococcus
  - - - H. hamelinensis Goh et al. 2006
      - H. salsus Chen et al. 2018
    - - H. salifodinae Denner et al. 1994
      - - H. agarilyticus Minegishi et al. 2015
        - H. saccharolyticus Montero et al. 1990
  - - - H. sediminicola Yim et al. 2014
      - H. thailandensis Namwong et al. 2007
    - - H. qingdaonensis Wang et al. 2007
      - - H. dombrowskii Stan-Lotter et al. 2002
        - H. morrhuae (Farlow 1880) Kocur & Hodgkiss 1973

53 marker proteins based GTDB 11-RS232

- Halococcus
  - - H. agarilyticus
    - - H. saccharolyticus
      - H. salifodinae
  - - - H. hamelinensis
      - H. salsus
    - - H. sediminicola
      - - H. qingdaonensis
        - - H. morrhuae [incl. H. dombrowskii]
          - H. thailandensis

== See also ==
- List of Archaea genera
