= Wetheredella =

Wetheredella Temporal range: Ordovician–Carboniferous

Scientific classification
- Domain: Eukaryota
- Clade: Sar
- Clade: Rhizaria
- Phylum: Retaria
- Subphylum: Foraminifera (?)
- Class: incertae sedis (?)
- Genus: †Wetheredella; Wood, 1948. taxon inquirendum (possibly not in foraminifera

Type species
- †Wetheredella silurica Wood, 1948

Species
- †Wetheredella giganta Bao, 1992; †Wetheredella minuta Bao, 1992; †Wetheredella multiformis Ischenko in Ischenko & Radionova, 1981; †Wetheredella? munneckei Vachard & Cózar, 2010; †Wetheredella nodosum Talent 1963; †Wetheredella pusilla Shuysky in Shuysky & Patrunov, 1991; †Wetheredella silurica Wood, 1948; †Wetheredella tenuis Radionova in Ischenko & Radionova, 1981, orth. corr. Vachard & Cózar, 2010 (originally tenue); †Wetheredella tumulus Copper, 1976

Synonyms
- †Allonema Ulrich & Bassler, 1904

Extinct genus of single-celled organisms

Wetheredella is a genus of calcimicrobes initially described from the Silurian of England, and subsequently reported from the Upper Ordovician to the end of the Carboniferous periods; its reefs are stated as being characteristic of the Ordovician-Silurian periods. Its taxonomic position is uncertain; it has been suggested to be a foraminiferan, a cyanobacterium or simply treated as a microproblematicum; Vachard & Cózar (2010) refer it to the Algospongia, a similarly controversial group that they assigned to the Protista but later, per Vachard, 2021, to Algae incertae sedis, in its own family (Wetheredellidae or Wetheredellaceae) and suborder (Wetheredellina) in the order Moravamminida (= Moravamminales). The genus is named in honor of the geologist Edward Wethered.

Wetheredella is characterized by calcified tubes encrusting a foreign body, with convex outer surfaces and inner surfaces coiled around the encrusted grain. Recently it has been shown that structures matching the description of Wetheredella can be produced by sectioning of Allomena, meaning that Wetheredella is possibly a junior synonym of Allomena.
