= Rothpletzella =

Rothpletzella Temporal range: 516.0–155.7 Ma

Scientific classification
- Domain: Bacteria
- Kingdom: Bacillati
- Phylum: Cyanobacteriota
- Class: incertae sedis
- Genus: †Rothpletzella; Wood, 1948

Type species
- Sphaerocodium gotlandicum Rothpletz, 1908

Species
- †R. gotlandica (Rothpletz) Wood, 1948; †R. longita Liu, Wu, Yang & Riding, 2016; †R. munthei (Rothpletz) Wood, 1948; †R. straeleni (Lecomte, 1939)

Synonyms
- Coactilum Maslov, 1956

Extinct genus of bacteria

Rothpletzella is a genus of calcimicrobe known from the Silurian of Gotland, the Devonian of France, as well as the Ordovician of China. It has been hypothesised to be a cyanobacterium, and shares morphological similarities with extant cyanobacteria. The genus is named in honor of August Rothpletz.
