= Michele Gortani =

Italian geographer, geologist and politician (1883–1966)

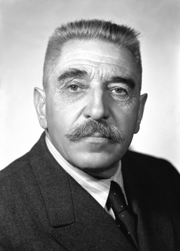

Michele Gortani (16 January 1883 – 24 January 1966) was an Italian geologist, entomologist, and politician. He was a specialist on the Carnic Alps where he grew up and worked for much of his life.

Gortani was born in Friuli to engineer Luigi and Angela Grassi in Lugo, Spain where his father then worked. He was educated at Udine before joining Bologna University, graduating in 1904. He was keenly interested in the Alpine region of Carnia, taking an interest in flora, paleontology, and entomology. He published on the fossils of Carnia while still a student in 1902. He worked as a geological assistant at Perrugia University in 1905 and at Bologna from 1906 to 1910, and Turin (1911–1913). He married Maria Gentile Mencucci from Zuglio in 1911. He became a professor at Pisa University in 1913 and also became a deputy in the Italian parliament in the same year. He volunteered in the Alpini (Alpine troops) during World War I and was court-martialled for criticising the Italian Army command for their poor planning. He was involved in helping refugees in the Carnia following their invasion in 1917. In 1922 he was made chair of geology at the University of Cagliari. He studied the limestone fauna at Bellerophon and published extensively. He also examined cave faunas in the region. He published on the beetles of the region. He studied Paleozoic fossils from the Karakoram and in 1936–1938 went on expeditions to the Italian colonial regions of Ethiopia and Eritrea. He published a textbook of geology Compendio di geologia (1946–1948). He served as a member of the Christian Democratic Party in the Italian Assembly from 1948 to 1953 and was instrumental in the production of geological map of Italy (which was completed in 1970). He helped establish the Museo delle Arti e delle Tradizioni Popolari Carniche. He died at Tolmezzo.
