= August Rothpletz =

German geologist and paleontologist

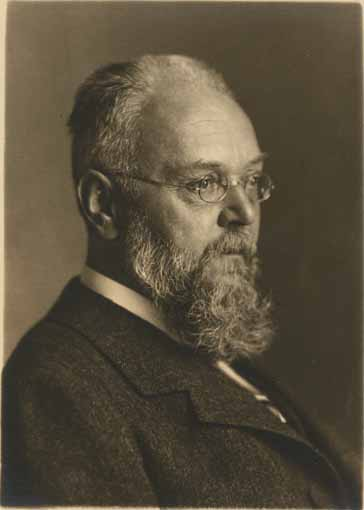
August Rothpletz

Friedrich August Rothpletz (28 April 1853 in Neustadt an der Haardt – 27 January 1918 in Oberstdorf) was a German geologist and paleontologist.

== Biography ==
From 1875 to 1880, Rothpletz conducted geological mapping in Saxony as part of the Sächsischen Geologischen Landesanstalt (Saxon Geological Survey), afterwards receiving his doctorate from Leipzig University (1882). Two years later, he obtained his habilitation at the Ludwig-Maximilians-Universität München, where he taught classes in geology, Alpine tectonics and paleobotany. In 1894 he became an associate professor and in 1904 succeeded Karl von Zittel as professor of geology and paleontology at the Ludwig-Maximilians-Universität München. From 1904 to 1918, he was director of the Bayerische Staatssammlung für Paläontologie und Geologie (Bavarian Geological-Paleontological State Collections).

He performed research on a wide array of subjects, that included studies on the structure of calcareous algae and the folding of rocks in mountain ranges. He was particularly interested in geological problems associated with the Alps, publishing two important works as a result, Geotektonische Probleme (1894) and Geologische Alpenforschungen (1900–08). He also studied marine geological formations of the Canary Islands, publishing the treatise Die marinen Ablagerungen auf Gran Canaria (1890), in collaboration with Victor Simonelli.

He was a foreign correspondent of the Geological Society of London (from 1894), becoming a foreign member in 1903. In 1948 the calcimicrobe genus Rothpletzella was named in his honor.

== Selected works ==
- Das Karwendelgebirge, 1888 – The Karwendel Mountains.
- Ein geologischer Querschnitt durch die Ost-Alpen, 1894 – A geological cross section of the eastern Alps.
- Geotektonische Probleme, 1894 – Geotectonic problems.
- Das Geotektonische Problem Der Glarner Alpen, 1898 – The geotectonic problem of the Glarus Alps
- Geologische Alpenforschungen (Geological Alpine investigations):
  - I. Das Grenzgebiet zwischen den Ost- und West-Alpen und die rhaetische Ueberschiebung. 1900 – The border between the Eastern and Western Alps and the Rhaetian overthrusting.
  - II. Ausdehnung und Herkunft der rhaetischen Schubmasse. 1905 – Origin and expansion of the Rhaetian thrust mass.
  - III. Die Nord- ind Süd-Ueberschiebungen in den Freiburger Alpen. 1908 – The north and south overthrusts in the Fribourg Alps.
