= Halococcaceae =

Scientific classification
- Domain: Archaea
- Kingdom: Methanobacteriati
- Phylum: Methanobacteriota
- Class: Halobacteria
- Order: Halobacteriales
- Family: Halococcaceae; Gupta et al. 2016

Genus
- Halococcus

Family in the order Halobacteriales

Halococcaceae, from Ancient Greek ἅλς (háls), meaning "salt", and κόκκος (kókkos), meaning "berry", is a family of halophilic and mostly chemoorganotrophic archaea within the order Halobacteriales. The type genus of this family is Halococcus. Its biochemical characteristics are the same as the order Halobacteriales.

The name Halococcaceae is derived from the Latin term Halococcus, referring to the type genus of the family and the suffix "-ceae", an ending used to denote a family. Together, Halococcaceae refers to a family whose nomenclatural type is the genus Halococcus.

== Current Taxonomy and Molecular Signatures ==
As of 2021, Halococcaceae contains a single validly published genus, Halococcus. This family can be molecularly distinguished from other Halobacteria by the presence of 23 conserved signature proteins (CSPs) and nine conserved signature indels (CSIs) present in the following proteins: DNA gyrase subunit B, chaperone protein DnaK, HAD-superfamily hydrolase, glycosyltransferase, 2-Succinyl-6-hydroxy-2,4-cyclohexadiene-1-carboxylate synthase, iron-regulated ABC transporter, glycine dehydrogenase subunit 2, GMP synthase and a hypothetical protein.

== See also ==
- List of Archaea genera
