= Virgin Hills Formation =

Geological formation in Western Australia

- Stratigraphic range: Late Devonian (Frasnian to Famennian) 382.31–358.86 Ma
- Type: Geological formation
- Unit of: Fairfield Group
- Underlies: Bugle Gap Limestone, Piker Hills Formation
- Overlies: Gogo Formation, Sadler Limestone

Lithology
- Primary: Limestone
- Other: Sandstone

Location
- Location: Kimberley, Western Australia
- Coordinates: 18.734°S 126.087°E (Casey Falls)
- Region: Western Australia
- Country: Australia
- Extent: Canning Basin
- Virgin Hills Formation (Australia) Virgin Hills Formation (Western Australia)

The Virgin Hills Formation is a geologic formation dating to the Late Devonian epoch, specifically the Frasnian and Famennian stages. It is located in the Kimberley of Western Australia. The formation represents inter-reef facies deposited as a section of an extensive reef system that fringed the south-west Kimberley Block of what is now Western Australia. Its rocks record a wide range of animals, particularly ammonoids, conodonts and trilobites, and it additionally records the Kellwasser extinction event at the Frasnian–Famennian border, showcasing the disappearance of much of the indigenous life, before their replacement by newcomers from outside the Canning Basin.

== Biochronology and Stratigraphy ==
=== Conodont Zones ===
Each species is sorted into time-correlated conodont zones, which is a common method of establishing specific biostratigraphic zones in many formations. As seen in the table below, the zones with only number codes are Frasnian in age, and the ones with only conodont species names are Famennian in age, although both do have conodont names.

- McWhae Ridge
  - Eastern
    - Calyx Corner (13b)
    - Casey Falls (WCB 357) (southeastern) (13b–rhomboidea)
    - Phacopid Gully (13a, 13b)
    - Scutelluid Bed (12)
    - Berigora Gully (12)
    - Esko's Gully (12)
  - Western
    - Cheiloceras Bed (rhomboidea)
    - Frutexites Bed (Lower–Middle crepida)
    - Upper Beloceras Bed (13a)
    - Lower Beloceras Bed (12)
- Bugle Gap (11)
  - Windy Knolls (WCB 369) (11–13a)
- Horse Spring (WCB 364) (6–11, 12, 13b)
- Siphon Spring (12)

One should not tie conodont zones to localities as indivisible units, and instead as two separate parts that are used together. This is because, first, some localities, such as Horse Spring in zones 6–11, 12, and 13b, skipping 13a, can occur in non-contiguous conodont zones. Second, as mentioned before, conodont zones are time-based and are used globally, while the localities are stratigraphically based and specific to the Virgin Hills Formation. If in the Localities column and a cell for example says 'McWhae Ridge (Base, etc.,)', that means one of the localities is an unspecified part of the McWhae area. This also applies if it simply says 'McWhae Ridge' without any specific localities, and this also applies to Bugle Gap, which has the locality 'Windy Knolls', and can also be referred to without a specified locality. It should also be noted that the Casey Falls locality occurs within both Virgin Hills and the overlying Bugle Gap Limestone (not to be confused with the Bugle Gap locality of the Virgin Hills Formation).

=== Ammonoid Zones and Correlation ===
In regard to ammonoids, they have been designated to a more precise biochronological order in the form of zones and subzones, most of which are named after one of the ammonoids found there, although many of them are not endemic to that particular zone. This spans the entire Canning Basin, including the Napier and Gogo Formations, but in the Virgin Hills Formation the zones begin at UD I-E1 (UD standing for Upper Devonian, though it is optimal to omit this part) and conclude at III-C. These have been mapped to conodont zones, making it possible to convert ammonoid zones to conodont zones. However, vice versa is not fully possible, as conodont zones are generally broader and can span multiple ammonoid zones. Note that [ur] means low diversity upper range zone, which is defined by the extinction of several species. A collapsed table below displays this biostratigraphical mapping.

Correlation of Ammonoid and Conodont Zonation (Canning Basin)
Stage	Substage	German Ages	Key	Ammonoid Zones	Ammonoid Subzones	Conodont Zones	
Famennian	Upper	Hembergian	III-C	Protactoclymenia euryomphala	N/A	trachytera Zone	
Famennian	Upper	Hembergian	III-B3	Falcitornoceras sp. M [ur]	N/A	trachytera Zone	
Famennian	Upper	Hembergian	III-B3	Falcitornoceras sp. M [ur]	N/A	Uppermost marginifera Zone	
Famennian	Upper	Hembergian	III-B2	Pseudoclymenia australis	Pseudoclymenia australis	Uppermost marginifera Zone	
Famennian	Upper	Hembergian	III-B1	Pseudoclymenia australis	Sporadoceras angustisellatum	Uppermost marginifera Zone	
Famennian	Upper	Hembergian	III-A2	Sporadoceras equale	Pernoceras delepinei	Upper marginifera Zone	
Famennian	Middle	Hembergian	III-A1	Sporadoceras equale	Sporadoceras equale	Upper marginifera Zone	
Famennian	Middle	Nehdenian	II-I2	Dimeroceras sp.	Cycloclymenia sp.	Upper marginifera Zone	
Famennian	Middle	Nehdenian	II-I1	Dimeroceras sp.	Dimeroceras sp.	Upper marginifera Zone	
Famennian	Middle	Nehdenian	II-H	Sporadoceras teicherti	N/A	Upper marginifera Zone	
Famennian	Middle	Nehdenian	II-G2	Maeneceras meridionale	Maeneceras latilobatum	Lower marginifera Zone	
Famennian	Middle	Nehdenian	II-G1	Maeneceras meridionale	Maeneceras meridionale	Lower marginifera Zone	
Famennian	Middle	Nehdenian	II-F2	Paratornoceras polonicum	Acrimeroceras clarkei	Lower marginifera Zone	
Famennian	Lower	Nehdenian	II-F1	Paratornoceras polonicum	Paratornoceras polonicum	rhomboidea Zone	
Famennian	Lower	Nehdenian	II-E2	Praemeroceras petterae	Praemeroceras primaevum	rhomboidea Zone	
Famennian	Lower	Nehdenian	II-E1	Praemeroceras petterae	Praemeroceras petterae	rhomboidea Zone	
Famennian	Lower	Nehdenian	II-D	Oxytornoceras sp.	N/A	Uppermost crepida–Lower rhomboidea Zone	
Famennian	Lower	Nehdenian	II-C	"Falcitornoceras" sp. 1	N/A	Upper crepida Zone	
Famennian	Lower	Nehdenian	II-B	"Falcitornoceras" sp. 1	N/A	Middle crepida Zone	
Famennian	Lower	Nehdenian	II-A	[no ammonoids; extinction]	N/A	triangularis–Lower crepida Zones	
Frasnian	Upper	Adorfian	I-L2	Crickites lindneri	Manticoceras cordatum [ur]	Zone 13c	linguiformis
Frasnian	Upper	Adorfian	I-L1b	Crickites lindneri	“Manticoceras“ guppyi	Zone 13b	linguiformis
Frasnian	Upper	Adorfian	I-L1a	Crickites lindneri	Crickites lindneri	Zone 13a	Upper rhenana
Frasnian	Upper	Adorfian	I-K	Manticoceras sp. 5	N/A	Zone 13a	Upper rhenana
Frasnian	Upper	Adorfian	I-J3	Maternoceras retorquatum	Clauseniceras sp.	Zone 12	Lower rhenana
Frasnian	Upper	Adorfian	I-J2	Maternoceras retorquatum	Virginoceras erraticum	Zone 12	Lower rhenana
Frasnian	Upper	Adorfian	I-J1	Maternoceras retorquatum	Maternoceras retorquatum	Zone 12	Lower rhenana
Frasnian	Upper	Adorfian	I-J1	Maternoceras retorquatum	Maternoceras retorquatum	Zone 11	Lower rhenana
Frasnian	Upper	Adorfian	I-I2	Playfordites tripartitus	N/A	Zone 11	Lower rhenana
Frasnian	Upper	Adorfian	I-I1	Costamanticoceras koeneni	N/A	Zone 11	jamieae
Frasnian	Middle	Adorfian	I-H	Beloceras tenuistriatum	N/A	Zones 9–10	Upper hassi
Frasnian	Middle	Adorfian	I-G2b	Mesobeloceras thomasi	N/A	Zone 8	Lower hassi
Frasnian	Middle	Adorfian	I-G2a	Mesobeloceras housei	N/A	Zone 7	Lower hassi
Frasnian	Middle	Adorfian	I-G1	Naplesites naplense Gp.	N/A	Zone 6	punctata
Frasnian	Middle	Adorfian	I-F3	Sphaeromanticoceras affine	N/A	Zone 6	punctata
Frasnian	Middle	Adorfian	I-F2	Gogoceras nicolli	N/A	Zone 5	punctata
Frasnian	Middle	Adorfian	I-F1	Prochorites alveolatus	N/A	Zone 5	punctata
Frasnian	Middle	Adorfian	I-E3	Manticoceras sp. 1	N/A	Zone 5	punctata
Frasnian	Middle	Adorfian	I-E2	Ponticeras discoidale	N/A	Zone 5	punctata
Frasnian	Middle	Adorfian	I-E1	Probeloceras lutheri lutheri	N/A	Zone 5	punctata

== Ammonoidea ==
=== Agoniatitida ===
==== Acanthoclymeniidae ====
Acanthoclymeniid ammonoids of the Virgin Hills Formation
Genus	Species	Localities	Ammonoid Zone	Conodont Zone	Images
Acanthoclymenia	A. neapolitana	West of McIntyre Knoll (WCB 367)	I-F1–I-F2	5	
Probeloceras	P. lutheri lutheri	McPhee Knoll (WCB 365)	I-E1–I-E3	5	
Probeloceras	P. lutheri ssp.		I-E3	5	
Probeloceras	P. aff. lutheri	West of McIntyre Knoll (WCB 367)	I-F1	5	
Probeloceras	gen. aff. P. sp.	West of McIntyre Knoll (WCB 367)	I-F2	5	
Prochorites	P. alveolatus	West of McIntyre Knoll (WCB 367)	I-F1–I-F2	5	

==== Beloceratidae ====
Beloceratid ammonoids of the Virgin Hills Formation
Genus	Species	Localities	Ammonoid Zone	Conodont Zone	Images
Beloceras	B. tenuistriatum	Casey Falls (WCB 357); Horse Spring (WCB 364); McWhae Ridge (WCB 371A); McWhae Ridge (WCB 371B); McWhae Ridge Trench (WCB 372); McWhae Ridge (Mesobeloceras Section)	I-H–I-L1b	9–13b	Fossil specimen of Beloceras sagittarium.
Beloceras	B. tenuistriatum glenisteri		I-I2	11	
Mesobeloceras	M. housei	East of McPhee Knoll (WCB 366)	I-G2a	7	
Mesobeloceras	M. thomasi	Horse Spring (WCB 364); McWhae Ridge Trench (WCB 372); McWhae Ridge (Mesobeloceras Section)	I-G2b–I-J3	8–12	
Naplesites	N. naplense		I-G1	6	
Naplesites	N. sp.		I-G1	6	

==== Gephuroceratidae ====
Gephuroceratid ammonoids of the Virgin Hills Formation
Genus	Species	Localities	Ammonoid Zone	Conodont Zone	Images
Archoceras	A. varicosum		I-L1b	13b	
Carinoceras	C. vagans		I-G2b	8	
Clauseniceras	C. scheldense		I-J2–I-J3	12	
Clauseniceras	C. cf. expectatum	McWhae Ridge (WCB 371B)	I-J2	12	
Clauseniceras	C. sp.		I-J3	12	
Costamanticoceras	C. koeneni	Bugle Gap (Windy Knolls (WCB 369))	I-I1–I-J2	11–12	
Costamanticoceras	C. tuberculatum	McWhae Ridge (WCB 371A)	I-J1	11–12	
Costamanticoceras	C. sp.		I-G2b–I-J2	8–12	
Crickites	C. lindneri	Bugle Gap (Windy Knolls (WCB 369)); McWhae Ridge (WCB 371B); McWhae Ridge (Graben Section)	I-L1a–I-L1b	13a–13b	
Manticoceras	M. cordatum	McPhee Knoll (WCB 365); McWhae Ridge (WCB 371B)	I-E1, I-J2, I-L2	5, 12, 13c	Fossil (USNM 617549) of M. evolutum.
Manticoceras	M. evolutum	Horse Spring (WCB 364)	I-H	9–10	Fossil (USNM 617549) of M. evolutum.
Manticoceras	"M." guppyi	Casey Falls (WCB 357); Horse Spring (WCB 364); McWhae Ridge (WCB 371B); McWhae Ridge (Graben Section)	I-L1b–I-L2	13b–13c	Fossil (USNM 617549) of M. evolutum.
Manticoceras	M. lamed	Casey Falls (WCB 357); Near Horse Spring (WCB 364); McPhee Knoll (WCB 365); East of McPhee Knoll (WCB 366); McWhae Ridge (WCB 371B); McWhae Ridge Trench (WCB 372)	I-E1–I-K	5–13a	Fossil (USNM 617549) of M. evolutum.
Manticoceras	M. rugosum	McWhae Ridge (WCB 371A); McWhae Ridge (WCB 371B)	I-J1–I-J2	11–12	Fossil (USNM 617549) of M. evolutum.
Manticoceras	M. sp. 1	West of McIntyre Knoll (WCB 367)	I-E3–I-F3	5–6	Fossil (USNM 617549) of M. evolutum.
Manticoceras	M. sp. 2		I-F2–I-I1	5–11	Fossil (USNM 617549) of M. evolutum.
Manticoceras	M. sp. 3		I-F2	5	Fossil (USNM 617549) of M. evolutum.
Manticoceras	M. sp. 4	Flare Hill	I-K–I-L1a	13a	Fossil (USNM 617549) of M. evolutum.
Manticoceras	M. sp. 5		I-K	13a	Fossil (USNM 617549) of M. evolutum.
Maternoceras	M. retorquatum	McWhae Ridge (WCB 371A); McWhae Ridge (WCB 371B)	I-I1–I-J2	11–12	
Maternoceras	M. sandbergi		I-J3	12	
Maternoceras	M. sp. 1	East of McPhee Knoll (WCB 366)	I-F3	6	
Mixomanticoceras	M. exploratum	McPhee Knoll (WCB 365)	I-E1	5	
Playfordites	P. tripartitus	Horse Spring (WCB 364); McWhae Ridge (WCB 371); McWhae Ridge Trench (WCB 372)	I-I2–I-J1	11–12	
Playfordites	P. sp.		I-G2b	8	
Serramanticoceras	S. obliquesulcatum		I-J2	12	
Serramanticoceras	S. serratum	Near Horse Spring (WCB 364); McWhae Ridge (WCB 371B); McWhae Ridge Trench (WCB 372)	I-I1–I-J3	11–12	
Serramanticoceras	S. sp. 1		I-I2, I-J3	11–12	
Sphaeromanticoceras	S. affine	East of McPhee Knoll (WCB 366)	I-F3–I-J2	6–12	
Trimanticoceras	T. bullatum	McWhae Ridge (WCB 371A); McWhae Ridge (WCB 371B)	I-J1–I-J3	11–12	
Trimanticoceras	T. cinctum	Near Horse Spring (WCB 364); McWhae Ridge (WCB 371B)	I-J2–I-L1a	12–13a	
Trimanticoceras	T. aff. cinctum	McWhae Ridge (WCB 371A)	I-I2–I-J3	11–12	
Trimanticoceras	T. sp. A		I-L1a	13a	
Trimanticoceras	T. sp. B		I-J2	12	
Trimanticoceras	T. sp. C		I-L1b	13b	
Virginoceras	V. erraticum	McWhae Ridge (WCB 371B)	I-J2	12	

==== Ponticeratidae ====
Ponticeratid ammonoids of the Virgin Hills Formation
Genus	Species	Localities	Ammonoid Zone	Conodont Zone	Images
Gogoceras	G. nicolli	West of McIntyre Knoll (WCB 367)	I-F2	5	
Gogoceras	G. sp. A	McPhee Knoll (WCB 365)	I-E3	5	
Gogoceras	G. sp. B	West of McIntyre Knoll (WCB 367)	I-F1	5	
Ponticeras	P. discoidale	McPhee Knoll (WCB 365); West of McIntyre Knoll (WCB 367)	I-E2–I-F2	5	
Ponticeras	P. sp.	McPhee Knoll (WCB 365)	I-E1	5	

=== Goniatitida ===
==== Cheiloceratidae ====
Cheiloceratid ammonoids of the Virgin Hills Formation
Genus	Species	Localities	Ammonoid Zone	Conodont Zone	Images
Cheiloceras	Cheiloceras (Staffites) curvispina		II-D–II-E1	Uppermost crepida–rhomboidea	
Cheiloceras	Cheiloceras (Puncticeras) lagowiense		II-D	Uppermost crepida–Lower rhomboidea	Fossil specimen of Cheiloceras sp.
Cheiloceras	C. (P.) pompekji (Formerly, in part, C. (Staffites) ovatum)		II-B–II-E1	Middle crepida–rhomboidea	Fossil specimen of Cheiloceras sp.
Cheiloceras	C. (P.) postinversum (Formerly, in part, C. (C.) sacculus; compressed forms only)		II-D–II-F2	Uppermost crepida–Lower marginifera	Fossil specimen of Cheiloceras sp.
Cheiloceras	C. (P.) semiinversum		II-D–II-F1	Uppermost crepida–rhomboidea	Fossil specimen of Cheiloceras sp.
Cheiloceras	C. (P.) schmidti (Formerly C. (Staffites) schmidti)		II-D	Uppermost crepida–Lower rhomboidea	Fossil specimen of Cheiloceras sp.
Praemeroceras	P. globosoides		II-E1–II-F1	Lower–Upper rhomboidea	
Praemeroceras	P. petterae (Formerly Dimeroceras petterae)		II-E1–II-F1	Lower–Upper rhomboidea	
Praemeroceras	P. primaevum (Formerly Dimeroceras padbergense)	WAPET C	II-E2–II-F1	Upper rhomboidea	
Torleyoceras	T. oxyacantha		II-D	Uppermost crepida–Upper marginifera	

==== Dimeroceratidae ====
Dimeroceratid ammonoids of the Virgin Hills Formation
Genus	Species	Localities	Ammonoid Zone	Conodont Zone	Images
Dimeroceras	D. sp.	Casey Falls (WCB 357)	II-I1–III-A1	Upper marginifera	
Paratornoceras	P. lentiforme		II-F1	Upper rhomboidea	
Paratornoceras	P. polonicum		II-F1	Upper rhomboidea	
Acrimeroceras	A. clarkei	WAPET C	II-F2	Lower marginifera	

==== Kirsoceratidae ====
Kirsoceratid ammonoids of the Virgin Hills Formation
Genus	Species	Localities	Ammonoid Zone	Conodont Zone	Images
Pernoceras	P. delepinei (Formerly Polonoceras delepinei)		III-A2–III-B1	Upper–Uppermost marginifera	
Pernoceras	P. sp.		III-B2	Uppermost marginifera	
Protornoceras	P. cf. simplicius		III-A1	Upper marginifera	

==== Phenacoceratidae ====
Phenacoceratid ammonoids of the Virgin Hills Formation
Genus	Species	Localities	Ammonoid Zone	Conodont Zone	Images
Cycloclymenia	C. sp.	Casey Falls (WCB 357)	II-I2	Upper marginifera	

==== Pseudoclymeniidae ====
Pseudoclymeniid ammonoids of the Virgin Hills Formation
Genus	Species	Localities	Ammonoid Zone	Conodont Zone	Images
Pseudoclymenia	P. australis		III-B2	Uppermost marginifera	

==== Posttornoceratidae ====
Posttornoceratid ammonoids of the Virgin Hills Formation
Genus	Species	Localities	Ammonoid Zone	Conodont Zone	Images
Posttornoceras	P. glenisteri		II-H–III-B1	Upper–Uppermost marginifera	

==== Prolobitidae ====
Prolobitid ammonoids of the Virgin Hills Formation
Genus	Species	Localities	Ammonoid Zone	Conodont Zone	Images
Prolobitid gen sp.	indet. sp.		III-C	trachytera	

==== Sporadoceratidae ====
Sporadoceratid ammonoids of the Virgin Hills Formation
Genus	Species	Localities	Ammonoid Zone	Conodont Zone	Images
Maeneceras	M. latilobatum (Formerly Sporadoceras (S.) latilobatum)		II-G2–II-H	Lower marginifera–Upper marginifera	
Maeneceras	M. meridionale (Formerly Sporadoceras biferum)		II-G1–III-B2	Lower marginifera–Uppermost marginifera	
Maeneceras	M. milleri	Syncline Gully	II-H–II-I2	Upper marginifera	
Sporadoceras	S. angustisellatum (Formerly, in part, S. posthumum)		III-B1–III-C	Uppermost marginifera–trachytera	
Sporadoceras	S. equale (Formerly S. (S.) muensteri)	Casey Falls (WCB 357)	III-A1–III-A2	Upper marginifera	
Sporadoceras	S. teicherti		II-H–III-B1	Upper–Uppermost marginifera	

==== Tornoceratidae ====
Tornoceratid ammonoids of the Virgin Hills Formation
Genus	Species	Localities	Ammonoid Zone	Conodont Zone	Images
Aulatornoceras	A. auris		I-I1	11	
Aulatornoceras	A. eifliense		I-F3–I-J2	6–12	
Aulatornoceras	A. sp.		I-K	13a	
Armatites	A. planidorsatus		II-D–II-I2	Uppermost crepida–Upper marginifera	Paleoart reconstruction of A. kaufmanni.
Falcitornoceras	"F." sp. 1		II-B–II-C	Middle–Upper crepida	
Falcitornoceras	"F." sp. 2		II-B–II-C	Middle–Upper crepida	
Falcitornoceras	"F." sp. 3		II-D	Uppermost crepida–Lower rhomboidea	
Falcitornoceras	F. sp. M		III-B2–III-C	Uppermost marginifera–trachytera	
Linguatornoceras	L. clausum	McWhae Ridge (WCB 371A); McWhae Ridge (WCB 371B)	I-I1–I-L1b	11–13b	
Linguatornoceras	L. aff. clausum	East of McPhee Knoll (WCB 366)	I-F1–I-G1	5–6	
Linguatornoceras	L. sp.		II-D	Uppermost crepida–Lower rhomboidea	
Oxytornoceras	O. sp. (Formerly Epitornoceras peracutum)	Casey Falls (WCB 357)	II-D	Uppermost crepida–Lower rhomboidea	
Planitornoceras	P. euryomphalum		III-B2	Uppermost marginifera	

=== Clymeniida ===
==== Cyrtoclymeniidae ====
Cyrtoclymeniidae ammonoids of the Virgin Hills Formation
Genus	Species	Localities	Ammonoid Zone	Conodont Zone	Images
Protactoclymenia	P. euryomphala	WAPET H	III-C	trachytera	

== Conodonts ==
=== Conodonts ===
Conodonts of the Virgin Hills Formation
Genus	Species	Localities	Conodont Zone	Clade	Images
Acodina	cf. A. sp. A.		Lower crepida–trachytera	incertae sedis	
Ancyrodella	A. buckeyensis	Horse Spring (WCB 364)	11–13b	Ozarkodinida, Polygnathidae	
Ancyrodella	A. curvata (early form)	Horse Spring (WCB 364)	6–11	Ozarkodinida, Polygnathidae	
Ancyrodella	A. curvata (late form)	Horse Spring (WCB 364)	11–13c	Ozarkodinida, Polygnathidae	
Ancyrodella	A. gigas form 1	Horse Spring (WCB 364)	6–7	Ozarkodinida, Polygnathidae	
Ancyrodella	A. gigas form 2	Horse Spring (WCB 364); West of McPhee Knoll (WCB 365)	6	Ozarkodinida, Polygnathidae	
Ancyrodella	A. gigas form 3	Horse Spring (WCB 364)	10–11	Ozarkodinida, Polygnathidae	
Ancyrodella	A. ioides	Horse Spring (WCB 364); Windy Knolls (WCB 369); McWhae Ridge Trench (WCB 372)	12	Ozarkodinida, Polygnathidae	
Ancyrodella	A. lobata	Horse Spring (WCB 364)	7–10	Ozarkodinida, Polygnathidae	
Ancyrodella	A. aff. ioides	Horse Spring (WCB 364)	13a–13b	Ozarkodinida, Polygnathidae	
Ancyrodella	A. sp.	Horse Spring (WCB 364)	13b	Ozarkodinida, Polygnathidae	
Ancyrognathus	A. ancyrognathoideus	Horse Spring (WCB 364)	6	Ozarkodinida, Polygnathidae	
Ancyrognathus	A. asymmetricus	Horse Spring (WCB 364)	13a	Ozarkodinida, Polygnathidae	
Ancyrognathus	A. barba	Horse Spring (WCB 364)	8	Ozarkodinida, Polygnathidae	
Ancyrognathus	A. coeni	Horse Spring (WCB 364)	8–11	Ozarkodinida, Polygnathidae	
Ancyrognathus	A. deformis group	Horse Spring (WCB 364)	8–11	Ozarkodinida, Polygnathidae	
Ancyrognathus	A. iowaensis	Horse Spring (WCB 364)	11	Ozarkodinida, Polygnathidae	
Ancyrognathus	A. primus	Horse Spring (WCB 364)	6–7	Ozarkodinida, Polygnathidae	
Ancyrognathus	A. triangularis	Horse Spring (WCB 364)	11–12	Ozarkodinida, Polygnathidae	
Ancyrognathus	A. tsiensi	Horse Spring (WCB 364)	8–11	Ozarkodinida, Polygnathidae	
Ancyrognathus	A. aff. ?A. sp. 1	Horse Spring (WCB 364)	11	Ozarkodinida, Polygnathidae	
Ancyrognathus	A. sp.	Horse Spring (WCB 364)	10	Ozarkodinida, Polygnathidae	
Ancyrognathus	A. sp. indet.	Horse Spring (WCB 364)	11–13a	Ozarkodinida, Polygnathidae	
Belodella	B. sp.	Horse Spring (WCB 364)	6, 11–13c	Belodellida, Belodellidae	
Hindeodella	H. corpulenta		Lower marginifera		
Hindeodella	H. subtilis		Lower marginifera		
Hindeodella	H. sp.		Lower marginifera		
Icriodus	I. alternatus	Horse Spring (WCB 364)	11–13b, Lower triangularis	Prioniodinida, Icriodontidae	
Icriodus	I. symmetricus	Horse Spring (WCB 364)	6–11, 13a	Prioniodinida, Icriodontidae	
Ligodina	L. sp.		Lower marginifera		
Mehlina	M. sp.	Horse Spring (WCB 364)	10–11	Ozarkodinida, Polygnathidae	
Mesotaxis	M. ovalis	Horse Spring (WCB 364)	6	Ozarkodinida, Palmatolepidae	
Neoprioniodus	N. armatus-alatus group		Lower marginifera		
Nothognathella	N. palmatiformis		Lower marginifera		
Nothognathella	N. sp.		Lower marginifera		
Ozarkodina	O. bidentatiformis	Horse Spring (WCB 364)	6	Ozarkodinida, Spathognathodontidae	
Ozarkodina	O. immersa		Lower marginifera	Ozarkodinida, Spathognathodontidae	
Ozarkodina	O. macra		Lower marginifera	Ozarkodinida, Spathognathodontidae	
Ozarkodina	O. nonaginta	Horse Spring (WCB 364); East of McPhee Knoll (WCB 366); McWhae Ridge Trench (WCB 372)	6–7	Ozarkodinida, Spathognathodontidae	
Ozarkodina	?O. sp.	Horse Spring (WCB 364)	11	Ozarkodinida, Spathognathodontidae	
Ozarkodina	O. sp.		Lower marginifera	Ozarkodinida, Spathognathodontidae	
Ozarkodina	cf. ? O. lacera		Lower marginifera	Ozarkodinida, Spathognathodontidae	
Palmatolepis	P. glabra pectinata		Lower marginifera	Ozarkodinida, Palmatolepidae	
Palmatolepis	P. minuta minuta		Lower marginifera	Ozarkodinida, Palmatolepidae	
Palmatolepis	P. quadrantinodosa inflexa		Lower marginifera	Ozarkodinida, Palmatolepidae	
Palmatolepis	P. quadrantinodosa inflexoidea		Lower marginifera	Ozarkodinida, Palmatolepidae	
Polygnathus	P. glaber glaber		Lower marginifera	Ozarkodinida, Polygnathidae	
Polygnathus	P. germanus germanus		Lower marginifera	Ozarkodinida, Polygnathidae	
Polygnathus	P. triphyllatus		Lower marginifera	Ozarkodinida, Polygnathidae	
Prioniodina	?P. smithi		Lower marginifera	Prioniodinida, Prioniodinidae	
Scutula	cf. S. bipennata		Lower marginifera		
Tripodellus	T. robustus		Lower marginifera	Ozarkodinida, Palmatolepidae	

== Trilobita ==
=== Harpetida ===
==== Harpetidae ====
Harpetid trilobites of the Virgin Hills Formation
Genus	Species	Localities	Conodont Zone	Images
Eskoharpes	E. boltoni	McWhae Ridge (Berigora Gully)	12	Harpides sp., a related species.
Eskoharpes	E. guthae	McWhae Ridge (Phacopid Gully)	13a	Harpides sp., a related species.
Eskoharpes	E. palanasus	McWhae Ridge (Calyx Corner, Phacopid Gully)	13a–13b	Harpides sp., a related species.
Eskoharpes	E. wandjina	McWhae Ridge (Berigora Gully, Esko's Gully)	12	Harpides sp., a related species.
Globoharpes	G. teicherti	McWhae Ridge (Berigora Gully)	12	
Globoharpes	G. friendi	McWhae Ridge (Berigora Gully, Esko's Gully)	12	
Globoharpes	G. aff. teicherti	McWhae Ridge (Berigora Gully)	12	

=== Odontopleurida ===
==== Odontopleuridae ====
Odontopleurid trilobites of the Virgin Hills Formation
Genus	Species	Localities	Conodont Zone	Images
Gondwanaspis	G. dracula	Bugle Gap; McWhae Ridge	11–12	The related Isoprusia sp.
Gondwanaspis	G. spinosa	Bugle Gap; McWhae Ridge	11–12	The related Isoprusia sp.
Gondwanaspis	G. sp. A	Bugle Gap	11	The related Isoprusia sp.
Gondwanaspis	G. sp. B	McWhae Ridge	13b	The related Isoprusia sp.
Gondwanaspis	G. sp. C	McWhae Ridge	13b	

=== Phacopida ===
==== Phacopidae ====
Phacopid trilobites of the Virgin Hills Formation
Genus	Species	Localities	Conodont Zone	Images
Acuticryphops	A. acuticeps	McWhae Ridge (western side Base; Phacopid Gully)	13a	Mould of A. acuticeps.
Acuticryphops	A. klapperi	McWhae Ridge (Calyx Corner, Phacopid Gully)	13b	
Babinops	B. planiventer	Ant Hill	Upper crepida–rhomboidea	
Babinops	B. minor	McWhae Ridge (Base, Casey Falls (WCB 357))	Upper crepida–rhomboidea	
Houseops	H. beckeri	McWhae Ridge	Upper triangularis	
Houseops	H. canningensis	McWhae Ridge	Lower–Middle crepida	
Houseops	H. sp. A	McWhae Ridge	Upper triangularis	
Trimerocephaloides	T. sinevisus	Bugle Gap (Windy Knolls (WCB 369))	13a	
Trimerocephaloides	T. (?) linguiformis	Bugle Gap (Windy Knolls (WCB 369)); Harpetid Bed	11	
Trimerocephalus	T. tardispinosus	Sprite Ridge	rhomboidea	
Trimerocephalus	T. mimbi	McWhae Ridge	rhomboidea	

=== Proetida ===
==== Aulacopleuridae ====
Aulacopleurid trilobites of the Virgin Hills Formation
Genus	Species	Localities	Conodont Zone	Images
Otarion	O. fugitivum	McWhae Ridge (Phacopid Gully)	13b	Fossil of the family namesake, Aulacopleura konicki
Otarion	O. sp.	Siphon Spring	12	Fossil of the family namesake, Aulacopleura konicki

==== Proetidae ====
Proetid trilobites of the Virgin Hills Formation
Genus	Species	Localities	Conodont Zone	Images
Canningbole	C. henwoodorum	Siphon Spring	12	Fossil of Liobole glabra, a fellow proetid.
Canningbole	C. latimargo	Horse Spring; McWhae Ridge (Calyx Corner, Casey Falls (WCB 357), Phacopid Gully)	13b	Fossil of Liobole glabra, a fellow proetid.
Canningbole	C. macromma	Horse Spring	11–12	Fossil of Liobole glabra, a fellow proetid.
Canningbole	C. sp. aff. macromma	Horse Spring	11–12	Fossil of Liobole glabra, a fellow proetid.
Cyrtosymbole	C. playfordi	Sprite Ridge	rhomboidea	
Palpebralia	P. initialis	Bugle Gap (Windy Knolls (WCB 369))	11	
Palpebralia	P. pustulata	McWhae Ridge (Lower Beloceras Bed)	12	
Palpebralia	?P. sp. A	McWhae Ridge (Calyx Corner)	13b	
Palpebralina	P. pseudopalpebralis pseudopalpebralis	Bugle Gap (Windy Knolls (WCB 369)); McWhae Ridge (Phacopid Gully)	13a	
Palpebralina	P. pseudopalpebralis ultima	McWhae Ridge (Calyx Corner)	13b	
Palpebralina	P. minor	McWhae Ridge (Lower Beloceras Bed, Berigora Gully)	12	
Palpebralina	P. ocellifer	Bugle Gap (Windy Knolls (WCB 369))	12	
Rudybole	R. adorfensis angusta	Bugle Gap (Windy Knolls (WCB 369)); Horse Spring	11–12	
Rudybole	R. brecciae	McWhae Ridge (Calyx Corner, Phacopid Gully)	13b	
Rudybole	R. depressa	McWhae Ridge (Calyx Corner, Casey Falls (WCB 357), Phacopid Gully)	13b	

==== Tropidocoryphidae ====
Tropidocoryphid trilobites of the Virgin Hills Formation
Genus	Species	Localities	Conodont Zone	Images
Chlupaciparia	C. (C.) planiops	Bugle Gap (Windy Knolls (WCB 369))	13a	Fossil of the tropidocoryphid Diademaproetus sp.
Chlupaciparia	C. (Australoparia) australis	Bugle Gap (Windy Knolls (WCB 369))	12	Fossil of the tropidocoryphid Diademaproetus sp.
Chlupaciparia	C. (A.) lata	Siphon Spring	12	Fossil of the tropidocoryphid Diademaproetus sp.
Pteroparia	P. extrema	Bugle Gap (Windy Knolls (WCB 369)); McWhae Ridge (Lower Beloceras Bed, Berigora Gully)	12	

=== Corynexochida ===
==== Styginidae ====
Styginid trilobites of the Virgin Hills Formation
Genus	Species	Localities	Conodont Zone	Images
Telopeltis	T. intermedia	McWhae Ridge (Base, Phacopid Gully)	13a	Prepared fossil specimen of Scutellum sp.
Telopeltis	T. microphthalmus	McWhae Ridge (Calyx Corner & Phacopid Gully)	13a–13b	Prepared fossil specimen of Scutellum sp.
Telopeltis	T. woodwardi	Bugle Gap; Horse Spring; McWhae Ridge (Base, Berigora Gully, Scutelluid Bed); Siphon Spring	11–12	Prepared fossil specimen of Scutellum sp.
Telopeltis	T. aff. intermedia	McWhae Ridge	13a	Prepared fossil specimen of Scutellum sp.
Telopeltis	T. aff. woodwardi	McWhae Ridge; (Scutelluid Bed)	12	Prepared fossil specimen of Scutellum sp.

== Vertebrates ==
=== Vertebrates ===
Vertebrates of the Virgin Hills Formation
Genus	Species	Localities	Conodont Zone	Clade	Images
Australolepis	A. seddoni	Horse Spring	10–11	Thelodontiformes, Turiniidae	
Cladodoides	C. wildungensis	Casey Falls (WCB 357); Horse Spring	11–Lower crepida	Ctenacanthiformes, Ctenacanthidae	Fossils of C. wildungensis.
Deihim	D. mansureae	Casey Falls (WCB 357)	Upper marginifera–?Tournaisian	Elasmobranchii, Protacrodontidae	
Diademodus	D. dominicus	Horse Spring	11	Phoebodontiformes, Phoebodontidae	Reconstruction of D. hydei.
Lissodus	L. lusavorichi	Casey Falls (WCB 357)	Upper marginifera	Hybodontiformes, Lonchidiidae	
Phoebodus	P. bifurcatus	Horse Spring	11	Phoebodontiformes, Phoebodontidae	Reconstruction of P. saidselachus.
Phoebodus	P. fastigatus	Horse Spring	6–11	Phoebodontiformes, Phoebodontidae	Reconstruction of P. saidselachus.
Phoebodus	P. latus	Horse Spring	9–11	Phoebodontiformes, Phoebodontidae	Reconstruction of P. saidselachus.
Phoebodus	P. cf. fastigatus	Horse Spring	N/A	Phoebodontiformes, Phoebodontidae	Reconstruction of P. saidselachus.
Phoebodus	P. sp. 1	Horse Spring	N/A	Phoebodontiformes, Phoebodontidae	Reconstruction of P. saidselachus.
Stethacanthus	S. sp. 1	Casey Falls (WCB 357)	N/A	Symmoriiformes, Stethacanthidae	
Thrinacodus	T. tranquillus	Casey Falls (WCB 357)	Upper marginifera	Phoebodontiformes, Phoebodontidae	
Westralichthys	W. uwagedensis	N/A (Not recorded, most likely Virgin Hills)	Lower marginifera	Arthrodira, Dunkleosteoidea incertae sedis	Reconstruction of W. uwagedensis.
