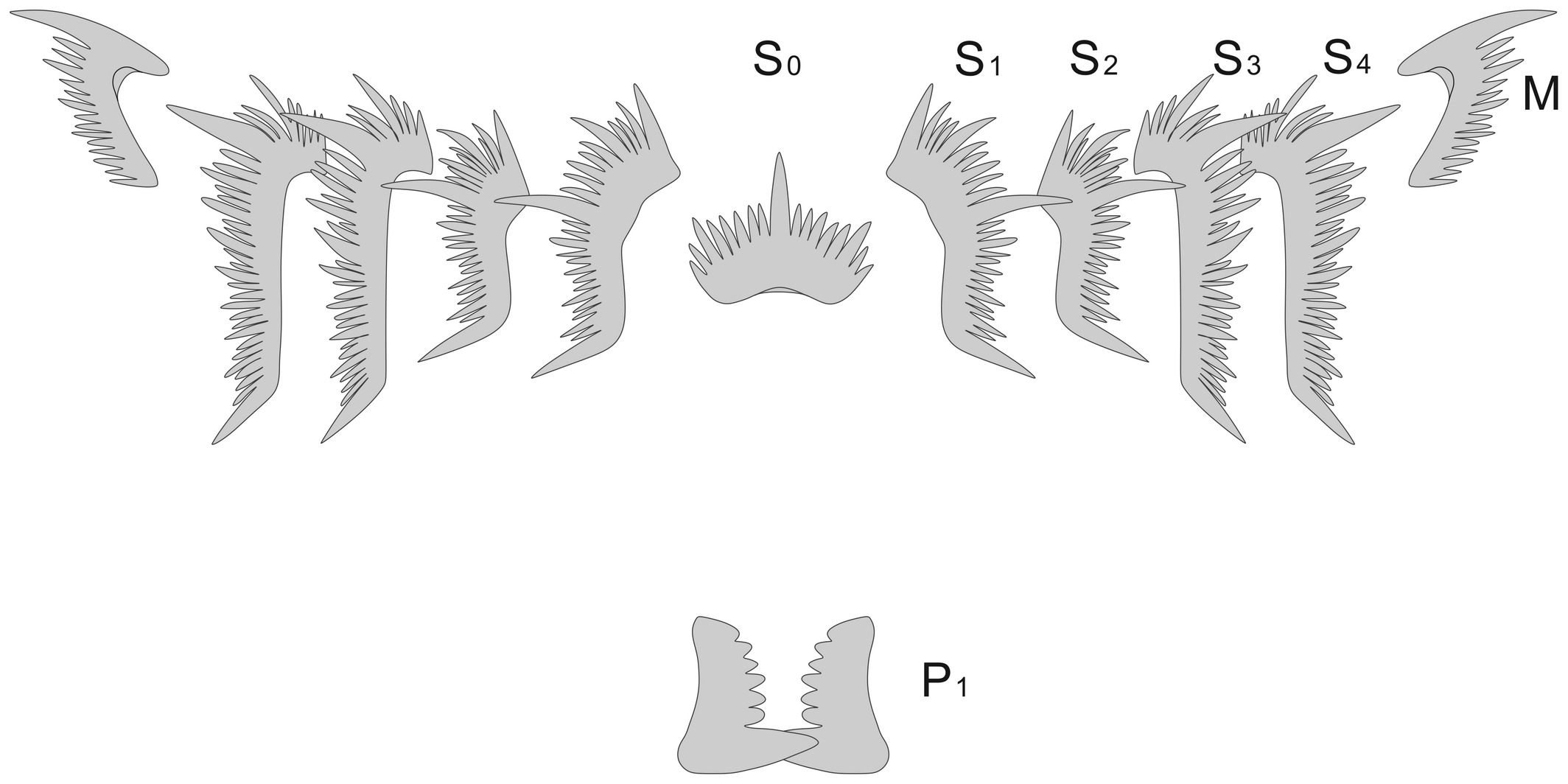
- Complete apparatus

Scientific classification
- Kingdom: Animalia
- Phylum: Chordata
- Infraphylum: Agnatha
- Class: †Conodonta
- Order: †Ozarkodinida
- Family: †Anchignathodontidae
- Genus: †Hindeodus; Rexroad & Furnish, 1964

Species
- †H. capitanensis; †H. changxingensis; †H. cristilus; †H. eurypyge; †H. gulloides; †H. inflatus; †H. julfensis; †H. latidentatus; †H. parvus; †H. permicus; †H. praeparvus; †H. priscus; †H. typicalis; †H. wordensis

= Hindeodus =

Hindeodus Temporal range: Early Carboniferous-Early Triassic 345.3–251.3 Ma

Species of fish (fossil)

Hindeodus is an extinct genus of conodonts in the family Anchignathodontidae. The generic name Hindeodus is a tribute to George Jennings Hinde, a British geologist and paleontologist from the 1800s and early 1900s. The suffix -odus typically describes the animal's teeth, essentially making Hindeodus mean Hinde-teeth.

Conodonts such as Hindeodus are typically small, elongate, marine animals that look similar to eels today. Hindeodus existed from the early Carboniferous through the early Triassic during which they inhabited a wide variety of different environments in the Paleozoic and Triassic seas. Their body consisted entirely of soft tissues, except for an assortment of phosphatic elements believed to be their feeding apparatus. Despite years of controversy regarding their phylogenetic position, conodonts such as Hindeodus are now considered to be vertebrates. They are slightly more derived than the early vertebrates called Cyclostomata, and are part of a large clade of "complex conodonts" called Prioniodontida in the order Ozarkodinina. Hindeodus fossils are distributed worldwide due to the diversity of environments they inhabited. Species of Hindeodus are differentiated by slight variation of the elements of their feeding apparatus. A species of Hindeodus called Hindeodus parvus is particularly well studied because it is used as an index fossil defining the Permian-Triassic boundary.

== History and discovery ==
Hindeodus was first described by Rexroad and Furnish in 1964 during the Illinois State Geological Survey's study of Mississippian stratigraphy. The specimen was found in the Pella Formation of South-central Iowa which is known for excellent preservation of conodonts. However, species of Hindeodus were among the least abundant fossils (less than 0.25 specimens per kilogram of sample). They initially believed that Hindeodus may be a species of Trichondella or Elsonella but determined that Hindeodus is not morphologically and phylogenetically comparable to either and thus, must be a new genus.

While faunal diversity during the end Permian extinction event (251 million years ago) drastically plummeted, Hindeodus survived into the early Triassic. A possible explanation for this is the versatility of certain Hindeodus species in terms of the environments they are able to survive in. Additionally, there is evidence that Hindeodus was able to migrate during the Permian-Triassic transitional period which lead to its wide distribution worldwide during this time.

== Description and paleobiology ==
=== Hindeodus elements ===
Hindeodus was primarily soft-bodied; the only mineralized tissue of Hindeodus (and all other conodonts) are their “elements” that are tooth like structures arranged in particular positions and are thought to have served as a feeding apparatus functioning to grasp and intake prey.

Because conodont elements are essentially the only basis for conodont taxonomy, elements are extensively studied and debated. Therefore, there is specific categorization of elements based on their shape and position. The elements are divided into S, M and P elements. In Hindeodus, S elements are ramiform (branch-like), M elements are makellate (pick-shaped) and P elements are pectiniform (cone-shaped). The H.parvus apparatus in particular consists of six kinds of elements arranged in 13 different positions: nine S elements (unpair S0, paired S1, S2, S3, S4), two M elements, and one pair of P elements (P1). The S0 element is unpaired and has a long sharp cusp but lacks a posterior process. S1 and S2 elements are differentiated by being laterally compressed and having a long sharp cusp with two lateral processes. S3 and S4 elements have a long sharp cusp and an anterior process that is shorter than the posterior process. The M element is the typical makellate (pick-shaped) structure and the P1 element is pectiniform. There are several different hypotheses for the functions of the Hindeodus apparatus. One hypothesis is that the elements were used as support structures for filamentous soft tissue used for suspension feeding. However, upon further analysis it was determined that the S, M and P elements would not provide enough surface area to support ciliated tissue needed for suspension feeding. The more accepted hypothesis is that the conodont elements were used for predation. It is predicted that the S and M elements open allowing the prey to be captured in the oral cavity of the animal. The cusps of these elements aid in food intake by firmly gripping the prey while the blade-like P elements slice like a pair of scissors. This hypothesis is supported by the presence of lingual cartilage found in conodonts that resembles those found in extant cyclostomes (Hagfish and Lamprey) which are also predators.

Morphology of conodont teeth varies widely, but the 15-element dentition of conodonts and their relative position is stable from the Ordovician to the Triassic. The typical 15-element apparatus consisted of 4P elements, 9S elements, and 2M elements. However, Triassic conodonts (such as Hindeodus parvus) only had a 13-element apparatus (9S elements, 2M elements and 2P elements). It was previously believed that the 2 missing elements were due to failure to preserve S1 elements. This was not highly plausible because every other element was exceptionally preserved on the same bedding plane, so it was unlikely that apparatuses were preserved incompletely. An alternative hypothesis was that Hindeodus lost two S elements which implies changes in capture of prey (as the primary function of the S and M array is to trap prey in the animal's mouth). A final hypothesis is that Hindeodus lost two P elements which implies changes in food processing ability, which may be due to a change of diet to food that requires less slicing or crushing to ingest. Upon analysis of conodont history, it is evident that while P elements vary among conodonts, the S-M array is essentially conserved for over 250 million years. This suggests that evolutionary constraints on the number of S and M elements are stronger than those for the P elements, and thus are less likely to change. The loss of P elements is likely linked to the Permian-Triassic extinction event during which many environmental changes occurred that may have impacted the availability of Hindeodus prey, resulting in a change of diet and a new food processing mechanism.

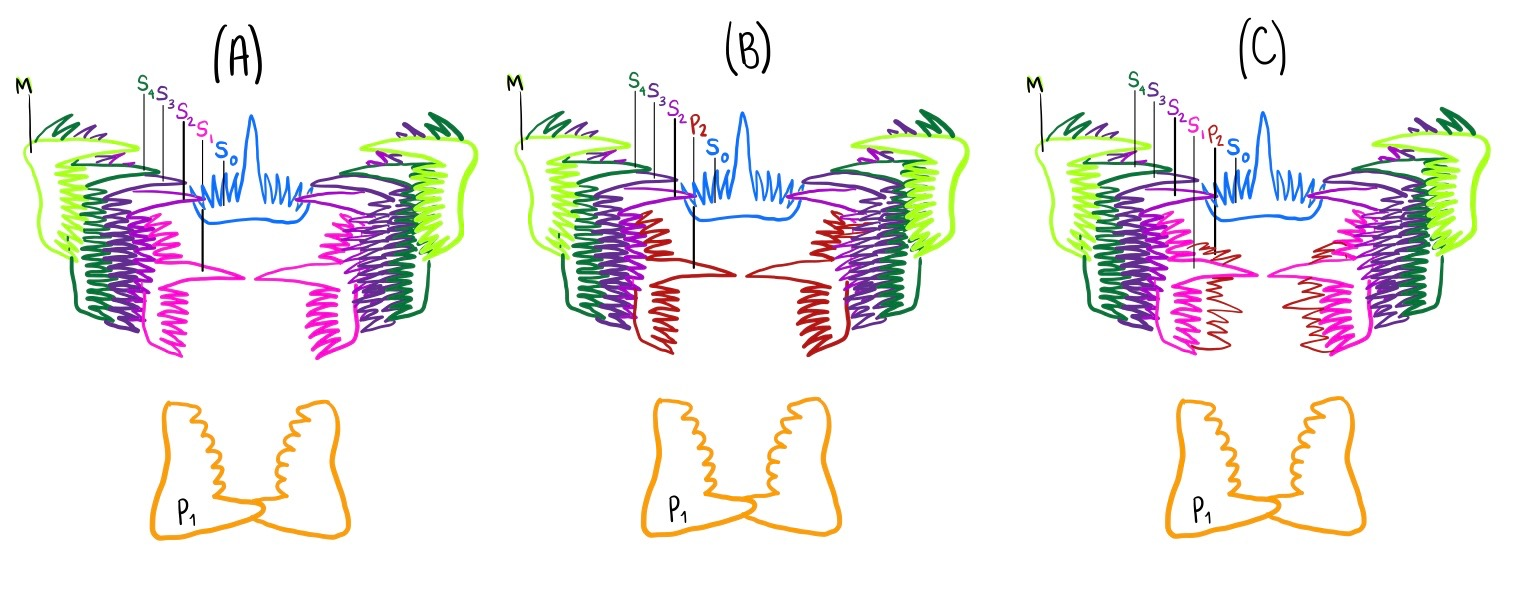
Hypotheses of Hindeodus apparatus. (A) Hypothesis that apparatus is missing two P elements. (B) Hypothesis that apparatus is missing two S elements. (C) Hypothesis that all elements are present, two S elements fail to preserve.

=== Classification ===
Hindeodus is characterized by a P element with a large cusp, denticles that increase in width anteriorly (toward the head) except for the anterior-most denticle and generally decrease in height anteriorly, except for the posterior-most three denticles (the ones furthest back) which are at equal heights. Their cusps are much higher than denticles, and they possess S elements with a short lateral processes that are slightly upturned laterally with denticles of variable size. Hindeodus is differentiated from other conodonts by having P elements with large fixed cusps located at the anterior end of the blade and usually grow primarily by adding new denticles only to the posterior end of the element. Other conodonts vary in growth pattern and location of their cusps. For example, Ozarkidina have cusps located within the blade and growth can occur both anteriorly or posteriorly. In Hindeodus, the P element is crucial for identifying the genus, and had a stable morphology from the Carboniferous into the Triassic with only one minor morphological change. However, in the late Permian and the early Triassic there was rapid evolutionary change especially in the P element. The cause of rapid change in morphology is not certain, but may be related to environmental changes leading to different availability of food source thus leading to changes in feeding mechanism.

Species of Hindeodus are divided into two groups based on the morphology of the posterior portion of the elements. Species such as H.parvus and H.eurypyge grow posteriorly and look rectangular from a lateral perspective. Elements grow by the addition of new denticles to the posterior margin. After one denticle fully grows, a bulge begins to form on the lower posterior margin of the element, and gradually grows upward until the denticle fully develops. The cycle repeats with a new bulge. These elements tend to grow evenly thus yielding a rectangular shape. In contrast, other species such as H.typicalis of H. latidentatus have a sloped lateral profile because the posterior section slopes downward. New denticles form near the posterobasal corner and grow gradually upward but also to the side. These elements tend to preferentially grow on the posterior portion of the element leading to a more sloped shape.

Hindeodus is part of a large clade Prioniodontida (otherwise known as "complex conodonts") which has two major orders of conodonts, Prioniodinina and Ozarkodinina. Hindeodus is part of Ozarkodinina in the family Anchignathodontidae. The synapomorphies that define the clade Prioniodontida is the presence of a P elements with an inner lateral process and peg-like denticles. The synapomorphies of Ozarkodinida are not as clear, but may be the presence of inner and outer lateral process on the S elements.

Species relationships within the genus Hindeodus are also complex, and there is lack of an established and accepted phylogenetic association between species of Hindeodus, but certain relationships may be inferred. H.parvus is likely derived from H.latidentatus based on the location of the fossils along with similarities among their elements. H.parvus and its forerunner H.latidentatus are both easily identified by their P element of their apparatus and their S elements. However, H.parvus is differentiated by the presence of cusps that are two times longer than the surrounding denticles. There are also transition forms that have apparatus features of both H.parvus and H.latidentatus which provide evidence of H.parvus being derived from H.latidentatus. There is also evidence to suggest that most species of Hindeodus likely evolved from H.typicalis and an unnamed species H.n.sp.B that were alive in the early Changsingian. Additionally, the genus Isarcicella likely evolved from Hindeodus (H.parvus) in the Early Triassic.

- Prioniodontida
  - - Paracordylodus
  - - Balognathidae
    - Ozarkodinida
      - Prioniodinina
      - Ozarkodinina
        - Polygnathacea
          - Palmatolepidae
          - - Idiognathodontidae
            - Anchignathodontidae (Hindeodus)
        - Bactrognathidae

== Paleoenvironmental and geological information ==
The paleoecology of Hindeodus was frequently debated. Clark (1974) proposed that Hindeodus was most abundant in nutrient-deficient deep waters of normal salinity, but some may have been in shallow water as well. Behnken (1975) proposed that Hindeodus lived in abnormal salinities. Wardlaw and Collinson (1984) proposed that Hindeodus dominated in lagoonal facies. Orchard (1996) considered Hindeodus to be dominant in shallow, near shore and warm regions. The general consensus now is that Hindeodus lived in wide range of marine depositional environments: nearshore, shallower, and warmer environments as well as deep-water environments, and offshore environments.

Kozur (1996) pointed out that the presence of Hindeodus in a certain area seems to not be controlled by the depth of the water or distance to the shore, but more dependent on the presence of competitor species (such as Gondelellids) that are better adapted to survive in that environment. For example, in the Meishan, Gondelellids were dominant in deep warm-water environments before the ecological stress that occurred in the Late Permian (which was possibly short-lasting cooling in low latitudes due to presence of aerosoles). Gondelellids and many other Permian species in the area disappeared, but ecologically tolerant Hindeodus survived and dominated the area. A similar situation occurred in Iran where Gondelellids were abruptly replaced by the Hindeodus in the deep-water areas. There is evidence that Hindeodus was able to migrate during the Permian Triassic transitional period which lead to its wide distribution worldwide during this time. They were able to survive and evolve in warm-water or cold water and shallow water or deep-water environments despite widespread anoxia during the Permian-Triassic transitional period. This is one of the reasons Hindeodus is an ideal index fossil for the defining the Permian-Triassic boundary.

However, not all species of Hindeodus were able to survive and thrive in a variety of different environments. Species such as H. julfenis, H.changxingensis, H.altudaensis among others are ecologically restricted to deeper, but warm water environments. They are never found in shallow water facies, or in deep water that was presumably home to cold water fauna. In contrast, more common species such as H. typicalis, and H. parvus were more ecologically tolerant and could live in environments not tolerated by other conodonts. H.parvus in particular is exceptionally versatile in regards to what environments it inhabited. H. parvus was found in both shallow water deposits as well as pelagic deposits. It is found in Japan, North America, the Boreal realm (Greenland), and the entire Tethys. (Note: The Tethys are a former tropical body of salt-water that separated the supercontinents of Laurasia in the north from Gondwana in the south during the Mesozoic Era (251-65MYA). Laurasia is what is now North America, and the portion of Eurasia north of the Alpine Himalayan mountain ranges. Gonwana was present day South America, Africa, India, Australia, Antarctica and Eurasian regions south of the Alpine Himalayan chain.)

Although Hindeodus is globally widespread, the Meishan section in Changxing County, Zejiang Province, South China is one of the more notable locations Hindeodus fossils were located. The Meishan section is used as the GSSP (global boundary stratotype section and point) for the Permian-Triassic boundary defined by the first appearance of H.parvus. It is a continuous, pelagic sedimentary record across the Permian-Triassic boundary without any stratigraphic gaps, and is essentially thermally unaltered (CAI=1-1.5). The section consists of 7 quarries at the southern slope of the Meishan hill, 70 to 400m away from each other. The beds of these quarries are nearly identical as they have the same thickness, facies, and fossil content. Quarry D is best studied because it exposes the entire Changxing Limestone whereas the other quarries only expose the middle and upper part of the Changxing Limestone.

== Biostratigraphic significance ==
The species Hindeodus parvus is an index fossil whose first appearance in the fossil beds at Meishan, Changxing County, Zhejiang marks the base of the Triassic, and thus the boundary between the Triassic and Permian. 96% of the fauna in the late Permian disappeared at the Permian-Triassic boundary. Most of the groups that disappeared, re-appeared in the late Olekian (Middle Triassic). It is hypothesized that the extinction was caused by dense aerosols from strong volcanic activity in areas such as the Siberian Trap. These dense aerosols then caused short-lived rapid cooling in low latitudes, similar to a nuclear winter. Widespread anoxic conditions in the lower Triassic prevented the fauna from recovering. Despite the rapid decrease in fauna, the exact Permian/Triassic boundary was still undetermined. It was initially defined by the first appearance of ammonoid (cephalopod) Otoceras. Then, the base of the Triassic was defined by the appearance of Isarcicella isarcica. The location of Isarcicella isarcica is nearly identical to the base of H. parvus, but there are several advantages to using H. parvus to define the biostratigraphic Permian-Triassic boundary. Firstly, Hindeodus is the first globally distributed species that appears immediately after (5 cm above) the minimum in fossil diversity indicated by the minimum in Carbon 13 at the Meishan section. Hindeodus is also not environmentally restricted and can be found in both shallow water deposits and deep-water deposits. It is also thermally tolerant and is found in cool-water environments, mild environments as well as tropical warm-water. Additionally, the derivation of H. parvus from its forerunner H. latidentatus is clear because they are found sandwiched between transition forms. Despite the close proximity with similar fossils, Hindeodus is easily determinable and readily separable by its large cusp. The wide distribution, clear derivation, and easy identifiability of Hindeodus makes it the ideal index fossil, which is why the International Commission on Stratigraphy (ICS) has assigned the First Appearance Datum of Hindeodus parvus as the defining biological marker for the start of the Induan, 252.2 ± 0.5 million years ago, the first stage of the Triassic.
