= Ancyrodella =

Ancyrodella Temporal range: Late Devonian

Scientific classification
- Kingdom: Animalia
- Phylum: Chordata
- Infraphylum: Agnatha
- Class: †Conodonta
- Order: †Ozarkodinida
- Family: †Polygnathidae
- Genus: †Ancyrodella; Ulrich & Bassler, 1926

Species
- †Ancyrodella buckeyensis; †Ancyrodella recta; †Ancyrodella rotundiloba

Extinct genus of jawless fishes

Ancyrodella is an extinct genus of conodonts from the Late Devonian. During the Famennian stage of the Late Devonian, a biologic event occurred (Kellwasser Extinction), wiping out of all Ancyrodella and Ozarkodina species, and most Palmatolepis, Polygnathus and Ancyrognathus species.
