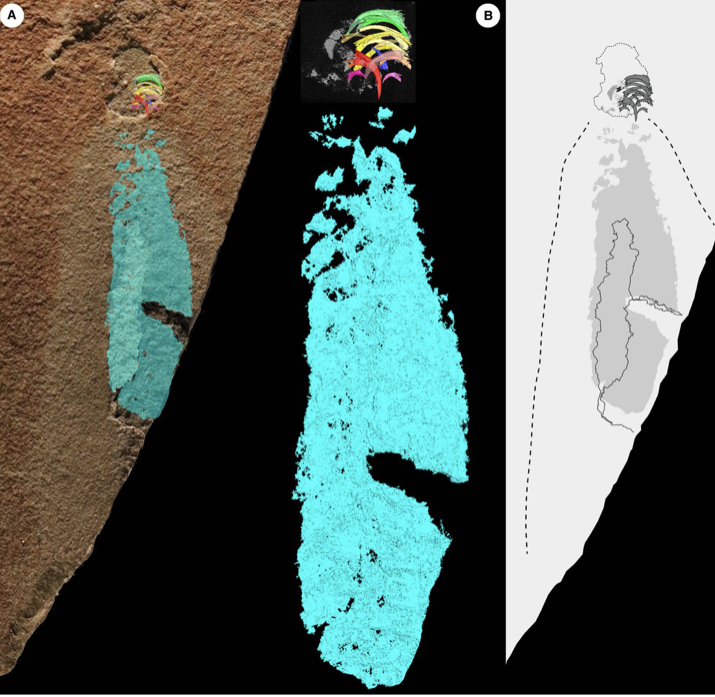
- A body fossil of Panderodus from the Waukesha biota
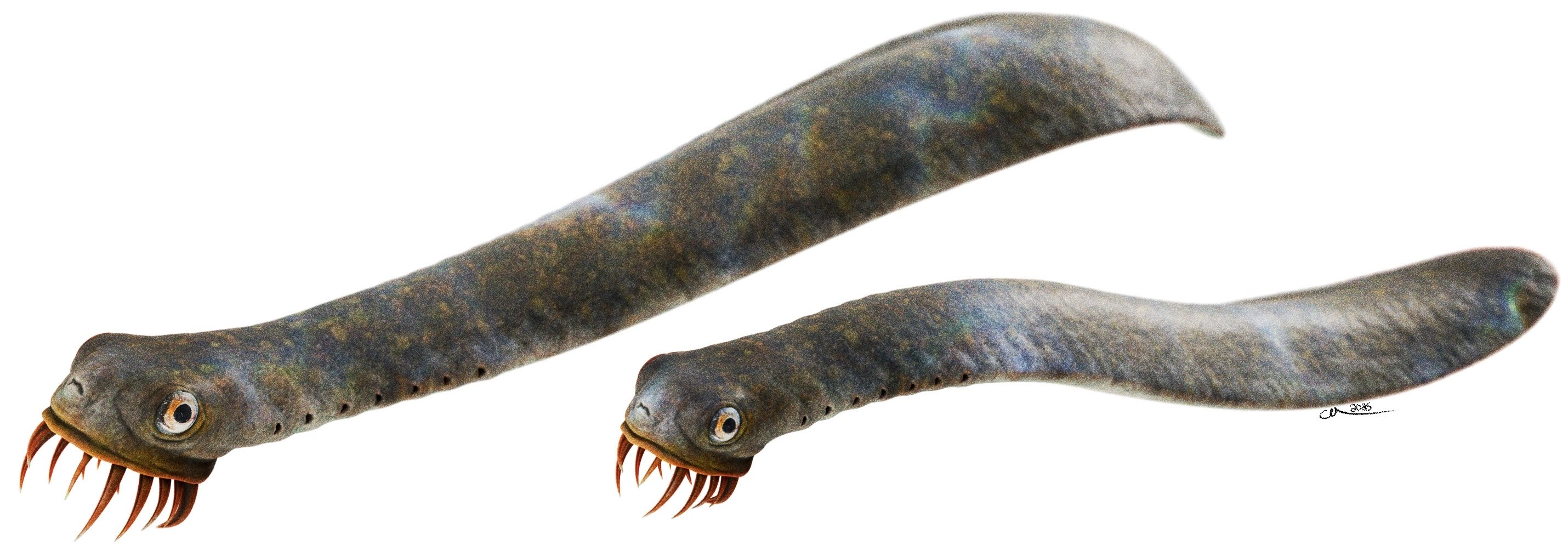
- Life restoration of the species Panderodus unicostatus, based on the Waukesha specimen

Scientific classification
- Kingdom: Animalia
- Phylum: Chordata
- Infraphylum: Agnatha
- Class: †Conodonta
- Order: †Panderodontida
- Family: †Panderodontidae
- Genus: †Panderodus; Ethington, 1959

Type species
- †Panderodus denticulatus

Species
- †Panderodus denticulatus; †Panderodus greenlandensis; †Panderodus rhamphoides; †Panderodus serratus; †Panderodus spasovi; †Panderodus sulcatus; †Panderodus unicostatus

= Panderodus =

Panderodus Temporal range: Middle Ordovician–Late Devonian

Venomous Conodont from the Early Paleozoic

Panderodus is an extinct genus of jawless fish belonging to the order Conodonta. This genus had a long temporal range, surviving from the middle Ordovician to late Devonian. In 2021, extremely rare body fossils of Panderodus from the Waukesha Biota were described, and it revealed that Panderodus had a more thick body compared to the more slender bodies of more advanced conodonts. It also revealed that this conodont was a macrophagous predator, meaning it went after large prey.

== Discovery ==
Panderodus was first described in 1959 on the basis of its tooth structures known as conodont elements. In 1985 a poorly preserved body fossil of the species Panderodus unicostatus was discovered in the Waukesha biota, a fossil site located in southeastern Wisconsin. At the time of its discovery this specimen was the one of only two known conodont body fossils, the other one being a body fossil possibly belonging to Clydagnathus which was found in 1983 from Carboniferous rocks of Scotland. More body fossils have since been found, like a large fossil of the species Promissum pulchrum found in the upper Ordovician soom shale in South Africa in the 1990s, but only 11 total are so far known. The Waukesha fossil was known to have belonged to Panderodus, but wasn't fully analyzed until 2021. This fossil revealed that at least P. unicostatus had a thicker body than most other conodonts, and had more primitive shark-like teeth. These features suggest P. unicostatus was a macrophagous hunter, something rare in vertebrates from the Ordovician-Silurian (due to the fact that many of them had no jaws).

== Classification ==
Panderodus is a conodont of the family Panderodontidae, with Its closest relative being Besselodus. This conodont was relatively primitive; unlike later conodonts whose teeth formed into a complex sieve, the teeth of Panderodus were large and shark-like. The teeth probably had their own roles, like locking prey into place. Conodonts themselves are an unusual grouping, as for more than a hundred years we only knew of them by their teeth structures. Conodonts are classed in the grouping Agnatha alongside jawless fish like lampreys and hagfish.

Conodonts such as Panderodus were typically small to medium-sized, elongate, marine vertebrates that look similar to eels today. These creatures have been classified under a large amount of animals, however now they are recognized as agnathan vertebrates.

The phylogenetic position of Panderodus relative to other conodonts with complete apparatus reconstructions:

- Chordata
  - Gnathostomata
  - Cyclostomata
  - †Conodonta
    - †Furnishina
    - - †Problematoconites
      - †Euconodonta
        - †Cordylodus
        - - - †Besselodus
            - †Panderodus
          - - †Paracordylodus
            - - - †Promissum
                - †Notiodella
              - - †Erismodus
                - - †Clydagnathus
                  - †Idiognathodus

== Venom ==
Another study found that some species of Panderodus exhibited body parts that would mean they would be venomous. This makes these conodonts some of the earliest known venomous organisms in the fossil record.
