= Palmatolepis =

Palmatolepis Temporal range: Late Devonian

Scientific classification
- Kingdom: Animalia
- Phylum: Chordata
- Infraphylum: Agnatha
- Class: †Conodonta
- Order: †Ozarkodinida
- Family: †Palmatolepidae
- Genus: †Palmatolepis; Müller 1956

Species
- See text

Extinct genus of jawless fishes

Palmatolepis is an extinct conodont genus in the family Palmatolepidae. It was the most abundant genus of conodonts of the Late Devonian, disappearing during the Devonian/Carboniferous crisis.

== Species ==
- †Palmatolepis glabra
- †Palmatolepis hassi
- †Palmatolepis khaensis Savage 2013
- †Palmatolepis marki Savage 2013
- †Palmatolepis spallettae
- †Palmatolepis subperlobata
  - †Palmatolepis subperlobata lapoensis Savage 2013
- †Palmatolepis triangularis
- †Palmatolepis unicornis

== Use in stratigraphy ==
The Famennian (372.2 ± 1.6 mya) is defined by a GSSP Golden Spike located at Coumiac quarry, Montagne Noire, France where there is a biologic abundant occurrence of Palmatolepis triangularis.

During that stage, a biologic event occurred (Upper Kellwasser Extinction of all Ancyrodella and Ozarkodina and most Palmatolepis, Polygnathus and Ancyrognathus.
