= Ancyrognathus =

Ancyrognathus Temporal range: Late Devonian

Scientific classification
- Kingdom: Animalia
- Phylum: Chordata
- Infraphylum: Agnatha
- Class: †Conodonta
- Order: †Ozarkodinida
- Family: †Polygnathidae
- Genus: †Ancyrognathus; Branson and Mehl, 1934

Species
- †Ancyrognathus primus; †Ancymgnathus symmetries (type); †Ancyrognathus triangularis

Extinct genus of jawless fishes

Ancyrognathus is an extinct genus of conodonts.

During the Famennian stage of the Late Devonian, a biologic event occurred (Upper Kellwasser Extinction of all Ancyrodella and Ozarkodina and most Palmatolepis, Polygnathus and Ancyrognathus).
