= Eichenberg =

Eichenberg may refer to:

== Places ==
- Eichenberg, Austria, a municipality in the district of Bregenz in the state of Vorarlberg, Austria
- Eichenberg, Hildburghausen, a municipality in the district of Hildburghausen in the state of Thuringia, Germany
- Eichenberg, Saale-Holzland, a municipality in the district of Saale-Holzland in the state of Thuringia, Germany
- a summit near to Frammersbach in Main-Spessart district in the Regierungsbezirk of Lower Franconia (Unterfranken) in Bavaria, Germany]
- Eichenberg station, in Neu-Eichenberg, Hesse, Germany.

== People with the surname ==
- Fritz Eichenberg (1901–1990), German-American illustrator
- Liam Eichenberg (born 1998), American football player
- Tim Eichenberg (born 1951), American politician
- Tommy Eichenberg (born 2001), American football player
- Wilhelm Eichenberg (fl. 1930s), geologist and zoologist
