= Gladigondolellidae =

Gladigondolellidae Temporal range: Spathian – Carnian

Scientific classification
- Kingdom: Animalia
- Phylum: Chordata
- Infraphylum: Agnatha
- Class: †Conodonta
- Order: †Ozarkodinida
- Family: †Gladigondolellidae; Ishida & Hirsch, 2010

Extinct family of jawless fishes

Gladigondolellidae is an extinct family of conodonts which lived in the Triassic Period. They ranged from near the end of the Early Triassic (late Spathian substage of the Olenekian stage) through to the early part of the Late Triassic (late Julian substage of the Carnian stage). At its most narrow definition, the family includes a single subfamily, Gladigondolellinae, itself including a single genus, Gladigondolella.
