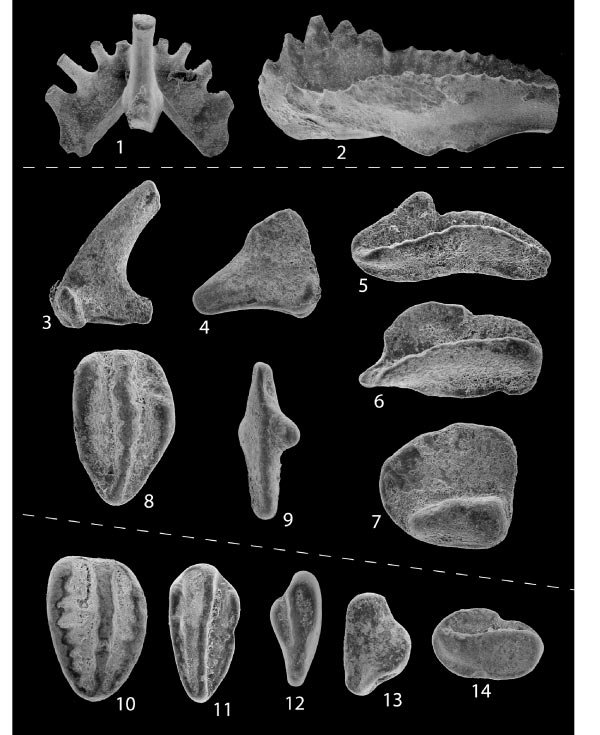
- Pa elements, lateral view, X140; 2, 5: Cavusgnathus unicornis 6, 7, 14 Cavusgnathus sp. see detail: 2. gamma morphotype, from the Deer Valley Member of the Mauch Chunk Formation, Keystone quarry, Pa.; 5. alpha morphotype, and 6, 7. from the uppermost Loyalhanna Limestone Member of the Mauch Chunk Formation, Keystone quarry, Pa.; 14. 93RS–67, from the basal 20 cm of the Loyalhanna Limestone Member of the Mauch Chunk Formation, Keystone quarry, Pa. (93RS–79a), and Westernport, Md.

Scientific classification
- Kingdom: Animalia
- Phylum: Chordata
- Infraphylum: Agnatha
- Class: †Conodonta
- Order: †Ozarkodinida
- Family: †Cavusgnathidae
- Genus: †Cavusgnathus; Harris and Hollingsworth, 1933

Species
- †Cavusgnathus gigantus; †Cavusgnathus lautus; †Cavusgnathus missouriensis; †Cavusgnathus unicornis

= Cavusgnathus =

Cavusgnathus Temporal range: Pennsylvanian

Extinct genus of jawless fishes

Cavusgnathus is an extinct genus of conodonts.

Glen K. Merrill stated in 1963 that "conodont workers have considered Idiognathoides to be a junior synonym of Polygnathodella but it now proves to be a junior synonym of Cavusgnathus. Polygnathodella and Cavusgnathus are shown to form a transitional series."
