= Alternognathus =

Alternognathus Temporal range: Famennian

Scientific classification
- Kingdom: Animalia
- Phylum: Chordata
- Infraphylum: Agnatha
- Class: †Conodonta
- Order: †Ozarkodinida
- Family: †Elictognathidae
- Genus: †Alternognathus; Ziegler & Sandberg, 1984

Species
- †Alternognathus beulensis; †Alternognathus regularis

Extinct genus of jawless fishes

Alternognathus is an extinct conodont genus in the family Elictognathidae. An extensive study on its population dynamics and lifespan has recently been published.
