= Paracordylodontidae =

Scientific classification
- Domain: Eukaryota
- Kingdom: Animalia
- Phylum: Chordata
- Infraphylum: Agnatha
- Class: †Conodonta
- Clade: †Prioniodontida
- Family: †Paracordylodontidae; Bergström, 1981

Genera
- †Cooperignathus; †Fahraeusodus; †Oelandodus; †Paracordylodus; †Protoprioniodus

Extinct family of jawless fishes

Paracordylodontidae is an extinct family of conodonts in the clade Prioniodontida, also known as the "complex conodonts".

== Genera ==
Genera are:

- †Cooperignathus
- †Fahraeusodus
- †Oelandodus
- †Paracordylodus
- †Protoprioniodus
