= Protoprioniodus =

Protoprioniodus Temporal range: Middle Ordovician

Scientific classification
- Kingdom: Animalia
- Phylum: Chordata
- Infraphylum: Agnatha
- Class: †Conodonta
- Family: †Paracordylodontidae
- Genus: †Protoprioniodus; McTavish, 1973

Species
- †Protoprioniodus aranda; †Protoprioniodus cowheadensis; †Protoprioniodus nyinti; †Protoprioniodus papiliosus; †Protoprioniodus simplicissimus (type); †Protoprioniodus yapu

Extinct genus of jawless fishes

Protoprioniodus is an extinct genus of conodonts.

== Use in stratigraphy ==
The Whiterock Stage refers mainly to the early Middle Ordovician in North America. It is often used in the older literature in a global sense. The Whiterock Stage is given a range from 471.8 (ca. 472) to 462 m.y.a., spanning close to 10 million years. Officially its start is defined by the potentially lowest occurrence of the conodonts Protoprioniodus aranda or Baltoniodus triangularis.
