= Patrognathus =

Patrognathus Temporal range: Tournaisian

Scientific classification
- Kingdom: Animalia
- Phylum: Chordata
- Infraphylum: Agnatha
- Class: †Conodonta
- Order: †Ozarkodinida
- Family: †Cavusgnathidae
- Genus: †Patrognathus; Rhodes, Austin & Druce, 1969

Species
- †Patrognathus andersoni; †Patrognathus crassus; †Patrognathus variabilis

Extinct genus of jawless fishes

Patrognathus is an extinct genus of conodonts.

== Use in stratigraphy ==
The Tournaisian, the oldest age of the Mississippian (also known as Lower Carboniferous) contains eight conodont biozones, four of which contain Patrognathus species:

- the zone of Siphonodella quadruplicata and Patrognathus andersoni (upper zone of Patrognathus andersoni)
- the lower zone of Patrognathus andersoni
- the zone of Patrognathus variabilis
- the zone of Patrognathus crassus
