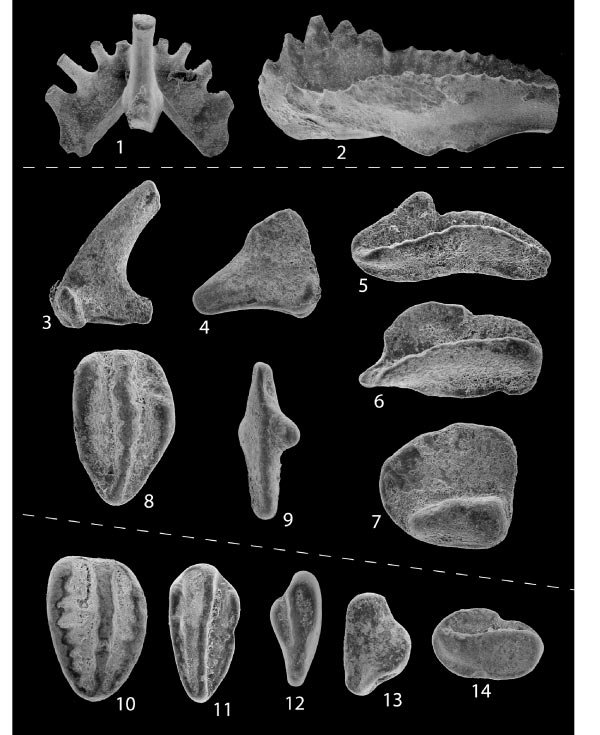
- Kladognathus sp, all X140. 1. Sa element, posterior view. 3, 4. Sa element, lateral views. 13. M element, lateral views, 93RS–67. See detail: 1. Conodonts from the Deer Valley Member of the Mauch Chunk Formation, Keystone quarry, Pa. This collection (93RS–79c) is from the lower 10 cm of the Deer Valley Member. Note the nonabraded, although slightly broken, conodont elements of the high-energy oolitic marine facies of the Deer Valley Member. 3–4. Conodonts from the uppermost Loyalhanna Limestone Member of the Mauch Chunk Formation, Keystone quarry, Pa. This collection (93RS–79b) is from the upper 10 cm of the Loyalhanna Member. Note the highly abraded and reworked aeolian forms. 13. Conodonts from the basal 20 cm of the Loyalhanna Limestone Member of the Mauch Chunk Formation, Keystone quarry, Pa. (93RS–79a), and Westernport, Md. (93RS–67). Note the highly abraded and reworked aeolian forms.

Scientific classification
- Kingdom: Animalia
- Phylum: Chordata
- Class: †Conodonta
- Order: †Prioniodontida
- Family: †Coleodontidae
- Genus: †Kladognathus Rexroad 1958

Species
- †Kladognathus complectens; †Kladognathus primus; †Kladognathus tenuis

Synonyms
- †Cladognathodus Rexroad and Collinson, 1961

= Kladognathus =

Extinct genus of jawless fishes

Kladognathus is an extinct genus of conodonts.
