= Stig Bergström =

American paleontologist

Stig M. Bergström (born 12 June 1935 in Skövde) is a Swedish-American paleontologist.

In 1981, he described the conodont family Paracordylodontidae. In 1974, he described the multielement conodont genus Appalachignathus from the Middle Ordovician of North America.

== Awards and tributes ==
He received the Pander Medal by the Pander Society. In 1999, he received the Raymond C. Moore Medal, awarded by the Society for Sedimentary Geology to persons who have made significant contributions in the field which have promoted the science of stratigraphy by research in paleontology and evolution and the use of fossils for interpretations of paleoecology. In 2011, he received the Paleontological Society Medal.

The rhipidognathid conodont genus Bergstroemognathus Spergali 1974 has been named in his honour.
