= Appalachignathus =

Appalachignathus Temporal range: Middle Ordovician

Scientific classification
- Kingdom: Animalia
- Phylum: Chordata
- Infraphylum: Agnatha
- Class: †Conodonta
- Family: †Rhipidognathidae
- Genus: †Appalachignathus; Bergström at al. 1974

Species
- †Appalachignathus delicatulus (type)

Genus of jawless fishes

Appalachignathus is a genus of multielement conodonts from the Middle Ordovician of North America and Australia.

The elements of Appalachignathus are amongst the first occurrences of the Ozarkodina-type feeding apparatuses.
