= Icriodus =

Scientific classification
- Kingdom: Animalia
- Phylum: Chordata
- Infraphylum: Agnatha
- Class: †Conodonta
- Order: †Ozarkodinida
- Family: †Gnathodontidae
- Genus: †Icriodus; Branson and Mehl 1938

Species
- †Icriodus amabilis Bultynck and Hollard 1980; †Icriodus ballbergensis Lüddecke, Hartenfels and Becker 2017; †Icriodus fusiformis; †Icriodus latericrescens Branson and Mehl 1938; †Icriodus marieae Suttner, Kido and Suttner 2017; †Icriodus olgaborisovnae Nazarova, Kononova, 2022; †Icriodus ovalis Bultynck in Aboussalam, Becker & Bultynck 2015; †Icriodus praerectirostratus Bultynck in Aboussalam, Becker & Bultynck 2015; Icriodus praealternatus ferus Wang et al 2016; †Icriodus plurinodosus Wang et al 2016; †Icriodus quartadecimensis Nazarova & Soboleva, 2024; †Icriodus stenoancylus; †Icriodus stenoancylus junggarensis Wang et al 2016; †Icriodus woschmidti

Extinct genus of jawless fishes

Icriodus is an extinct conodont genus in the family Gnathodontidae.

In 1938, Edward Branson and Maurice Mehl reviewed the conodont genus Icriodus.
