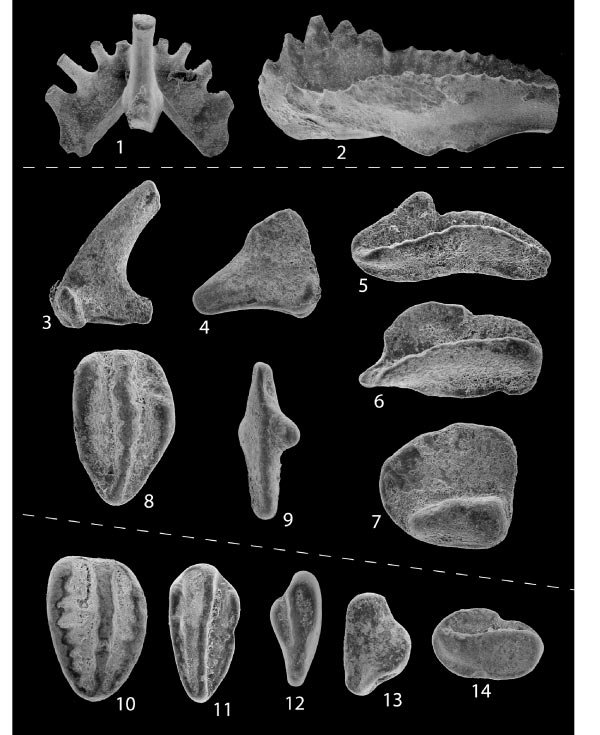
- 10–11. Polygnathus sp. (see caption) 10–14. Conodonts from the basal 20 cm of the Loyalhanna Limestone Member of the Mauch Chunk Formation, Keystone quarry, Pa. (93RS–79a), and Westernport, Md. (93RS–67). Note the highly abraded and reworked aeolian forms.: 10. Polygnathus sp., Pa element, upper view, reworked Late Devonian to Early Mississippian morphotype, 93RS–79a, X140.; 11. Polygnathus sp., Pa element, upper view, reworked Late Devonian to Early Mississippian morphotype, 93RS–67, X140.

Scientific classification
- Domain: Eukaryota
- Kingdom: Animalia
- Phylum: Chordata
- Subphylum: Vertebrata
- Infraphylum: Agnatha
- Class: †Conodonta
- Order: †Ozarkodinida
- Suborder: †Ozarkodinina
- Superfamily: †Polygnathacea; Bassler, 1925

Families
- †Cavusgnathidae Clark et al., 1981; †Palmatolepidae Müller, 1956; †Polygnathidae Bassler, 1925

= Polygnathacea =

Extinct superfamily of jawless fish

Polygnathacea is an extinct superfamily of conodonts.

== Families ==
Families are:

- †Cavusgnathidae Clark et al., 1981
- †Palmatolepidae Müller, 1956
- †Polygnathidae Bassler, 1925
