= Rhipidognathidae =

Rhipidognathidae Temporal range: Ordovician

Scientific classification
- Kingdom: Animalia
- Phylum: Chordata
- Infraphylum: Agnatha
- Class: †Conodonta
- Clade: †Prioniodontida
- Family: †Rhipidognathidae; Lindström, 1970 sensu Sweet, 1988

Genera
- †Appalachignathus Bergström et al., 1974; †Bergstroemognathus Spergali, 1974; †Rhipidognathus Branson, Mehl and Branson, 1951

Extinct family of jawless fishes

Rhipidognathidae is a family of multielement conodonts from the Ordovician.

== Genera ==
Genera are:

- †Appalachignathus Bergström et al., 1974
- †Bergstroemognathus Spergali, 1974
- †Rhipidognathus Branson, Mehl and Branson, 1951
