= Gnathodontidae =

Scientific classification
- Domain: Eukaryota
- Kingdom: Animalia
- Phylum: Chordata
- Infraphylum: Agnatha
- Class: †Conodonta
- Order: †Ozarkodinida
- Family: †Gnathodontidae; Sweet 1988

Genera
- †Icriodus

Extinct family of jawless fishes

Gnathodontidae is an extinct conodont family in the order Ozarkodinida. It consists of the extinct genus Icriodus.
