= Mestognathidae =

Scientific classification
- Kingdom: Animalia
- Phylum: Chordata
- Infraphylum: Agnatha
- Class: †Conodonta
- Order: †Ozarkodinida
- Family: †Mestognathidae; Austin & Rhodes 1981

Genera
- †Laterignathus; †Mestognathus

Extinct family of jawless fishes

Mestognathidae is an extinct conodont family in the order Ozarkodinida.

Genera are Laterignathus and Mestognathus.
