= Elictognathidae =

Scientific classification
- Kingdom: Animalia
- Phylum: Chordata
- Infraphylum: Agnatha
- Class: †Conodonta
- Order: †Ozarkodinida
- Family: †Elictognathidae; Austin & Rhodes 1981

Genera
- †Alternognathus; †Elictognathus; †Pinacognathus

Extinct family of jawless fishes

Elictognathidae is an extinct conodont family.

Genera are Alternognathus, Elictognathus, and Pinacognathus.
