= Clydagnathus =

Clydagnathus Temporal range: 360.7–345 Ma

Scientific classification
- Kingdom: Animalia
- Phylum: Chordata
- Infraphylum: Agnatha
- Class: †Conodonta
- Order: †Ozarkodinida
- Family: †Cavusgnathidae
- Genus: †Clydagnathus; Rhodes, Austin & Druce, 1969

Species
- †Clydagnathus cavusformis Rhodes, Austin & Druce, 1969; †Clydagnathus ormistoni Beinert et al, 1971; †Clydagnathus windsorensis

Extinct genus of jawless fishes

Clydagnathus is a genus of conodonts in the family Cavusgnathidae. Species are known from the Carboniferous of India and the Devonian of Morocco.
