= Cavusgnathidae =

Scientific classification
- Kingdom: Animalia
- Phylum: Chordata
- Infraphylum: Agnatha
- Class: †Conodonta
- Order: †Ozarkodinida
- Superfamily: †Polygnathacea
- Family: †Cavusgnathidae; Austin & Rhodes in Clark et al. 1981

Genera
- †Adetognathus; †Cavusgnathus; †Clydagnathus; †Ferganaegnathodus; †Neolochriea; †Patrognathus; †Pseudopolygnathus; †Rhachistognathus; †Scaphignathus; †Taphrognathus; †Weyerognathus

Extinct family of jawless fishes

Cavusgnathidae is an extinct family of conodonts in the order Ozarkodinida.

== Genera ==
Genera are,

- †Adetognathus
- †Cavusgnathus
- †Clydagnathus
- †Ferganaegnathodus
- †Neolochriea
- †Patrognathus
- †Pseudopolygnathus
- †Rhachistognathus
- †Scaphignathus
- †Taphrognathus
- †Weyerognathus
