= Wilhelm Eichenberg =

Wilhelm Eichenberg (fl. 1930) was a geologist and zoologist known for having described the class Conodonta of prehistoric jawless fish in 1930.
