= Paracordylodus =

Paracordylodus Temporal range: Early Ordovician

Scientific classification
- Domain: Eukaryota
- Kingdom: Animalia
- Phylum: Chordata
- Infraphylum: Agnatha
- Class: †Conodonta
- Family: †Paracordylodontidae
- Genus: †Paracordylodus; Lindström, 1971

Species
- †Paracordylodus gracilis Lindström, 1955

Extinct genus of jawless fishes

Paracordylodus is an extinct genus of conodonts in the clade Prioniodontida, also known as the "complex conodonts". The species P. gracilis has been recovered from the chert of the Narooma terrane, a geological structural region on the south coast of New South Wales, Australia.
