= Prioniodontida =

Prioniodontida ("Complex conodonts") Temporal range:

Scientific classification
- Domain: Eukaryota
- Kingdom: Animalia
- Phylum: Chordata
- Infraphylum: Agnatha
- Class: †Conodonta
- Clade: †Euconodonta
- Clade: †Prioniodontida; Dzik, 1976

Orders
- See text

Extinct clade of conodonts

Prioniodontida, also known as the "complex conodonts", is a large clade of conodonts that includes two major evolutionary grades; the Prioniodinina and the Ozarkodinina. It includes many of the more famous conodonts, such as the giant ordovician Promissum (Prioniodinina) from the Soom Shale and the Carboniferous specimens from the Granton Shrimp bed (Ozarkodinina). They are euconodonts, in that their elements are composed of two layers; the crown and the basal body, and are assumed to be a clade.

== Phylogeny ==
This is a recent cladogram of the Prioniodontida, simplified from Donoghue et al., (2008).

- Prioniodontida
  - - Paracordylodus
  - - Balognathidae
    - Ozarkodinida
      - Prioniodinina
      - Ozarkodinina
        - Polygnathacea
          - Palmatolepidae
          - - Polygnathidae
            - Idiognathodontidae
        - Bactrognathidae (Note: Bactrognathidae is actually only one of two families (the other unnamed) belonging to a superfamily that is as yet unnamed.)
