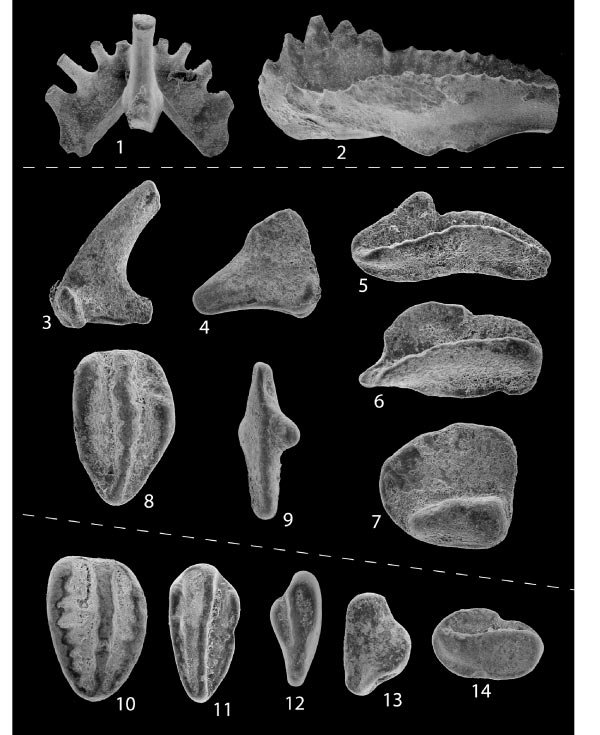
- 10–11. Polygnathus sp. (see caption) 10–14. Conodonts from the basal 20 cm of the Loyalhanna Limestone Member of the Mauch Chunk Formation, Keystone quarry, Pa. (93RS–79a), and Westernport, Md. (93RS–67). Note the highly abraded and reworked aeolian forms.: 10. Polygnathus sp., Pa element, upper view, reworked Late Devonian to Early Mississippian morphotype, 93RS–79a, X140.; 11. Polygnathus sp., Pa element, upper view, reworked Late Devonian to Early Mississippian morphotype, 93RS–67, X140.

Scientific classification
- Kingdom: Animalia
- Phylum: Chordata
- Infraphylum: Agnatha
- Class: †Conodonta
- Order: †Ozarkodinida
- Superfamily: †Polygnathacea
- Family: †Polygnathidae; Bassler, 1925

Genera
- †Ancyrodella; †Ancyrognathus; †Avignathus; †Bispathodus; †Ctenopolygnathus; †Mehlina; †Nicollidina; †Pandorinellina; †Parapolygnathus; †Polygnathus Hinde, 1879 (type); †Streptognathodus; †Synclydagnathus

= Polygnathidae =

Extinct family of jawless fishes

Polygnathidae is an extinct family of conodonts.
