= Palmatolepidae =

Scientific classification
- Kingdom: Animalia
- Phylum: Chordata
- Infraphylum: Agnatha
- Class: †Conodonta
- Order: †Ozarkodinida
- Superfamily: †Polygnathacea
- Family: †Palmatolepidae; Sweet 1988

Genera
- †Conditolepis; †Dinodus; †Kielcelepis; †Klapperilepis; †Lagovilepis; †Manticolepis; †Mesotaxis; †Palmatolepis; †Panderolepis; †Tripodellus

Extinct family of jawless fishes

Palmatolepidae is an extinct conodont family. It is part of the clade Prioniodontida, also known as the "complex conodonts".
