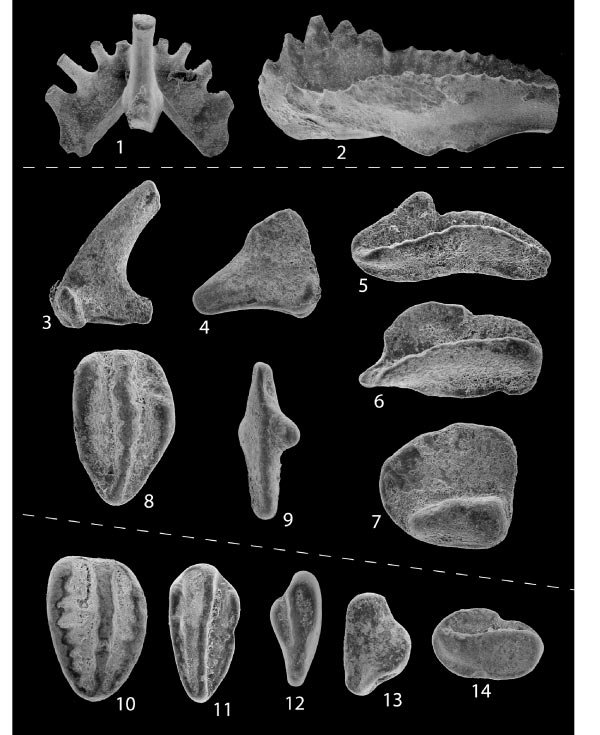
- 10–11. Polygnathus sp. detail 10–14. Conodonts from the basal 20 cm of the Loyalhanna Limestone Member of the Mauch Chunk Formation, Keystone quarry, Pa. (93RS–79a), and Westernport, Md. (93RS–67). Note the highly abraded and reworked aeolian forms.: 10. Polygnathus sp., Pa element, upper view, reworked Late Devonian to Early Mississippian morphotype, 93RS–79a, X140.; 11. Polygnathus sp., Pa element, upper view, reworked Late Devonian to Early Mississippian morphotype, 93RS–67, X140.

Scientific classification
- Kingdom: Animalia
- Phylum: Chordata
- Infraphylum: Agnatha
- Class: †Conodonta
- Order: †Ozarkodinida
- Family: †Polygnathidae
- Genus: †Polygnathus; Hinde 1879

Species
- See text

= Polygnathus =

Extinct genus of jawless fishes

Polygnathus is an extinct genus of conodonts.

== Species ==
- †Polygnathus acrinodosus Aboussalam 2003
- †Polygnathus alkhovikovae Baranov, Slavík & Blodgett 2014
- †Polygnathus angustipennatus Bischoff and Ziegler 1957
- †Polygnathus aragonensis Martínez-Pérez & Valenzuela-Ríos 2014
- †Polygnathus arthuri Baranov, Slavík & Blodgett 2014
- †Polygnathus bardashevi Baranov, Slavík & Blodgett 2014
- †Polygnathus bicristatus Mossoni et al. 2015
- †Polygnathus burretti Savage 2013
- †Polygnathus chongqingensis Wang in Gong et al. 2012
- †Polygnathus carlsi Martínez-Pérez & Valenzuela-Ríos 2014
- †Polygnathus communis
  - †Polygnathus communis hanensis Savage 2013
  - †Polygnathus communis longanensis Qie et al. 2014
  - †Polygnathus communis namdipensis Savage 2013
  - †Polygnathus communis phaphaensis Savage 2013
- †Polygnathus costatus Klapper 1971
  - †Polygnathus costatus partitus
- †Polygnathus crassulus
  - †Polygnathus crassulus salapensis Savage 2013
- †Polygnathus damelei Vodrazkova et al. 2011
- †Polygnathus dujieensis Qie et al. 2014
- †Polygnathus efimovae Kononova et al. 1996
- †Polygnathus extralobatus phoensis Savage 2013
- †Polygnathus hemiansatus
- †Polygnathus hemipennatus Aboussalam 2003
- †Polygnathus hojedki Gholamalian et al. 2013
- †Polygnathus holynensis Vodrazkova et al. 2011
- †Polygnathus housei Aboussalam 2003
- †Polygnathus ivanowskyii Baranov, Slavík & Blodgett 2014
- †Polygnathus karsteni Baranov, Slavík & Blodgett 2014
- †Polygnathus kitabicus
- †Polygnathus lezhoevi Baranov, Slavík & Blodgett 2014
- †Polygnathus ilmenensis Zhuravlev 2003
- †Polygnathus linguiformis Hinde
- †Polygnathus michaelmurphyi Baranov, Slavík & Blodgett 2014
- †Polygnathus nuragicus Mossoni et al. 2015
- †Polygnathus ovaliformis Izokh 2025
- †Polygnathus peltatus Yuan & Sun 2023
- †Polygnathus pollocki Druce 1976
- †Polygnathus postvogesi Plotitsyn & Zhuravlev 2017
- †Polygnathus praeinversus Lu et al. 2018
- †Polygnathus pseudocommunis Wang et al. 2016
- †Polygnathus pseudocostatus Klapper & Vodrážková 2013
- †Polygnathus ramoni Martínez-Pérez & Valenzuela-Ríos 2014
- †Polygnathus robertensis Vodrazkova et al. 2011
- †Polygnathus rossicus Zhuravlev 2000
- †Polygnathus sagittiformis Yuan & Sun 2023
- †Polygnathus salixensis Vodrazkova et al. 2011
- †Polygnathus settedabanicus Baranov, Slavík & Blodgett 2014
- †Polygnathus sharyuensis Ovnatanova et al. 2019
- †Polygnathus varcus Stauffer 1940
- †Polygnathus wapanuckensis Harlton 1933
- †Polygnathus wuqingnaensis Huang et al. 2023
- †Polygnathus yakutensis Baranov, Slavík & Blodgett 2014

== Use in stratigraphy ==
The Tournaisian, the oldest age of the Mississippian (also known as Lower Carboniferous), contains eight conodont biozones, one of which is defined by a Polygnathus species:

- the zone of Gnathodus pseudosemiglaber and Scaliognathus anchoralis
- the zone of Gnathodus semiglaber and Polygnathus communis
- the zone of Dollymae bouckaerti
- the zone of Gnathodus typicus and Siphonodella isosticha
- the zone of Siphonodella quadruplicata and Patrognathus andersoni (upper zone of Patrognathus andersoni)
- the lower zone of Patrognathus andersoni
- the zone of Patrognathus variabilis
- the zone of Patrognathus crassus

== See also ==
- List of Global Boundary Stratotype Sections and Points
