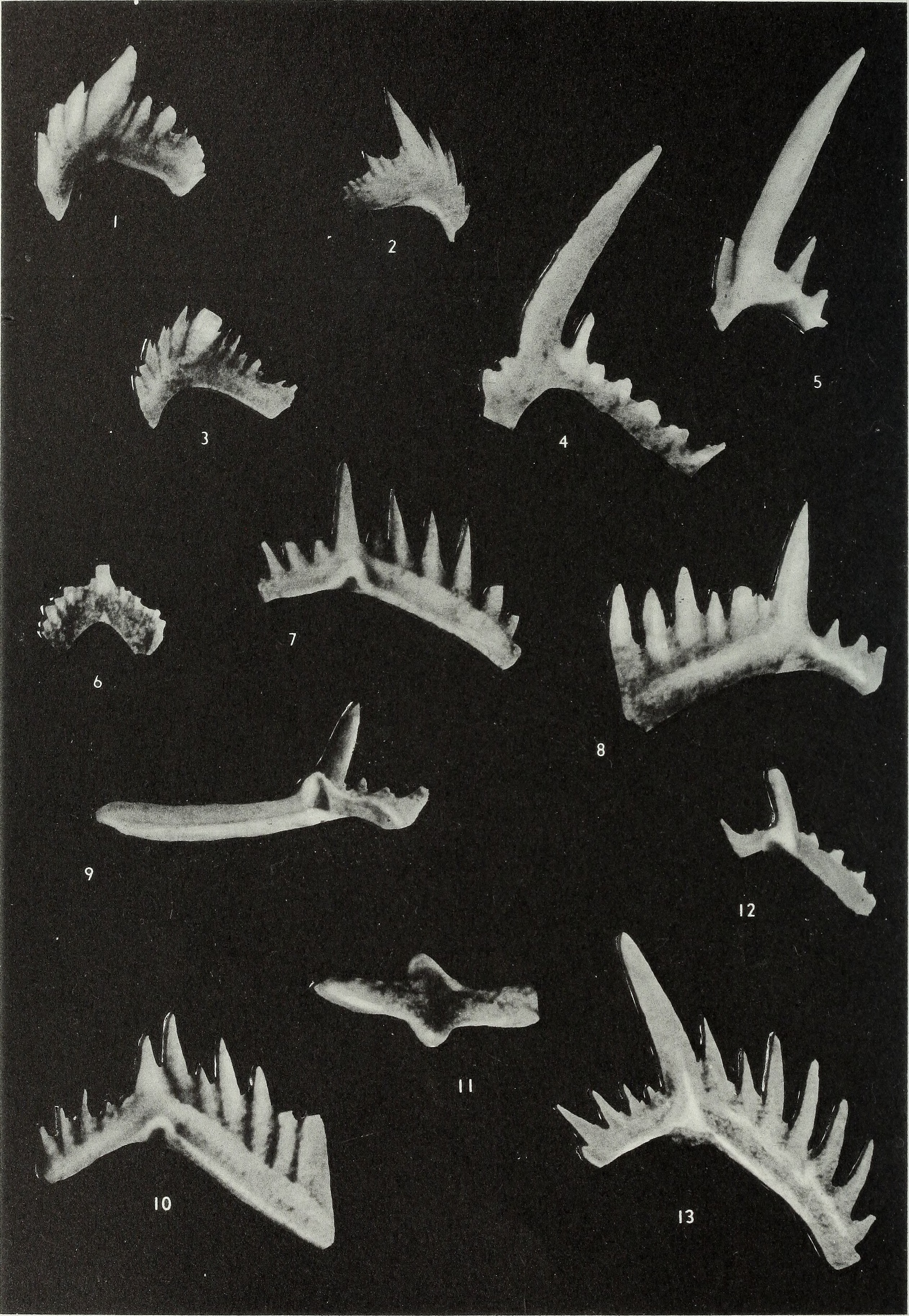
- Conodont elements

Scientific classification
- Kingdom: Animalia
- Phylum: Chordata
- Subphylum: Vertebrata
- Infraphylum: Agnatha
- Class: †Conodonta; Pander, 1856

Subgroups
- Cavidonti; Belodellida?; Proconodontida; Conodonti; Protopanderodontida (paraphyletic); Panderodontida; Prioniodontida; Prioniodinida; Ozarkodinida

Synonyms
- †Conodontophorida Eichenberg, 1930; †Euconodonta

= Conodont =

Conodonts Temporal range: Middle Cambrian to Earliest Jurassic (Hettangian)

Extinct agnathan chordates resembling eels

Conodonts are an extinct group of marine jawless vertebrates belonging to the class Conodonta (from Ancient Greek κῶνος (kōnos), meaning "cone", and ὀδούς (odoús), meaning "tooth"). They are primarily known from their hard, mineralised tooth-like structures called "conodont elements" that in life were present in the oral cavity and used to process food. Rare soft tissue remains suggest that they had elongate eel-like bodies with large eyes. Conodonts were a long-lasting group with over 300 million years of existence from the Cambrian (over 500 million years ago) to the beginning of the Jurassic (around 200 million years ago). Conodont elements are highly distinctive to particular species and are widely used in biostratigraphy as indicative of particular periods of geological time.

== Discovery and understanding of conodonts ==
The teeth-like fossils of the conodont were first discovered by Heinz Christian Pander and the results published in Saint Petersburg, Russia, in 1856.

It was only in the early 1980s that the first fossil evidence of the rest of the animal was found (see below). In the 1990s exquisite fossils were found in South Africa in which the soft tissue had been converted to clay, preserving even muscle fibres. The presence of muscles for rotating the eyes showed definitively that the animals were primitive vertebrates.

=== Nomenclature and taxonomic rank ===
Through their history of study, "conodont" is a term which has been applied to both the individual fossils and to the animals to which they belonged. The original German term used by Pander was "conodonten", which was subsequently anglicized as "conodonts", though no formal latinized name was provided for several decades. MacFarlane (1923) described them as an order, Conodontes (a Greek translation), which Huddle (1934) altered to the Latin spelling Conodonta. A few years earlier, Eichenberg (1930) established another name for the animals responsible for conodont fossils: Conodontophorida ("conodont bearers"). A few other scientific names were rarely and inconsistently applied to conodonts and their proposed close relatives during 20th century, such as Conodontophoridia, Conodontophora, Conodontochordata, Conodontiformes, and Conodontomorpha.

Conodonta and Conodontophorida are by far the most common scientific names used to refer to conodonts, though inconsistencies regarding their taxonomic rank still persist. Bengtson (1976)'s research on conodont evolution identified three morphological tiers of early conodont-like fossils: protoconodonts, paraconodonts, and "true conodonts" (euconodonts). Further investigations revealed that protoconodonts were probably more closely related to chaetognaths (arrow worms) rather than true conodonts. On the other hand, paraconodonts are still considered a likely ancestral stock or sister group to euconodonts.

The 1981 Treatise on Invertebrate Paleontology volume on the conodonts (Part W revised, supplement 2) lists Conodonta as the name of both a phylum and a class, with Conodontophorida as a subordinate order for "true conodonts". All three ranks were attributed to Eichenberg, and Paraconodontida was also included as an order under Conodonta. This approach was criticized by Fåhraeus (1983), who argued that it overlooked Pander's historical relevance as a founder and primary figure in conodontology. Fåhraeus proposed to retain Conodonta as a phylum (attributed to Pander), with the single class Conodontata (Pander) and the single order Conodontophorida (Eichenberg). Subsequent authors continued to regard Conodonta as a phylum with an ever-increasing number of subgroups.

With increasingly strong evidence that conodonts lie within the phylum Chordata, more recent studies generally refer to "true conodonts" as the class Conodonta, containing multiple smaller orders. Paraconodonts are typically excluded from the group, though still regarded as close relatives. In practice, Conodonta, Conodontophorida, and Euconodonta are equivalent terms and are used interchangeably.

== Conodont elements ==
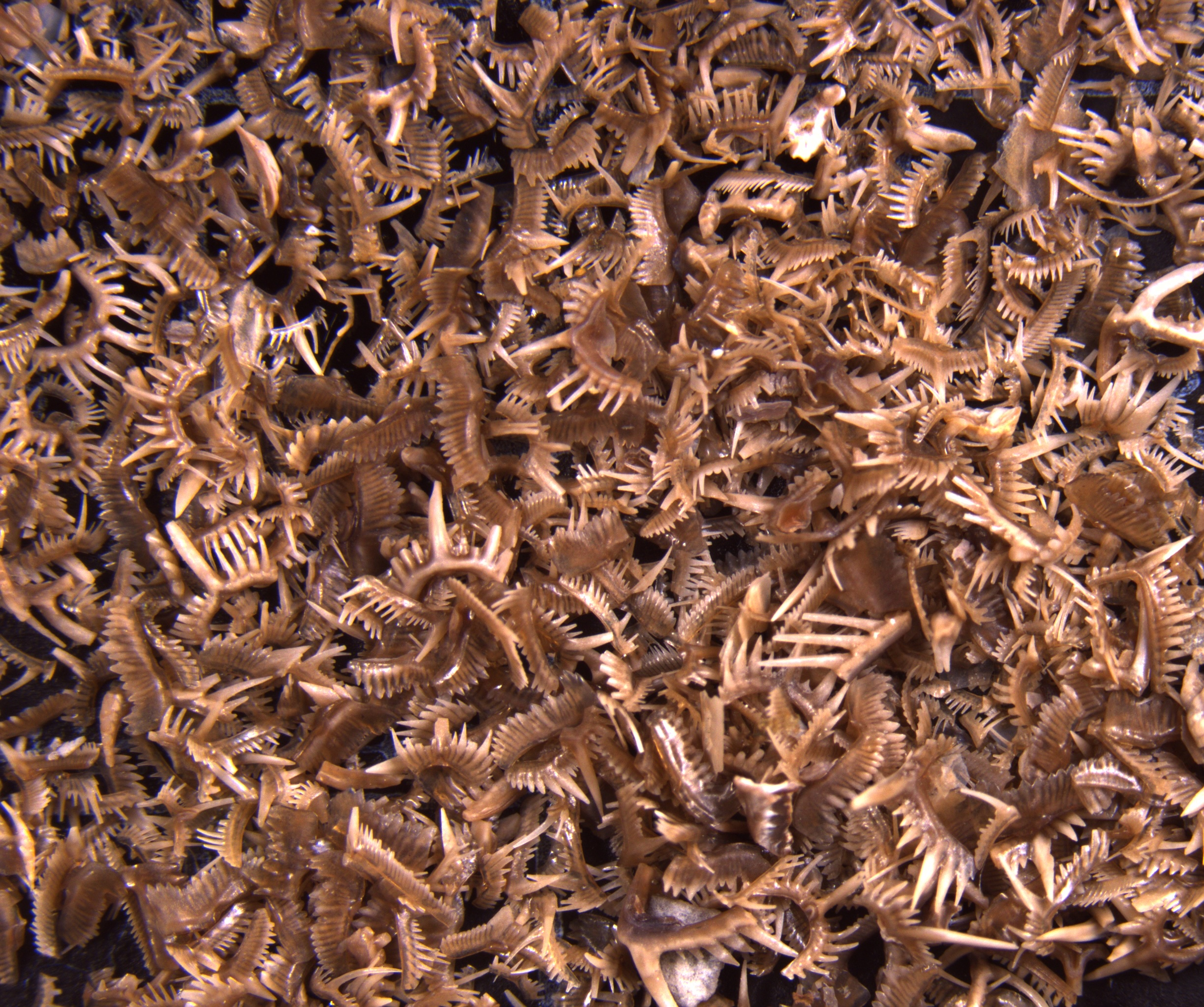
Conodont elements from the Silurian of Gotland, Sweden

For a long time, the function and arrangement of conodont elements was enigmatic, since the whole animal was soft-bodied, with the sole exception of the mineralized elements. Upon the conodont animal's demise, the soft tissues would decompose and the individual conodont elements would separate. However, in instances of exceptional preservation the conodont elements may be recovered in articulation. By closely observing these rare specimens, Briggs et al. (1983) were able to for the first time study the anatomy of the complexes formed by the conodont elements arranged as they were in life. Other researchers have continued to revise and reinterpret this initial description.

=== Lone elements ===
Conodont elements consist of mineralised teeth-like structures of varying morphology and complexity. The evolution of mineralized tissues has been puzzling for more than a century. It has been hypothesized that the first mechanism of chordate tissue mineralization began either in the oral skeleton of conodonts or the dermal skeleton of early agnathans.

The element array constituted a feeding apparatus that is radically different from the jaws of modern animals. They are now termed "conodont elements" to avoid confusion. The three forms of teeth, i.e., coniform cones, ramiform bars, and pectiniform platforms, probably performed different functions.

For many years, conodonts were known only from enigmatic tooth-like microfossils (200 micrometers to 5 millimeters in length), which occur commonly, but not always, in isolation and were not associated with any other fossil. Until the early 1980s, conodont teeth had not been found in association with fossils of the host organism, in a konservat lagerstätte. This is because the conodont animal was soft-bodied, thus everything but the teeth was unsuited for preservation under normal circumstances.

These microfossils are made of hydroxylapatite (a phosphatic mineral). The conodont elements can be extracted from rock using adequate solvents.

They are widely used in biostratigraphy. Conodont elements are also used as paleothermometers, a proxy for thermal alteration in the host rock, because under higher temperatures, the phosphate undergoes predictable and permanent color changes, measured with the conodont alteration index. This has made them useful for petroleum exploration where they are known, in rocks dating from the Cambrian to the Late Triassic.

=== Full apparatus ===
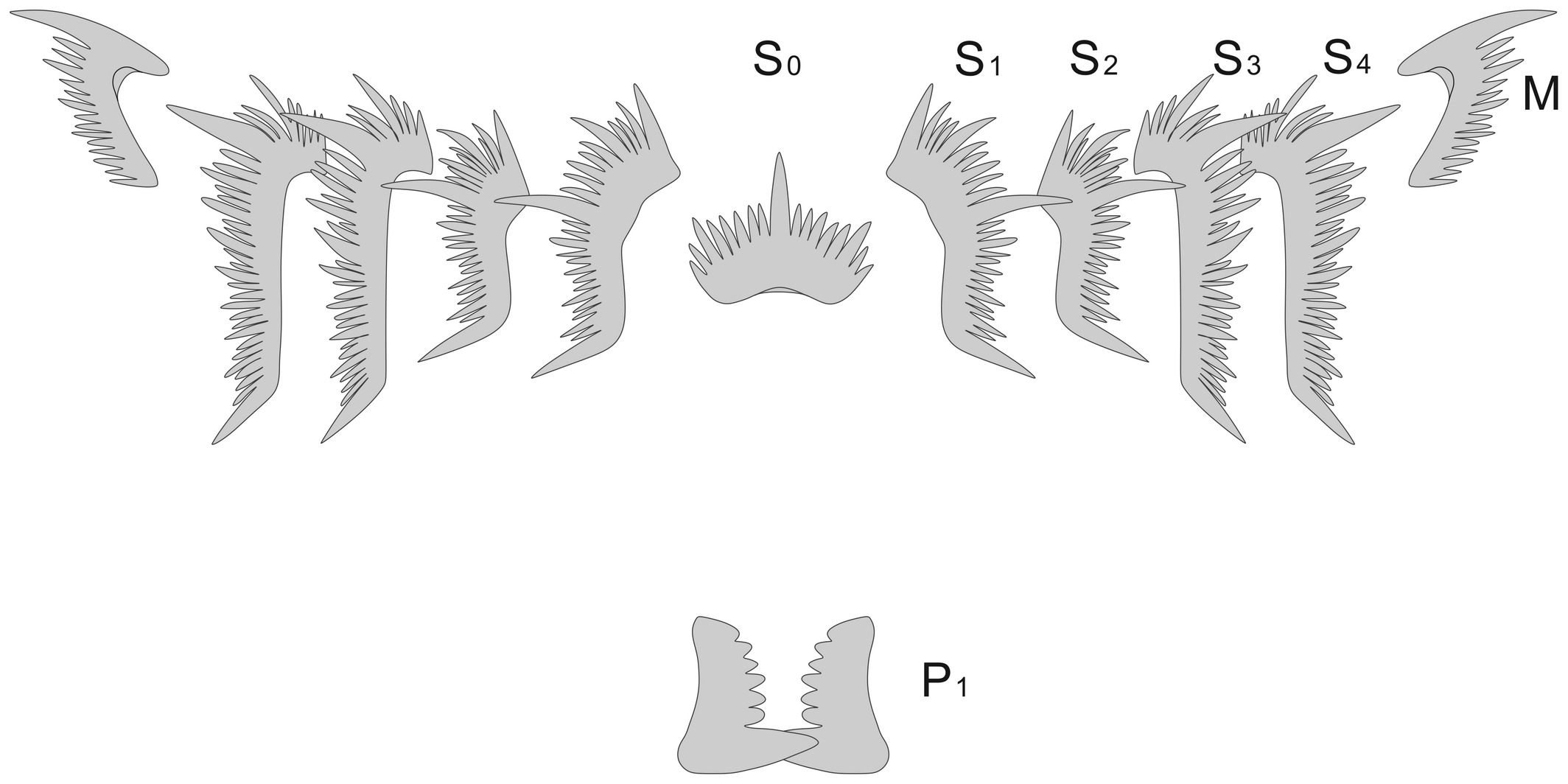
Complete element set of the conodont Hindeodus parvus

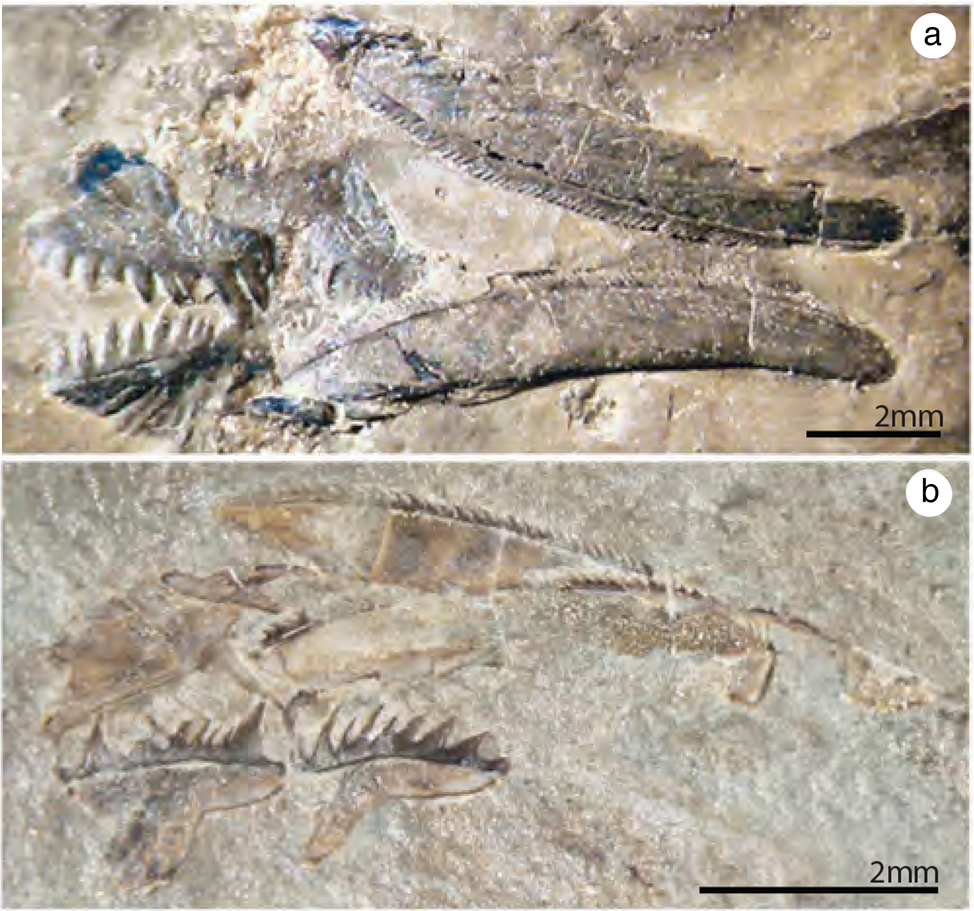
Preserved articulated association of conodont elements belonging to the species Archeognathus primus (Ordovician, North America)

The conodont apparatus may comprise a number of discrete elements, including the spathognathiform, ozarkodiniform, trichonodelliform, neoprioniodiform, and other forms.

In the 1930s, the concept of conodont assemblages was described by Hermann Schmidt and by Harold W. Scott in 1934.

==== Element types ====
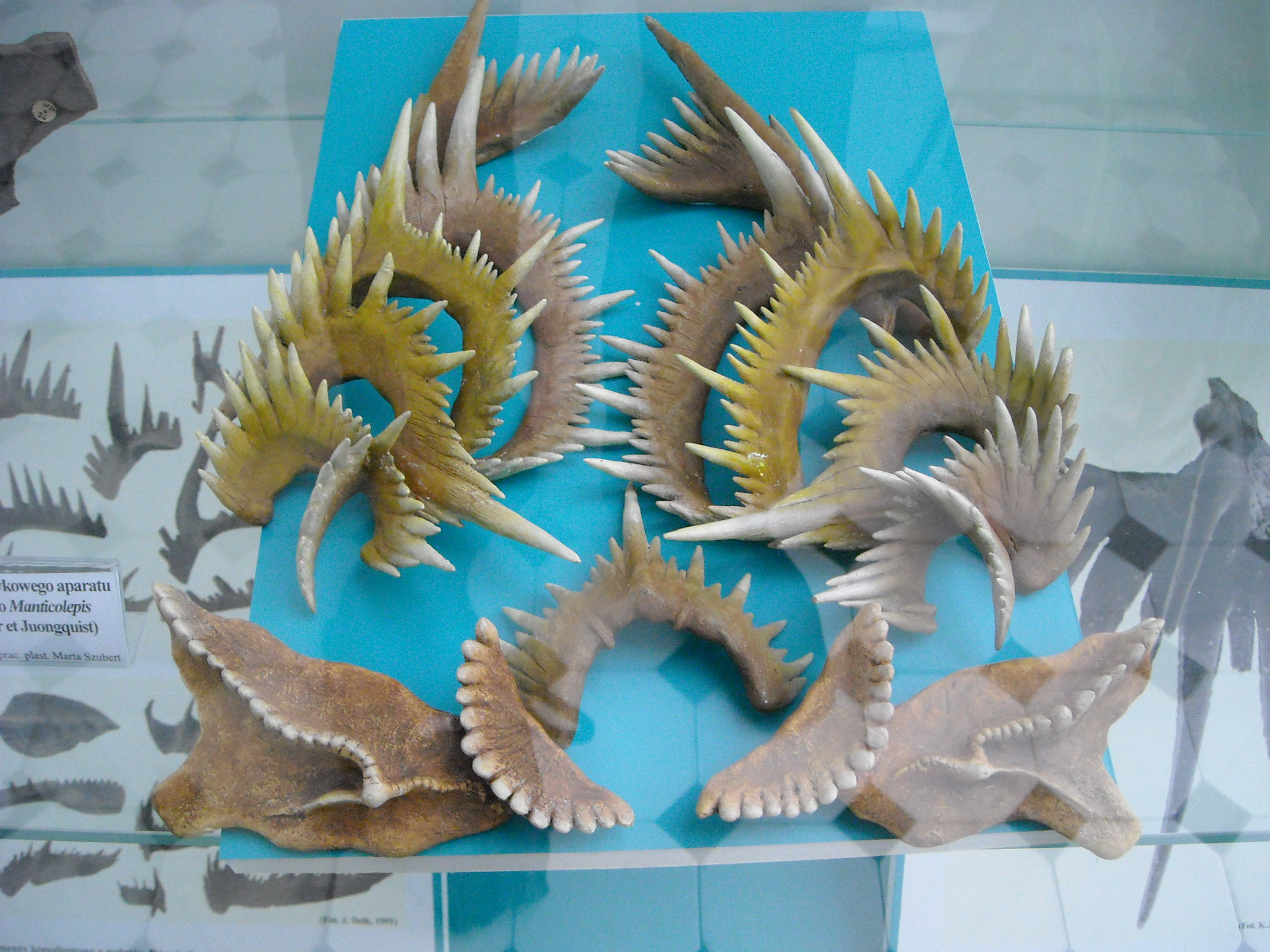
Model of elements of Manticolepis subrecta – a conodont from the Upper Frasnian of Poland – photography taken in the Geological Museum of the Polish Geological Institute in Warsaw

The arrangement of elements in ozarkodinids and other complex conodonts was first reconstructed from extremely well-preserved taxa by Briggs et al. (1983), although loosely articulated conodont elements are reported as early as 1971. Conodont elements are organized into three different groups based upon shape. These groups of shapes are termed S, M, and P elements.

The S and M elements are ramiform, elongate, and comb-like structures. An individual element has a single row of many cusps running down the midline along its top side. These conodont elements are arranged towards the animal's anterior oral surface, forming an interlocking basket of cusps within the mouth. Cusp may point out towards the head of the animal, or back towards the tail. The number of S and M elements present as well as the direction they point may vary by taxonomic group. M (makellate) elements have a higher position in the mouth and commonly form a symmetrical shape akin to a horseshoe or pick. S elements are further divided into three subtypes:

- S_{a} element - an unpaired symmetrical ramiform structure at the front of the mouth. Sometimes known as an S_{0} element.
- S_{b} element - paired asymmetrical structures
- S_{c} element - paired highly asymmetrical, bipennate structures

In P elements, a pectiniform (comb-shaped) row of cusps transitions into a broad flat or ridged platform moving towards the base of the element. Platforms and cusps are only found along one side of the structure. Individual elements oriented vertically and arranged in pairs, with platforms and cusps pointing towards the animal's midline. They occur deeper in the throat than the S and M elements. P elements are further divided into two subtypes:

- P_{a} element - blade-like structures
- P_{b} element - arched structures

== The conodont animal ==
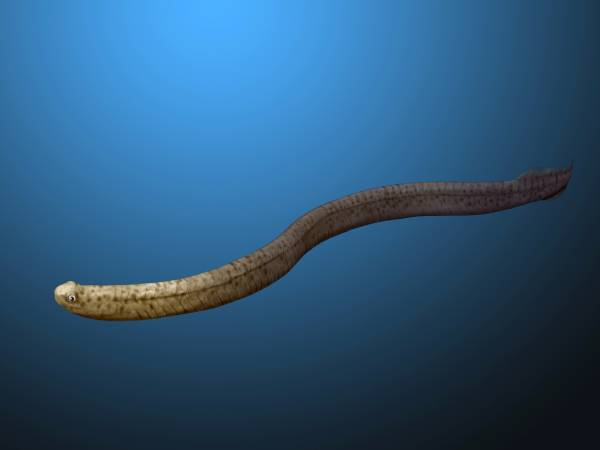
Life restoration of Promissum pulchrum

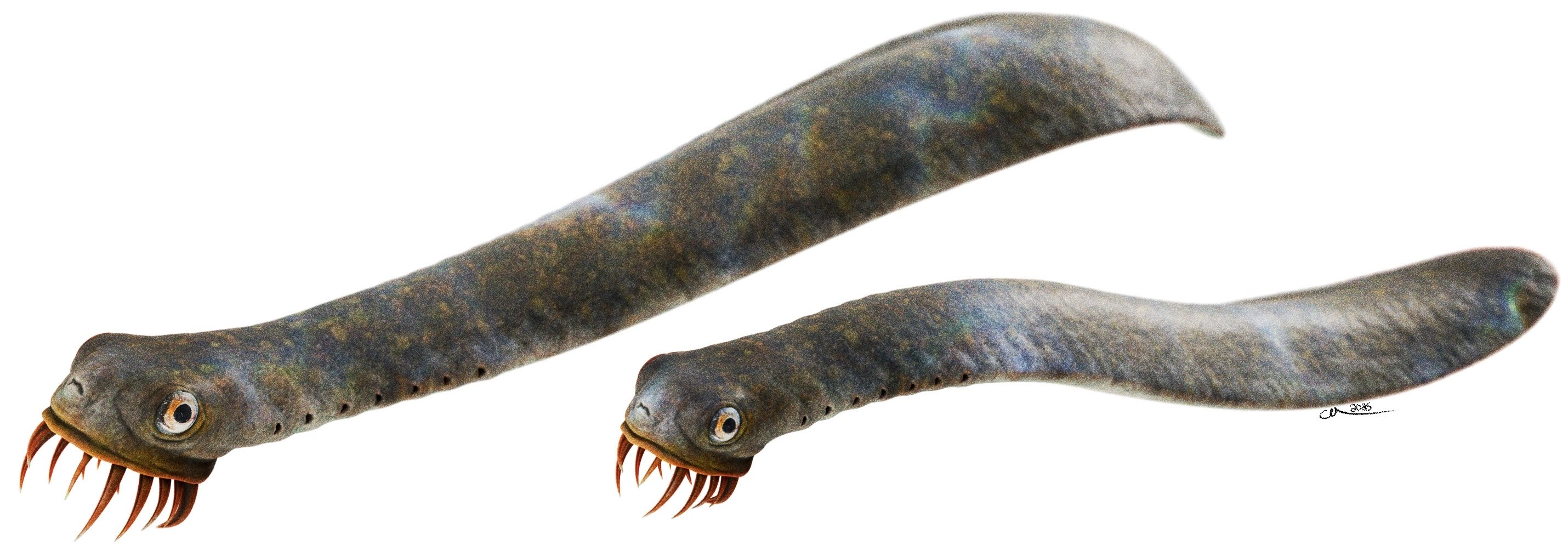
Restoration of Panderodus unicostatus

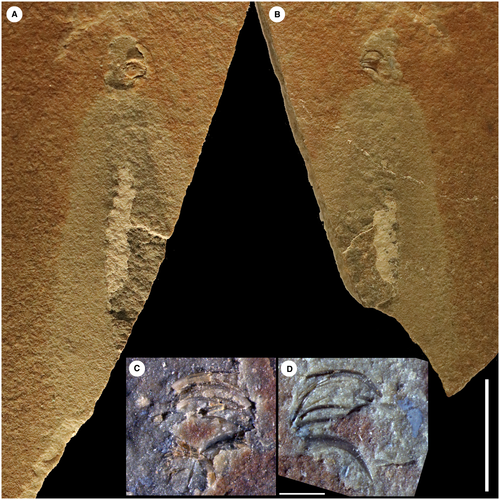
A body fossil of Panderodus unicostatus

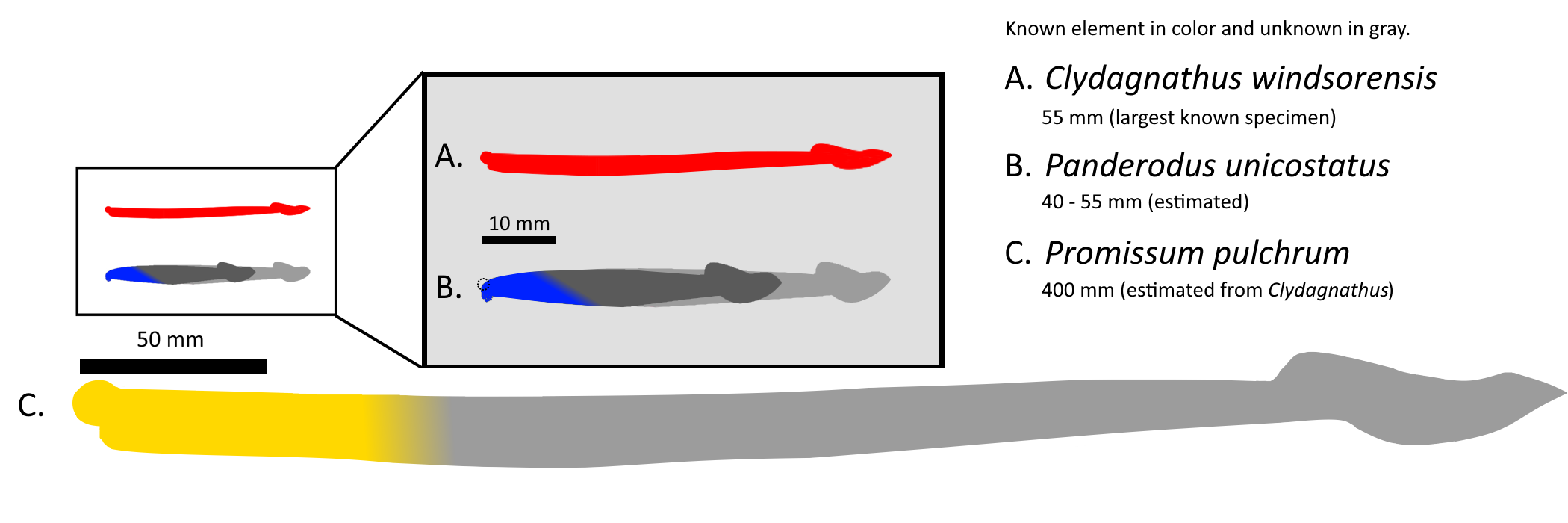
A size comparison of the three conodont species with preserved body fossils.

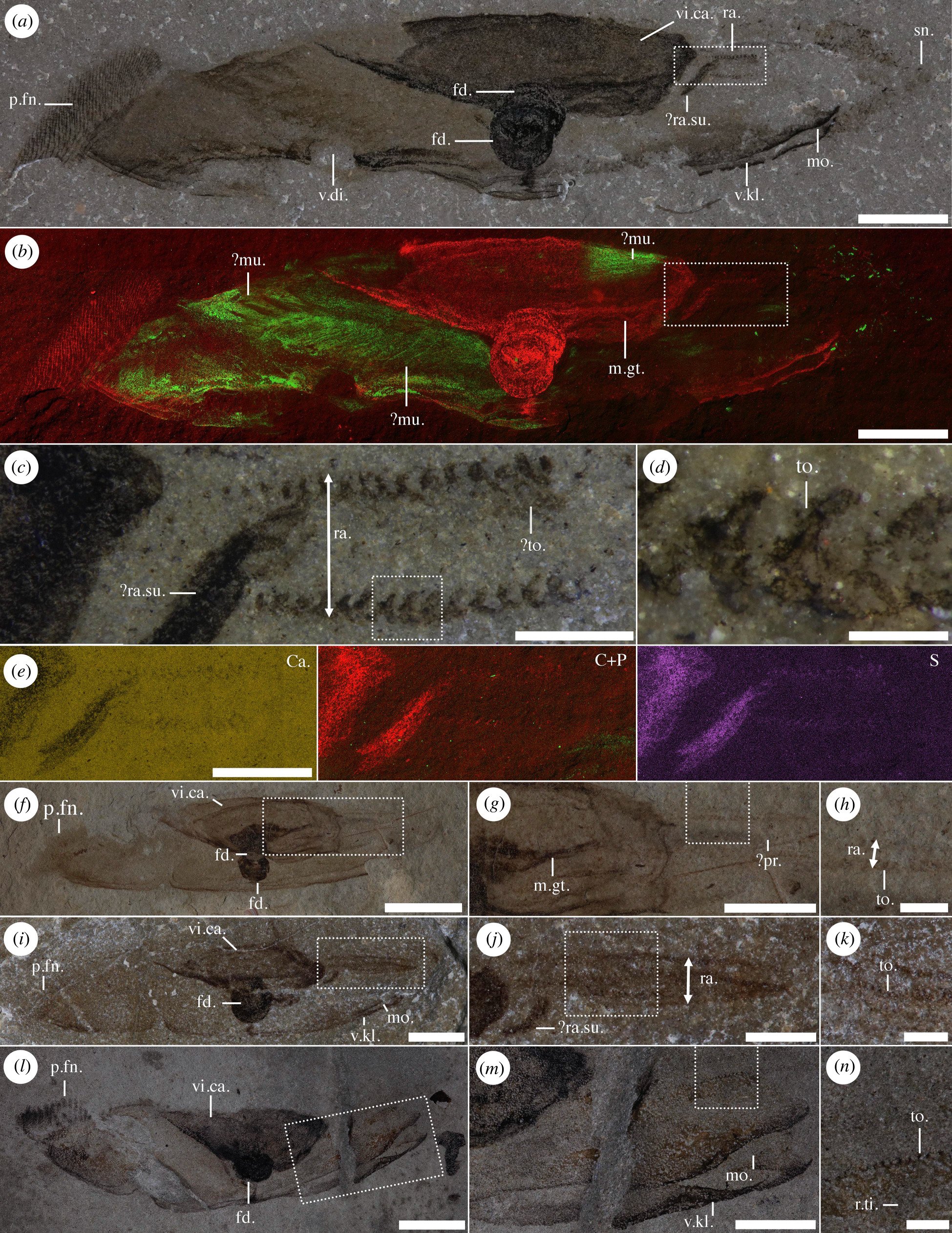
Fossils of Typhloesus, originally considered to be the first conodont body fossil.

Although conodont elements are abundant in the fossil record, fossils preserving soft tissues of conodont animals are known from only a few deposits in the world. One of the first possible body fossils of a conodont were those of Typhloesus, an enigmatic animal known from the Bear Gulch limestone in Montana. This possible identification was based on the presence of conodont elements with the fossils of Typhloesus. This claim was disproved, however, as the conodont elements were actually in the creature's digestive area. That animal is now regarded as a possible mollusk related to gastropods. As of 2023, there are only three described species of conodonts that have preserved trunk fossils: Clydagnathus windsorensis from the Carboniferous aged Granton Shrimp Bed in Scotland, Promissum pulchrum from the Ordovician aged Soom Shale in South Africa, and Panderodus unicostatus from the Silurian aged Waukesha Biota in Wisconsin. There are other examples of conodont animals that only preserve the head region, including eyes, of the animals known from the Silurian aged Eramosa site in Ontario and Triassic aged Akkamori section in Japan.

According to these fossils, conodonts had large eyes, fins with fin rays, chevron-shaped muscles and axial line, which were interpreted as notochord or the dorsal nerve cord. While Clydagnathus and Panderodus had lengths only reaching 4–5 cm (1.6–2.0 in), Promissum is estimated to reach 40 cm (16 in) in length, if it had the same proportions as Clydagnathus.

== Ecology ==
=== Diet ===
Because they are associated with the oral region of the conodont animal, it is accepted that conodont elements are used in the acquisition of food. Two primary hypotheses have arisen as to how this is accomplished. One hypothesis proposed that elements acted as support structures for filamentous soft-tissues. These small filaments (cilia) would be used to filter small planktonic organisms out of the water column, analogous to the cnidoblast cells of a coral or the lophophore of a brachiopod.

Another hypothesis contests that the conodont elements were used to actively catch and process prey. S and M elements could have been independently movable, allowing prey to be captured in the oral region of the animal. Modern hagfish and lampreys scrape at flesh using keratinous blades supported by a simple but effective pulley-like system, involving a string of muscles around a cartilaginous core. An equivalent system might have been present in conodonts. S and M elements would be able to open and close at will to firmly grasp or pinch at prey, before rotating back to consume the prey element. The blade-like P elements deeper in the throat would process the food by slicing against their counterparts like a pair of scissors, or grinding against each other like molar teeth.

Current consensus supports the latter hypothesis in which elements are used for predation, not suspension feeding. One line of evidence for this includes the isometric growth pattern exhibited by S, M, and P elements. If the conodont animal relied upon a filter feeding strategy then this growth pattern would not provide the necessary surface area needed to support ciliated tissue as the animal grew. There is some evidence for cartilaginous structures similar to those present in modern jawless fish, which are both predators and scavengers. Wear on some conodont elements suggests that they functioned like teeth, with both wear marks likely created by food as well as by occlusion with other elements.

It is possible that multiple feeding strategies may have arisen in different groups of conodonts, as they are a diverse clade. A 2009 paper suggested that the genus Panderodus may have utilized venom in the acquisition of prey. Evidence of longitudinal grooves are present on some conodont elements associated with the feeding apparatus of this particular animal. These sorts of grooves are analogous to those present in some extant groups of venomous vertebrates.

=== Lifestyle ===
Studies have concluded that conodonts taxa occupied both pelagic (open ocean) and nektobenthic (swimming above the sediment surface) niches. The preserved musculature suggests that some conodonts (Promissum at least) were efficient cruisers, but incapable of bursts of speed. Based on isotopic evidence, some Devonian conodonts have been proposed to have been low-level consumers that fed on zooplankton.

A study on the population dynamics of Alternognathus has been published. Among other things, it demonstrates that at least this taxon had short lifespans lasting around a month. A study Sr/Ca and Ba/Ca ratios of a population of conodonts from a carbonate platform from the Silurian of Sweden found that the different conodont species and genera likely occupied different trophic niches.

== Classification and phylogeny ==
=== Affinities ===
As of 2012, scientists classify the conodonts in the phylum Chordata on the basis of their fins with fin rays, chevron-shaped muscles and notochord.

Milsom and Rigby envision them as vertebrates similar in appearance to modern hagfish and lampreys, and phylogenetic analysis suggests they are more derived than either of these groups. However, this analysis comes with one caveat: the earliest conodont-like fossils, the protoconodonts, appear to form a distinct clade from the later paraconodonts and euconodonts. Protoconodonts are probably not relatives of true conodonts, but likely represent a stem group to Chaetognatha, an unrelated phylum that includes arrow worms.

Moreover, some analyses do not regard conodonts as either vertebrates or craniates, because they lack the main characteristics of these groups. More recently it has been proposed that conodonts may be stem-cyclostomes, more closely related to hagfish and lampreys than to jawed vertebrates, based on similarities in the shape of their fins, and the idea that the conodont elements may be homologous with lamprey and hagfish tooth plates.

=== Ingroup relations ===
Individual conodont elements are difficult to classify in a consistent manner, but an increasing number of conodont species are now known from multi-element assemblages, which offer more data to infer how different conodont lineages are related to each other. The following is a simplified cladogram based on Sweet and Donoghue (2001), which summarized previous work by Sweet (1988) and Donoghue et al. (2000):

- - Paraconodontida
  - †Conodonta
    - Cavidonti / Proconodontida
    - Conodonti
      - - Protopanderodontida
        - Panderontida
      - Prioniodontida
        - Paracordylodus
        - - Balognathidae
          - - Prioniodinida
            - Ozarkodinida

Only a few studies approach the question of conodont ingroup relationships from a cladistic perspective, as informed by phylogenetic analyses. One of the broadest studies of this nature was the analysis of Donoghue et al. (2008), which focused on "complex" conodonts (Prioniodontida and other descendant groups):

== Evolutionary history ==
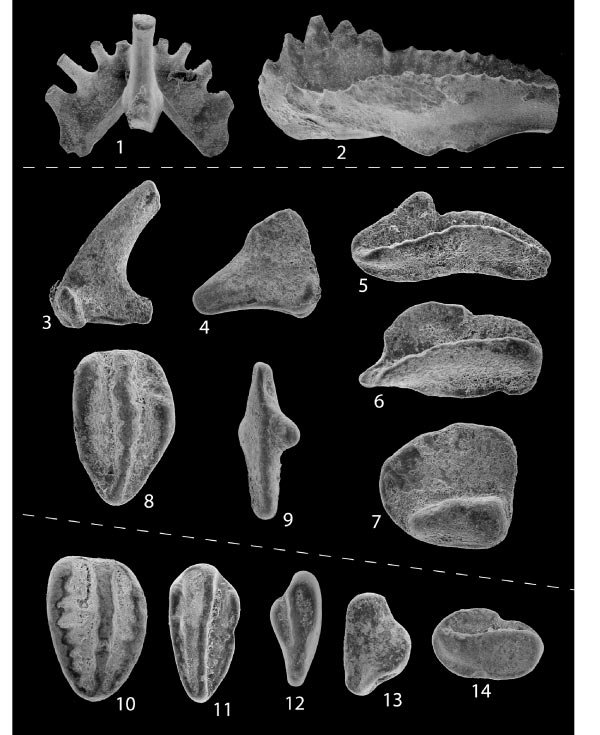
Conodont elements from the Deer Valley Member of the Mauch Chunk Formation in Pennsylvania, Maryland, and West Virginia, US detail Figures 1, 2. Conodonts from the Deer Valley Member of the Mauch Chunk Formation, Keystone quarry, Pa. This collection (93RS–79c) is from the lower 10 cm of the Deer Valley Member. Note the nonabraded, although slightly broken, conodont elements of the high-energy oolitic marine facies of the Deer Valley Member.: 1. Kladognathus sp., Sa element, posterior view, X140 2. Cavusgnathus unicornis, gamma morphotype, Pa element, lateral view, X140; 3–9. Conodonts from the uppermost Loyalhanna Limestone Member of the Mauch Chunk Formation, Keystone quarry, Pa. This collection (93RS–79b) is from the upper 10 cm of the Loyalhanna Member. Note the highly abraded and reworked aeolian forms. 3, 4. Kladognathus sp., Sa element, lateral views, X140: 5. Cavusgnathus unicornis, alpha morphotype, Pa element, lateral view, X140; 6, 7. Cavusgnathus sp., Pa element, lateral view, X140: 8. Polygnathus sp., Pa element, upper view, reworked Late Devonian to Early Mississippian morphotype, X140; 9. Gnathodus texanus?, Pa element, upper view, X140; 10–14. Conodonts from the basal 20 cm of the Loyalhanna Limestone Member of the Mauch Chunk Formation, Keystone quarry, Pa. (93RS–79a), and Westernport, Md. (93RS–67), note the highly abraded and reworked aeolian forms: 10. Polygnathus sp., Pa element, upper view, reworked Late Devonian to Early Mississippian morphotype, 93RS–79a, X140; 11. Polygnathus sp., Pa element, upper view, reworked Late Devonian to Early Mississippian morphotype, 93RS–67, X140; 12. Gnathodus sp., Pa element, upper view, reworked Late Devonian(?) through Mississippian morphotype, 93RS–67, X140; 13. Kladognathus sp., M element, lateral views, 93RS–67, X140; 14. Cavusgnathus sp., Pa element, lateral view, 93RS–67, X140

The earliest fossils of conodonts are known from the Cambrian period. Conodonts extensively diversified during the early Ordovician, reaching their apex of diversity during the middle part of the period, and experienced a sharp decline during the late Ordovician and Silurian, before reaching another peak of diversity during the mid-late Devonian. Conodont diversity declined during the Carboniferous, with an extinction event at the end of the middle Tournaisian and a prolonged period of significant loss of diversity during the Pennsylvanian. Only a handful of conodont genera were present during the Permian, though diversity increased after the P-T extinction during the Early Triassic.

Diversity continued to decline during the Middle and Late Triassic, culminating in their extinction soon after the Triassic-Jurassic boundary. Much of their diversity during the Paleozoic was likely controlled by sea levels and temperature, with the major declines during the Late Ordovician and Late Carboniferous due to cooler temperatures, especially glacial events and associated marine regressions which reduced continental shelf area. However, their final demise is more likely related to biotic interactions, perhaps competition with new Mesozoic taxa.

== Taxonomy ==
Conodonta taxonomy based on Sweet (1988), Sweet & Donoghue (2001), and Mikko's Phylogeny Archive.

- Class Conodonta Pander, 1856 [Conodontophorida Eichenberg, 1930; "euconodonts" Bengtson, 1976]
  - Cavidonti Sweet, 1988
    - Order Belodellida? Sweet, 1988
      - Ansellidae? Fåhraeus & Hunter, 1985
      - Belodellidae Khodalevich & Tschernich, 1973
      - Dapsilodontidae? Sweet, 1988
    - Order Proconodontida Sweet, 1988
      - Cordylodontidae Lindström, 1970
      - Fryxellodontidae Miller, 1981
      - Pseudooneotodidae? Wang & Aldridge, 2010
      - Proconodontidae Lindström, 1970
      - Pygodontidae? Bergstrom, 1981
  - Conodonti Pander, 1856 non Branson, 1938
    - Order Protopanderodontida Sweet, 1988
      - Acanthodontidae Lindström, 1970
      - Clavohamulidae Lindström, 1970
      - Drepanoistodontidae? Fåhraeus, 1978 [Distacodontidae Bassler, 1925]
      - Protopanderodontidae Lindström, 1970 [Scolopodontidae Bergström, 1981; Oneotodontidae Miller, 1981; Teridontidae Miller, 1981]
      - Serratognathidae? Zhen et al., 2009
      - Strachanognathidae? Bergström, 1981 [Cornuodontidae Stouge, 1984]
    - Order Panderodontida Sweet, 1988
      - Panderodontidae Lindström, 1970
    - Order Prioniodontida Dzik, 1976 (paraphyletic)
      - Acodontidae? Dzik, 1993 [Tripodontinae Sweet, 1988]
      - Cahabagnathidae? Stouge & Bagnoli 1999
      - Distacodontidae? Bassler, 1925 emend. Ulrich & Bassler, 1926 [Drepanodontinae Fåhraeus & Nowlan, 1978; Lonchodininae Hass, 1959]
      - Gamachignathidae? Wang & Aldridge, 2010
      - Jablonnodontidae? Dzik, 2006
      - Nurrellidae? Pomešano-Cherchi, 1967
      - Paracordylodontidae? Bergström, 1981
      - Playfordiidae? Dzik, 2002
      - Ulrichodinidae? Bergström, 1981
      - Rossodus Repetski & Ethington, 1983
      - Multioistodontidae Harris, 1964 [Dischidognathidae]
      - Oistodontidae Lindström, 1970 [Juanognathidae Bergström, 1981]
      - Periodontidae Lindström, 1970
      - Rhipidognathidae Lindström, 1970 sensu Sweet, 1988
      - Prioniodontidae Bassler, 1925
      - Phragmodontidae Bergström, 1981 [Cyrtoniodontinae Hass, 1959]
      - Plectodinidae Sweet, 1988
      - Pygodontidae? Bergstrom, 1981
      - Icriodontacea
        - Balognathidae (Hass, 1959)
        - Polyplacognathidae Bergström, 1981
        - Distomodontidae Klapper, 1981
        - Icriodellidae Sweet, 1988
        - Icriodontidae Müller & Müller, 1957
      - Order Prioniodinida Sweet, 1988
        - Oepikodontidae? Bergström, 1981
        - Xaniognathidae? Sweet, 1981
        - Chirognathidae Branson & Mehl, 1944
        - Prioniodinidae Bassler, 1925 [Hibbardellidae Mueller, 1956]
        - Bactrognathidae Lindström, 1970
        - Ellisoniidae Clark, 1972
        - Gondolellidae Lindström, 1970
      - Order Ozarkodinida Dzik, 1976 [Polygnathida]
        - Anchignathodontidae? Clark, 1972
        - Archeognathidae? Miller, 1969
        - Belodontidae? Huddle, 1934
        - Coleodontidae? Branson & Mehl, 1944 [Hibbardellidae Müller, 1956; Loxodontidae]
        - Eognathodontidae? Bardashev, Weddige & Ziegler, 2002
        - Francodinidae? Dzik, 2006
        - Gladigondolellidae? (Hirsch, 1994) [Sephardiellinae Plasencia, Hirsch & Márquez-Aliaga, 2007; Neogondolellinae Hirsch, 1994; Cornudininae Orchard, 2005; Epigondolellinae Orchard, 2005; Marquezellinae Plasencia et al., 2018; Paragondolellinae Orchard, 2005; Pseudofurnishiidae Ramovs, 1977]
        - Iowagnathidae? Liu et al., 2017
        - Novispathodontidae? (Orchard, 2005)
        - Trucherognathidae? Branson & Mehl, 1944
        - Vjalovognathidae? Shen, Yuan & Henderson, 2015
        - Wapitiodontidae? Orchard, 2005
        - Cryptotaxidae Klapper & Philip, 1971
        - Spathognathodontidae Hass, 1959 [Ozarkodinidae Dzik, 1976]
        - Pterospathodontidae Cooper, 1977 [Carniodontidae]
        - Kockelellidae Klapper, 1981 [Caenodontontidae]
        - Polygnathidae Bassler, 1925 [?Eopolygnathidae Bardashev, Weddige & Ziegler, 2002]
        - Palmatolepidae Sweet, 1988
        - Hindeodontidae (Hass, 1959)
        - Elictognathidae Austin & Rhodes, 1981
        - Gnathodontidae Sweet, 1988
        - Idiognathodontidae Harris & Hollingsworth, 1933
        - Mestognathidae Austin & Rhodes, 1981
        - Cavusgnathidae Austin & Rhodes, 1981
        - Sweetognathidae Ritter, 1986

== See also ==
- Timeline of the evolutionary history of life
- Micropaleontology
- List of conodont genera
- Conodont biostratigraphy
- Conodont alteration index
