= Ozarkodinida =

Scientific classification
- Kingdom: Animalia
- Phylum: Chordata
- Infraphylum: Agnatha
- Class: †Conodonta
- Clade: †Prioniodontida
- Order: †Ozarkodinida; Dzik 1976

Families
- Anchignathodontidae Clark, 1972; Cavusgnathidae Austin & Rhodes, 1981; Cryptotaxidae Klapper & Philip, 1971; Elictognathidae Austin & Rhodes, 1981; Gnathodontidae Sweet, 1988; Gondolellidae Lindstrom, 1970; Idiognathodontidae Harris & Hollingsworth, 1933; Kockelellidae Klapper, 1981; Mestognathidae Austin & Rhodes, 1981; Palmatolepidae Sweet, 1988; Polygnathidae Bassler, 1925; Pterospathodontidae Cooper, 1977; Spathognathodontidae Hass, 1959; Sweetognathidae Ritter, 1986

Synonyms
- Polygnathida Barskov, 1995

Extinct order of conodonts

Ozarkodinida is an extinct conodont order. It is part of the clade Prioniodontida, also known as the "complex conodonts".

== Name ==
Ozarkodinida is named after the Ozark Mountains of Missouri, United States.

== Elements ==
The feeding apparatus of ozarkodinids is composed at the front of an axial Sa element, flanked by two groups of four close-set elongate Sb and Sc elements which were inclined obliquely inwards and forwards. Above these elements lay a pair of arched and inward pointing (makellate) M elements. Behind the S-M array lay transversely oriented and bilaterally opposed (pectiniform, i.e. comb-shaped) Pb and Pa elements.
