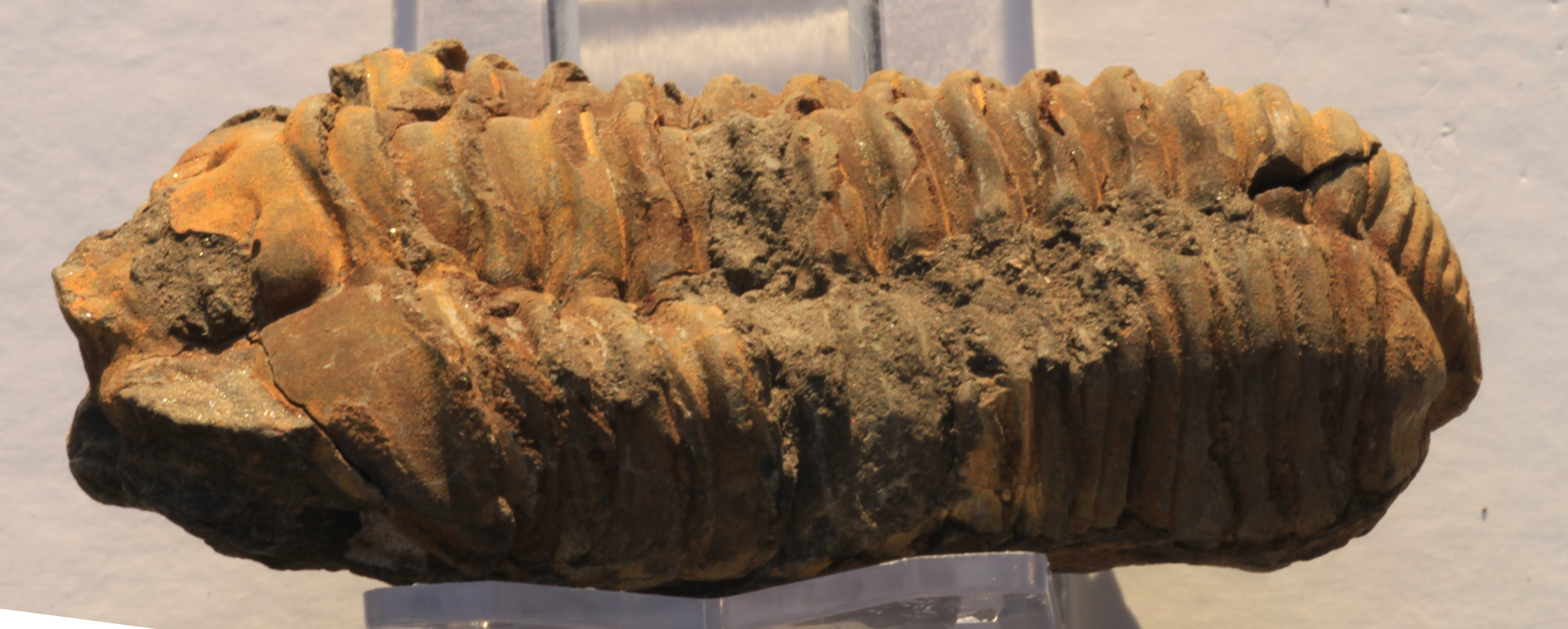
- Diacalymene gabrielsi from Sommerset Island, Canada

Scientific classification
- Kingdom: Animalia
- Phylum: Arthropoda
- Clade: †Artiopoda
- Class: †Trilobita
- Order: †Phacopida
- Family: †Calymenidae
- Genus: †Diacalymene; Kegel, 1927

Type species
- Calymene diademata Barrande, 1846

= Diacalymene =

Diacalymene Temporal range: Late Ordovician-Silurian ~445.6–418.7 Ma

Extinct genus of trilobites

Diacalymene is a genus of trilobite from the order Phacopida, suborder Calymenina. It includes the species D. clavicula, D. diademata and D. gabrielsi. It lived in the Ordovician and Silurian periods.

== Distribution ==
Fossils of the genus have been found in:

Ordovician

- Cabano, Jupiter and White Head Formations, Quebec, Canada
- Dufton Shale, United Kingdom

Silurian

- Lipeón Formation, Argentina
- Cariy Sandstone, Paraguay
- Motol and Zelkovice Formations, Czech Republic
- Henryhouse Formation and St. Clair Limestone, United States
