= Mingan Archipelago National Park Reserve =

National park reserve in Quebec, Canada

- IUCN category II (national park)
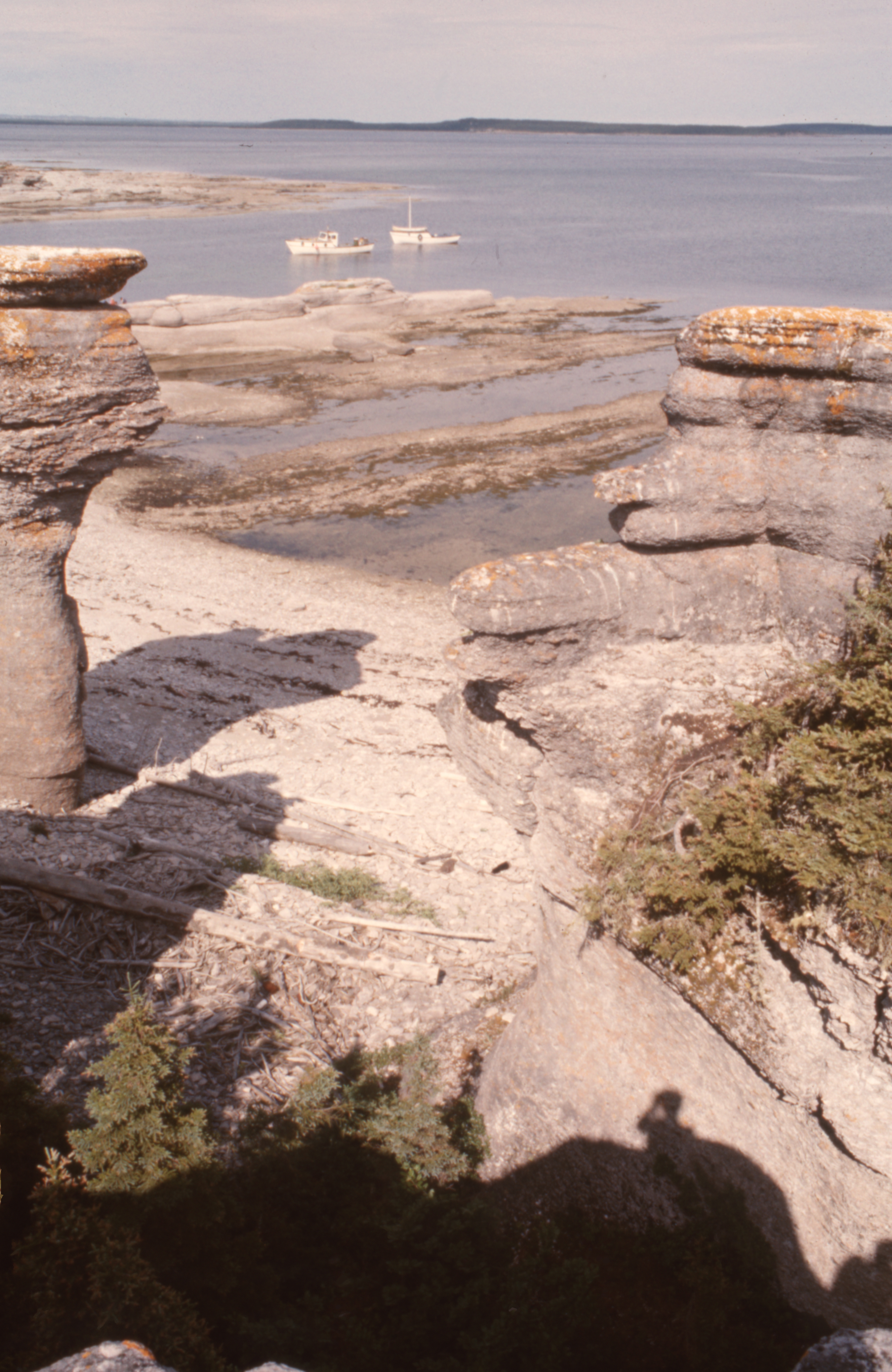
- Niapiskau island, boats at anchor in a bay, limestone monoliths, Gulf of St. Lawrence

- Location within Canada Location within Quebec
- Interactive map of Mingan Archipelago National Park Reserve
- Location: Havre-Saint-Pierre / Longue-Pointe-de-Mingan, Minganie Regional County Municipality, Quebec, Canada
- Nearest city: Sept-Îles, Quebec
- Coordinates: 50°13′N 63°10′W
- Area: 151 km^{2} (58 sq mi)
- Established: 1984
- Visitors: 44,017 (in 2022–23)
- Governing body: Parks Canada

Patrimoine culturel du Québec
- Official name: Site patrimonial de l'Archipel-de-Mingan
- Type: Declared heritage site
- Designated: 1978-11-15

Mingan Archipelago National Park Reserve or Mingan Archipelago Heritage Site bathes in the waters of the Gulf of St. Lawrence, in the administrative region of Côte-Nord, in Minganie RCM, Havre-Saint-Pierre municipality, facing Anticosti Island.

Accessible by sea or by air, the reserve protects a thousand islands, islets of rocks, cays and limestone reefs in a mosaic of several ecosystems coexisting on small island surfaces.

The reserve is home to the largest concentration of erosion monoliths in Canada, important fossil sites, unique ecological environments, alpine arctic flora including the Mingan thistle, and seabirds, containing the largest concentrations of Arctic terns, Common terns and Common eiders on the St. Lawrence river.

== Geology ==
The area of the Mingan islands and part of the mainland to the north is underlain by Ordovician sedimentary rocks. The Mingan Islands sequence is composed of two formations — the Romaine below and the Mingan above.

The exposed parts of the Romaine formation consist of dolomite and some shale. There may be a sandstone at the base. Beds are generally thick and rough in appearance, and in some places they appear kneaded together. The thickness is placed at about 260 feet.

The Mingan formation is composed of conglomerate, sandstone, and shale. These clastic strata are overlain by limestones. These strata contain much fragmentary fossil material and locally are poorly cemented. The larger part of the formation consists of finegrained limestones of which some have semi-lithographic texture. Fossils are locally common and frequently abundant. The exposed thickness is estimated not to exceed 155 feet.

The Mingan Archipelago is a major historical heritage site in Quebec; It is also a mid-Nordic natural environment with some original bio-physical elements: Ordovician limestone, cuestas, morphogenesis associated with the sea, subarctic vegetation cover and varied bird fauna. The construction of Highway 138 in 1976 opened up this fragile and unprotected land. In 1979, the author of The Mingan Archipelago: A Mid-Nordic Space Between Exploitation and Conservation, proposed that this archipelago become a park for conservation and extensive recreation, which was done in 1984.

== Flora ==
With the exception of the covered area just behind the village, the area of Havre Saint-Pierre is mainly covered by large spruce forests and a few laricinin farms. White spruce, Dwarf birch, Rough alder, Quaking aspen can also be seen.

Brothers Marie-Victorin and Rolland Germain F.E.C. explored the region from 1924 to 1928. Their work has raised awareness in the scientific community of the enormous value of the Mingan Archipelago. Since then, other scientists have added to the ecology and phytogeography knowledge of this sector.

The vegetation of the Mingan Islands belongs to the Chibougamau-Natashquan boreal forest region, which is dominated by Black spruce. The high latitude and low altitude, combined with the proximity of the cold currents of Labrador, explain the subarctic vegetation specific to the Minganie.

The entirely calcareous nature of the horizontal stratified rocks, which make up the Anticosti - Minganie, exerts a profound influence on the structure of the flora and on the choice of species.

Remarkable for its richness, the flora includes 350 vascular plants including the presence of two rare taxa: Cirsium foliosum var. Minganense and Cypripedium passerinum var. Minganense. Sixty species are new to the list of Minganie harvests compiled by Marie-Victorin and Rolland-Germain (1969). There were also 150 bryophytes and 152 lichens, 29 of which were additions to the Nouveau Catalogue des lichens, published by Lepage (1972). '

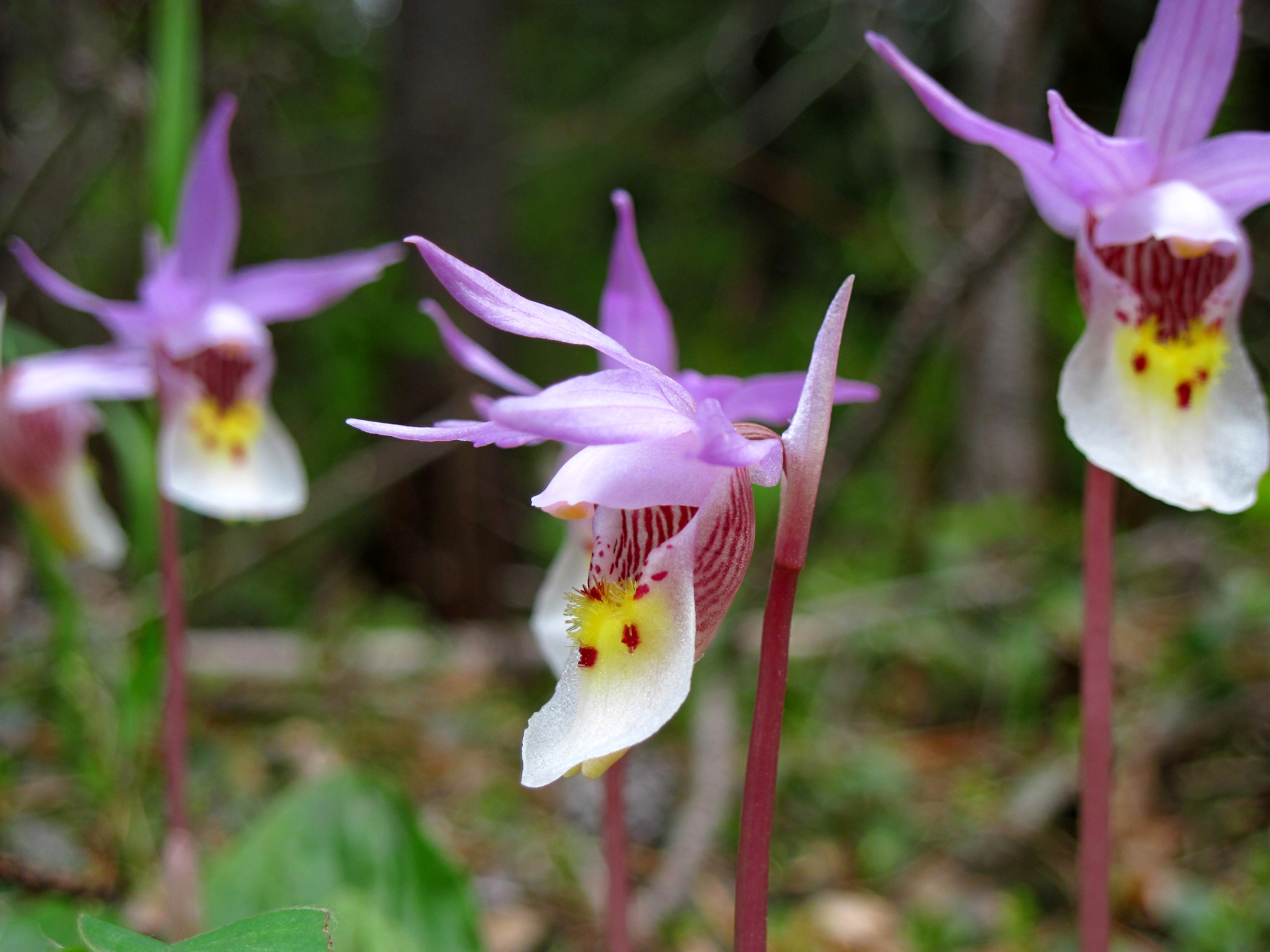
Calypso bulbosa (L.) Oakes, Calypso d’Amérique, Calypso bulbeux. Plant of mossy woods, limestone regions of Quebec (Gaspésie, Minganie, Anticosti), rare elsewhere

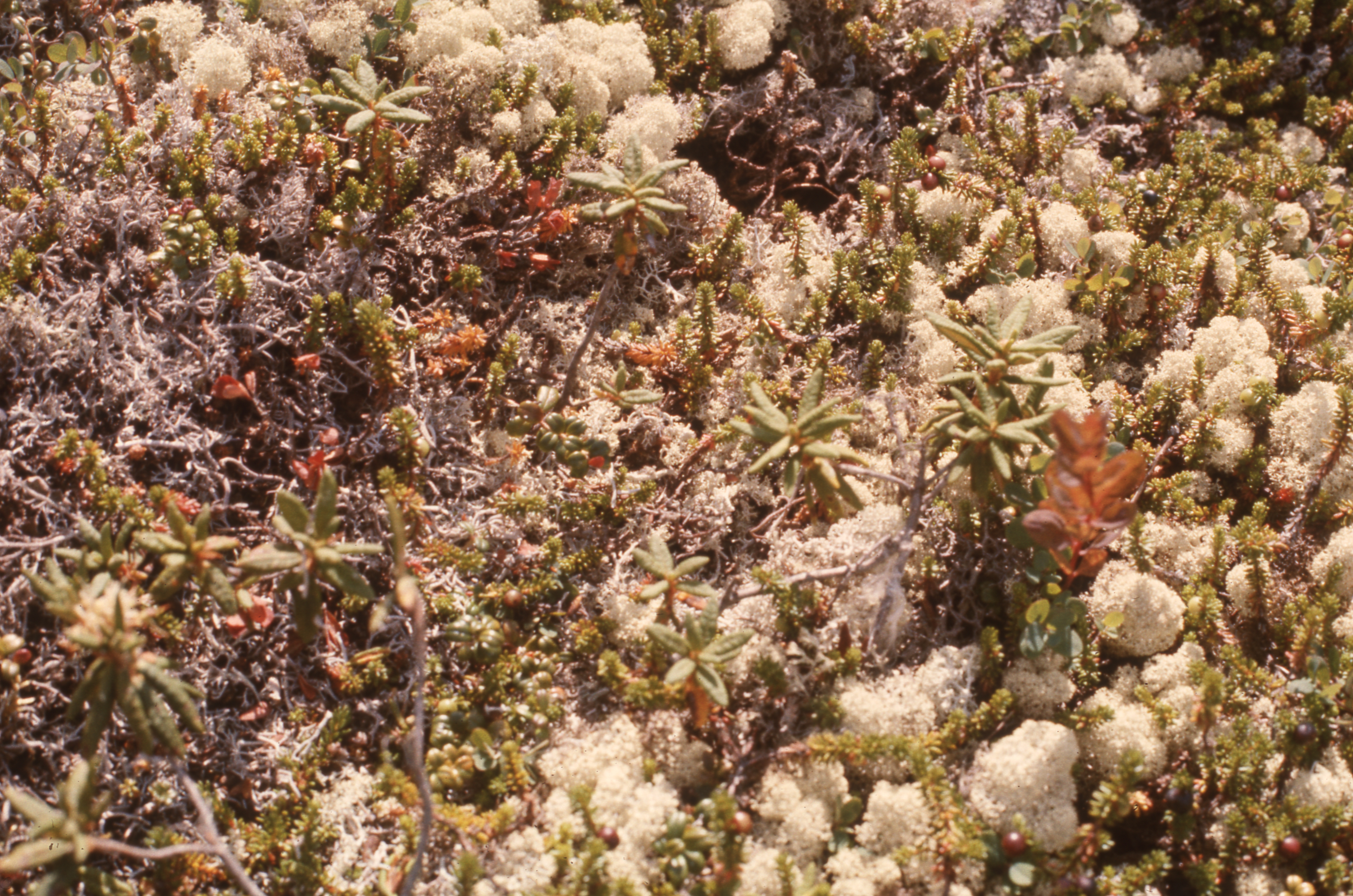
Nordic flora at our feet on Niapiskau island

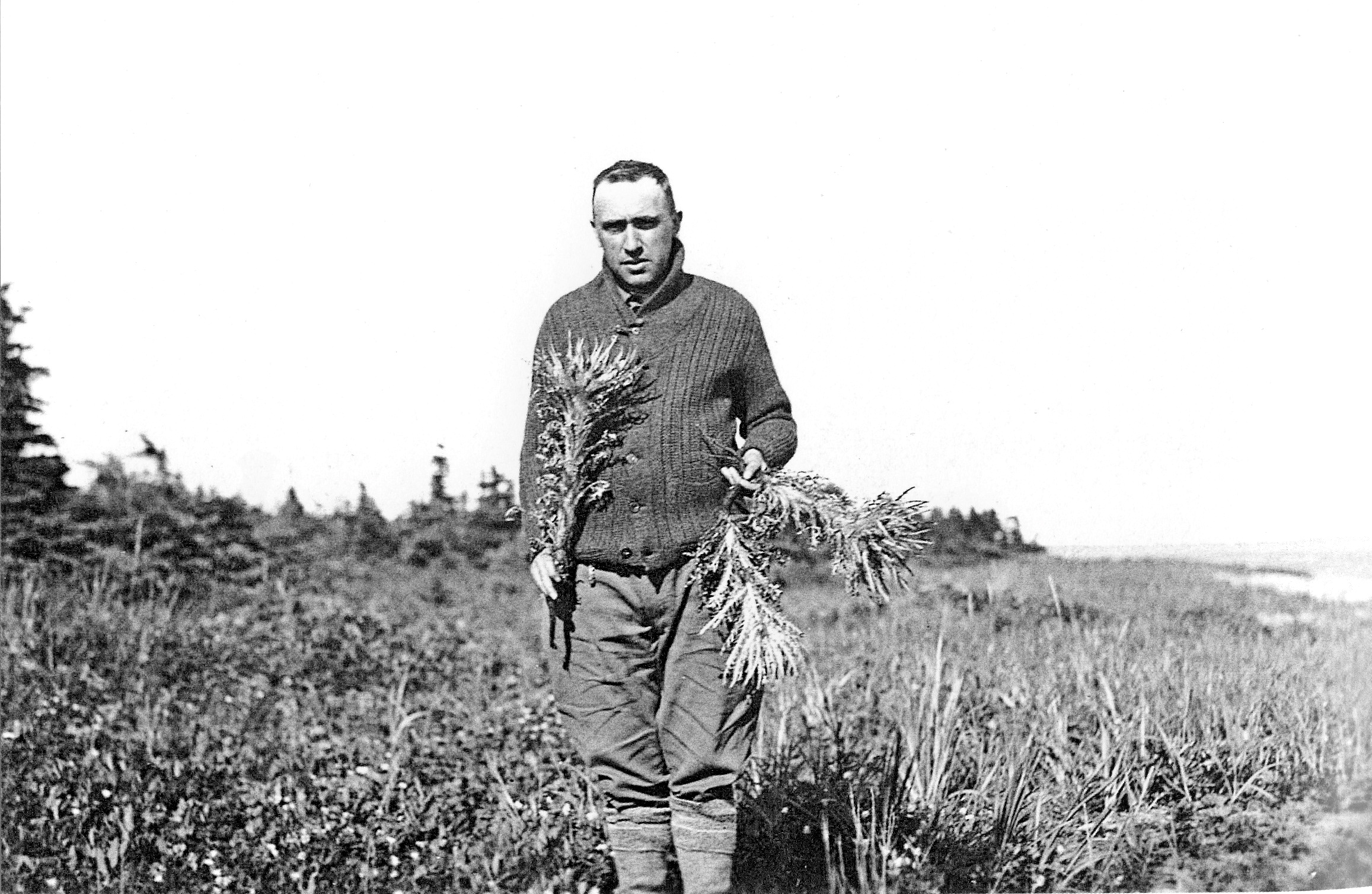
Frère Marie-Victorin (1885-1944), Mingan archipelago 1928, in hand, the C. minganense (large pale plant, with flower heads gathered in a mass surpassed by the leaves

== Fauna ==
The sea and the land are two worlds intimately related. Strictly speaking, the park's territory consists only of the Mingan islands and not the sea. But how to dissociate the islands from the surrounding blue immensity?

Nearly 200 species of bird can be observed in the field

- Warblers, Terns, Ospreys, Passerines, Razorbills, many waders
- Haliaeetus leucocephalus. -Bald Eagle. -Pygargue à tête blanche
- Somateria mollissima. -Common Eider. -Eider à duvet
- Fratercula arctica. Macareux moine. -Atlantic Puffin
- Bucephala islandica. -Barrow's Goldeneye. -Garrot d'Islande

The large number of habitats here has provided refuge to many different mammals

- Castor canadensis. -Castor du Canada -North American Beaver.
- Lontra canadensis. – Loutre du Canada. -North American river otter
- Ondatra zibethicus L. – Rat musqué. -Muskrat
- Vulpes vulpes L. -Renard roux. -Red fox
- Tamiasciurus hudsonicus. -Écureil roux - American red squirrel
- Lepus americanus. – Snowhoe hare. Lièvre d’Amérique
- Mustela erminea L. – Stoat. -Hermine
- Certain species of bats and a number of small rodents
- Occasionally, Black bears and Moose can be found on certain islands near the coast.

There are three types of seal living around the Mingan Archipelago

- Halichoerus grypus. -Phoque gris. -Grey Seal
- Phoca vitulina. Phoque commun. -Harbour Seal
- Pagophilus groenlandicus. -Phoque du Groenland. -Harp Seal

The waters of and beyond the Mingan archipelago are the hunting grounds of the cetaceans attracted by the huge shoals of plankton and fish that abound in the cold waters of the Gulf of St. Lawrence.

- Lagenorhynchus acutus. -Dauphin à nez blanc. -White-beaked dolphin
- Phocoena phocoena. -Marsouin commun. -Harbor Porpoise
- Balaenoptera acutorostrata. -Petit rorqual. -Minke whale
- Megaptera novaeangliae. -Baleine à bosse. -Humpback whales
- Balaenoptera physalus. - Rorqal commun. -Fin whale

Woodland animals live side by side with those whose habitat is the coast or the cold salty water of the Gulf of St. Lawrence.

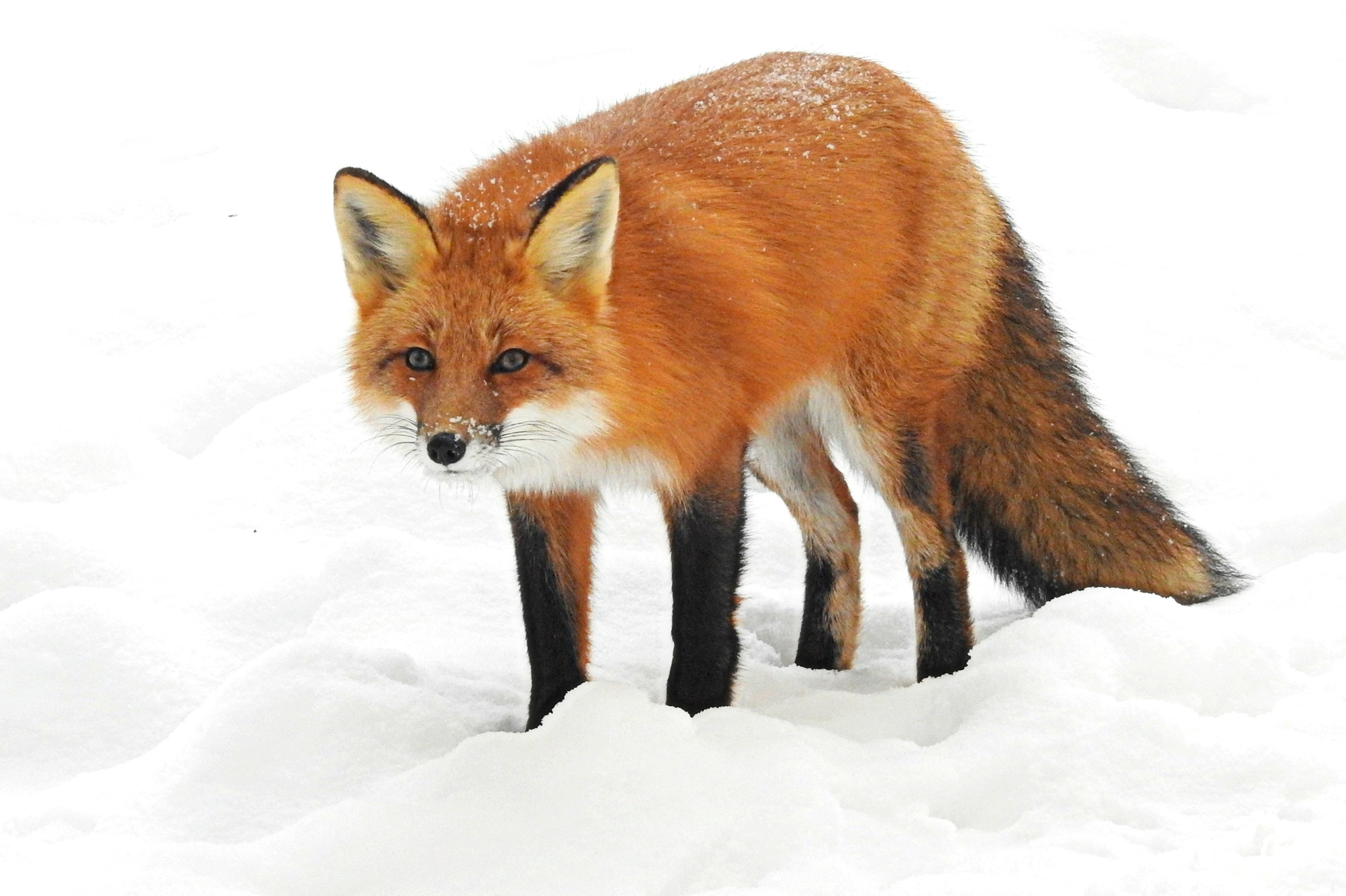
Vulpes vulpes L. -Renard roux. -Red fox

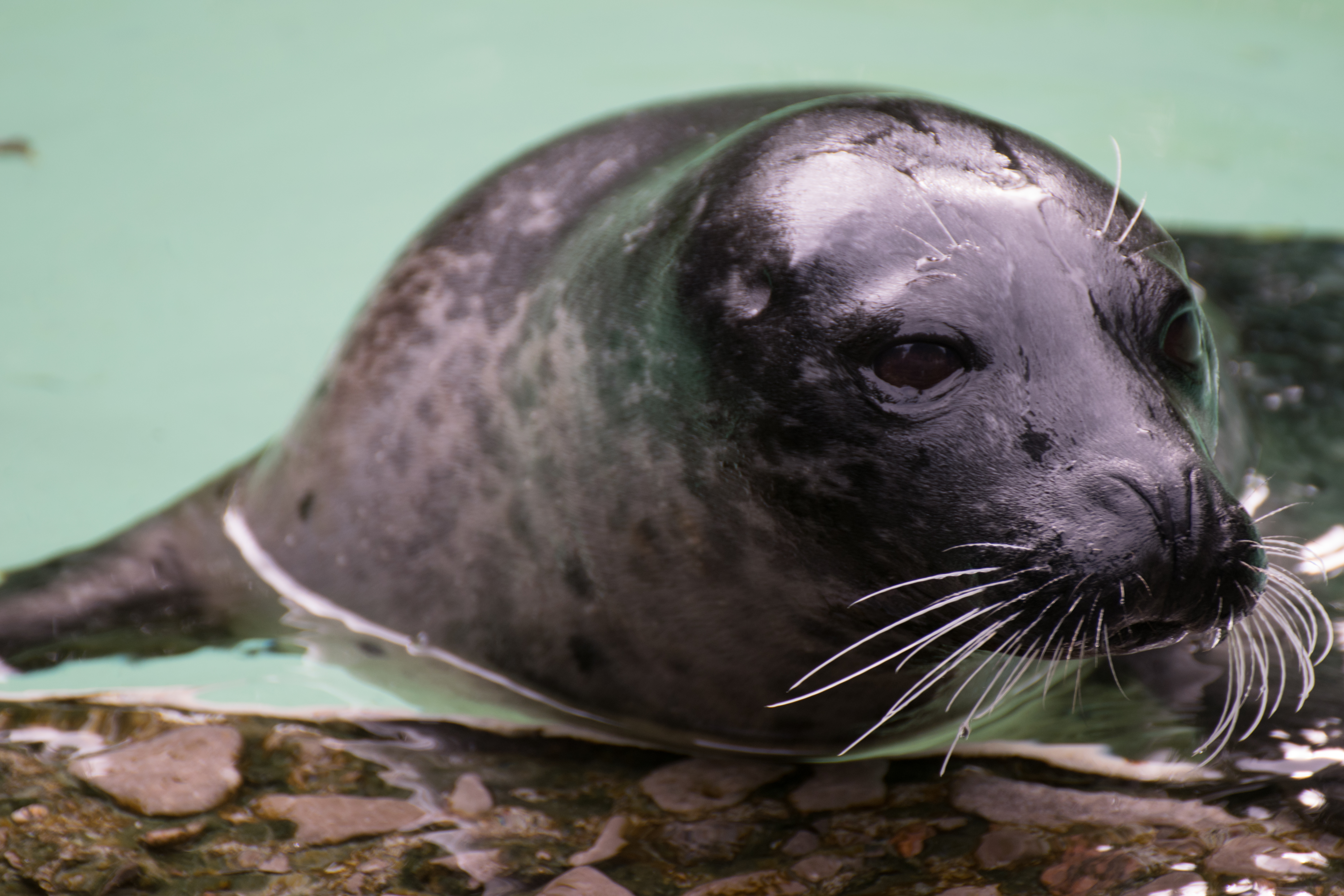
Phoca vitulina. -Phoque commun. -Harbour Seal

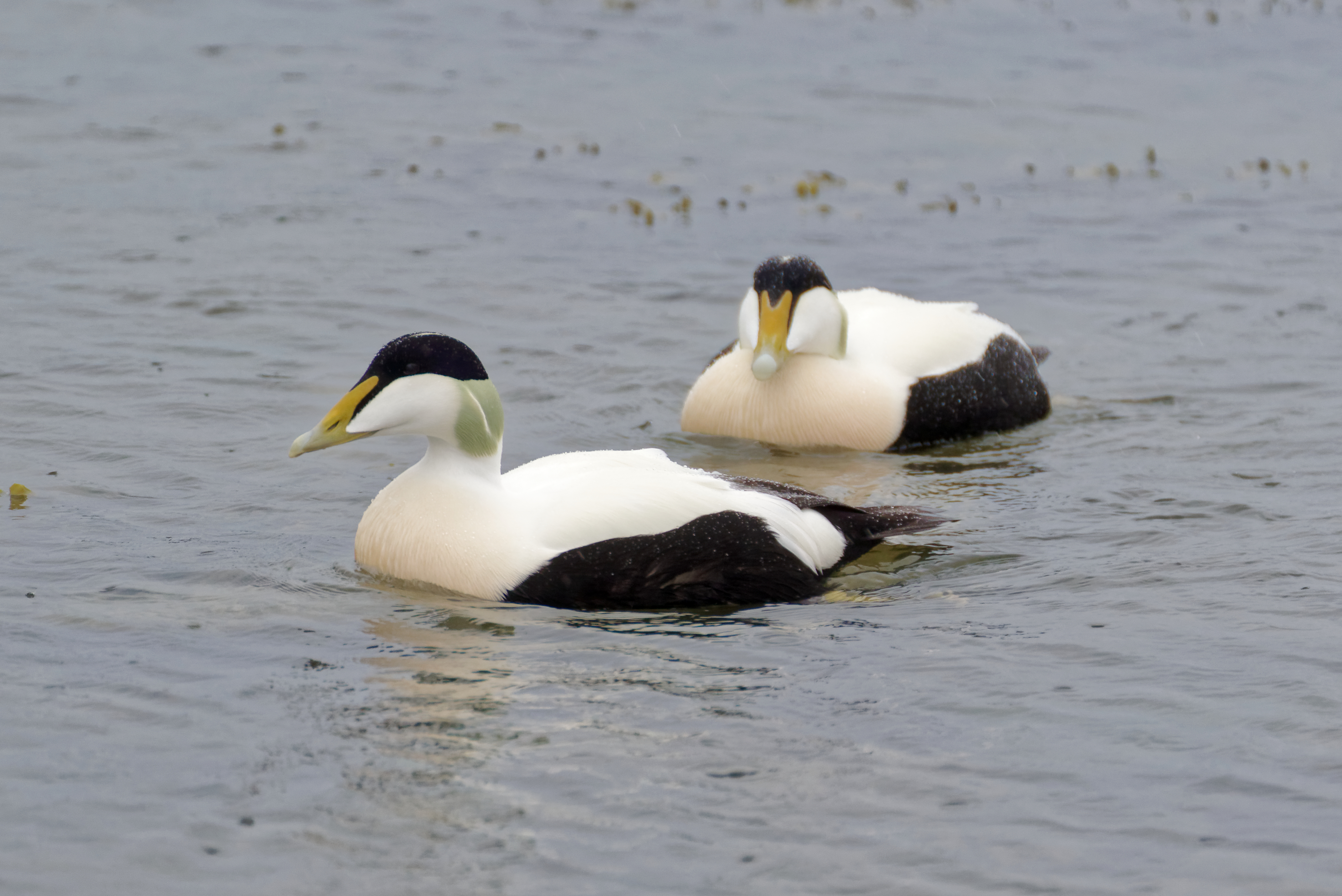
Somateria mollissima. -Common Eider. -Eider à duvet

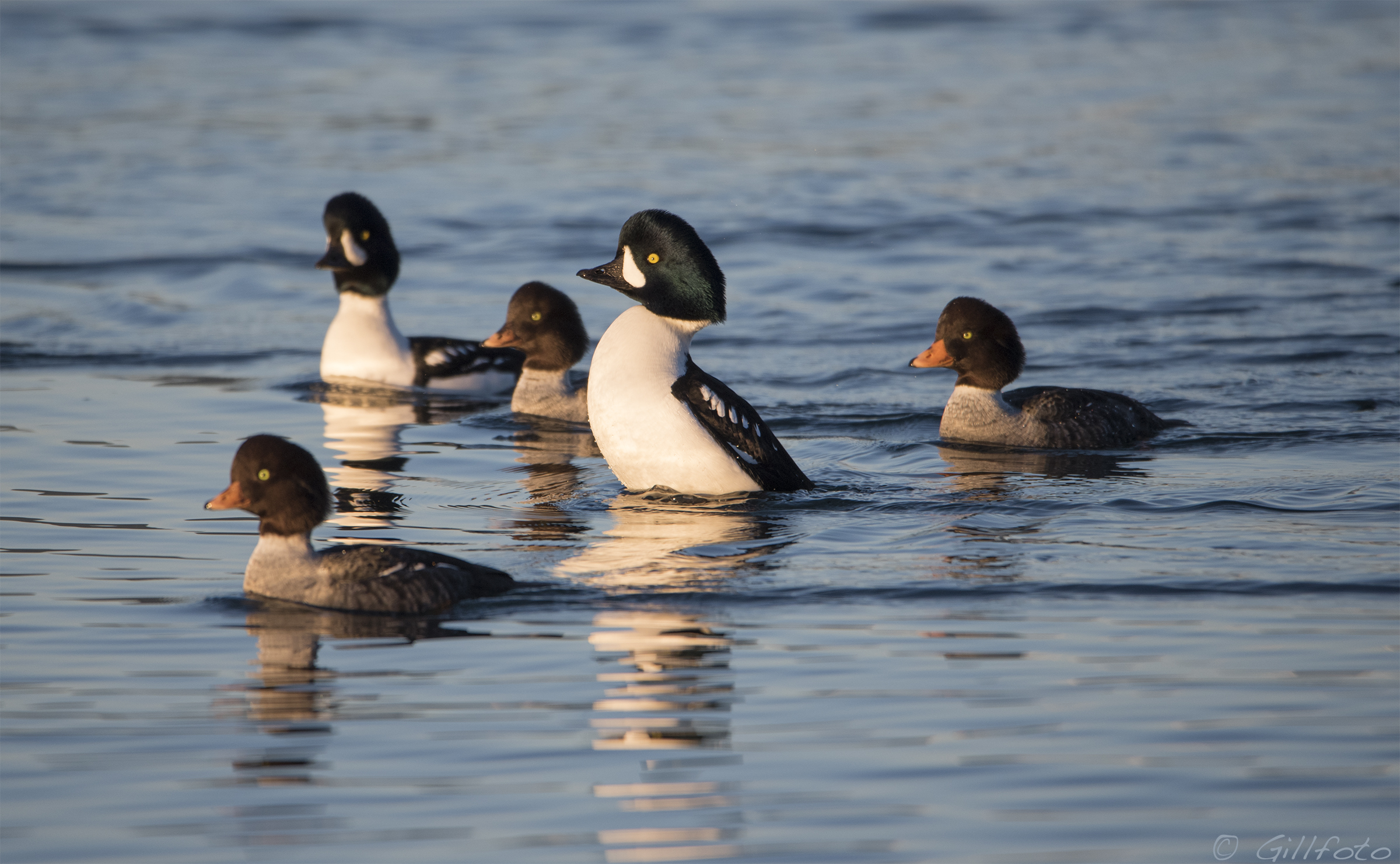
Bucephala islandica. -Barrow's Goldeneye. -Garrot d'Islande

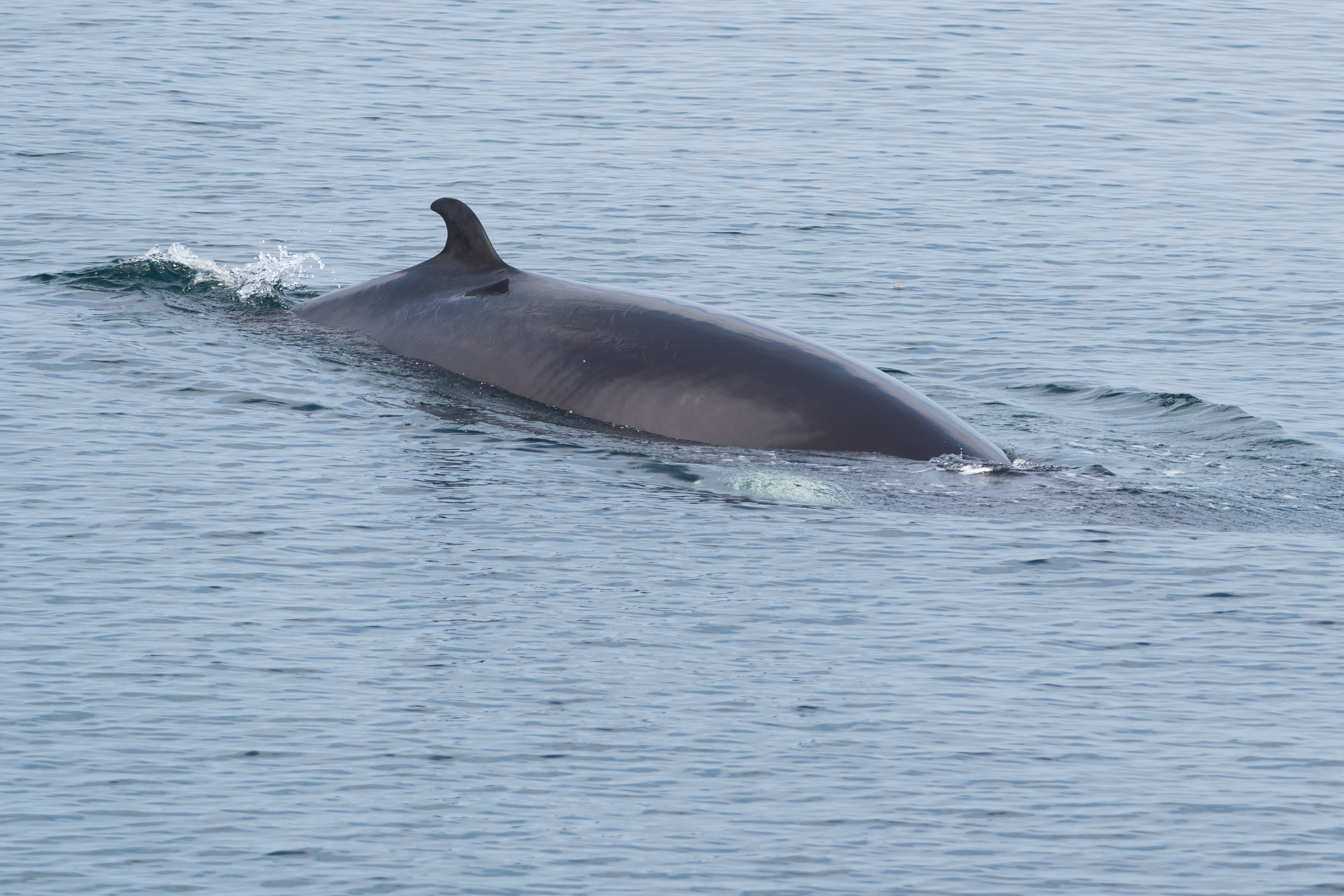
Balaenoptera acutorostrata. -Petit rorqual. -Minke whale

== History ==
=== St Lawrence River ===
The river that the Native Americans called "the way that walks" was rightly feared by those who encountered it . On the route of conquerors, explorers, fishermen, hunters, adventurers, and other navigators, it is by entering the waters of the river that the most difficult operation of the journey begins. Shallow channels, estuary reefs, shoals, diagonal currents, fog and narrow winding channels, winter and ice are among the challenges that one had to overcome to cross this river.

In North America, during the French regime (1534-1763), several shipwrecks marked the history of navigation on the St. Lawrence River.

=== The Mingan Archipelago ===
Human occupation of the Mingan Archipelago dates back at least 2000 years. The First Nations were attracted to the marine resources of this part of the gulf and engaged in molluscs harvesting, salmon fishing and seal hunting, among other activities.

Since the 16th century, the Spaniards, Portuguese and Basques have exploited the marine wealth of the coasts, the gulf and the estuary, the Basques have fished for cod and hunted whales in the Mingan archipelago.

Excavations carried out in 1986 by the Parks Canada, Quebec Region, on Mingan Island Nue and Mingan Harbour Island revealed the remains of a stone oven used by the Basques to melt the blubber of marine mammals. Historical documentation and artifacts suggest that this kiln was built and used in the seventeenth and eighteenth centuries.

=== Route 138, from Moisie River to Havre-Saint-Pierre ===
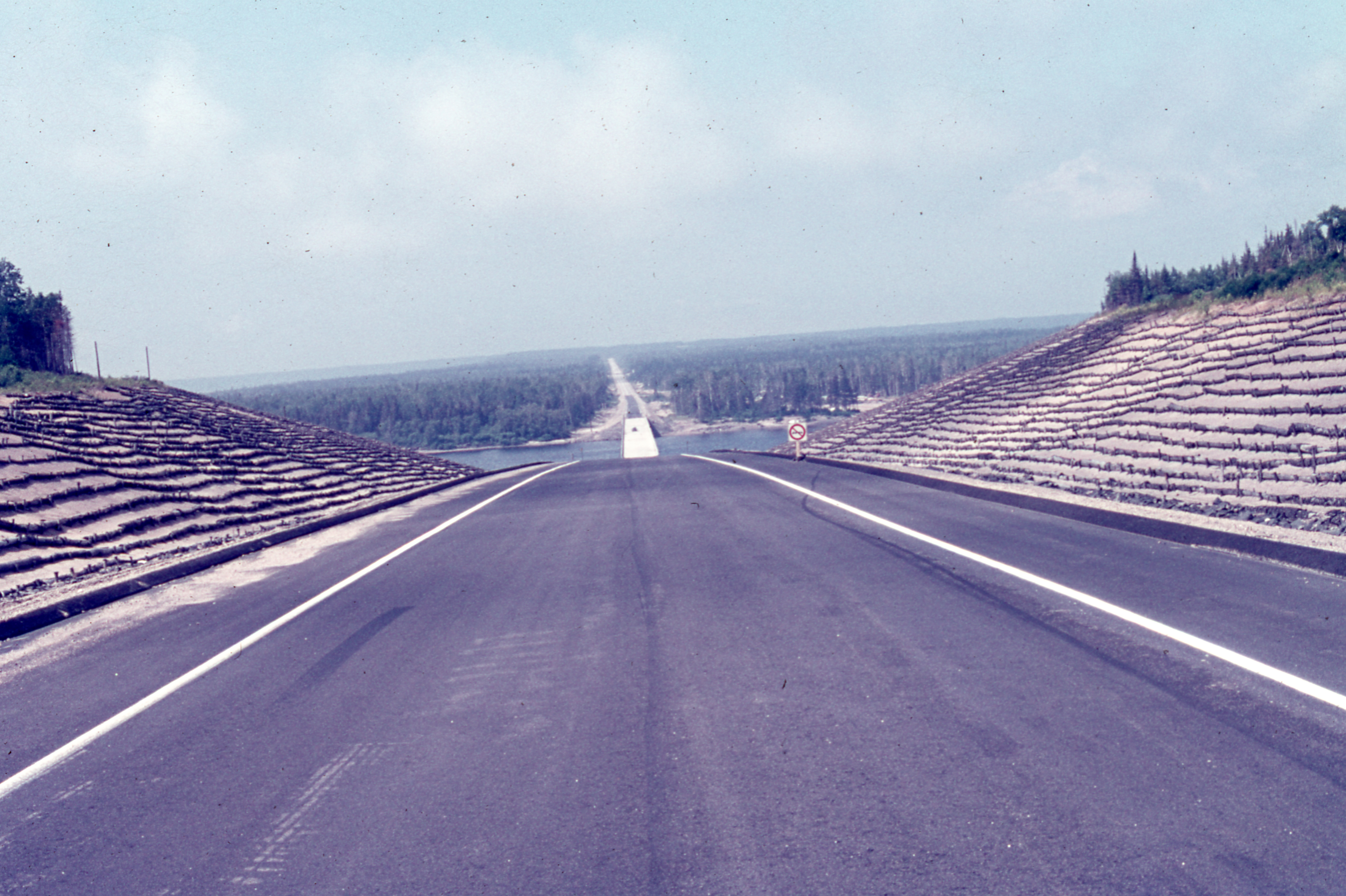
Route 138 East, Donald Gallienne Bridge over the Moisie River, from Sept-Îles (City), hamlet of Matamec, direction Moisie 1976

At the beginning of the 20th century, the first routes of what would become Route 138 (formerly Route 15) were laid in the vicinity of Sept-Îles. In 1961, a section was added from the Franquelin region to the tip of the Moisie River, some 20 kilometres east of Sept-Îles.

On the north shore of the Gulf of St. Lawrence, until 1976, there was no continuous route to go further east than the Moisie River. Only bits of paths here and there connect a few coastal villages to each other, Natashquan connects to Aguanish by a dirt road (1959).

Route 138, from Moisie River to Havre-Saint-Pierre, opened in the spring of 1976, from there access to the islands of the Mingan Archipelago by sea.

In 1984, to commemorate the 450th anniversary of Jacques Cartier's arrival in New France, the Commission de toponymie gave this name to the part of Route 138 located east of the Saguenay River, that is, the part that extends from Tadoussac to Havre-Saint-Pierre.'

== Photos ==
Mingan Archipelago National Park Reserve 1976 - 2003

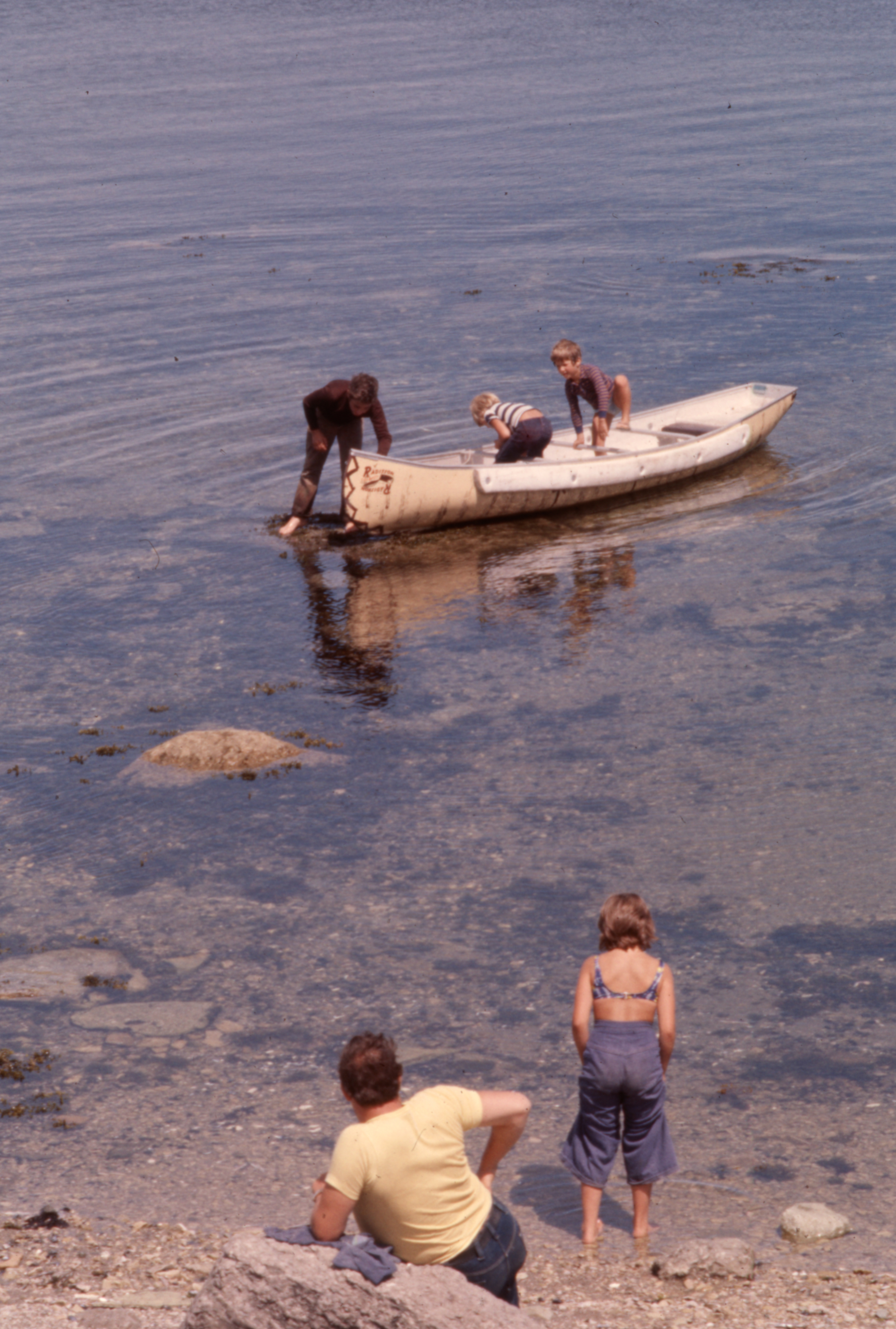
Children playing in the water, bay in an island

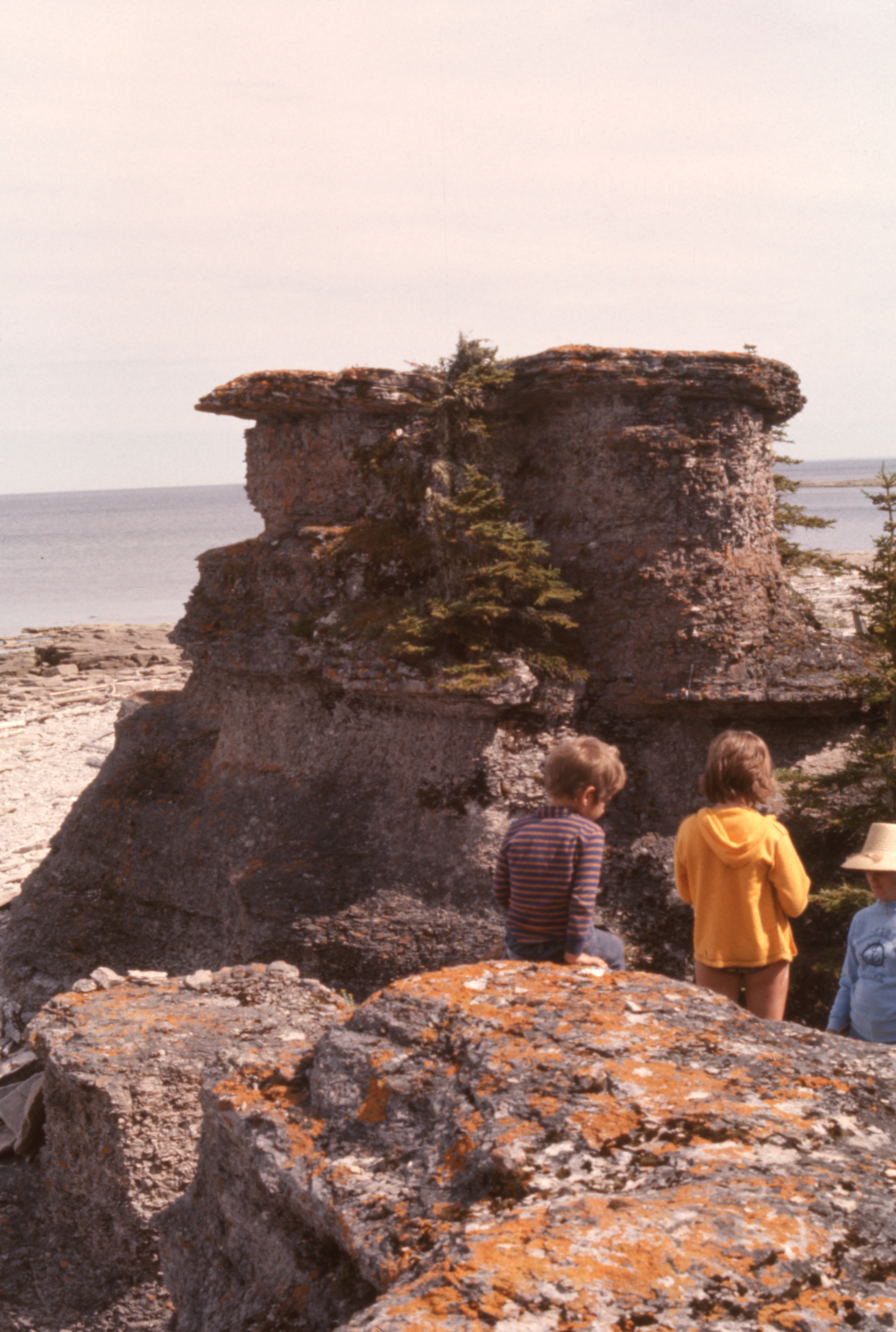
Monoliths on Niapiskau Island, visitors

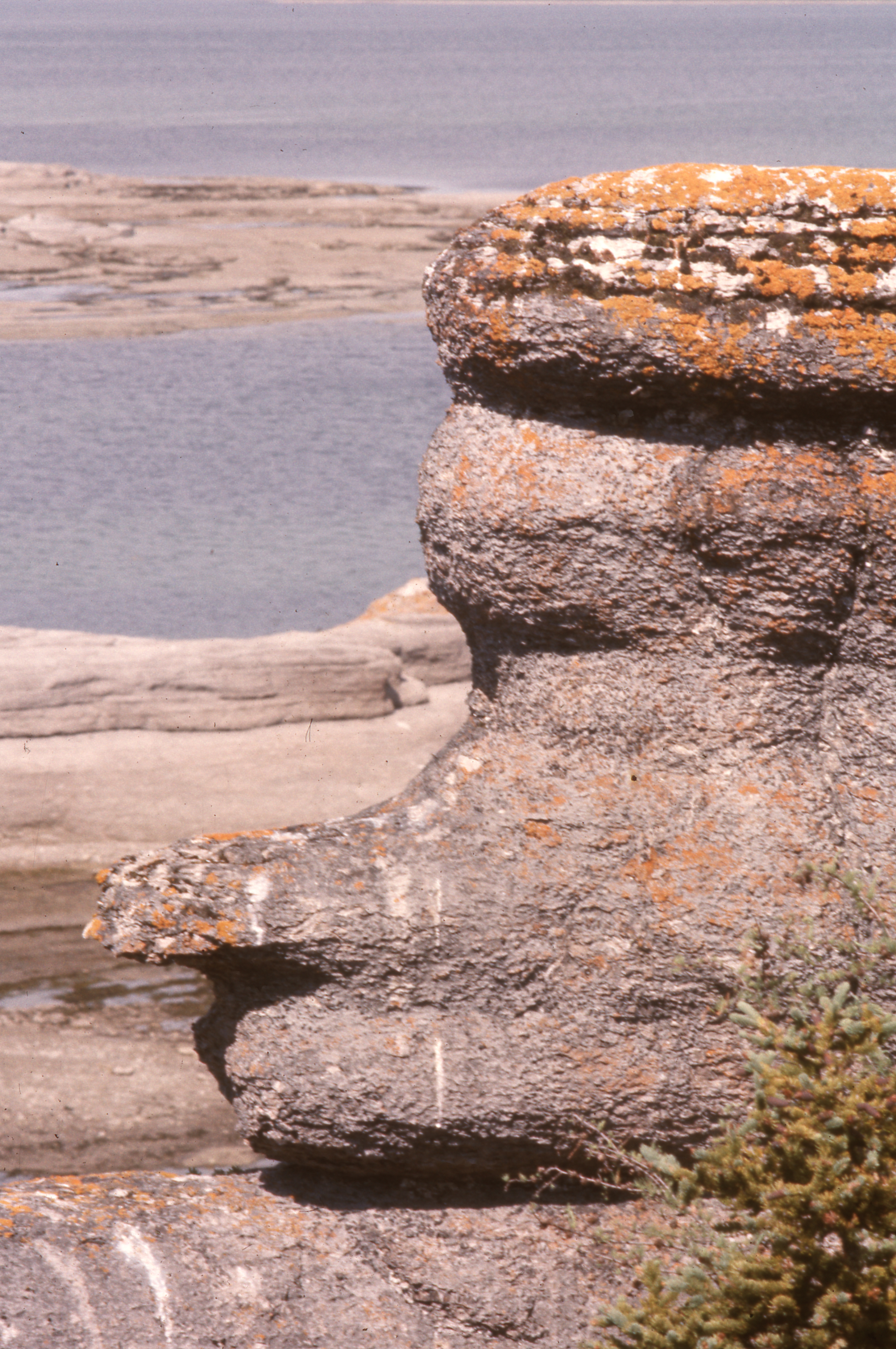
Monolith on Niapiskau Island, beach, Gulf of St. Lawrence

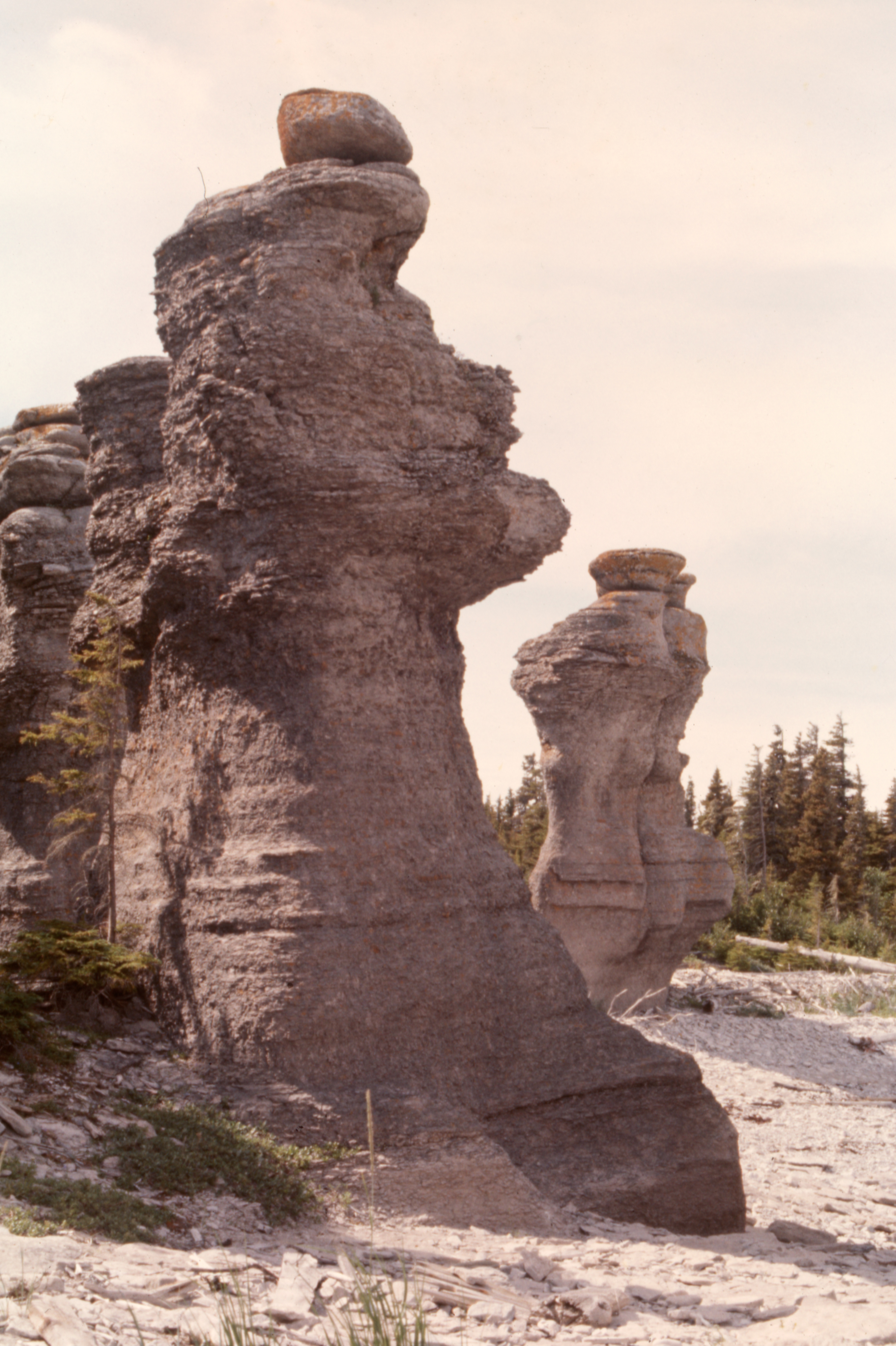
Monoliths on Niapiskau Island

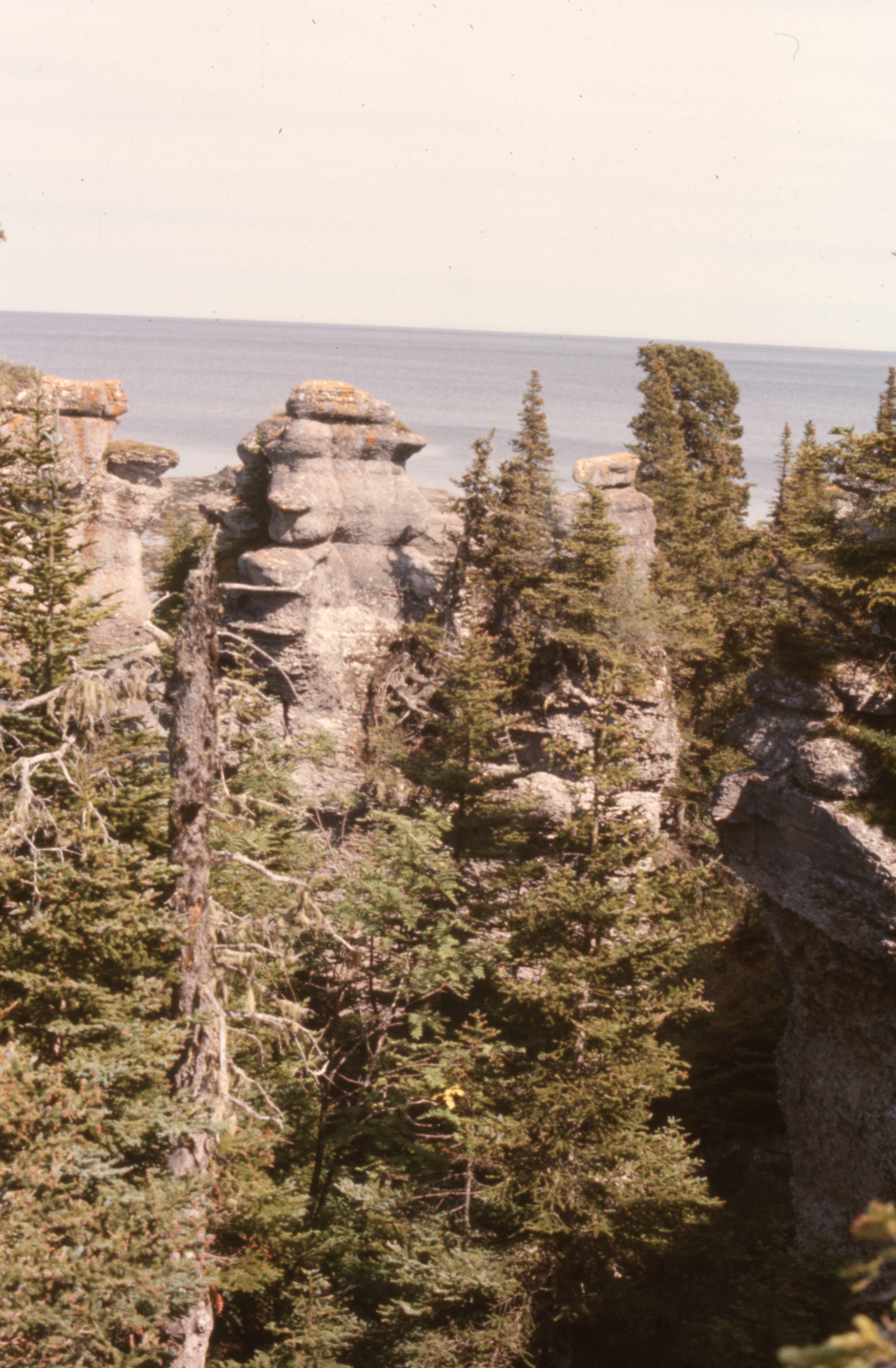
Stop at Niapiskau, limestone monoliths, boreal forest, Gulf of St. Lawrence
Mingan Archipelago National Park Reserve 1976

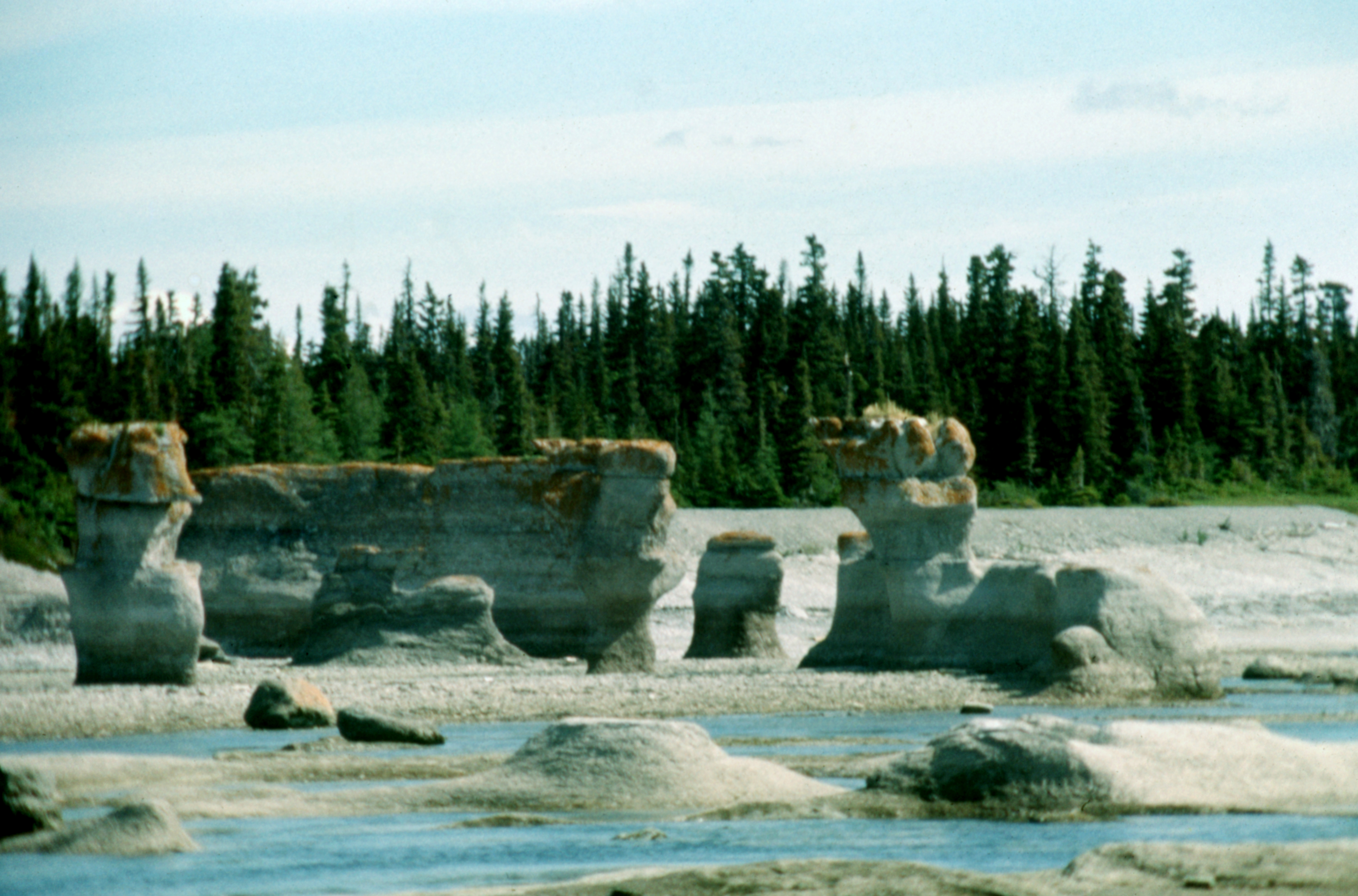
South Quarry Island, monoliths, limestone formations, boreal forest

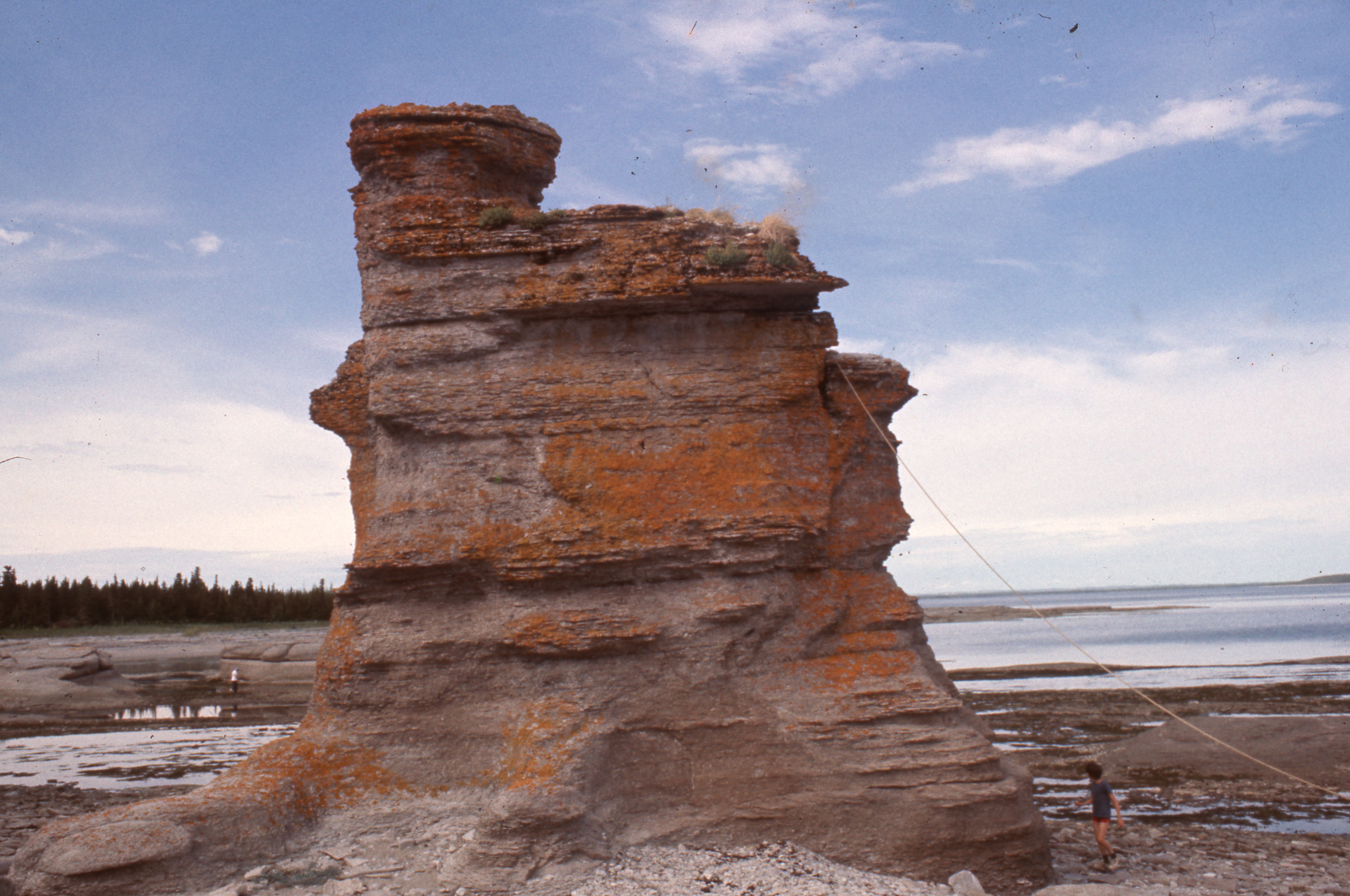
Monolith on Niapiskau, Bay

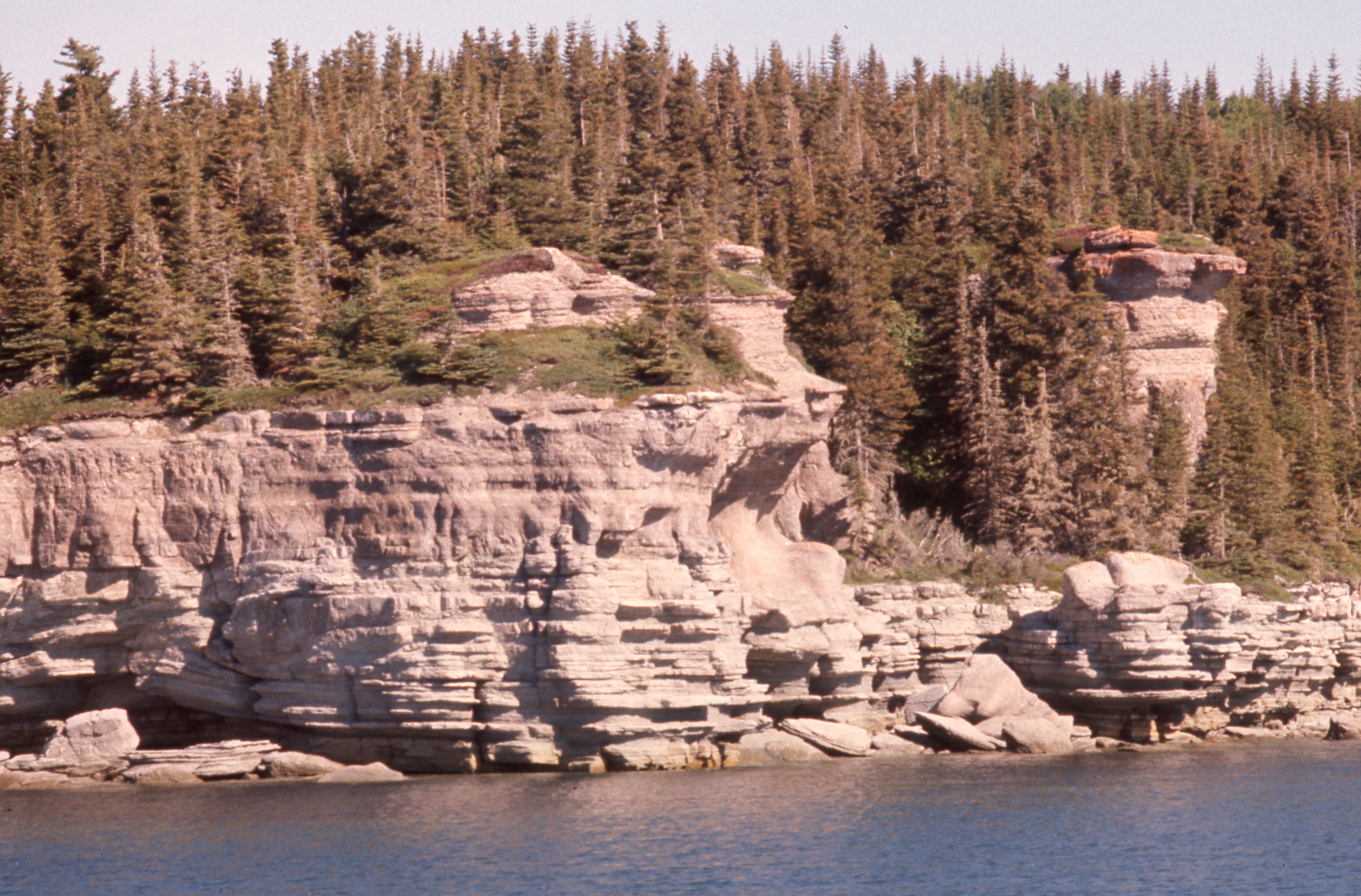
Islands, islets, rocks, cays, reefs

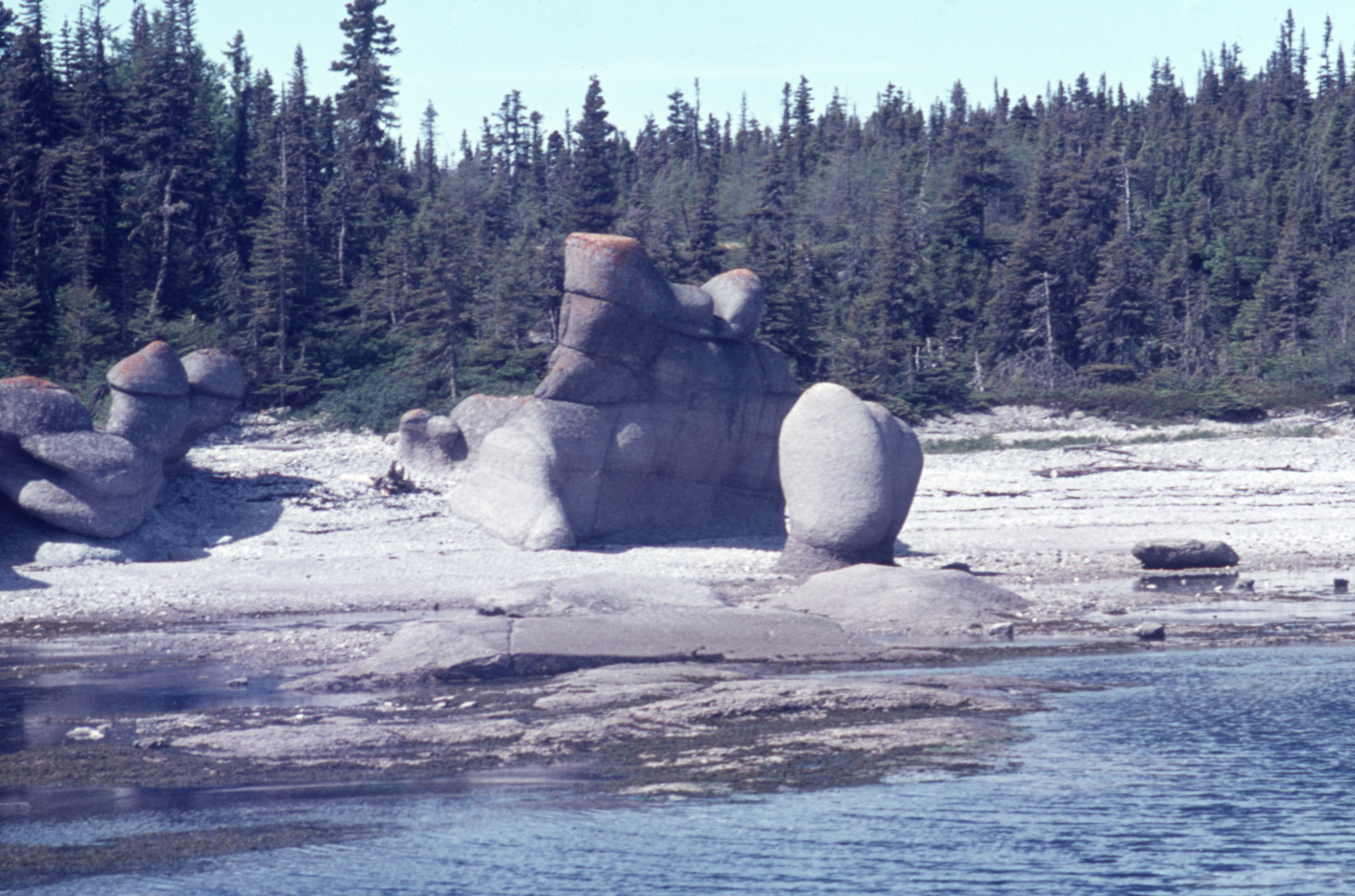
La Grande-Île, monoliths, St Lawrence Golf

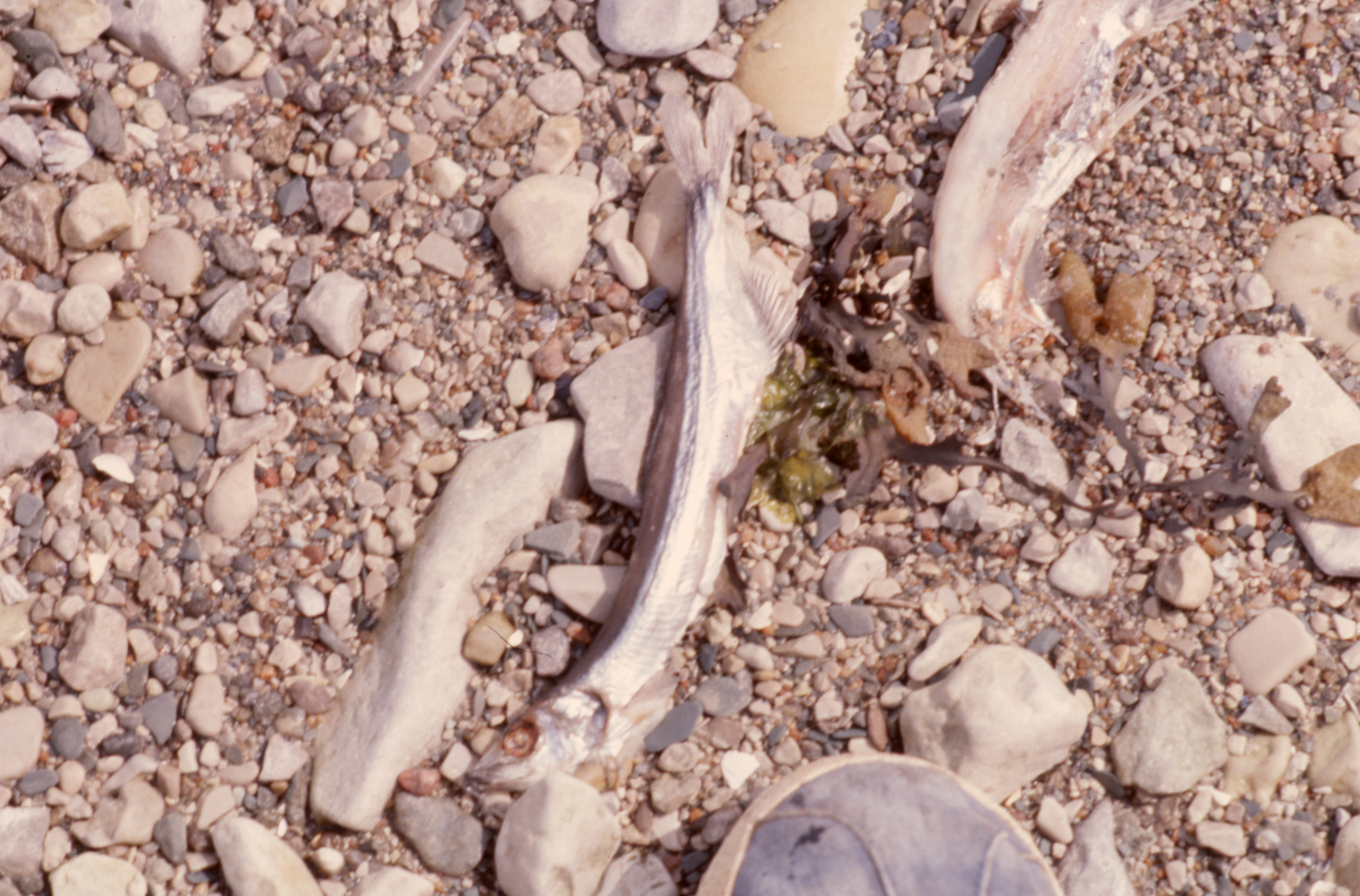
Stone Shore and Mallotus villosus, Capelin, small fish of the Atlantic and Arctic oceans
Mingan Archipelago National Park Reserve from a seaplane 1976

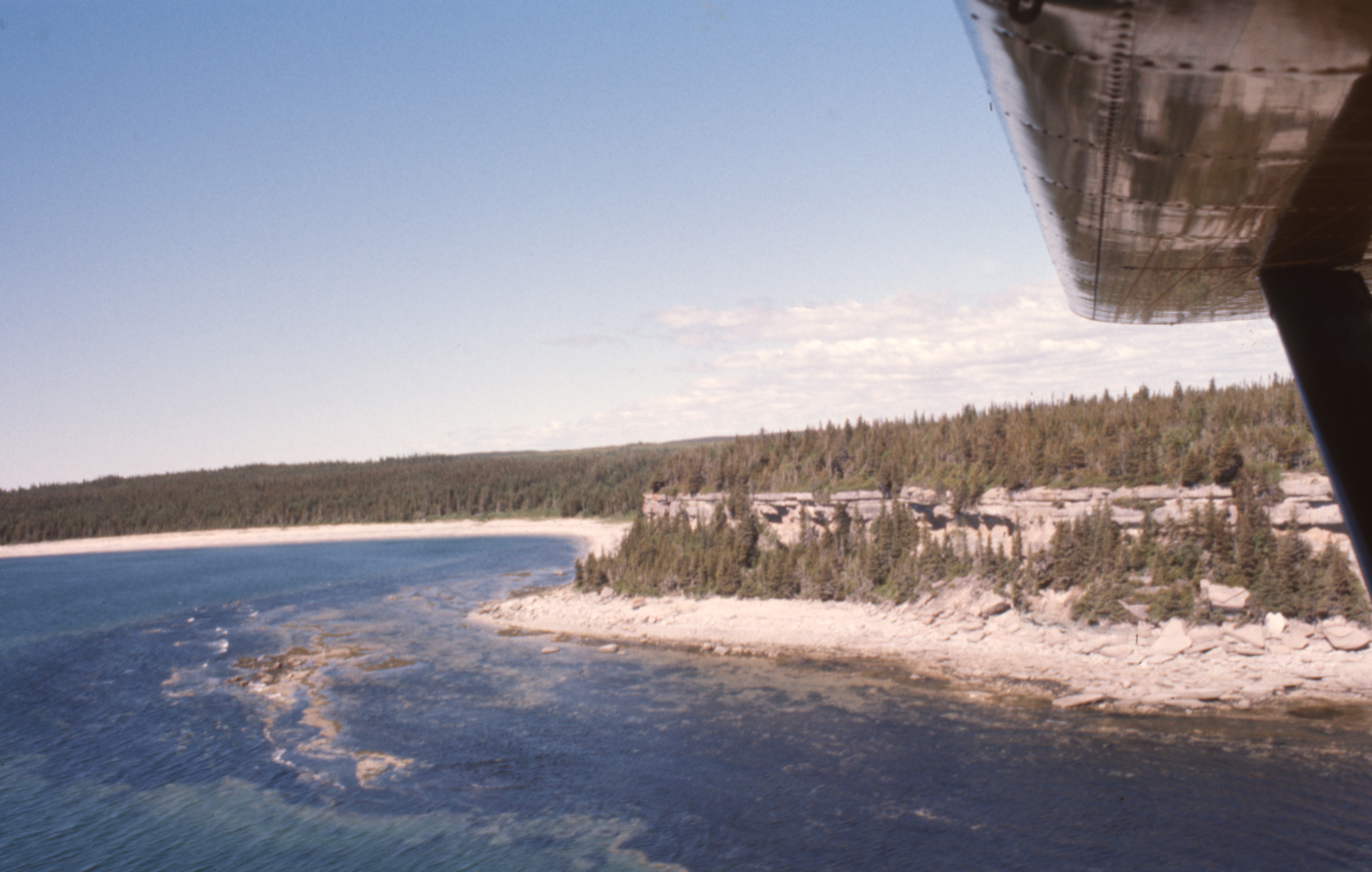
Gulf of St. Lawrence, Mingan Archipelago, islands, monoliths, vegetation of cold shores

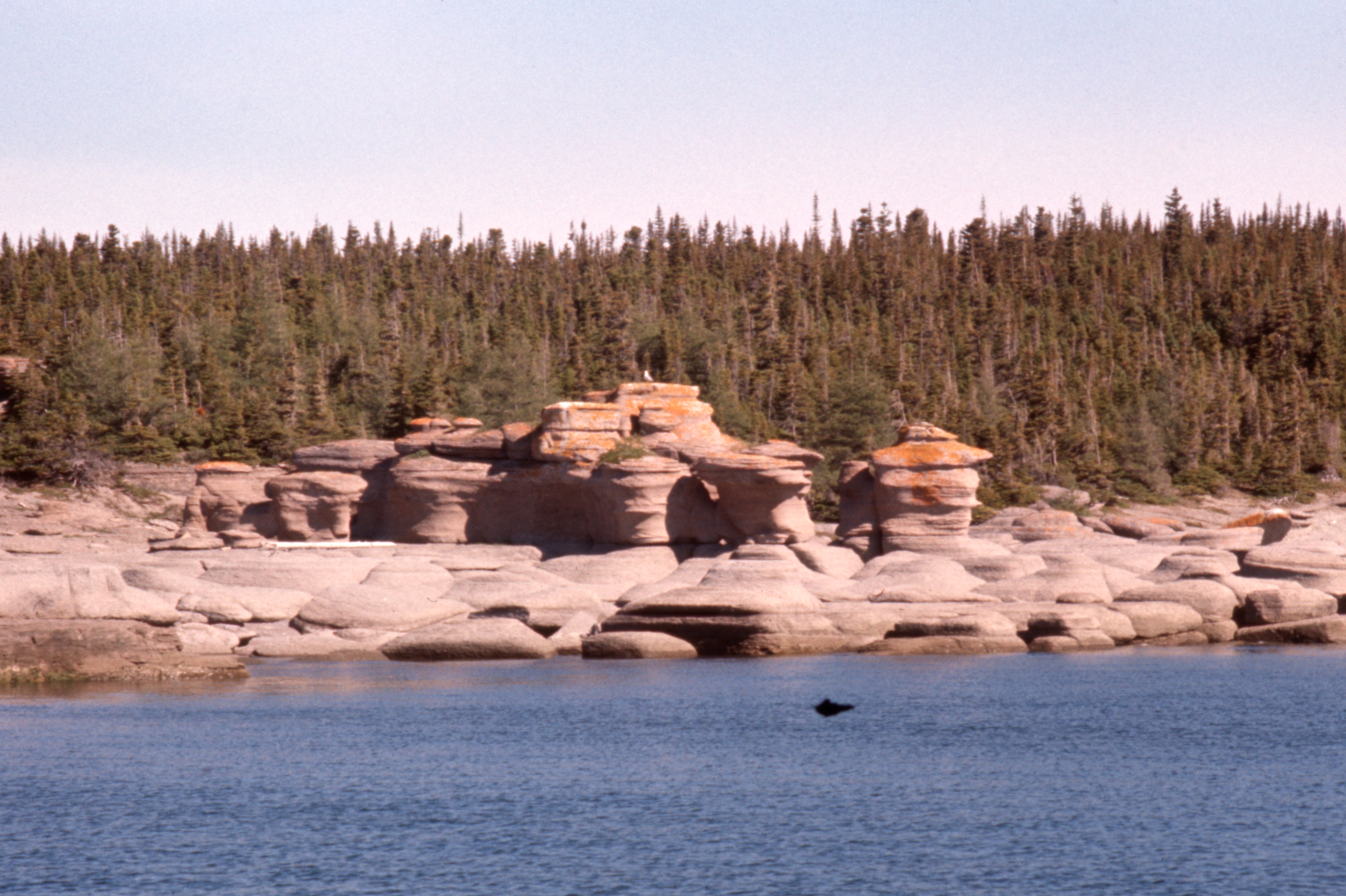
Ile du Fantôme

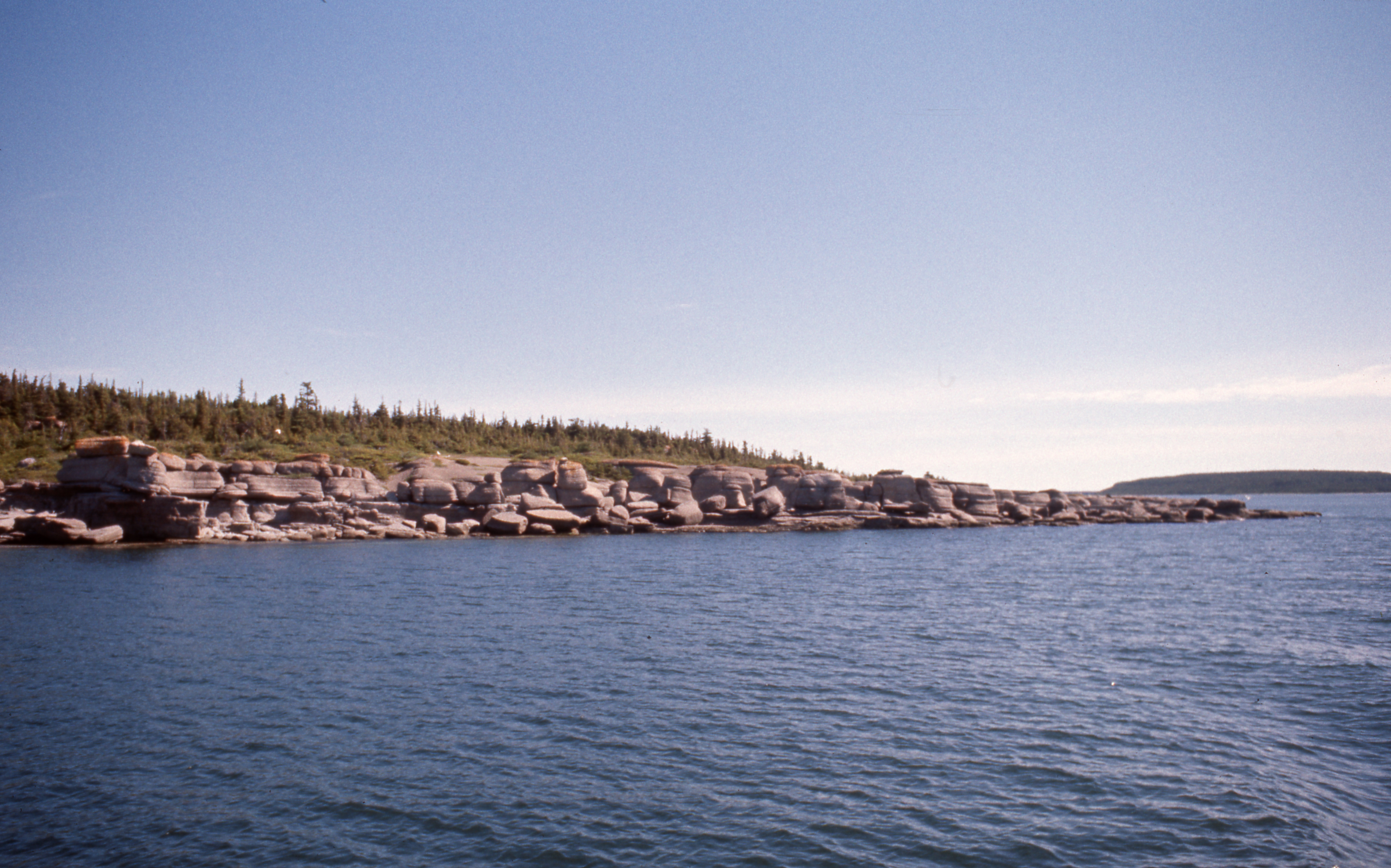
Gulf of St. Lawrence, Mingan Archipelago, islands, monoliths, cold shoreline vegetation

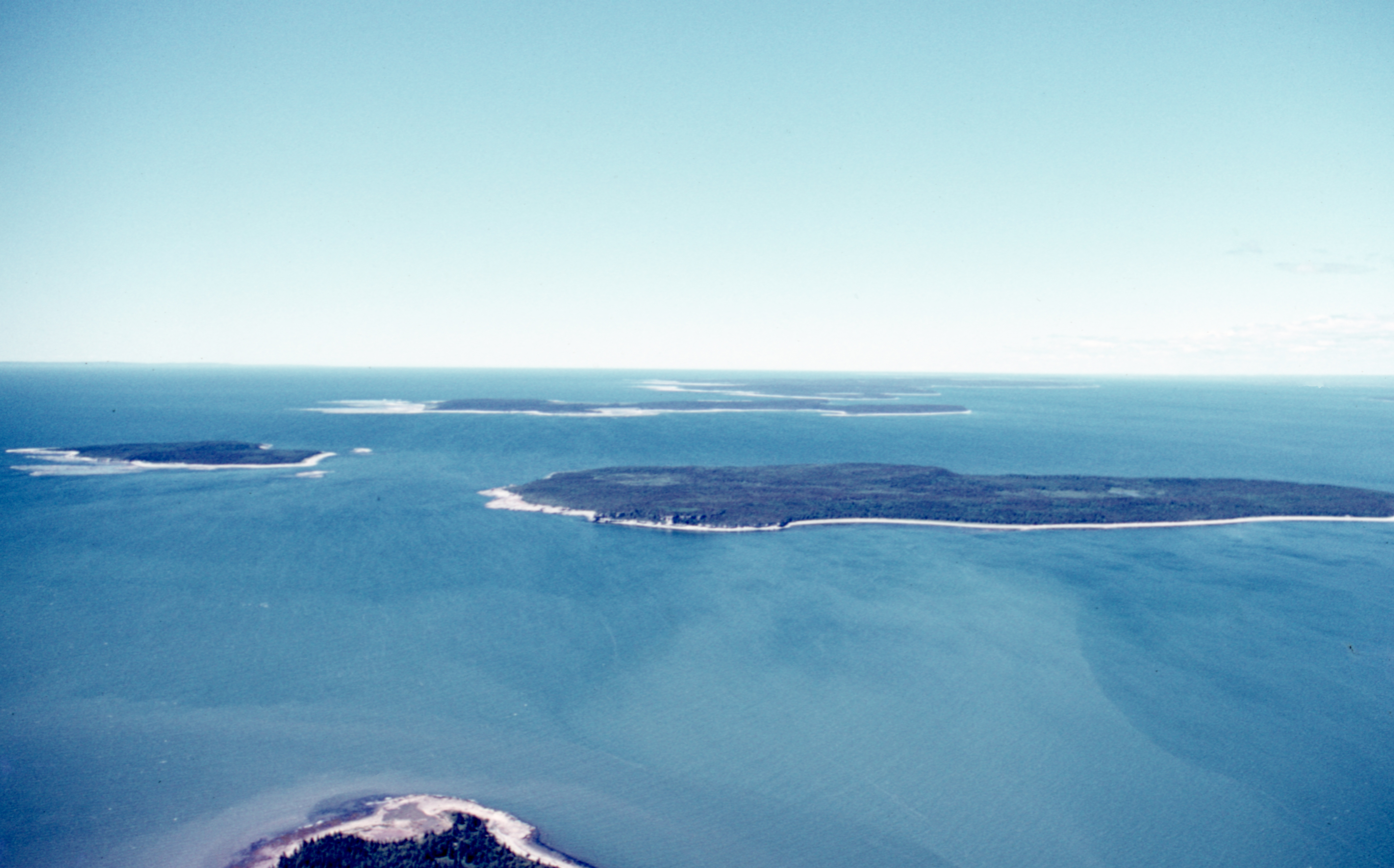
Gulf of St. Lawrence, Mingan Islands

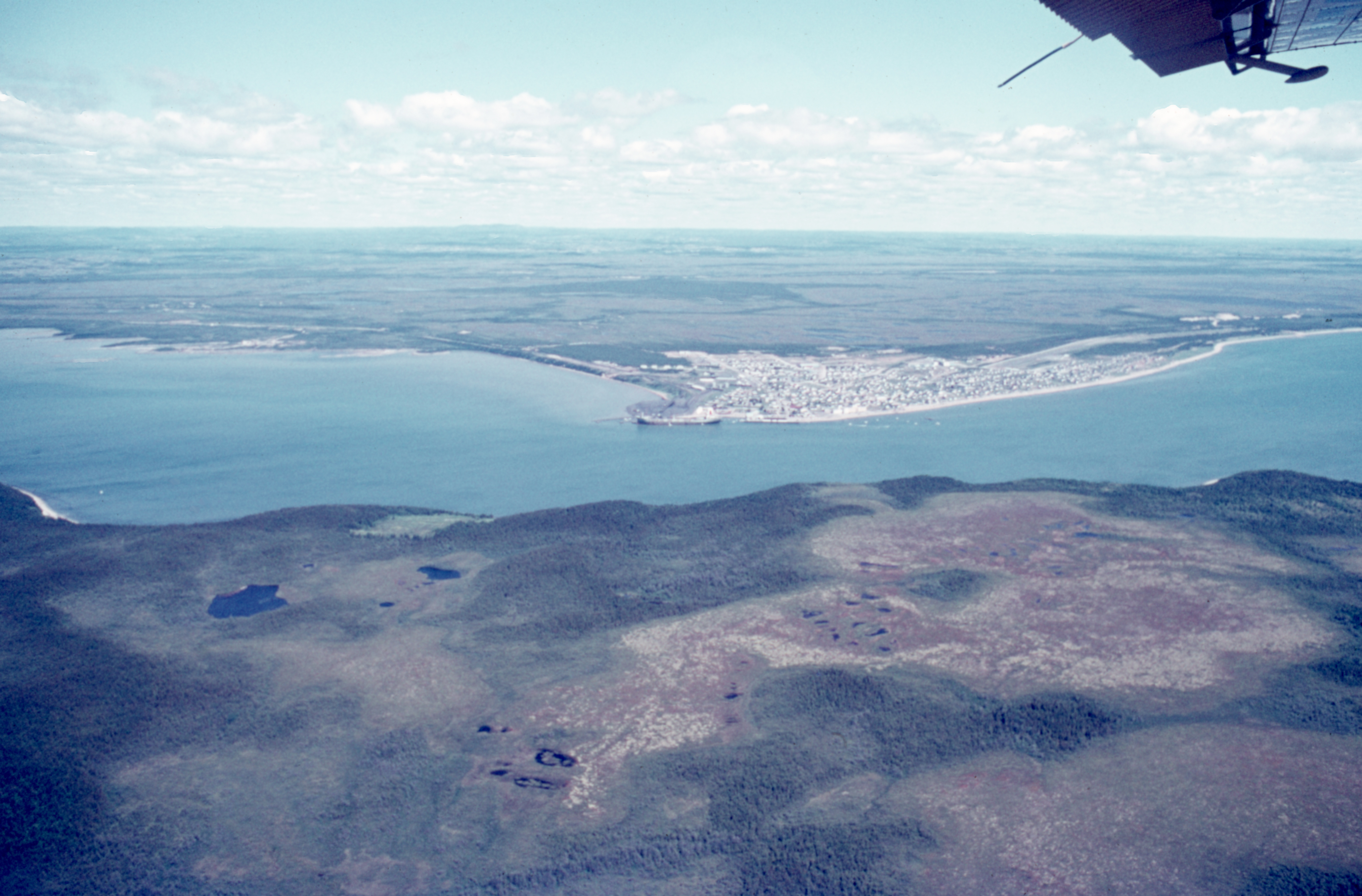
Havre-Saint-Pierre, Gulf of St. Lawrence, Mingan Archipelago Islands, mainland

== See also ==
- National Parks of Canada
- List of National Parks of Canada
