= Becscie Formation =

Geologic formation in Quebec, Canada

- Stratigraphic range: Early Silurian
- Type: Geological formation
- Sub-units: Fox Point Member (lower); Chabot Member (upper)
- Underlies: Gun River Formation
- Overlies: Ellis Bay Formation
- Thickness: 80 to 85 meters

Location
- Region: Quebec
- Country: Canada

The Becscie Formation is a geologic formation in Quebec. It preserves fossils dating back to the early Silurian period.

== Description ==
The Becscie Formation is 80 to 85 meters thick. It overlies the Ordovician-Silurian boundary on Anticosti Island, marking a major oceanic and climatic changeover from the glacial sea-level lowstand and interglacial highstand cycles of the underlying Ellis Bay Formation to the more stable warming climate of the earliest Silurian, and extends approximately parallel to an ancient coastline some 200 km east to west. The formation is divided into two members, a lower Fox Point Member (spanning the Viridita lenticularis Biozone), and an upper Chabot Member (spanning the Virgiana barrandei Biozone).

== Fossil content ==
Arthropods
Genus	Species	Presence	Material	Notes	Images
Anticostibolbina		Chabot Member.		A beyrichiacean ostracod.	
Bolbineossia		Chabot Member.		A beyrichiacean ostracod.	
Conbathella		Chabot Member.		A beyrichiacean ostracod.	
Herrmannina	H. selwyni	Lower Becscie Formation.		An ostracod	
Zygobursa		Chabot Member.		A beyrichiacean ostracod.	

Brachiopods
Genus	Species	Presence	Material	Notes	Images
Becscia	B. scissura		"Occurs commonly in lenses and clusters".	An atrypid.	
Biparetis				Elsewhere known from the early Silurian, but locally rare.	
Brachyprion		Occurs sparsely in the Chabot Member.			
Eospirigerina	E. sp.	Fox Point Member.		An unnamed species, represents earliest known Silurian species of this Ordovician genus.	
Hesperorthis		Fox Point Member.		An orthide.	
Isorthis (Ovalella)		Fox Point Member.		An orthide.	
Koigia				An athyridid, originally reported as Hindella.	
Leptaena		Fox Point Member bedding plane.			
Mendacella	M. udauberis	Fox Point Member, rare in the Chabot Member.		An orthide.	
Saukrodictya		Fox Point Member.		An orthide.	
Virgiana	V. barrandei	Only in the Chabot Member.		A large-shelled pentameride.	
Viridita	V. becsciensis	Fox Point Member.	"Holotype, YPM 10341, and paratype, YPM 35519".		
Viridita	V. lenticularis	Near the top of the Fox Point Member, and the Chabot Member.			
Zygospiraella	Z. cf. Z. planoconvexa	Lower Becscie Formation, rare taxon in the lower Chabot Member.			

Bryozoans
Genus	Species	Presence	Material	Notes	Images
Phaenopora	P. superba	Fox Point and Chabot Members.		"Extends into the overlying Gun River Formation"	

Corals
Genus	Species	Presence	Material	Notes	Images
Acidolites	A. arctatus			A heliolitid.	
Acidolites	A. compactus			A heliolitid.	
Acidolites	A. lindströmi			A heliolitid.	
Nanonphyllum	N. pelagicum	Common in the Chabot Member.		A colonial rugose coral.	
Paleofavosites		More common towards the upper part of the Fox Point Member.		A heliolitid tabulate coral.	
Palaeophyllum		Common in the Chabot Member.			
Propora		More common towards the upper part of the Fox Point Member.		A heliolitid tabulate coral.	

Crinoids
Genus	Species	Presence	Material	Notes	Images
Alopocrinus		Fox Point and Chabot members.			
Becsciecrinus		Fox Point and Chabot members.			
Dendrocrinus		Chabot Member.			
Eumyelodactylus		Fox Point Member.			
Euspirocrinus		Fox Point Member.			
Protaxocrinus		Fox Point Member.			
Xenocrinus		Chabot Member.			

Gastropods
Genus	Species	Presence	Material	Notes	Images
Hormotoma		Eastern side of Anticosti Island.		A hormotomid.	
Subulites		Eastern side of Anticosti Island.		A soleniscid.	

Graptolites
Genus	Species	Presence	Material	Notes	Images
Climacograptus	C. typicalis var. atlanticus				

Sponges
Genus	Species	Presence	Material	Notes	Images
Clathrodictyon	C. boreale	Fox Point and Chabot members.	"A single small, spheroidal specimen".	A stromatoporoid.	
Ecclimadictyon	E. macrotuberculatum	Chabot Member.		A stromatoporoid.	
Pachystylostroma		Very top of the Chabot Member.		A stromatoporoid.	

== See also ==
- List of fossiliferous stratigraphic units in Quebec
