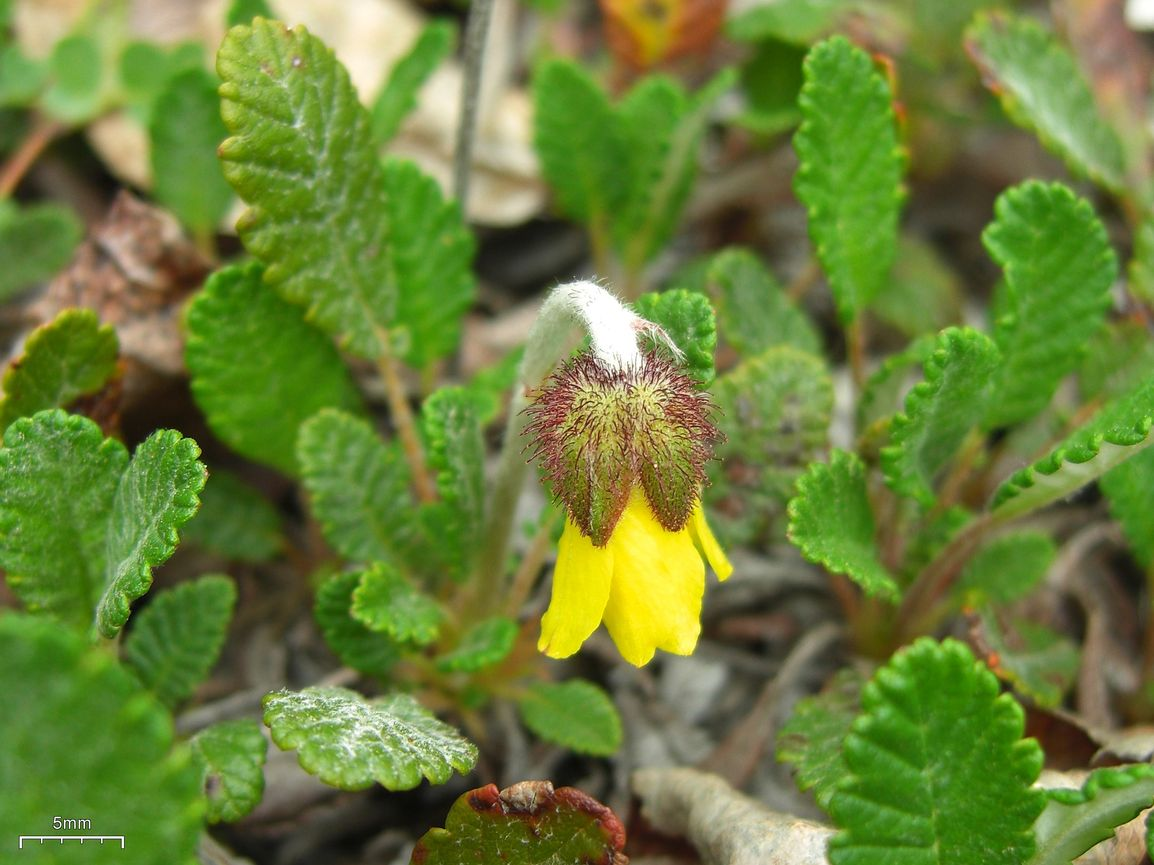
- Dryas drummondii

Conservation status
- Secure (NatureServe)

Scientific classification
- Kingdom: Plantae
- Clade: Tracheophytes
- Clade: Angiosperms
- Clade: Eudicots
- Clade: Rosids
- Order: Rosales
- Family: Rosaceae
- Genus: Dryas
- Species: D. drummondii

Binomial name
- Dryas drummondii Richardson ex Hook.
- The distribution of Dryas drummondii.

Synonyms
- Dryadaea drummondii (Richardson ex Hook.) Kuntze; Dryas chamaedrifolia Richardson; Dryas drummondii var. eglandulosa A.E.Porsild; Dryas drummondii f. tomentosa (Farr) Hultén; Dryas drummondii var. tomentosa (Farr) L.O.Williams; Dryas octopetala var. drummondii (Richardson ex Hook.) S.Watson; Dryas tomentosa Farr

= Dryas drummondii =

Species of flowering plant

Dryas drummondii is a species of flowering plant in the rose family known by the common names yellow mountain-avens, yellow dryas, or yellow dryad. It is native to Alaska, Canada, and the Northern United States.

This species is actinorhizal, able to live in symbiosis with nitrogen-fixing bacteria.

Dryas drummondii Richard

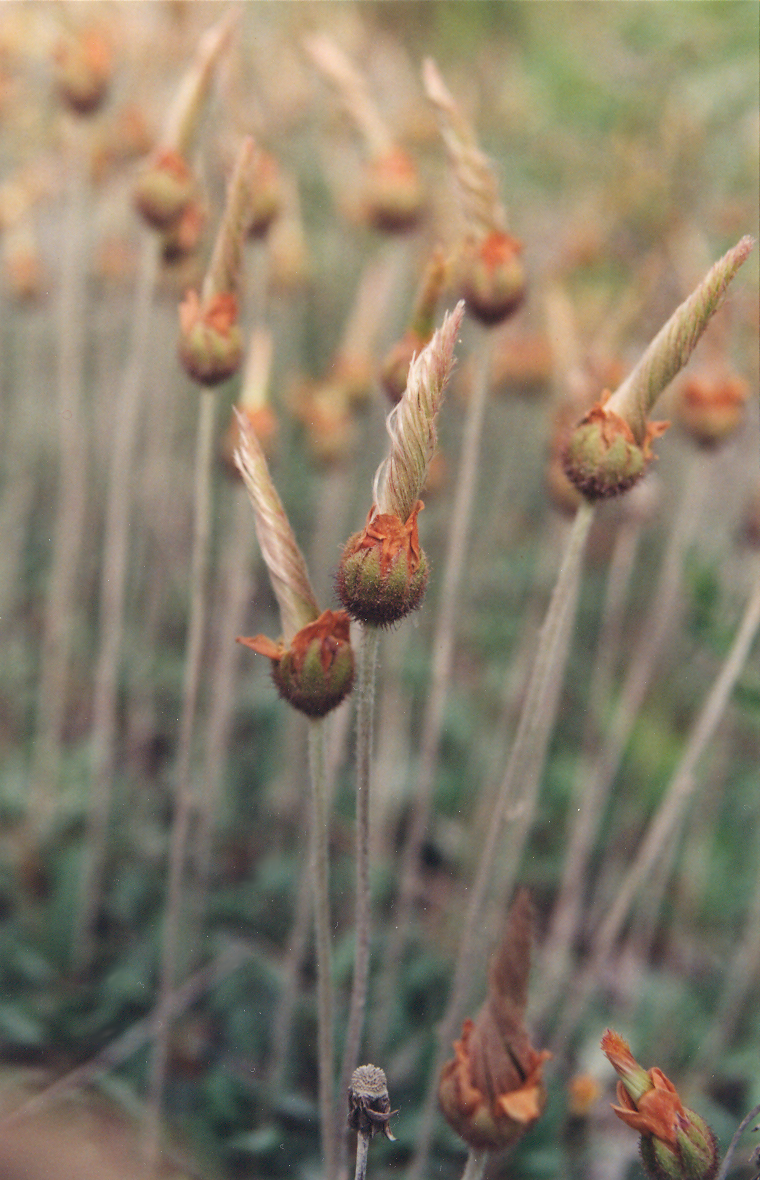
Dryas drummondii Richard. – Dryade de Drummond. – (Drummond's mountain-avens), Anticosti Island, Trans-Anticosti Route, km 144, secteur Vauréal

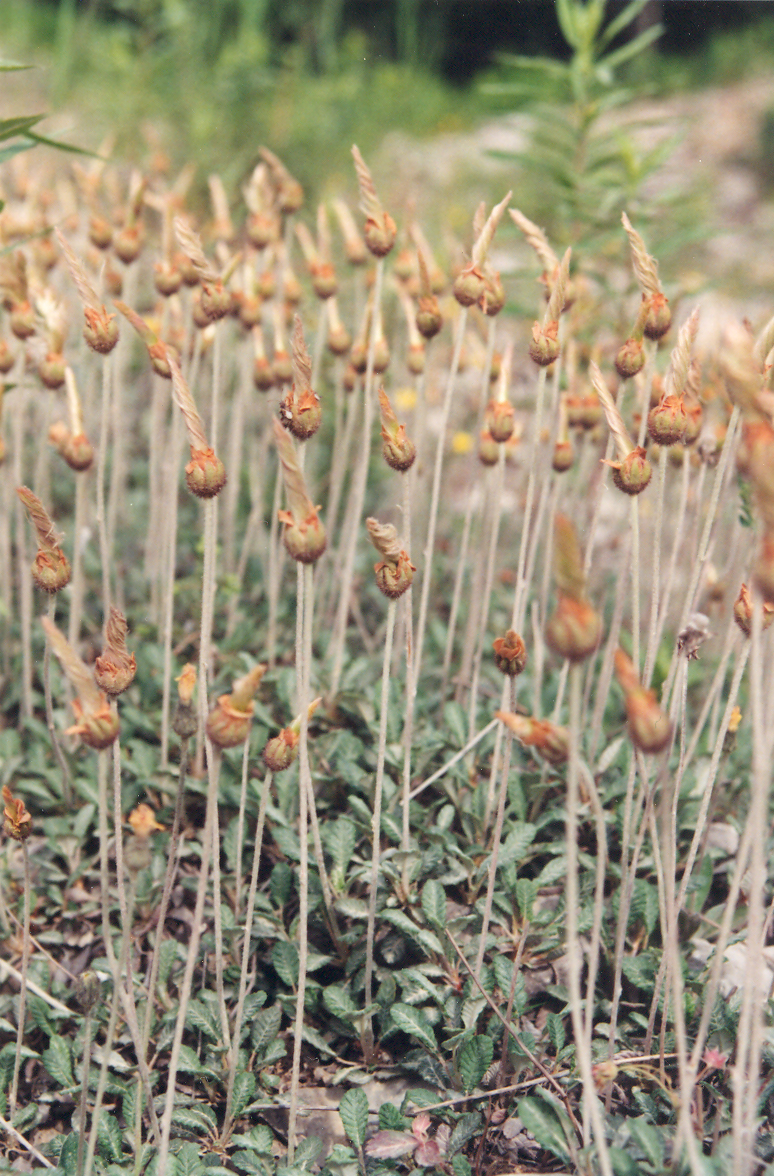
Dryas drummondii Richardson. – Dryade de Drummond. – (Drummond's mountain-avens), Antiscosti Island, Quebec, Canada
