= Grande Coupe Beds =

Geologic formation in Quebec, Canada

- Stratigraphic range: Ordovician
- Type: Formation

Location
- Region: Quebec
- Country: Canada

The Grande Coupe Beds is a geologic formation in Quebec. It preserves fossils dating back to the Ordovician period.

== See also ==
- List of fossiliferous stratigraphic units in Quebec
