= Anse a Pierre Formation =

Geologic formation in Quebec, Canada

Anse à Pierre-Loiselle Formation
- Stratigraphic range: Silurian
- Type: Formation

Location
- Region: Quebec
- Country: Canada

The Anse à Pierre-Loiselle Formation is a geologic formation in Quebec. It preserves fossils dating back to the Silurian period.

== See also ==
- List of fossiliferous stratigraphic units in Quebec
