= Hugh Miller Cliffs Formation =

Geological formation in Quebec

- Stratigraphic range: Devonian
- Type: Formation

Location
- Region: Quebec
- Country: Canada

The Hugh Miller Cliffs Formation is a geologic formation in Quebec. It preserves fossils dating back to the Devonian period.

== See also ==
- List of fossiliferous stratigraphic units in Quebec
