= Quebec Group =

Geological group in Quebec, Canada

- Stratigraphic range: Silurian
- Type: Group

Location
- Region: Quebec
- Country: Canada

The Quebec Group is a geologic group in Quebec. It preserves fossils dating back to the Silurian period.

== See also ==
- List of fossiliferous stratigraphic units in Quebec
