= Anse Maranda Formation =

Geologic formation in Quebec, Canada

- Stratigraphic range: Cambrian
- Type: Formation

Location
- Region: Quebec
- Country: Canada

The Anse Maranda Formation is a geologic formation in the Quebec Appalachians. It preserves fossils dating back to the early Cambrian period.

== See also ==
- List of fossiliferous stratigraphic units in Quebec
