= Bic Conglomerate =

Geologic formation in Quebec, Canada

Bic Conglomerate Formation
- Stratigraphic range: Cambrian
- Type: Formation

Location
- Region: Quebec
- Country: Canada

The Bic Conglomerate Formation is a geologic formation in Quebec. It preserves fossils dating back to the Cambrian period.

== See also ==
- List of fossiliferous stratigraphic units in Quebec
