= Tetreauville Formation =

Geologic formation in Quebec, Canada

- Stratigraphic range: Trentonian
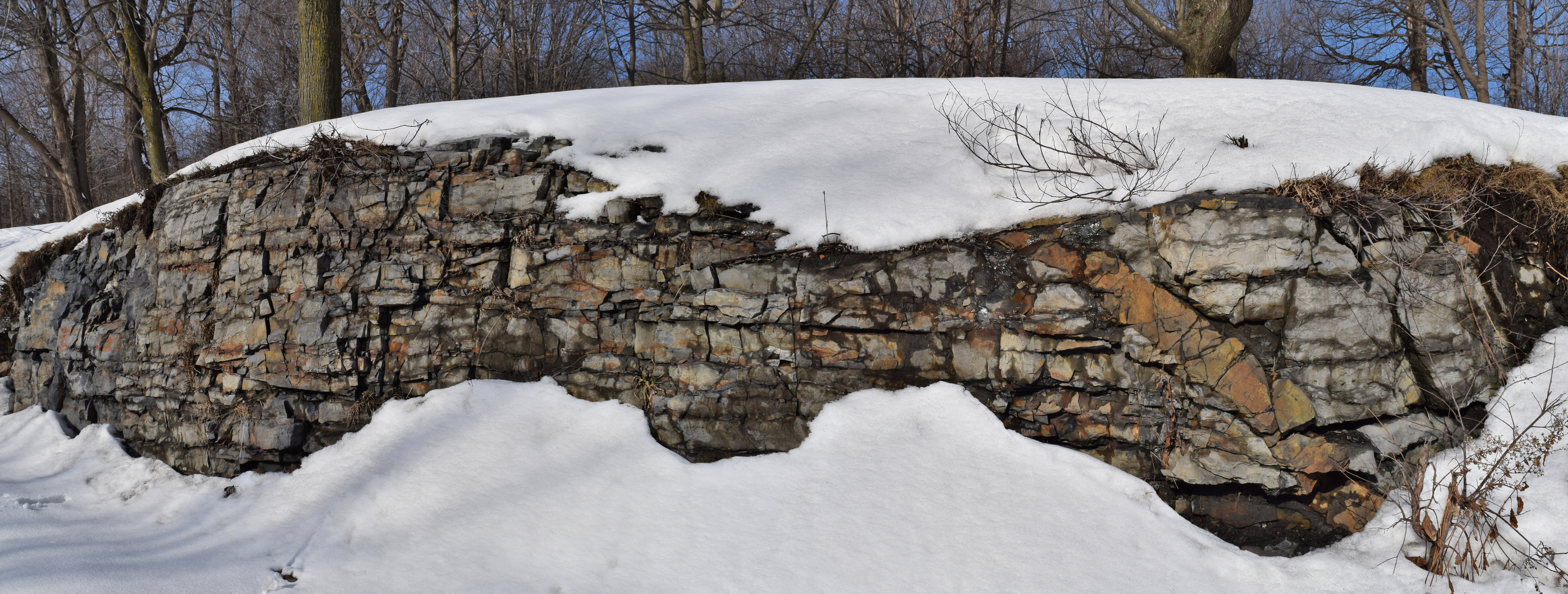
- Tetreauville Formation outcropping at the base of Mount Royal.
- Type: Geological formation
- Unit of: Trenton Group
- Underlies: Utica Shale
- Overlies: Montreal Formation
- Thickness: Up to 168 metres (550 ft)

Lithology
- Primary: Limestone
- Other: Shale

Location
- Region: Quebec
- Country: Canada

Type section
- Named for: Tétreaultville
- Named by: T. H. Clark
- Year defined: 1941

The Tetreauville Formation is a geological formation of Upper Ordovician age (Trentonian Stage), extending from the north of Trois-Rivières to the Island of Montreal.

== See also ==
- List of fossiliferous stratigraphic units in Quebec
