= Mingan Formation =

Geologic formation in Quebec, Canada

- Stratigraphic range: Ordovician
- Type: Formation

Location
- Region: Quebec
- Country: Canada

The Mingan Formation is a middle Ordovician geological formation found beneath Anticosti Island in Quebec. It is composed mainly of carbonate rocks that formed in shallow to moderately deep marine environments.

== See also ==
- List of fossiliferous stratigraphic units in Quebec
