= List of fossiliferous stratigraphic units in Quebec =

This is a list of fossiliferous stratigraphic units in Quebec, Canada.

Group or formation	Period	Notes
Anse a Pierre Formation	Silurian	
Anse Maranda Formation	Cambrian	
Anticosti Group/Becscie Formation	Silurian, Ordovician	
Anticosti Group/Chicotte Formation	Silurian	
Anticosti Group/Gun River Formation	Silurian	
Anticosti Group/Jupiter Formation	Silurian	
Aylmer Formation	Ordovician	
Battery Point Formation	Devonian	
Beauharnois Formation	Ordovician	
Becscie Formation	Silurian, Ordovician	
Beekmantown Formation	Ordovician	
Beekmantown Group/Beauharnois Formation	Ordovician	
Bic Conglomerate Formation	Cambrian	
Black River Formation	Ordovician	
Bobcaygeon Formation	Ordovician	
Broken Skull Formation	Ordovician	
Cap Bon Ami Formation	Devonian	
Chaleurs Group/Anse a PierreFormation	Silurian	
Chaleurs Group/Anse Cascon Formation	Silurian	
Chaleurs Group/Clemville Formation	Silurian	
Chaleurs Group/La Vieille Formation	Silurian	
Chaleurs Group/Weir Formation	Silurian	
Champlain Clay Formation	Canada	
Chazy Group/Laval Formation	Ordovician	
Chicotte Formation	Silurian	
Crown Point Formation	Ordovician	
Dalhousie Formation	Devonian	
Day Point Formation	Ordovician	
Ekwan River Formation	Silurian	
Ellis Bay Formation	Ordovician	
English Head Formation	Ordovician	
Escuminac Formation	Devonian	
Gascons Formation	Silurian	
Gaspe Bay Sandstone Group/Battery Point Formation	Devonian	
Gaspe Sandstone	Devonian	
Gaspe Sandstone Group/Battery Point Formation	Devonian	
Gaspe Sandstones Formation	Devonian	
Grande Greve Formation	Devonian	
Gun River Formation	Silurian	
Honorat Formation	Ordovician	
Hugh Miller Cliffs Formation	Devonian	
Indian Point Formation	Silurian	
Interlake Group/Cedar Lake Dolomite Formation	Silurian	
Jolliet Group/Ellis Bay Formation	Ordovician	
Jolliet Group/Vaureal Formation	Ordovician	
Jupiter Formation	Silurian	
La Vieille Formation	Silurian	
Laforce Formation	Silurian	
Lake Aymler Formation	Silurian	
Laval Formation	Ordovician	
Levis Formation	Cambrian	
Lorraine Formation	Ordovician	
Lorraine Group/Nicolet River Formation	Ordovician	
Luke Hill Limestone	Ordovician	
Macasty Formation	Ordovician	
Malbaie Formation	Devonian	
Mann Formation	Silurian	
Matapedia Formation	Ordovician	
Matapedia Group/Grande Coupe Beds Formation	Ordovician	
Matapédia Formation	Ordovician	
Matapédia Group/White Head Formation	Ordovician	
Merrimack Formation	Silurian	
Mictaw Formation	Ordovician	
Miguasha Group/Escuminac Formation	Devonian	
Mingan Formation	Ordovician	
Mont Wissick Formation	Silurian	
Naylor Ledge Formation	Ordovician	
Nicolet Formation	Ordovician	
Nicolet River Formation	Ordovician	
Ottawa Formation	Ordovician	
Pamelia Formation	Ordovician	
Pontgravé River Formation	Ordovician	
Quebec Group/Cabano Formation	Silurian	
Romaine Formation	Ordovician	
Roncelles Formation	Devonian	
Sargent Bay Formation	Silurian	
Severn River Formation	Silurian	
Simard Formation	Ordovician	
Solomons Corner Formation	Ordovician	
Sources Formation	Silurian	
Thornloe Formation	Silurian	
Trenton Formation	Ordovician	
Trenton Group/Chicoutimi Limestone	Ordovician	
Trenton Group/Tetreauville Formation	Ordovician	
Utica Shale	Ordovician	
Val Formation	Silurian	
Valcour Formation	Ordovician	
Vaureal Formation	Ordovician	
Vaureal and Ellis Bay Formation	Ordovician	
West Point Formation	Silurian	
White Head Formation	Silurian, Ordovician	
York River Formation	Devonian	
