= List of conodont genera =

This is a list of conodonts genera, sorted in alphabetical order.

== A-C ==
- †Acanthodus
- †Acodus
- †Acuminatella
- †Alternognathus
- †Amorphognathus
- †Ancyrodella
- †Ancyrognathus
- †Anticostiodus
- †Appalachignathus
- †Arianagnathus
- †Bactrognathus
- †Baltoniodus
- †Basselodus
- †Belodina
- †Budurovignathus
- †Carnepigondolella
- †Carniodus
- †Cavusgnathus
- †Chiosella
- †Chirodella
- †Chirognathus
- †Colaptoconus
- †Complexodus
- †Cordylodus
- †Cornuodus
- †Clarkina
- †Clydagnathus
- †Cryptotaxis
- †Ctenognathodus
- †Culumbodina
- †Curtognathus
- †Cypridodella

== D-E ==
- †Dapsilodus
- †Declinognathodus
- †Decoriconus
- †Diaphorodus
- †Diplognathodus
- †Distomodus
- †Doliognathus
- †Dollymae
- †Drepanodus
- †Eoconodontus
- †Ellisonia
- †Eolinguipolygnathus
- †Epigondolella
- †Erismodus
- †Erraticodon

== F-K ==
- †Fahraeusodus
- †Foliella
- †Furnishina
- †Gamachignathus
- †Gapparodus
- †Gnathodus
- †Gondolella
- †Hadrodontina
- †Hamarodus
- †Hertzina
- †Hindeodus
- †Histiodella
- †Iapetognathus
- †Iapetonudus
- †Idiognathodus
- †Idiognathoides
- †Istorinus
- †Jinogondolella
- †Juanognathus
- †Jumudontus
- †Kallidontus
- †Kladognathus
- †Kockelella
- †Kraussodontus

== L-O ==
- †Lanea
- †Lenodus
- †Lochriea
- †Mazzaella
- †Meiognathus
- †Mesogondolella
- †Metapolygnathus
- †Microzarkodina
- †Misikella
- †Mongolodus
- †Muellerilepis
- †Nealeodus
- †Neognathodus
- †Neohindeodella
- †Neospathodus
- †Neostreptognathodus
- †Oepikodus
- †Oistodus
- †Oulodus
- †Ozarkodina

== P-R ==
- †Paltodus
- †Palmatolepis
- †Panderodus
- †Paracordylodus
- †Parafurnishius
- †Parapachycladina
- †Paroistodus
- †Patrognathus
- †Pedavis
- †Periodon
- †Phragmodus
- †Polonodus
- †Polygnathodella
- †Polygnathus
- †Prioniodus
- †Proconodontus
- †Promissum
- †Protohertzina
- †Protognathodus
- †Protoprioniodus
- †Pseudobelodina
- †Pseudooneotodus
- †Pseudopolygnathus
- †Pteracontiodus
- †Pterospathodus
- †Pygodus
- †Rossodus

== S-Z ==
- †Scabbardella
- †Scaliognathus
- †Scolopodus
- †Scotlandia
- †Scyphiodus
- †Siphonodella
- †Spathognathodus
- †Spinodus
- †Staufferella
- †Staurognathus
- †Stereoconus
- †Strachanognathus
- †Streptognathus
- †Sweetognathus
- †Taoqupognathus
- †Taphrognathus
- †Tripodus
- †Tropodus
- †Utahconus
- †Variabiloconus
- †Vjalovognathus
- †Walliserodus
- †Westergaardodina
- †Wurmiella
- †Yaoxianognathus
- †Zieglerodina
