= St Clair Limestone (geologic formation) =

Geologic formation in the United States

St. Clair Limestone
- Stratigraphic range: Silurian; Sheinwoodian–Homerian; ~433–427 Ma
- Type: Formation Member – Illinois and Missouri
- Unit of: Bainbridge Group Hunton Megagroup
- Underlies: Lafferty Limestone in Arkansas and Moccasin Springs Formation in Illinois, Indiana, and Missouri
- Overlies: Brassfield Limestone in Arkansas and Sexton Creek Limestone in Illinois, Indiana, and Missouri

Lithology
- Primary: Limestone
- Other: Dolomite

Location
- Region: Arkansas; Illinois; Indiana; Missouri; Oklahoma
- Country: United States

Type section
- Named for: St. Clair spring, Independence County, Arkansas
- Named by: Richard Alexander Fullerton Penrose Jr. 1891

The St. Clair Limestone is a geologic unit in Arkansas, and Oklahoma. It is classified as a Geologic Member in Indiana and Missouri. It dates back to the Middle of Silurian period. It is high density, high magnesium dolomitic limestone. It was originally classified as a marble in Oklahoma due to the fact that it would hold a high polish, hence Marble City. It is sold in slabs and as tiles, in a similar manner as marble would be. This unit has many economic uses in Arkansas and Oklahoma. It is used as a construction material, manufacture of quicklime, and manganese deposits are mined as well. The St Clair is designated as a member of the Bainbridge Group in the State of Indiana. In Illinois, Missouri, Arkansas and Oklahoma it is part of the Hunton Megagroup. The St. Clair is the Basal member of the Niagaran Series, making it part of the Tippecanoe sequence. Throughout most of the Southern extent the unit is roughly 10 to 20' thick. Moving northward it thickens to approximately 80 to 100' thick in the Illinois Basin. At its northernmost reaches where it grades in to the Joliet and Racine Formations it is about 150' thick.

== Appearance ==
The St. Clair is composed of course calcite grains to fine grains. It may contain partings of claystone or Mudstone. It can range in color from light-gray to chocolate brown, or even or purplish-black. Beds of pink crinoid remains are also found with in this unit, mostly toward the base.

== Physical characteristics ==
		Imperial	Metric
Absorption by weight	ASTM C97	0.5%	0.5%
Density	ASTM C97	168 lb/ft3	2 691.10 kg/m3
Compressive strength	ASTM C170	15 889Psi	109.55MPa
Modulus of rupture	ASTM C99	972Psi	6.70MPa

== Paleofauna ==
=== Brachiopods ===
- Ancillotoechia
  - A. marginata
- Antirhynchonella
  - A. thomasi
- Atrypa
- Atrypina
  - A. erugata
- Boucotides
  - B. barrandei
- Brachymimulus
  - B. americanus
  - B. elongatus
- Cymostrophia
- Dicamaropsis
  - D. parva
- Dicoelosia
  - D. bilobella
- Dolrorthis
  - D. nanella
- Eospirifer
  - E. acutolineatus acutolineatus
  - E. acutolineatus pentagonus
- Hircinisca
  - H. havliceki
- Homoeospirella
  - H. costatula arkansana
  - H. pygmaea
- Howellella
  - H. splendens
- Kozlowskiellina
  - K. vaningeni
- Leangella
  - L. (Opikella) dissiticostella
- Leptaena
- Lissostrophia
- Meristina
  - M. clairensis
- Nanospira
  - N. clairensis
- Nucleospira
  - N. raritas
- Onychotreta
  - O. angustata
  - O. lenta
  - O. (Eilotreta) miseri
  - O. multiplicata
  - O. (Lissotreta) plicata
- Orthostrophella
  - O. clairensis
- Oxoplecia
  - O. infrequens
- Parastrophinella
  - P. lepida
- Placotriplesia
  - P. juvenis
  - P. praecipta
- Plectatrypa
  - P. arctoimbricata
- Plectodonta
- Plicocyrtia
  - P. arkansana
- Resserella
- Shaleria
- Streptis
  - S. glomerata
- Virginiata
  - V. arkansana

=== Conodonts ===
- Acodus
  - A. inornatus
  - A. unicostatus
- Ambalodus
  - A. triangularis
- Belodella
  - B. flexa
- Belodina
  - B. inclinata
- Carniodus
  - C. carnulus
  - C. carnus
- Cordylodus
  - C. delicatus
  - C. flexuosus
- Distacodus
  - D. mehli
  - D. posterocostatus>
  - D. procerus
- Distomodus
  - D. kentuckyensis
- Drepanodus
  - D. homocurvatus
- Hadrognathus
  - H. staurognathoides
- Hindeodella
  - H. equidentata
- Ligonodina
  - L. egregia
  - L. silurica
- Neoprioniodus
  - N. costatus
  - N. excavatus
  - N. multiformis
  - N. subcarnus
- Oistodus
  - O. inclinatus
- Ozarkodina
  - O. gaertneri
  - O. inclinata
  - O. media
  - O. ziegleri
- Paltodus
  - P. multicostatus
  - P. trigonius
- Panderodus
  - P. gracilis
  - P. simplex
  - P. unicostatus
- Plectospathodus
  - P. extensus
- Pterospathodus
  - P. amorphognathoides
- Spathognathodus
  - S. ranuliformis
  - S. rhenanus
  - S. wolfordi
- Trichonodella
  - T. brassfieldensis
  - T. carinata
  - T. exacta
  - T. variflexa

=== Trilobites ===
- Ananaspis
- Balizoma
- Cheirurus
  - C. phollikodes
  - C. prolixus
- Cornuporoetus
  - C. kyphora
- Dalmanites
  - D. howelli
  - D. ptyktorhion
- Decoroproetus
  - D. anaglyptus
  - D. corycoeus
- Deiphon
  - D. longifrons
- Delops
- Diacalymene
  - D. altirostris
- Encrinurus
  - E. egani
- Eophacops
  - E. fontana
- Harpidella
  - H. butorus
  - H. spinulocervix
- Lepidoproetus
  - L. (Dipharangus) xeo
- Proetidae
- Proetus
  - P. vaningeni
- Radnoria
- Raphiophorus
  - R. niagarensis
- Sphaerexochus
  - S. glaber
- Staurocephalus
  - S. lagena
  - S. oarion
- Sthenarocalymene
  - S. scutula
- Tropidocoryphinae
