= Fenxiang Formation =

Geologic formation in China

- Stratigraphic range: Ordovician (late Tremadocian-early Floian)
- Type: Geological formation
- Sub-units: Lower Limestone Member; Upper Limestone Member
- Underlies: Honghuayuan Formation
- Overlies: Nantsinkuan Formation

Lithology
- Primary: Limestone, Shale

Location
- Country: China
- Extent: Yangtze Platform

The Fenxiang Formation (also spelled Fenhshiang) is a geological formation and Konservat-Lagerstätte in the Hubei Province of China. It is notable for its exceptional preservation of sessile fauna like black corals, hydroids, and the possible pterobranch Crinisdendrum, as well as preserving pyritized pedicles of the lingulid Leontiella, a Markuelia-like scalidophoran embryo, and nematode trace fossils.

== Geology ==
The Fenxiang Formation is located in the Yangtze Platform that covers the area around the Yangtze River in South China. The Paleozoic sequences are exposed around the Huangling Anticline (convex geologic fold that exposes the oldest beds at its core) in the Three Gorges, Hubei. The lower part of the formation (the Lower Limestone Member) is mainly composed of poorly fossiliferous limestone containing allochems (grain-like elements found in carbonate rocks). The middle to upper part of the formation (the Upper Limestone Member) is composed of dark-grey to grey bioclastic (containing abundant fragments of skeletal fossils) and peloidal limestone intercalated with shale. In the west of the anticline, the Fenxiang Formation is approximately 20 m thick. It attains a thickness of 10 m in the Tianjialing section. In the east, it is approximately 40 to 50 m thick. The Fenxiang Formation was previously thought to date back to the late Tremadocian. However, the occurrence of the conodont Acodus triangularis suggests an early Floian age for the upper part of the formation.

Soft tissue preservation often occurs in shale of the Tianjialing section, the preserved soft parts appear reddish-yellow to brown. This results from pyritization, a process in which organic matter is broken down by sulfate reducing anaerobic bacteria to produce hydrogen sulfide. The sulfide can react with iron; which eventually creates pyrite. Some of the most important fossils of the Fenxiang Formation are linguloid brachiopods preserving exceptional soft parts, pyritized colony of hydroids and pyritized burrows made by nematodes.

== Paleoenvironment ==
The paleolatitude of the Fenxiang Formation was about 19°S, in tropical waters at the edge of the Yangtze carbonate platform. The Fenxiang Formation at Tianjialing was probably deposited in fairly deep-water basinal environments; however, several elements of the Tianjialing fauna were allochthonous and shallow-water in origin. These probably originated from reefs and were transported into deeper waters via ocean currents or heavy storms.

The Fenxiang Formation preserves reef buildups in the Chenjiahe and Huanghuachang sections. Reefs in the lower parts are composed of bioclastic packstones or grainstones, suggesting that they were deposited in turbulent, shallow-water (possibly less than 10 meters deep) carbonate platforms where early cementation of the sands provided substrate for bryozoan larvae to settle. Shale becomes more abundant in the upper parts, signaling a shift into a deeper-water subtidal setting.

The reefs in the Fenxiang Formation are dominated by lithistid and stromatoporoid sponges, the bryozoan Nekhorosheviella (previously identified as Batostoma jinhongshanense), Calathium, pelmatozoan echinoderms, and the calcimicrobe Girvanella. These reefs can be divided into several different communities based on their constituent organisms:

Communities in the Fenxiang Formation
Communities according to Xi et al. 2011 (Huanghuachang section)			Communities according to Adachi et al. 2012 (Chenjiahe section)	
Biofacies	Community	Dominant organisms	Communities	Dominant organisms
Shelly biofacies	Tritoechia-Pelmatozoan	Brachiopods (Tritoechia); Pelmatozoans		
Shelly biofacies	Tritoechia-Pomatotrema	Brachiopods (Tritoechia, Pomatotrema)		
Reef biofacies	"Batostoma"	Bryozoans (Nekhorosheviella); Brachiopods (Tritoechia)	Lithistid sponge-bryozoan	Bryozoans (Nekhorosheviella); Sponges (Archaeoscyphia)
Reef biofacies	Pelmatozoan-"Batostoma"	Pelmatozoans; Bryozoans (Nekhorosheviella)	Bryozoan-pelmatozoan	Pelmatozoans; Bryozoans (Nekhorosheviella)
Reef biofacies	Calathium-Archaeoscyphia	Calathium; Cyanobacteria; Sponges (Archaeoscyphia)	Lithistid sponge-calcimicrobe	Calcimicrobes (Girvanella); Sponges (Archaeoscyphia)
Reef biofacies	Archaeoscyphia	Sponges (Archaeoscyphia, Pulchrilamina)	Lithistid sponge-stromatolite	Stromatolites (incl. Girvanella); Sponges (Archaeoscyphia)
Standing-water biofacies	Acanthograptus-Dendrograptus	Graptolites (Acanthograptus, Dendrograptus, Adelograptus, Kiaerograptus)		
Standing-water biofacies	Yichangopora	Bryozoans (Yichangopora); Brachiopods (Nanorthis)		
Allochtonous biofacies	Nanorthis-Psilocephalina	Brachiopods (Nanorthis); Trilobites (Psilocephalina, Tungtzuella)		

== Fossil content ==
Color key: Taxon / Reclassified taxon / Taxon falsely reported as present / Dubious taxon or junior synonym / Ichnotaxon / Ootaxon / Morphotaxon	Notes; Uncertain or tentative taxa are in small text; ~~crossed out~~ taxa are discredited.

=== Ichnotaxa ===
Ichnotaxa
Genus	Species	Locality	Images
Sinusoidal traces probably belonging to nematodes		Huanghuachang, Tianjialing	
Large burrows			

=== Receptaculitids ===
Receptaculitidae
Genus	Species	Locality	Images
Calathium	C. sp.	Huanghuachang	

=== Sponges ===
Porifera
Genus	Species	Class	Order	Locality	Images
Heteractinida indet.		Calcarea?	Heteractinida	Huanghuachang	
Archaeoscyphia	A. chihliensis	Demospongiae	Lithistida	Huanghuachang	
Archaeoscyphia	A. minganensis	Demospongiae	Lithistida	Yichang area	
Archaeoscyphia	A. pulchra	Demospongiae	Lithistida	Huanghuachang	
Pulchrilamina	P. spinosa	Demospongiae	Stromatoporoidea(?)	Chenjiahe	

=== Cnidarians ===
==== Conulates ====
Conulata
Genus	Species	Clade	Locality	Images
Sphenothallus	S. ruedemanni	Conulata indet.	Huanghuachang, Tianjialing	
Conulariida indet.		Conulariida	Jiangjiafan	

==== Black corals ====
Antipatharia
Genus	Species	Family	Locality	Images
Sinopathes	S. reptans	Sinopathidae	Huanghuachang, Tianjialing, Gudongkou, Jiangjiafan	
Sinopathes	S. sp.	Sinopathidae	Huanghuachang, Tianjialing, Gudongkou, Jiangjiafan	
Sterictopathes	S. radicatus	Sinopathidae	Huanghuachang, Tianjialing, Gudongkou	

==== Hydroids ====
Hydrozoa
Genus	Species	Family	Locality	Images
Sinobryon	S. elongatum	Haleciidae?	Tianjialing	

=== Conodonts ===
Conodonta
Genus	Species	Order	Family	Locality	Images
Acodus	A. hamulosus	Prioniodontida	Acodontidae	Huanghuachang, Huaqiao	
Acodus	A. proclinatus	Prioniodontida	Acodontidae	Huanghuachang	
Acodus	A. suberectus	Prioniodontida	Acodontidae	Huanghuachang, Huaqiao	
Acodus	A. triangularis	Prioniodontida	Acodontidae	Tianjialing	
Acontiodus	A. rectus	Prioniodontida	Acodontidae	Huanghuachang	
Acontiodus	A. staefferi	Prioniodontida	Acodontidae	Huanghuachang	
Triangulodus	T. bicostatus	Prioniodontida	Acodontidae	Huanghuachang, Huaqiao	
Triangulodus	T. unicostatus	Prioniodontida	Acodontidae	Huanghuachang	
Tropodus	T. yichangensis	Prioniodontida	Acodontidae	Huanghuachang	
Oistodus	O. complanatus	Prioniodontida	Oistodontidae	Huanghuachang	
Oistodus	O. lanceolatus	Prioniodontida	Oistodontidae	Huanghuachang	
Oistodus	O. robustus	Prioniodontida	Oistodontidae	Huanghuachang	
Protoprioniodus	P. sp.	Prioniodontida	Paracordylodontidae	Huanghuachang	
Proconodontus	P? sp.	Proconodontida	Proconodontidae	Huanghuachang	
Scalpellodus	S. gracilis	Protopanderodontida	Acanthodontidae	Huanghuachang	
Clavohamulus	C? sp.	Protopanderodontida	Clavohamulidae	Huanghuachang	
Cornuodus	C. longibasis	Protopanderodontida	Cornuodontidae	Huanghuachang	
Drepanoistodus	D. nanjinguanensis	Protopanderodontida	Drepanoistodontidae	Huanghuachang	
Drepanoistodus	D. pitjanti	Protopanderodontida	Drepanoistodontidae	Huanghuachang, Huaqiao	
Drepanoistodus	D. sp.	Protopanderodontida	Drepanoistodontidae	Huanghuachang, Tianjialing	
Paltodus	P. brevicornis	Protopanderodontida	Drepanoistodontidae	Huanghuachang	
Paltodus	P. deltifer	Protopanderodontida	Drepanoistodontidae	Huanghuachang	
Paltodus	P. subaequalis	Protopanderodontida	Drepanoistodontidae	Huanghuachang	
Paroistodus	P. concavus	Protopanderodontida	Drepanoistodontidae	Huanghuachang	
Paroistodus	P. mistus	Protopanderodontida	Drepanoistodontidae	Huanghuachang, Huaqiao	
Teridontus	T? sp.	Protopanderodontida	Oneotodontidae	Huanghuachang	
Colaptoconus	C. quadraplicatus	Protopanderodontida	Protopanderodontidae	Huanghuachang, Huaqiao	
Drepanodus	D. amoenus	Protopanderodontida	Protopanderodontidae	Huanghuachang	
Drepanodus	D. arcuatus	Protopanderodontida	Protopanderodontidae	Huanghuachang, Huaqiao	
Drepanodus	D. latus	Protopanderodontida	Protopanderodontidae	Huanghuachang	
Drepanodus	D. sp.	Protopanderodontida	Protopanderodontidae	Huaqiao, Tianjialing	
Protopanderodus	P. yichangensis	Protopanderodontida	Protopanderodontidae	Huanghuachang	
Protopanderodus	P? cf. rectus	Protopanderodontida	Protopanderodontidae	Huaqiao	
Scolopodus	S? sp.	Protopanderodontida	Protopanderodontidae	Huanghuachang	
Serratognathus	S. diversus	Protopanderodontida	Serratognathidae	Huanghuachang	

=== Pterobranchs ===
Pterobranchia
Genus	Species	Order	Family	Locality	Images
Crinisdendrum	C. sinicum	Pterobranchia indet.		Huanghuachang, Tianjialing	

==== Graptolites ====
Graptolithina
Genus	Species	Order	Family	Locality	Images
Haplograptus	H. huanghuaensis	Graptolithina indet.		Huanghuachang	
Haplograptus	H. yichangensis	Graptolithina indet.		Huanghuachang	
"Dictyonema"	"D." asiaticum	Dendroidea	Dendroidea indet.	Huanghuachang	
"Dictyonema"	"D." cf. asiaticum	Dendroidea	Dendroidea indet.	Huanghuachang	
"Dictyonema"	"D." sp.	Dendroidea	Dendroidea indet.	Huanghuachang	
Acanthograptus	A. erectoramosus	Dendroidea	Acanthograptidae	Huanghuachang, Huaqiao	
Acanthograptus	A. rigidus	Dendroidea	Acanthograptidae	Huanghuachang	
Acanthograptus	A. sinensis	Dendroidea	Acanthograptidae	Huanghuachang, Chenjiahe, Huaqiao, Tianjialing	
Acanthograptus	A. sp.	Dendroidea	Acanthograptidae	Huanghuachang, Huaqiao	
Koremagraptus	K. sp.	Dendroidea	Acanthograptidae	Chenjiahe, Tianjialing	
Paracanthograptus	P. sanxiaensis	Dendroidea	Acanthograptidae	Huanghuachang	
Dendrograptus	D. yini	Dendroidea	Dendrograptidae	Huanghuachang	
Dendrograptus	D? mui	Dendroidea	Dendrograptidae	Chenjiahe	
Dendrograptus	D. sp.	Dendroidea	Dendrograptidae	Huanghuachang	
Mastigograptus	M? sp.	Dendroidea	Mastigograptidae	Huanghuachang	
Adelograptus	A? orientalis	Graptoloidea	Anisograptidae	Huanghuachang	
Adelograptus	A. sp.	Graptoloidea	Anisograptidae	Huanghuachang	
Kiaerograptus	K. kiaeri yichangensis	Graptoloidea	Anisograptidae	Huanghuachang	

=== Arthropods ===
==== Ostracods ====
Ostracoda
Genus	Species	Order	Family	Locality	Images
Sinoprimitia	S. hemicircularis	Palaeocopida	Palaeocopida indet.	Huanghiachang	
Sinoprimitia	S. quadrata	Palaeocopida	Palaeocopida indet.	Huanghuachang	
Leperditella	L. cf. aequilatera	Platycopida	Leperditellidae	Huanghuachang	
Leperditella	L. hubeiensis	Platycopida	Leperditellidae	Huanghuachang	
Leperditella	L. cf. mundula	Platycopida	Leperditellidae	Huanghuachang	
Leperditella	L. subsymmetrica	Platycopida	Leperditellidae	Huanghuachang	
Primitia	P. ichangensis	Platycopida	Primitiidae	Huaqiao	

==== Trilobites ====
Trilobita
Genus	Species	Order	Family	Locality	Images
Psilocephalina	P. lata	Asaphida	Asaphidae	Huanghuachang	
Psilocephalina	P. lubrica	Asaphida	Asaphidae	Huanghuachang, Huaqiao	
Psilocephalina	P. sinuata	Asaphida	Asaphidae	Huanghuachang, Huaqiao	
Asaphopsoides	A. grandispiniger	Asaphida	Hungaiidae	Huanghuachang, Huaqiao	
Asaphopsoides	A. angustatus	Asaphida	Hungaiidae	Huanghuachang	
Asaphopsoides	A. changyangensis	Asaphida	Hungaiidae	Huaqiao	
Dactylocephalus	D. laevigatus	Asaphida	Hungaiidae		
Dactylocephalus	D. transversus	Asaphida	Hungaiidae		
Tungtzuella	T. elongata	Asaphida	Taihungshaniidae	Huanghuachang	
Tungtzuella	T. kweichouensis	Asaphida	Taihungshaniidae	Huanghuachang, Huaqiao	
Tungtzuella	T. recta	Asaphida	Taihungshaniidae	Huanghuachang	
Tungtzuella	T. sinuata	Asaphida	Taihungshaniidae	Huaqiao	
Tungtzuella	T. szechuanensis	Asaphida	Taihungshaniidae	Huanghuachang, Huaqiao	
Tungtzuella	T. yunnanensis	Asaphida	Taihungshaniidae	Huanghuachang	
Chosenia	C. divergens	Corynexochida	Leiostegiidae	Huaqiao	
Chosenia	C. quadrata	Corynexochida	Leiostegiidae	Huaqiao	
Pseudocalymene		Corynexochida	Leiostegiidae	Liujiachang	
Szechuanella	S. granulata	Corynexochida	Leiostegiidae		
Parapilekia	P. inexpecta	Phacopida	Pilekiidae		
Protopliomerops	P. changyangensis	Phacopida	Pliomeridae	Huaqiao	
Protarchaeogonus	P? huaqiaoensis	Proetida	Rorringtoniidae	Huaqiao	
Goniophrys	G. subcylindricus	Proetida	Telephinidae	Huaqiao	

=== Bryozoans ===
Bryozoa
Genus	Species	Class	Order	Locality	Images
Nematopora	N. ovalis	Stenolaemata	Cryptostomata	Chenjiahe	
Prophyllodictya	P. prisca	Stenolaemata	Cryptostomata	Daping	
Prophyllodictya	P. sp.	Stenolaemata	Cryptostomata	Chenjiahe	
Treptocryptopora	T. sp.	Stenolaemata	Cryptostomata	Chenjiahe	
Veroclema	V. sp.	Stenolaemata	Cryptostomata	Chenjiahe	
Amsassipora	A. sp.	Stenolaemata	Cystoporata	Chenjiahe	
Anolotichia	A. sp.	Stenolaemata	Cystoporata	Chenjiahe	
Ceramopora	C. sp.	Stenolaemata	Cystoporata	Chenjiahe	
Fistulipora	F. sp.	Stenolaemata	Cystoporata	Chenjiahe	
Haplotrypa	H. sp.	Stenolaemata	Cystoporata	Chenjiahe	
Hennigopora	H. sp.	Stenolaemata	Cystoporata	Chenjiahe	
Profistulipora	P. sp.	Stenolaemata	Cystoporata	Chenjiahe	
Nekhorosheviella	N. nodulifera	Stenolaemata	Esthonioporata	Daping	
Nekhorosheviella	N. semisphaerica	Stenolaemata	Esthonioporata	Daping, Huanghuachang, Liujiachang	
Dianulites	D. sp.	Stenolaemata	Esthonioporata	Chenjiahe	
Orbiramus	O. minus	Stenolaemata	Trepostomata	Daping	
Orbiramus	O. normalis	Stenolaemata	Trepostomata	Daping, Huanghuachang, Liujiachang	
Orbiramus	O. ovalis	Stenolaemata	Trepostomata	Daping	
Bythopora	B. sp.	Stenolaemata	Trepostomata	Chenjiahe	
Goldfussitrypa	G. sp.	Stenolaemata	Trepostomata	Chenjiahe	
Monotrypa	M. sp.	Stenolaemata	Trepostomata	Chenjiahe	
Orbignyella	O. sp.	Stenolaemata	Trepostomata	Chenjiahe	
Trepostomata undet.		Stenolaemata	Trepostomata	Chenjiahe	

=== Brachiopods ===
Brachiopoda
Genus	Species	Class	Order	Locality	Images
Eopunctata	E. mamagouensis	Brachiopoda indet.		Huanghuachang, Huaqiao	
Eopunctata	E. sp.	Brachiopoda indet.		Huanghuachang	
Leontiella	L. sp.	Lingulata	Lingulida	Tianjialing	
Lingula	L. sp. 2	Lingulata	Lingulida	Liujiachang	
Lingula	L. sp. 3	Lingulata	Lingulida	Liujiachang	
Nanorthis	N. hamburgensis	Rhynchonellata	Orthida	Huanghuachang, Huaqiao	
Nanorthis	N. sp. 1	Rhynchonellata	Orthida	Huanghuachang	
Sinorthis	S. sp. 1	Rhynchonellata	Orthida	Liujiachang	
Martellia	M. sp. 2	Strophomenata	Billingsellida	Liujiachang	
Tritoechia	T. lianghekouensis	Strophomenata	Billingsellida	Huanghuachang	
Tritoechia	T. mucronata	Strophomenata	Billingsellida	Huanghuachang	
Tritoechia	T. obesa	Strophomenata	Billingsellida	Huanghuachang	
Tritoechia	T. recta	Strophomenata	Billingsellida	Huanghuachang	
Tritoechia	T. subconis	Strophomenata	Billingsellida	Huanghuachang, Huaqiao	
Tritoechia	T. sp. 1	Strophomenata	Billingsellida	Liujiachang	
Tritoechia	T. sp. 2	Strophomenata	Billingsellida	Huanghuachang	
Tritoechia	T. sp. 3	Strophomenata	Billingsellida	Huanghuachang	
Tritoechia	T. sp. 4	Strophomenata	Billingsellida	Huanghuachang	
Punctolira	P. huanghuaensis	Strophomenata	Pentamerida	Huanghuachang	
Syntrophinella	S. sp. 1	Strophomenata	Pentamerida	Liujiachang	
Tetralobula	T. fenxiangensis	Strophomenata	Pentamerida	Huaqiao	

=== Cephalopods ===
Cephalopoda
Genus	Species	Order	Family	Locality	Images
Daobaowanceroides	D. densum	Cephalopoda indet.		Liujiachang	
Hopeioceras	H. yichangense	Actinocerida	Actinocerida indet.	Huanghuachang	
Recurvoceras	R. changyangensis	Bisonocerida	Manchuroceratidae	Huaqiao	
Ellesmeroceras	Ellesmeroceras sp. 1	Ellesmerocerida	Ellesmeroceratidae	Huaqiao	
Ellesmeroceras	Ellesmeroceras sp. 2	Ellesmerocerida	Ellesmeroceratidae	Huaqiao	
Cyrtovaginoceras	Cyrtovaginoceras sp. 1	Endocerida	Cyrtovaginoceratidae	Liujiachang	
Pronajaceras	P. eccentricum	Endocerida	Najaceratidae	Huanghuachang	
Pronajaceras	P. hubeiense	Endocerida	Najaceratidae	Huanghuachang	
Pronajaceras	P. yichangense	Endocerida	Najaceratidae	Huanghuachang	
Proterocameroceras	P. orientale	Endocerida	Proterocameroceratidae	Huanghuachang	
Proterocameroceras	P. yichangense	Endocerida	Proterocameroceratidae	Huanghuachang	

== See also ==
- List of fossiliferous stratigraphic units in China
