= Cason Shale =

Geologic formation in Arkansas, US

- Stratigraphic range: Ordovician-Silurian
- Type: Formation
- Unit of: none
- Underlies: Brassfield Limestone
- Overlies: Fernvale Limestone
- Thickness: up to appx. 23 feet

Lithology
- Primary: Shale

Location
- Region: Arkansas
- Country: United States

Type section
- Named for: Cason tract and mine, near Batesville, Independence County, Arkansas
- Named by: Henry Shaler Williams

The Cason Shale is a Late Ordovician to Middle Silurian geologic formation in the Ozark Plateaus of Arkansas. The name was introduced in 1894 by Henry Shaler Williams in his study of Arkansas. Williams designated a type locality at what was known as the Cason tract and mine, near Batesville, Independence County, Arkansas, however, he did not assign a stratotype. As of 2017, a reference section has not been designated for this unit.

== Paleofauna ==
=== Conodonts ===
- Acodus
  - A. inornatus
  - A. unicostatus
- Ambalodus
  - A. triangularis
- Amorphognatus
- Belodella
  - B. flexa
- Belodina
  - B. inclinata
  - B. ornata
- Carniodus
- Cordylodus
  - C. delicatus
  - C. flexuosus
- Distacodus
  - D. mehli
  - D. posterocostatus
  - D. procerus
- Distomodus
  - D. kentuckyensis
- Drepanodus
  - D. homocurvatus
  - D. simplex
- Eoligonodina
  - E. delicata
- Hadrognathus
  - H. staurognathoides
- Hindeodella
  - H. equidentata
- Keislognathus
  - K. gracilis
- Ligonodina
  - L. egregia
  - L. silurica
- Neoprioniodus
  - N. bicurvatoides
  - N. planus
- Oistodus
  - O. venustus
- Ozarkodina
  - O. gaertneri
  - O. tenuis
- Paltodus
  - P. multicostatus
  - P. trigonius
- Panderodus
  - P. gracilis
  - P. miseri
  - P. simplex
  - P. sulcatus
  - P. unicostatus
- Phragmodus
  - P. undatus
- Plectospathodus
  - P. extensus
- Prioniodina
  - P. irregularis
- Pterospathodus
- Scolopodus
  - S. insculptus
- Spathognathodus
  - S. manganiferus
  - S. procerus
  - S. sweeti
  - S. wolfordi
- Tetraprioniodus
  - T. superbus
- Trichonodella
  - T. brassfieldensis
  - T. carinata
  - T. diminuta
  - T. exacta
  - T. variflexa
- Zygognathus
  - Z. mira

== See also ==
- List of fossiliferous stratigraphic units in Arkansas
- Paleontology in Arkansas
