= Hunton Megagroup =

Large carbonate geologic unit in midwestern USA

- Stratigraphic range: Rhuddanian-Eifelian; ~443 –388 Ma
- Sub-units: Arkansas: Clifty Limestone; Penters Chert; Lafferty Limestone; St Clair Limestone; Southern Illinois: Moccasin Springs Formation; St Clair Limestone; Sexton Creek Formation; Edgewood Formation; Western Illinois: Racine Formation; Joliet Limestone; Kankakee Limestone; Edgewood Formation

Lithology
- Primary: Carbonate rock: Limestone; Dolomite
- Other: Chert

Location
- Region: Arkansas, Illinois, Kansas, Kentucky, Missouri, Oklahoma

Type section
- Named for: Hunton, Coal County, Oklahoma
- Named by: Joseph A. Taff, 1902

The Hunton Megagroup also Hunton Super Group, Hunton Group, Hunton Formation and Hunton Limestone is predominantly composed of carbonate rock, deposited between the Silurian and early to mid Devonian periods. In many States it acts as a reservoir for both hydrocarbons and water.

== Stratigraphy ==
=== Clifty Limestone ===
The Clifty Limestone is a Middle Devonian geologic formation in the Ozark Plateaus of Arkansas. This thin formation can be up to 4 feet thick. The name was introduced in 1916 by Albert Homer Purdue and Hugh Dinsmore Miser in their study of northern Arkansas. They designated a stratotype along the East Fork of Little Clifty Creek in Benton County, Arkansas. The Clifty Limestone is very sandy, light blue to bluish grey.

=== Penters Chert ===
The Penters Chert is a Devonian geologic formation in the Ozark Plateaus of Arkansas. Its thickness ranges up to 90'. The name was introduced in 1921 by Hugh Dinsmore Miser in his study of Arkansas. Miser designated a type locality near the old Penters Bluff railroad station in Izard County, Arkansas, however, he did not assign a stratotype. As of 2017, a reference section has not been designated for this unit.

=== Bailey Limestone ===
The Bailey Limestone was first described by Ulrich, Buckley and Buehler, 1904, p. 110. It was named for the now abandoned town of Bailey's Landing near the village of Grand Eddy, on the Mississippi River. The formation is gray to greenish gray, silty with chert inclusions, thin-bedded, very hard limestone.

=== Lafferty Limestone ===
The Lafferty Limestone is a Middle to Late Silurian geologic formation in the Ozark Plateaus of Arkansas. The name was introduced in 1921 by Hugh Dinsmore Miser in his study of Arkansas, replacing part of the upper St. Clair Limestone. Miser designated a type locality at Tate Spring, located 1.25 miles north of the site of the old Penters Bluff railroad station in Izard County, Arkansas, however, he did not assign a stratotype. As of 2017, a reference section has not been designated for this unit.

== Paleofauna ==
=== Conodonts ===
- Acodus
  - A. inornatus
  - A. unicostatus
- Belodella
  - B. triangularis
- Distacodus
  - D. mehli
  - D. posterocostatus
  - D. procerus
- Hindeodella
  - H. equidentata
- Ligonodina
  - L. silurica
- Lonchodina
  - L. cristagalli
  - L. walliseri
- Neoprioniodus
  - N. excavatus
  - N. multiformis
- Ozarkodina
  - O. fundamentata
  - O. media
  - O. ziegleri
- Paltodus
  - P. multicostatus
  - P. trigonius
- Panderodus
  - P. gracilis
  - P. simplex
  - P. unicostatus
- Plectospathodus
  - P. extensus
  - P. flexuosus
- Polygnathoides
  - P. siluricus
- Polygnathus
  - P. lignuiformis
- Spathognathodus
  - S. hemiexpansis
  - S. primus
- Trichonodella
  - T. excavata
  - T. inconstans

=== Racine Formation ===
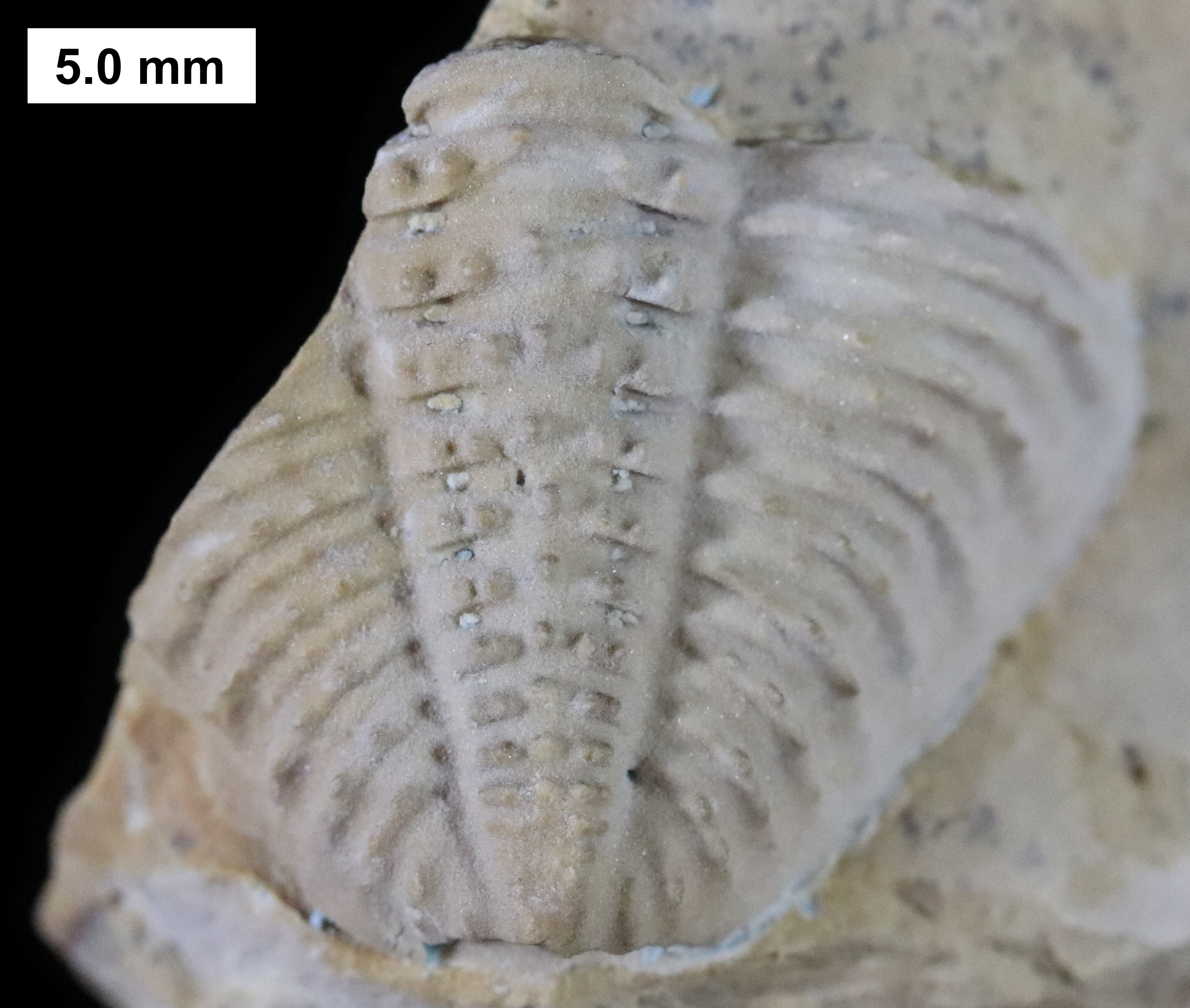
Glyptambon gassi of Racine Dolomite Formation, Illinois, Edgecombe, 1991

The Racine Formation or Racine Dolomite is found from Wisconsin south through Illinois and Iowa. Its age is from 423 to 427 million years old. It contains fossils of many species of trilobites, brachiopods, crinoids, gastropods among others This formation is found in Illinois, Iowa, Missouri and Wisconsin. The Racine is estimated to contain over 7 million barrels of oil in Illinois.

=== Moccasin Springs Formation ===
The Moccasin Springs Formation is found in Missouri, Illinois and Kentucky. It is also recognized in Indiana. This formation was first described by Becker (1974). The Moccasin Springs contains reef facies that are more common at its base. These are pure calcium carbonate (limestone). These reefs also make up the Terre Haute Bank on the eastern flank of the Illinois Basin. The top of the formation is mostly dark-gray to black dolomitic shale. This is occasionally interbedded very fine grained limestone, that is mostly dark-greenish-gray. Below is dense to fine grained limestone. It tends to be somewhat argillaceous. The colors range from pastel shades of pink, green, yellow, tan, and gray to saturated dark-gray and red to purple colors. These colors may be mottled as well.

=== St. Clair Limestone ===
The St. Clair Limestone is a geologic unit in Arkansas, and Oklahoma. It is classified as a Geologic Member in Indiana and Missouri. It dates back to the Middle of Silurian period. It is high density, high magnesium dolomitic limestone. It was originally classified as a marble in Oklahoma due to the fact that it would hold a high polish, hence Marble City. It is sold in slabs and as tiles, in a similar manner as marble would be. This unit has many economic uses in Arkansas and Oklahoma. It is used as a construction material, manufacture of quicklime, and manganese deposits are mined as well. The St Clair is designated as a member of the Bainbridge Group in the State of Indiana. In Illinois, Missouri, Arkansas and Oklahoma it is part of the Hunton Megagroup. The St. Clair is the Basal member of the Niagaran Series, making it part of the Tippecanoe sequence. Throughout most of the Southern extent the unit is roughly 10 to 20' thick. Moving northward it thickens to approximately 80 to 100' thick in the Illinois Basin. At its northernmost reaches where it grades in to the Joliet and Racine Formations it is about 150' thick.

The St. Clair is composed of course calcite grains to fine grains. It may contain partings of claystone or Mudstone. It can range in color from light-gray to chocolate brown, or even or purplish-black. Beds of pink crinoid remains are also found with in this unit, mostly toward the base.

=== Sexton Creek Limestone ===
The Sexton Creek Limestone is Silurian in age 443 - 441 Ma. Named by (Savage, 1909, p. 518) revised by (Ulrich, 1911). It was named for Sexton Creek in Alexander County, Illinois. The Sexton Creek is composed of Limestone, Dolomite and Chert. In parts of the unit there may be as much as 60% chert. In Indiana the Sexton Creek unconformably overlies Ordovician aged rock. Further west it overlies the Edgewood Formation.

In exposures the following fossils have been found; Distacodus obliquicostatus, Pterospathodus amorphognathoides, Kockelella ranuliformis.
