= Barreirinha Formation =

Geologic formation in Brazil

- Stratigraphic range: late Frasnian; ~380–376 Ma
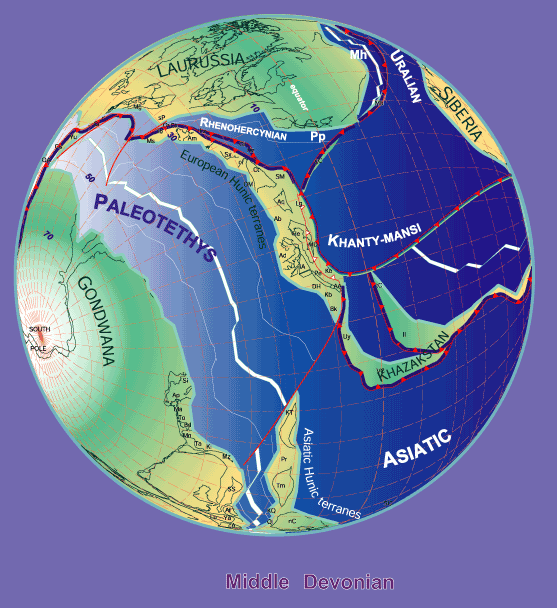
- Late Devonian paleogeography (380 Ma)
- Type: Geological formation

Lithology
- Primary: Black shale
- Other: Sandstone, pyrite

Location
- Coordinates: 4.1°S 58.0°W
- Approximate paleocoordinates: 64.3°S 36.4°W
- Region: Amazonas
- Country: Brazil
- Extent: Amazon Basin

Type section
- Named for: Barreirinha
- Barreirinha Formation (Brazil)

The Barreirinha Formation is a late Frasnian geologic formation of the Amazon Basin in the state of Amazonas of northern Brazil. The group comprises deep marine black shales and sandstones.

== Fossil content ==
The formation has provided conodont fossils of:

- Mehlina gradata
- Ozarkodina aff. sannemanni
- Cryptotaxis sp.
- Polygnathus sp.
- ?Prioniodina sp.
