= Blanchard Springs Caverns =

Cave system in Arkansas, United States

Blanchard Springs Cavern
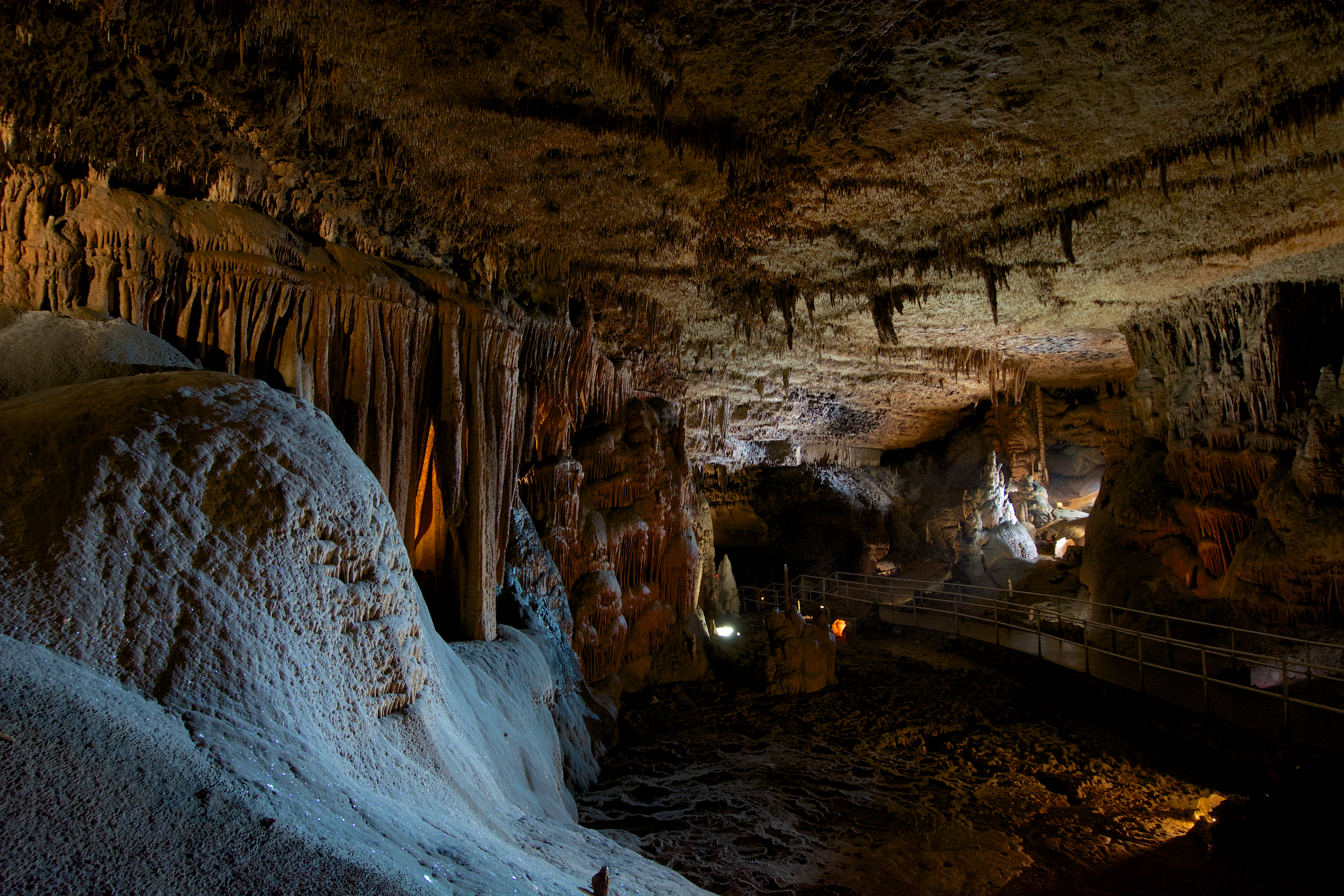
- Speleothems in Blanchard Springs Cavern

- Location within Arkansas Location within the United States
- Location: Stone County, Arkansas, U.S.
- Nearest city: Mountain View
- Coordinates: 35°57′49.26″N 92°10′45.58″W
- Governing body: United States Forest Service

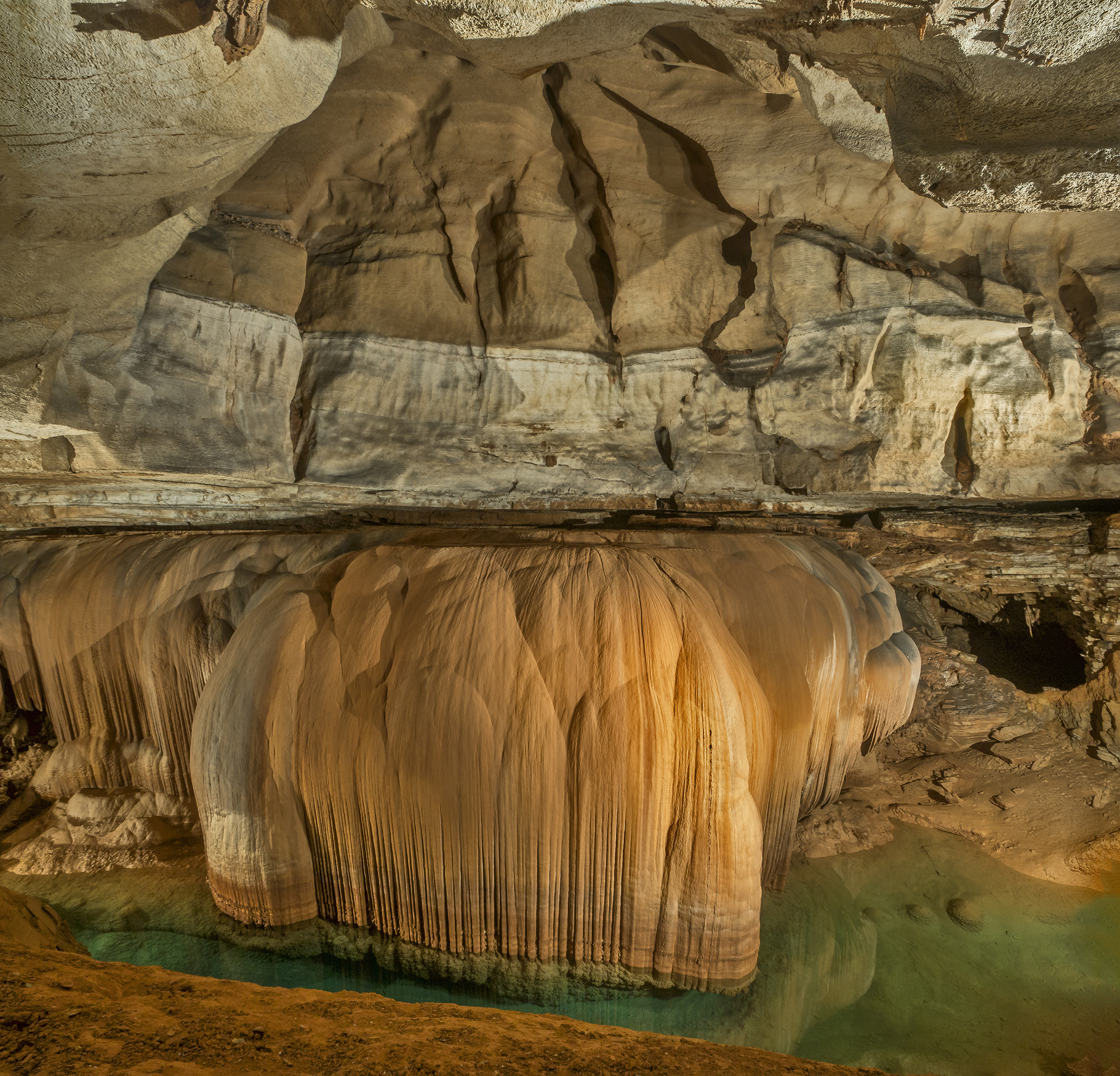
The "Giant Flowstone" in Blanchard Springs Caverns, seen on the Discovery Tour.

Blanchard Springs Caverns is a cave system located in the Ozark–St. Francis National Forest in Stone County in northern Arkansas, USA, 2 miles (3.2 km) off Highway 14 a short distance north of Mountain View. It is the only tourist cave owned by the United States Forest Service and the only one owned by the federal government outside the National Park System. Blanchard Springs Caverns is a three-level cave system, all of which can be viewed on guided tours.

The Dripstone Trail runs through the uppermost level of caverns for about a 0.5 miles (0.80 km) and opened in 1973. The Discovery Trail opened in 1977 and loops through a 1.2 miles (1.9 km) section of the cavern, descending to the lower level of the cave, 366 feet (112 m) underground, as well as to the Natural Entrance, about 100 feet (30 m) below ground at that point, following the stream bed of the springs that created the cavern. This trail includes the Rimstone Dams, which create pools along the stream bed, and the Ghost Room, a small but very well decorated room in the uppermost level, with its huge white flowstone. Also offered is a "Wild Cave" tour which allows access to undeveloped parts of the cave to more adventurous visitors. It follows the upstream section of the cave, allowing visitors to see all three levels as the original explorers did, continuing beyond where the Discovery Trail ends.

== History ==
Residents knew about the cave by the 1930s and called it Half-Mile Cave. Systematic explorations began in the 1950s and continued sporadically in the 1960s. Explorers discovered a skeleton in the cave in 1955 which was incomplete; a cause of death could not be ascertained. The caverns were opened to the public in 1973 after 10 years of development on the Dripstone Trail.

== Geology ==
With 8.1 miles (13.0 km) of surveyed passage, Blanchard is the second longest cave in Arkansas and the largest in volume. The limestone rock from which the caves and their formations developed was laid down in an ancient sea more than 350 million years ago. The cave is in middle Ordovician to lower Mississippian rocks and extends through six stratigraphic formations. The cave has shown over five levels of passage development, but the upper two levels have eroded away as deepening valleys on the surface cut into them. The cave's formation was largely phreatic in nature (formed below the water table) and passages have elliptical cross-sections typical of these formations. During the cave's development, active streams have been pirated from one level down to another without much vadose erosion occurring. The present stream currently rises from the cave at Blanchard Springs itself, at the same temperature as the cave, a constant, year-round 58 °F (14 °C).

Most of the lower-level Discovery Route is in the approximately 100 feet (30 m) thick Plattin limestone whereas the Dripstone tour route in the uppermost level of the cave spans three units, the Boone Chert, Cason Shale and the Fernvale Limestone.

Blanchard remains a "living" cave in part because of the care given by visitors and the United States Forest Service. Thus, the formations inside continue to grow as calcite is actively deposited by seeping and dripping water. One of the outstanding examples of formation growth is the Giant Flowstone, one of the largest in the U.S., at 164 feet (50 m) long, 33 feet (10 m) wide, and 30 feet (9.1 m) thick.
