= Kimmswick Limestone =

Geologic formation in the United States

- Stratigraphic range: Sandbian-Katian (Trentonian-Shermanian); ~458–446 Ma
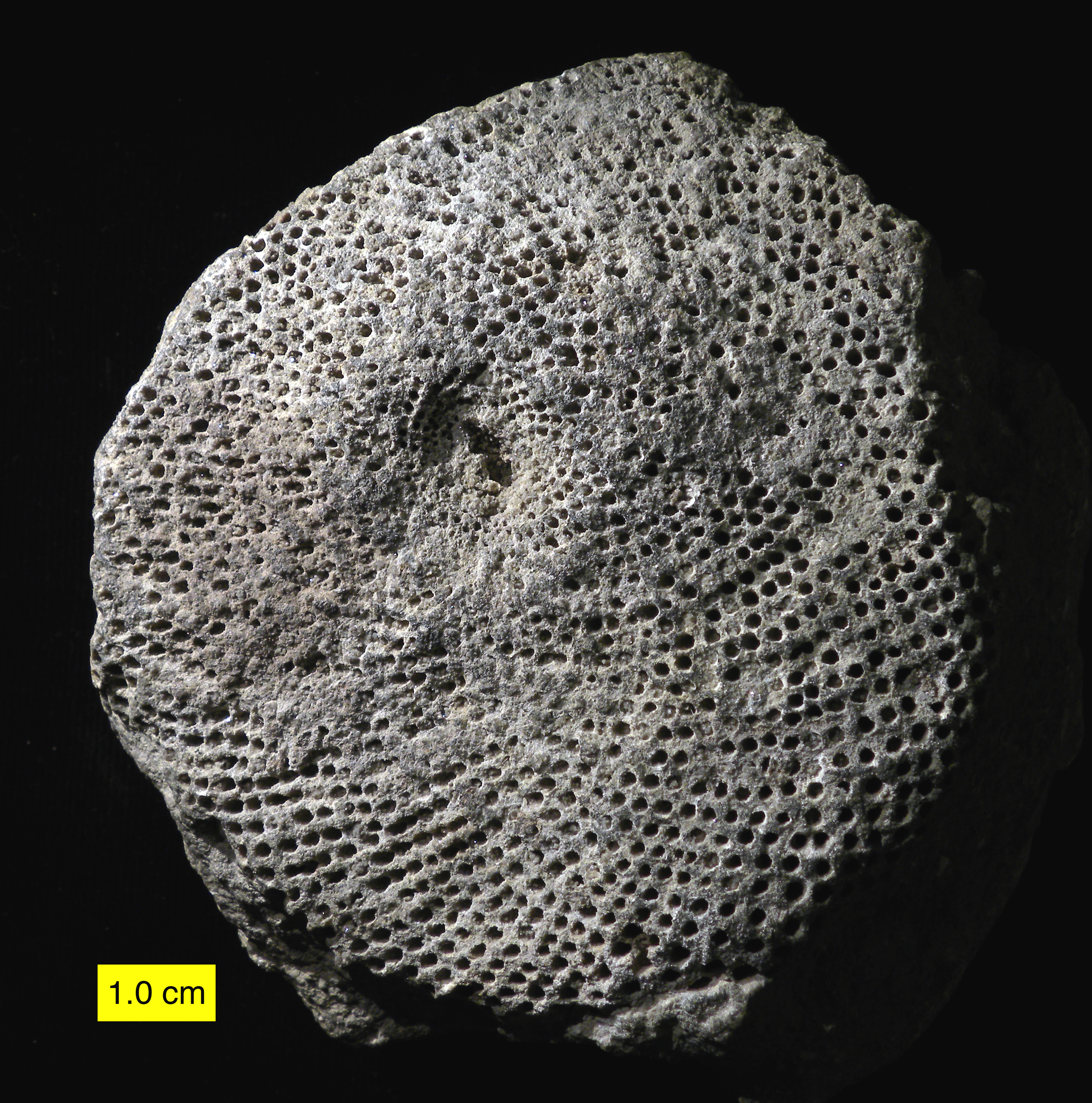
- Fossil from the Kimmswick Limestone (Missouri)
- Type: Formation
- Underlies: Cape Limestone, Maquoketa Group or the Fernvale Limestone in Arkansas
- Overlies: Decorah Shale or Plattin Limestone

Lithology
- Primary: Limestone
- Other: Sandstone, dolomite

Location
- Coordinates: 39.2°N 90.8°W
- Approximate paleocoordinates: 23.1°S 66.0°W
- Region: Arkansas, Illinois, Missouri
- Country: United States

Type section
- Named for: Kimmswick, Jefferson County, Missouri
- Named by: Edward Oscar Ulrich
- Year defined: 1904
- Kimmswick Limestone (the United States) Kimmswick Limestone (Missouri)

The Kimmswick Limestone is an Ordovician geologic formation in Arkansas, Illinois and Missouri. Fossils occurring in the Kimmswick include corals, bryozoans, brachiopods, conodonts, trilobites, crinoids and mollusks.

== Fossil content ==
The following fossils have been reported from the formation:

=== Conodonts ===
- Acodus

A. unicostatus

- Acontiodus

A. alveolaris

- Ambalodus

A. elegans
A. pulcher
A. triangularis

- Aphelognathus

A. abrupta
A. polita

- Belodina

B. compressa

- Cordylodus

C. delicatus
C. flexuosus

- Dichognathus

D. brevis
D. scotti
D. typica

- Distacodus

D. falcatus

- Drepanodus

D. homocurvatus
D. suberectus

- Eoligonodina

E. delicata

- Icriodella

I. superba

- Keislognathus

K. gracilis

- Oistodus

O. abundans
O. inclinatus
O. parallelus

- Ozarkodina

O. concinna

- Panderodus

P. compressus
P. ellisoni
P. fornicalis
P. gracilis
P. simplex

- Phragmodus

P. undatus

- Prioniodina

P. furcata

- Rhynchognathodus

R. divaricatus
R. typicus

- Sagittodontus

S. robustus

- Scolopodus

S. insculptus

- Tetraprioniodus

T. superbus

- Trichonodella

T. exacta

- Zygognathus

Z. curvata
Z. mira

=== Trilobites ===
- Eobronteus

E. slocomi

== See also ==
- List of fossiliferous stratigraphic units in Arkansas
- List of fossiliferous stratigraphic units in Illinois
- List of fossiliferous stratigraphic units in Missouri
