= Anchignathodontidae =

Scientific classification
- Kingdom: Animalia
- Phylum: Chordata
- Infraphylum: Agnatha
- Class: †Conodonta
- Order: †Ozarkodinida
- Family: †Anchignathodontidae; Clark, 1972

Genera
- See text

Extinct family of jawless fishes

Anchignathodontidae is an extinct conodont family.

== Genera ==
Genera are:

Aethotaxis

- †Anchignathodus
- †Diplognathodus
- †Hindeodus
- †Iranognathus
- †Isarcicella
- †Neostreptognathodus
- †Pseudohindeodus
- †Rabeignathus
