= Scotlandia =

Scotlandia may refer to:

- the 1950s start-up music for Scottish Television composed by English bandleader Geraldo (1904–1974)
- Scotlandia (conodont), an animal genus in the family Prioniodinidae
