= Artinskian =

Third stage of the Permian

- 290.1 ± 0.26 – 283.3 ± 0.4 Ma

Chronology
| ← / Permian-Triassic mass extinction event; ← / end-Capitanian extinction event; ← / Olson's Extinction |
Subdivision of the Permian according to the ICS, as of 2023. Vertical axis scale: Millions of years ago

Etymology
- Name formality: Formal

Usage information
- Celestial body: Earth
- Regional usage: Global (ICS)
- Time scale(s) used: ICS Time Scale

Definition
- Chronological unit: Age
- Stratigraphic unit: Stage
- Time span formality: Formal
- Lower boundary definition: FAD of the Conodont Sweetognathus whitei
- Lower boundary GSSP: Dalny Tulkas section, Southern Ural Mountains, Russia; 53.9247°N 56.51615°E
- Lower GSSP ratified: February 2022
- Upper boundary definition: Not formally defined
- Upper boundary definition candidates: Near FAD of the Conodont Neostreptognathodus pnevi
- Upper boundary GSSP candidate section(s): Mechetlino, Southern Ural Mountains, Russia

In the geologic timescale, the Artinskian is an age or stage of the Permian. It is a subdivision of the Cisuralian Epoch or Series. The Artinskian likely lasted between 290.1 and 283.3 million years ago (Ma) according to the most recent revision of the International Commission on Stratigraphy (ICS) in 2024. It was preceded by the Sakmarian and followed by the Kungurian.

== Stratigraphy ==
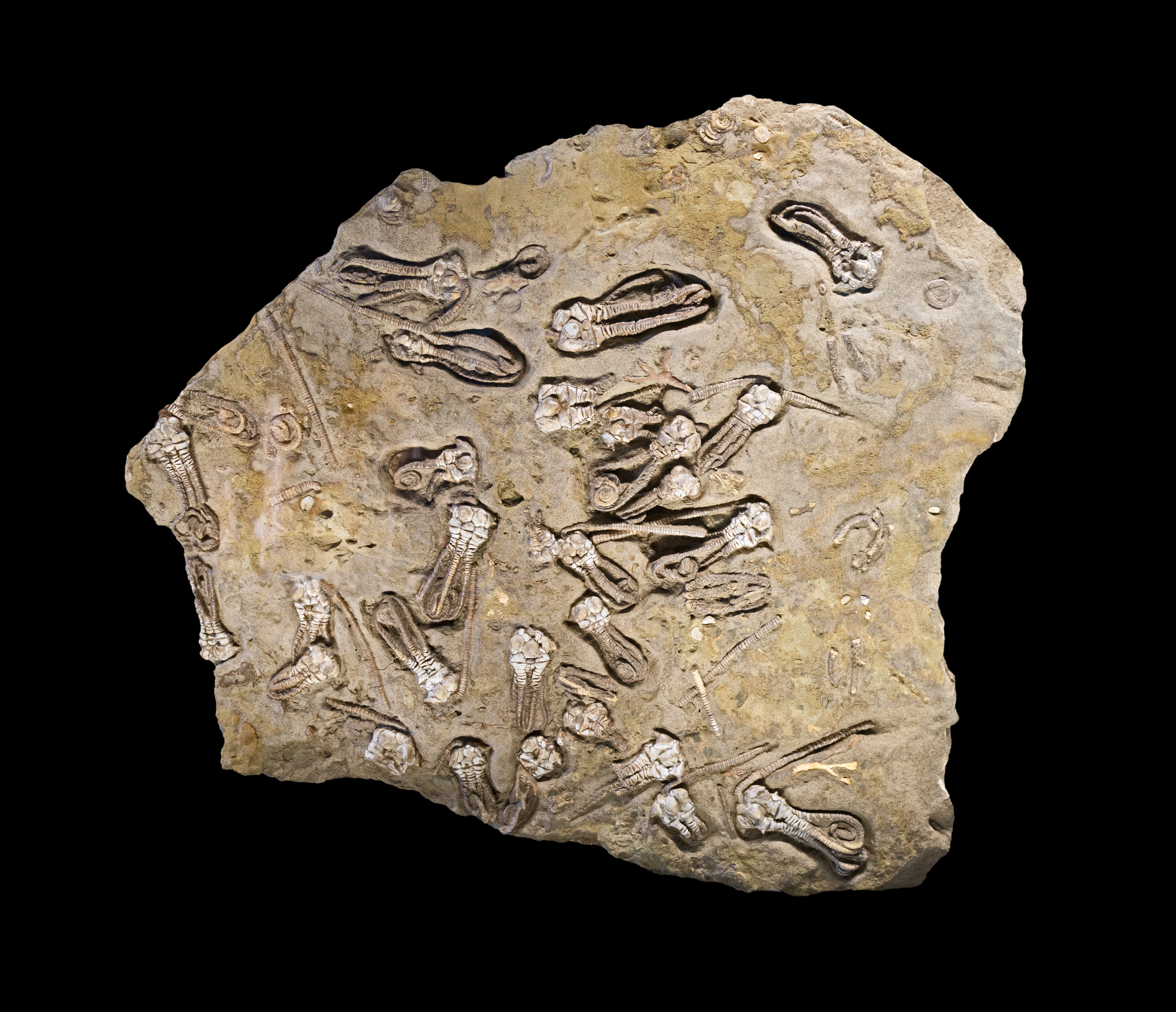
Jimbacrinus bostocki Artinskian of Australia. (Found near Jimba Jimba Station )

The Artinskian is named after the goniatite grits of Artinsk which was introduced by Roderick Murchison, Édouard de Verneuil and count Alexander von Keyserling in their The Geology of Russia in Europe and the Ural Mountains (1845). The grits of Artinsk, in turn, get its name from the Artinsky District, centered around the Russian town of Arti (formerly Artinsk zavod), situated in the middle Urals, about 170 km southwest of Yekaterinburg. The stage was introduced into scientific literature by Alexander Karpinsky in 1874.

=== Base of the Artinskian ===
The base of the Artinskian Stage is defined as the first appearance datum (FAD) of the conodont species Sweetognathus whitei and Mesogondolella bisselli. In order to constrain this age, the ICS subcommission on Permian stratigraphy informally proposed a candidate GSSP in 2002, later followed by a formal proposal in 2013. The proposed GSSP location — the Dal'ny Tulkas roadcut in the Southern Urals, near the town of Krasnousolsky — was eventually ratified in February 2022.

U-Pb radiometric dating found that the base of the Artinskian was approximately 290.1 million years old (Ma), based on the position of the rock layer at the Dal'ny Tulkas roadcut containing the FAD of S. whitei relative to three precisely dated ash beds surrounding it. Earlier radiometric reported a much younger age of 280.3 Ma for the Sakmarian-Artinskian boundary.

=== Top of the Artinskian ===
The top of the Artinskian (and the base of the Kungurian) is defined as the place in the stratigraphic record where fossils of conodonts Neostreptognathodus pnevi and Neostreptognathodus exculptus first appear. The proposed GSSP candidate — the Mechetlino section (Southern Urals).

== Artinskian Warming Event ==
Around 287 million years ago occurred an interval of pronounced warming known as the Artinskian Warming Event (AWE). This period of global warming accelerated the deglaciation that had been occurring since the Sakmarian following the end of the most intense glacial phase of the Late Palaeozoic Ice Age. In addition, it is also associated with significant global drying, which had gradually been occurring since the Carboniferous-Permian boundary. Major aridification during the AWE is evidenced by a positive δ^{18}O excursion observed in brachiopod fossils, with arid and semi-arid conditions expanding across much of Pangaea as glaciers receded to refugia in the polar regions of Gondwana.
