= Jupiter Formation =

Geologic formation in Quebec, Canada

- Stratigraphic range: Early Silurian (Aeronian-Telychian) 440.8–433.4 Ma
- Type: Geological formation
- Sub-units: From the base upwards: Goéland Member; East Point Member; Richardson Member; Cybèle Member; Ferrum Member; Pavillon Member
- Overlies: Gun River Formation
- Thickness: 167 meters

Location
- Region: Quebec
- Country: Canada

Type section
- Named for: Jupiter River
- Named by: Schuchert and Twenhofel
- Year defined: 1910

The Jupiter Formation is a geologic formation in Quebec, well-exposed in the southern third of Anticosti Island and lying in the St Lawrence River Valley. It preserves fossils dating back to the Silurian period.

== Fossil content ==
Color key: Taxon / Reclassified taxon / Taxon falsely reported as present / Dubious taxon or junior synonym / Ichnotaxon / Ootaxon / Morphotaxon	Notes; Uncertain or tentative taxa are in small text; ~~crossed out~~ taxa are discredited.

=== Trace Fossils ===
Trace fossils
Genus	Species	Presence	Material	Notes	Images
Klemmatoica	K. linguliforma	Goéland Member.	Associated with the brachiopod Rowellella and the shell of a Phanerotrema.		
Trypanites		Goéland Member.	Borings in gastropod shells.		

=== Vertebrates ===
Conodonts
Genus	Species	Presence	Material	Notes	Images
Icriodella	I. deflecta	Lower two members.		Material originally thought to be from the Gun River Formation.	

=== Invertebrates ===
Brachiopods
Genus	Species	Presence	Material	Notes	Images
Clorinda	C. (Phricoclorinda) chaloupensis	Cybèle Member.	A749 (112, mostly well-preserved); A850 (178); A937 (about 100, some embedded in small blocks); A939 (44); A1040 (105); A1047 (1); A1064b (76); A1125 (68).		
Clorinda	C. tumidula	Goéland, Richardson, Ferrum and Pavillon Members.			
Clorinda	C. superundata	Goéland Member			
Costistricklandia	C. brevis	Pavillon Member.	"A279b (1 broken ventral valve, 1 small slab with interiors exposed) and A333 (>10 fragmentary, disarticulated valves)".		
Costistricklandia	C. gaspeensis	Pavillon Member (top).	A 107-108 (1); A 279b (5 broken valves on small slab); A281 (3); A418-5 (10 valves on slabs); A554 (2).		
Dihelictera	D. acrolopha	East Point Member.	Several hundred specimens.		
Ehlersella	E. davidsonii	Cybèle and Ferrum members.			
Ehlersella	E. transulcata	Basal Ferrum Member.	A 185 (a crushed shell) and A 1066b (32, variously damaged).		
Joviatrypa	J. brabyla	Lower Goéland Member.	Several thousand specimens.		
Microcardinalia	M. (Chiastodoca) salterii	Ferrum Member			
Microcardinalia	M. (Chiastodoca) richardsoni	Goéland and Richardson members.			
Microcardinalia	M. (Chiastodoca) fabatina	Upper Ferrum Member.	A101 (270 specimens).		
Microcardinalia	M. (Dauphinella) divaricata	Cybèle and Ferrum members.			
Microcardinalia	M. (Dauphinella) melissa	Uppermost Ferrum Member and Pavillon Member.			
Microcardinalia	M. (Dauphinella) sp.	Ferrum and Pavillon Members.	A255 (16 free shells, 6 slabs with shells in life position) and A108 (1 specimen).		
Parastrophinella	P. ops	Upper Richardson Member.	A1158 (3 shells).		
Parastrophinella	P. sp.	East Point Member and Ferrum Member.	A863 (1 shell) and A959 (1 shell).		
Pentameroides	P. subrectus	Pavillon Member.	"A333 (about 1 conjoined shell; 40 incomplete specimens), A 1395 (6 conjoined shells, 12 ventral valves)".		
Pentamerus	P. oblongus	Richardson, Cybèle, Ferrum and Pavillon Members.			
Pentamerus	P. palaformis	Goéland Member.		Also found in the Gun River Formation.	
Rowellella	R.? anticostiensis	Goéland Member.	Specimen associated with the shell of a Phanerotrema and the trace fossil Klemmatoica linguliforma.	A lingulid.	
Stricklandia	S. gwelani	Goéland Member.		Also found in the Gun River Formation.	
Stricklandia	S. planirostrata	Ferrum Member.			

Corals
Genus	Species	Presence	Material	Notes	Images
Acidolites	A. sp.			An unnamed species of the genus.	

Cornulitids
Genus	Species	Presence	Material	Notes	Images
Conchicolites		Goéland Member.	Two individuals encrusting the surface of a Clathrodictyon, which itself is associated with a Phanerotrema shell.		

Echinoderms
Genus	Species	Presence	Material	Notes	Images
Perforocycloides	P. nathalieae	Cybèle Member.	MPEP335.7.	A cyclocystoid.	
Rhenopyrgus	R. viviani	Cybèle Member to Pavillon Member.		An edrioasteroid.	

Gastropods
Genus	Species	Presence	Material	Notes	Images
Phanerotrema	P. sp.	Goéland Member.	Shells, some with Trypanites borings or other associated organisms.	A phanerotrematid.	

Sponges
Genus	Species	Presence	Material	Notes	Images
Clathrodictyon		Goéland Member.	Specimen found growing on a Phanerotrema shell.	A stromatoporoid.	

Trilobites
Genus	Species	Presence	Material	Notes	Images
Encrinurus	E. deomenos				
Dalmanites	D. jupiterensis				

== See also ==
- List of fossiliferous stratigraphic units in Quebec
