= Fernvale Limestone =

Geologic formation in Alabama, Arkansas, Illinois, Missouri, Oklahoma and Tennessee

- Stratigraphic range: Ordovician
- Type: Formation
- Underlies: Cason Shale
- Overlies: Kimmswick Limestone
- Thickness: 0 to 100+ feet in Arkansas

Lithology
- Primary: Limestone

Location
- Region: Arkansas, Tennessee
- Country: United States

Type section
- Named by: Charles Willard Hayes and Edward Oscar Ulrich

The Fernvale Limestone is a geologic formation in Alabama, Arkansas, Illinois, Missouri, Oklahoma, and Tennessee. It preserves fossils dating back to the Ordovician period.

== Paleontology ==
=== Brachiopods ===
- Lepidocyclus
  - L. cooperi
  - L. oblongus

=== Conodonts ===
- Acodus
  - A. unicostatus
- Acontiodus
  - A. alveolaris
- Ambalodus
  - A. triangularis
- Amorphognatus
  - A. ordovicica
- Aphelognathus
  - A. polita
- Belodina
  - B. compressa
  - B. inclinata
  - B. ornata
  - B. penna
  - B. profunda
- Cordylodus
  - C. delicatus
  - C. flexuosus
- Dichognathus
  - D. brevis
  - D. scotti
  - D. typica
- Distacodus
  - D. falcatus
- Drepanodus
  - D. homocurvatus
  - D. suberectus
- Eoligonodina
  - E. delicata
- Icriodella
  - I. superba
- Keislognathus
  - K. gracilis
- Oistodus
  - O. abundans
  - O. inclinatus
  - O. parallelus
  - O. venustus
- Ozarkodina
  - O. inclinata
  - O. tenuis
- Paltodus
  - P. trigonius
- Panderodus
  - P. compressus
  - P. ellisoni
  - P. fornicalis
  - P. gracilis
  - P. homosimilaris
  - P. panderi
  - P. simplex
  - P. sulcatus
- Phragmodus
  - P. undatus
- Prioniodina
  - P. furcata
- Rhynchognathodus
  - R. divaricatus
  - R. typicus
- Sagittodontus
  - S. robustus
- Scolopodus
  - S. insculptus
- Trichonodella
  - T. exacta
  - T. diminuta
  - T. tenuis
- Zygognathus
  - Z. curvata
  - Z. mira

== See also ==
- List of fossiliferous stratigraphic units in Arkansas
- List of fossiliferous stratigraphic units in Tennessee
- Paleontology in Arkansas
- Paleontology in Tennessee
