= Distomodontidae =

Scientific classification
- Kingdom: Animalia
- Phylum: Chordata
- Infraphylum: Agnatha
- Class: †Conodonta
- Clade: †Prioniodontida
- Family: †Distomodontidae; Klapper in Clark et al., 1981

Genera
- †Anticostiodus; †Distomodus; †Moskalenkodus

Extinct family of jawless fishes

Distomodontidae is an extinct family of conodonts.

== Genera ==
Genera are:

- †Anticostiodus
- †Distomodus
- †Moskalenkodus
