= Curtognathus =

Curtognathus Temporal range: 460.9–449.5 Ma

Scientific classification
- Kingdom: Animalia
- Phylum: Chordata
- Infraphylum: Agnatha
- Class: †Conodonta
- Order: †Prioniodinida
- Family: †Chirognathidae
- Genus: †Curtognathus; Branson & Mehl, 1933

Species
- †Curtognathus cordiformis Branson and Mehl; †Curtognathus coronata; Curtognathus cristatus Moskalenko, 1970; †Curtognathus ehatfieldensis (Stauffer); †Curtognathus elegans Moskalenko, 1970; †Curtognathus limitaris Branson and Mehl; †Curtognathus peculiaris Branson and Mehl; †Curtognathus robustus

Extinct genus of jawless fishes

Curtognathus is an extinct genus of conodonts from the Ordovician in the family Chirognathidae.
