= Nealeodus =

Nealeodus Temporal range: Middle Ordovician

Scientific classification
- Kingdom: Animalia
- Phylum: Chordata
- Infraphylum: Agnatha
- Class: †Conodonta
- Order: †Prioniodinida
- Genus: †Nealeodus; Stouge, 2012

Genus of jawless fish

Nealeodus is a genus of conodonts which existed in what is now Canada during the middle Ordovician. It was described as a new genus for the species Lenodus martinpointensis by Svend Stouge in 2012.
