= Ellisonia =

Scientific classification
- Kingdom: Animalia
- Phylum: Chordata
- Infraphylum: Agnatha
- Class: †Conodonta
- Order: †Prioniodinida
- Family: †Ellisoniidae
- Genus: †Ellisonia; Müller (1956)

Type species
- †Ellisonia triassica

Species
- †Ellisonia conflexa (Ellison); †Ellisonia latilaminata; †Ellisonia peculiaris (Sweet 1970)

Extinct genus of jawless fishes

Ellisonia is an extinct genus of conodonts in the family Ellisoniidae.
