= Ellisoniidae =

Scientific classification
- Kingdom: Animalia
- Phylum: Chordata
- Infraphylum: Agnatha
- Class: †Conodonta
- Order: †Prioniodinida
- Family: †Ellisoniidae; Clark, 1972

Genera
- †Ellisonia; †Foliella; †Hadrodontina; †Parapachycladina; †Parafurnishius; †Stepanovites

Extinct family of jawless fishes

Ellisoniidae is an extinct family of conodonts, a kind of primitive chordate.

== Genera ==
Genera are:

- †Ellisonia
- †Foliella
- †Hadrodontina
- †Parapachycladina
- †Parafurnishius
- †Stepanovites
