= Idiognathodontidae =

Scientific classification
- Kingdom: Animalia
- Phylum: Chordata
- Infraphylum: Agnatha
- Class: †Conodonta
- Order: †Ozarkodinida
- Family: †Idiognathodontidae; Harris & Hollingsworth 1933

Genera
- †Gnathodus; †Heckelina; †Idiognathodus; †Idiognathoides; †Neognathodus; †Protognathodus; †Streptognathodus

Extinct family of jawless fishes

Idiognathodontidae is an extinct conodont family.

Genera are Gnathodus, Idiognathodus, and Protognathodus.
