= Gilbert Klapper =

Gilbert Klapper is a paleontologist.

In 1971, with Graeme M. Philip, he described the conodont family Cryptotaxidae and the conodont genus Cryptotaxis.

In 1981, he described the conodont families Distomodontidae and Kockelellidae.

== Awards ==
He received the Pander Medal, an award from the Pander Society, an informal organisation founded in 1967 for the promotion of the study of conodont palaeontology.
