= Willi Ziegler =

German paleontologist

Willi Ziegler (born 13 March 1929 in the neighborhood of Villingen in Hungen, Hessen; died 8 August 2002) was a German paleontologist.

== Works ==
In 1969, he described the conodont genus Protognathodus.

In 1984, with Charles A. Sandberg, he described the conodont genus Alternognathus.

In 2002, with IA Bardashev and K Weddige, he described the conodont genus Eolinguipolygnathus.

=== Ziegler's Catalogue of Conodonts ===
- Ziegler's Catalogue of Conodonts. Schweizerbart Science Publishers (link to editor website, retrieved 7 May 2016)
  - Volume I, 1973
  - Volume II, 1975
  - Volume III, 1977
  - Volume IV, 1981
  - Volume V, 1991

== Awards and tributes ==
In 1998, he received the Goethe-Plakette des Landes Hessen, the highest award by the Hessian Ministry for Science and the Arts in Hesse, Germany.

He was also a recipient of the Pander Medal, awarded by the Pander Society, for researches in conodonts paleontology.

The conodont genus name Zieglerodina and the conodont species name Lochriea ziegleri are tributes to W. Ziegler.
