= Foliella =

Scientific classification
- Kingdom: Animalia
- Phylum: Chordata
- Infraphylum: Agnatha
- Class: †Conodonta
- Order: †Prioniodinida
- Family: †Ellisoniidae
- Genus: †Foliella; Budurov & Pantic 1973

Species
- †Foliella gardenae (Staesche 1964)

Extinct genus of jawless fishes

Foliella is an extinct genus of conodonts in the family Ellisoniidae.
