= Heinz Kozur =

German paleontologist and stratigrapher

Heinz Walter Kozur (born 26 March 1942 in Hoyerswerda; died 20 December 2013 in Budapest) was a German paleontologist and stratigrapher.

In 1974, with Mock, he described the conodont genus Misikella, in 1975, with Merrill, the genus Diplognathodus, in 1977, the genus Vjalovognathus, in 1988, the genus Budurovignathus, in 1989, the genus Mesogondolella, in 1990, the genera Clarkina and Chiosella and in 2003, the genus Carnepigondolella.

In 2011, with RE Weems, he made additions to the uppermost Alaunian through Rhaetian (Triassic) conchostracan zonation of North America.
