= Chirodella =

Chirodella Temporal range: Upper Triassic

Scientific classification
- Kingdom: Animalia
- Phylum: Chordata
- Infraphylum: Agnatha
- Class: †Conodonta
- Order: †Prioniodinida
- Family: †Prioniodinidae
- Genus: †Chirodella; Hirschmann, 1959

Species
- †Chirodella dinodoides; †Chirodella gracilis; †Chirodella triquetra; †Chirodella triquetra gracilis

Extinct genus of jawless fishes

Chirodella is an extinct genus of conodonts in the family Prioniodinidae.
