= Spinodus =

Spinodus Temporal range: Ordovician

Scientific classification
- Kingdom: Animalia
- Phylum: Chordata
- Infraphylum: Agnatha
- Class: †Conodonta
- Order: †Prioniodinida
- Family: †Chirognathidae
- Genus: †Spinodus; Dzik, 1976

Genus of jawless fishes

Spinodus is a genus of conodonts. A new species, S. wardi, was described from the middle Ordovician of Canada by Svend Stouge in 2012.

== Species ==
- Spinodus spinatus (Hadding, 1913)
- Spinodus wardi Stouge, 2012
