= Hadrodontina =

Scientific classification
- Kingdom: Animalia
- Phylum: Chordata
- Infraphylum: Agnatha
- Class: †Conodonta
- Order: †Prioniodinida
- Family: †Ellisoniidae
- Genus: †Hadrodontina; Staesche, 1964

Type species
- Hadrodontina anceps

Species
- †Hadrodontina aequabilis; †Hadrodontina anceps; †Hadrodontina subsymmetrica (Müller)

Extinct genus of jawless fishes

Hadrodontina is an extinct genus of conodonts in the family Ellisoniidae.
