= Merrimack Formation =

Geologic formation in Quebec, Canada

- Stratigraphic range: Silurian
- Type: Geological formation
- Underlies: Gun River Formation

Location
- Region: Quebec
- Country: Canada

The Merrimack Formation is a geologic formation in Quebec. It preserves fossils dating back to the Silurian period.

== Fossil content ==
Color key: Taxon / Reclassified taxon / Taxon falsely reported as present / Dubious taxon or junior synonym / Ichnotaxon / Ootaxon / Morphotaxon	Notes; Uncertain or tentative taxa are in small text; ~~crossed out~~ taxa are discredited.

Brachiopods
Genus	Species	Presence	Material	Notes	Images
Cerasina	C. pycnata	Near Merrimack Point, northeastern coast of Anticosti Island.	More than 200 specimens.	Genus renamed to Cerasinella.	
Cerasinella	C. pycnata	Near Merrimack Point, northeastern coast of Anticosti Island.	More than 200 specimens.	An atrypoid originally named Cerasina.	
Fenestrirostra	F. glacialis	Middle and upper beds of the formation.		A rhynchonellid also found in the lowermost Gun River Formation.	
Fenestrirostra	F. primaeva	Lower part of the middle Merrimack Formation.		A rhynchonellid.	
Stricklandia	S. sp.		"A22=C683 (2 broken shells); A1242 (15, broken); A1329 (1 broken dorsal valve)".	Also found in the Gun River Formation.	
Virgiana	V. mayvillensis		"A505 (1 shell); A 739 (5, all broken); A 741 (33, most damaged); A842 (38, most damaged); A 1330 (12 shells)".		

== See also ==
- List of fossiliferous stratigraphic units in Quebec
