= Kungurian =

Fourth stage of the Permian

- 283.3 ± 0.4 – 274.4 ± 0.4 Ma
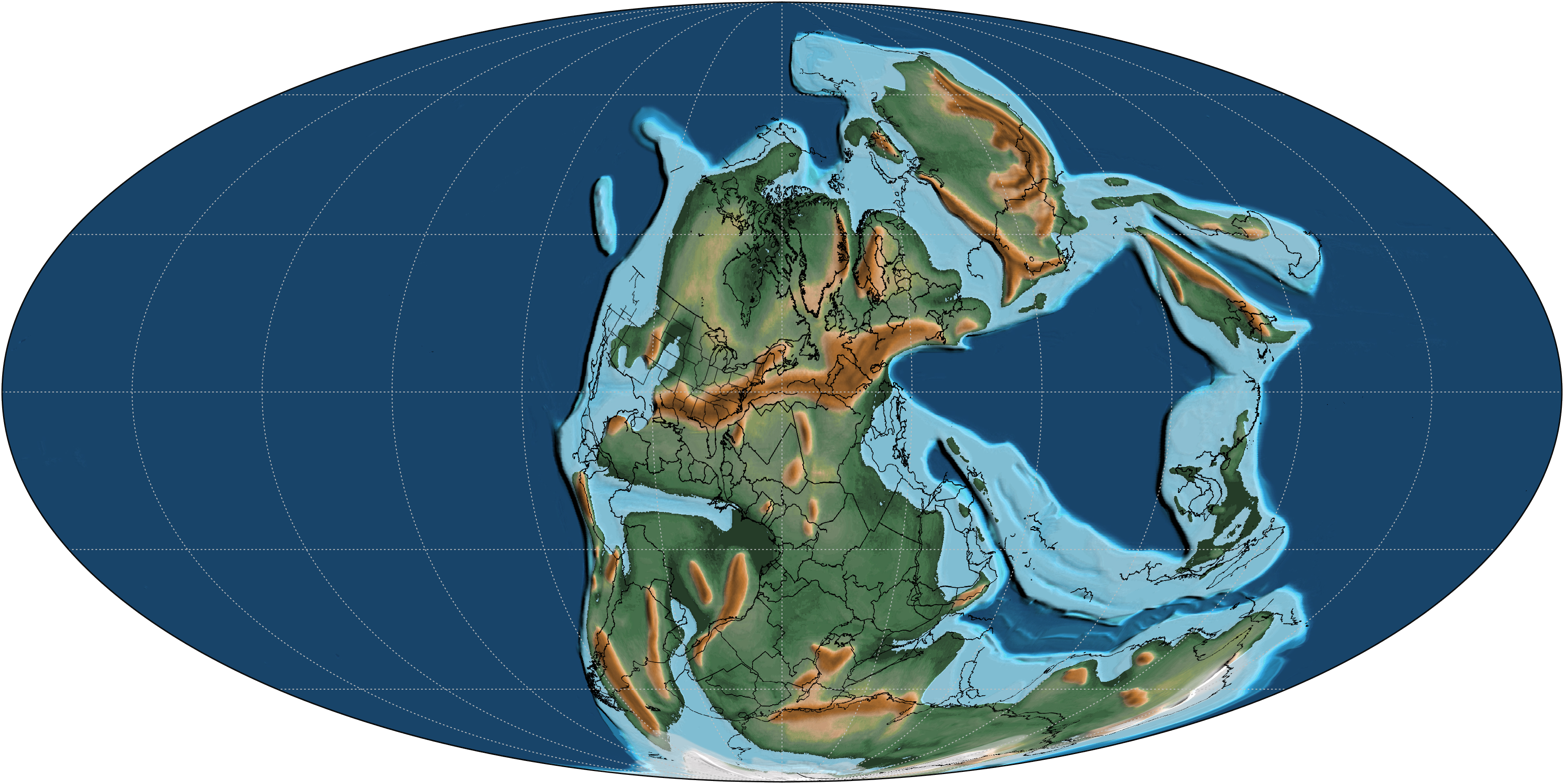
- Map of Earth near the end of the Kungurian c. 275 Ma

Chronology
← / Permian-Triassic mass extinction event; ← / end-Capitanian extinction event; ← / Olson's Extinction
Subdivision of the Permian according to the ICS, as of 2023. Vertical axis scale: Millions of years ago

Etymology
- Name formality: Formal

Usage information
- Celestial body: Earth
- Regional usage: Global (ICS)
- Time scale(s) used: ICS Time Scale

Definition
- Chronological unit: Age
- Stratigraphic unit: Stage
- Time span formality: Formal
- Lower boundary definition: Not formally defined
- Lower boundary definition candidates: Near FAD of the Conodont Neostreptognathodus pnevi
- Lower boundary GSSP candidate section(s): Mechetlino, Southern Ural Mountains, Russia
- Upper boundary definition: FAD of the Conodont Jinogondolella nanginkensis
- Upper boundary GSSP: Stratotype Canyon, Guadalupe Mountains, Texas, U.S.A. 31.8767°N 104.8768°W
- Upper GSSP ratified: 2001

In the geologic timescale, the Kungurian is an age or stage of the Permian. It is the latest or upper of four subdivisions of the Cisuralian Epoch or Series. The Kungurian lasted between 283.3 and 274.4 million years ago (Ma). It was preceded by the Artinskian and followed by the Roadian.

== Stratigraphy ==
The Kungurian is named after the Russian city of Kungur in Perm Krai. The stage was introduced into scientific literature by Russian geologist Alexandr Antonovich Stukenberg (Alexander Stuckenberg) in 1890.

The base of the Kungurian Stage is defined as the place in the stratigraphic record where fossils of conodont species Neostreptognathodus pnevi and Neostreptognathodus exculptus first appear. As of 2009, there was no agreement yet on a global reference profile (a GSSP) for the base of the Kungurian. The top of the Kungurian (the base of the Roadian and the Guadalupian series) is defined as the place in the stratigraphic record where fossils of conodont species Jinogondolella nanginkensis first appear.

The Kungurian contains three conodont biozones:

- zone of Neostreptognathodus sulcoplicatus
- zone of Neostreptognathodus prayi
- zone of Neostreptognathodus pnevi

== Kungurian life ==
The Kungurian is the last stage in which many Permo-Carboniferous clades of vertebrates (Seymouria, ophiacodontids, edaphosaurids, etc.) occur in the fossil record, and the end of this stage witnessed one of the greatest faunal turnovers of the Permian. Early studies placed Olson's Extinction just after the Kungurian, but more recent studies only indicate that this possible extinction event is located around Kungurian/Roadian boundary. However, other studies, as well as the first analyses of higher-resolution stratigraphic data suggest that this even is actually a slow decline over 20 Ma that started in the Sakmarian and that may have extended into the Roadian, with many lineages of early synapsids becoming extinct in the Kungurian. However, a more recent analysis of these high-resolution stratigraphic data using more sophisticated models does recover a mid-Kungurian crisis. Nevertheless, assessment of the extent of these extinctions is hampered by a gap in the fossil record of continental vertebrates in the late Kungurian, at least in Texas and Oklahoma, two states that have an unparalleled fossil record of such taxa for the early to mid-Kungurian,, as well as a fossil record of continental vertebrates that is restricted to higher-latide environements in the Roadian, mostly in what is now European Russia.
