= Glyptoconus =

Scientific classification
- Kingdom: Animalia
- Phylum: Mollusca
- Class: Gastropoda
- Order: Stylommatophora
- Family: Streptaxidae
- Genus: Glyptoconus; Möllendorff, 1894

Genus of gastropods

Glyptoconus is a genus of air-breathing land snails, terrestrial pulmonate gastropod mollusks in the family Streptaxidae.

== Distribution ==
The distribution of the genus Glyptoconus includes:

- Busuangga Island, the Philippines

== Species ==
Species within the genus Glyptoconus include:

- Glyptoconus mirus Möllendorff - the type species of the genus Glyptoconus

== See also ==
The conodont genus name Glyptoconus Kennedy, 1981 has been replaced by Colaptoconus in 1994.
