= Erraticodon =

Scientific classification
- Kingdom: Animalia
- Phylum: Chordata
- Infraphylum: Agnatha
- Class: †Conodonta
- Order: †Prioniodinida
- Family: †Chirognathidae
- Genus: †Erraticodon; Dzik

Species
- †Erraticodon aldridgei; †Erraticodon balticus; †Erraticodon hexianensis; †Erraticodon patu

Extinct genus of jawless fishes

Erraticodon is an extinct genus of conodonts in the family Chirognathidae.
