= Sweetognathidae =

Scientific classification
- Kingdom: Animalia
- Phylum: Chordata
- Infraphylum: Agnatha
- Class: †Conodonta
- Order: †Ozarkodinida
- Family: †Sweetognathidae; Ritter 1986

Genera
- †Meiognathus Shen et al., 2012; †Sweetognathus Clark, 1972

Extinct family of jawless fishes

Sweetognathidae is an extinct family of conodonts in the order Ozarkodinida.
