= Prioniodinidae =

Scientific classification
- Kingdom: Animalia
- Phylum: Chordata
- Infraphylum: Agnatha
- Class: †Conodonta
- Order: †Prioniodinida
- Family: †Prioniodinidae; Bassler, 1925

Genera
- †Bryantodus; †Camptognathus; †Chirodella; †Cornuramia; †Dyminodina; †Falodus; †Guizhoudella; †Gyrognathus; †Idioprionodus; †Kamuellerella; †Lagovidina; †Ligonodina; †Metalonchodina; †Multidentodus; †Neoplectospathodus; †Oulodus; †Palmatodella; †Pluckidina; †Polygnathellus; †Prioniodella; †Prioniodina; †Prionognathodus; †Pristognathus; †Scotlandia; †Subbryantodus; †Uncadina; †Veghella

Synonyms
- Hibbardellidae Mueller, 1956

Extinct family of jawless fishes

Prioniodinidae is an extinct family of conodonts in the order Prioniodinida.

== Genera ==
Genera are:

- †Bryantodus
- †Camptognathus
- †Chirodella
- †Cornuramia
- †Dyminodina
- †Falodus
- †Guizhoudella
- †Gyrognathus
- †Idioprionodus
- †Kamuellerella
- †Lagovidina
- †Ligonodina
- †Metalonchodina
- †Multidentodus
- †Neoplectospathodus
- †Oulodus
- †Palmatodella
- †Pluckidina
- †Polygnathellus
- †Prioniodella
- †Prioniodina
- †Prionognathodus
- †Pristognathus
- †Scotlandia
- †Subbryantodus
- †Uncadina
- †Veghella
