= Anticostiodus =

Anticostiodus Temporal range: Lower Silurian

Scientific classification
- Kingdom: Animalia
- Phylum: Chordata
- Infraphylum: Agnatha
- Class: †Conodonta
- Family: †Distomodontidae
- Genus: †Anticostiodus; Zhang and Barnes 2000

Type species
- †Anticostiodus fahraeusi

Species
- †Anticostiodus boltoni; †Anticostiodus fahraeusi

Extinct genus of jawless fishes

Anticostiodus is an extinct genus of multielement conodonts. Specimens have been described from the Lower Silurian (early Aeronian) of Gun River Formation of Anticosti Island, Quebec. Two species are included under the genus, Anticostiodus fahraeusi and Anticostiodus boltoni. Both species occur near the base of the Distomodus staurognathoides zone and in an open subtidal environment.
