= Kockelellidae =

Scientific classification
- Kingdom: Animalia
- Phylum: Chordata
- Infraphylum: Agnatha
- Class: †Conodonta
- Order: †Ozarkodinida
- Family: †Kockelellidae; Klapper 1981

Genera
- †Ctenognathodus; †Kockelella

Extinct family of jawless fishes

Kockelellidae is an extinct conodont family.

Genera are Ctenognathodus and Kockelella.
