= Oulodus =

Prioniodinidae Temporal range: Darriwilian-Norian, 466.0–221.5 Ma

Scientific classification
- Kingdom: Animalia
- Phylum: Chordata
- Infraphylum: Agnatha
- Class: †Conodonta
- Order: †Prioniodinida
- Family: †Prioniodinidae
- Genus: †Oulodus; Branson and Mehl 1933

Species
- †Ligonodina confluens; †Oulodus elegans; †Oulodus equirectus; †Oulodus excavatus; †Oulodus jeannae; †Oulodus petilus; †Oulodus siluricus; †Oulodus walliseri

Synonyms
- Ligonodina

Genus of jawless fishes

Oulodus is a genus of conodonts in the family Prioniodinidae.

O. elegans is found in the Late Silurian to Early Devonian Keyser Formation, a mapped limestone bedrock unit in Pennsylvania, Maryland, Virginia, and West Virginia.
