= Gun River Formation =

Geologic formation in Quebec, Canada

- Stratigraphic range: Early Silurian (Llandovery)
- Type: Geological formation
- Sub-units: Lachute Member; Innomée Member; Sandtop Member; Macgilvray Member
- Underlies: Menier Formation
- Overlies: Merrimack Formation
- Thickness: 85 to 100 meters

Location
- Region: Quebec
- Country: Canada

Type section
- Named by: Schuchert and Twenhofel
- Year defined: 1910

The Gun River Formation is a geologic formation in Quebec. It preserves fossils dating back to the early Silurian period.

== Description ==
The formation is divided into 4 members (from the base up): the Lachute, Innommée, Sandtop and Macgilvray members. The formation was deposited some 40–80 km offshore from the stable Laurentian craton, underwater at depths of 30 to 60 meters.

== Fossil content ==
=== Vertebrates ===
Color key: Taxon / Reclassified taxon / Taxon falsely reported as present / Dubious taxon or junior synonym / Ichnotaxon / Ootaxon / Morphotaxon	Notes; Uncertain or tentative taxa are in small text; ~~crossed out~~ taxa are discredited.

Conodonts
Genus	Species	Presence	Material	Notes	Images
Anticostiodus	A. fahraeusi	Anticosti Island.			
Anticostiodus	A. boltoni	Anticosti Island.			
Icriodella	I. deflecta			Probably instead belongs to the Jupiter Formation.	

=== Invertebrates ===
Brachiopods
Genus	Species	Presence	Material	Notes	Images
Brachyprion		Sandtop and Macgilvray Members.		A strophomenid.	
Coolinia		Sandtop and Macgilvray Members.			
Fenestrirostra	F. glacialis	Lowermost part of the formation.		A rhynchonellidalso found in the Merrimack Formation.	
Fenestrirostra	F. pyrrha	Lachute Member.		A rhynchonellid.	
'Gotatrypa'	'G.' sp.	Innommée Member.			
Hyattidina		Sandtop to Macgilvray Members.		An athyrid.	
Joviatrypa		Uppermost Macgilvray Member.			
Kulumbella	K. xacta	Upper Macgilvray Member.		A pentamerid.	
Mendacella		Innommée Member.		A dalmanellid.	
Meristina		Innommée Member.			
Pentamerus	P. palaformis	Top of the formation (uppermost Macgilvray Member).		Also found in the Jupiter Formation.	
Stegerhynchus					
Stricklandia	S. gwelani	Top of the formation (Macgilvray Member).		Also found in the Jupiter Formation.	
Stricklandia	S. sp.	Innommée Member.	A509 (7 broken valves on a slab).	Also found in the uppermost Merrimack Formation.	
Sypharatrypa	S. sp.	Innommée Member.			

Bryozoans
Genus	Species	Presence	Material	Notes	Images
Phaenopora	P. superba			Also found in the Becscie Formation.	
Ptilodictya	P. canadensis		USNM 143039.		
Ptilodictya	P. sulcata		USNM 143039, 143050; YPM 3063/98, 3063/104.		

Corals
Genus	Species	Presence	Material	Notes	Images
Acidolites	A. arctatus			A heliolitid.	
Brachyelasma					
Crassilasma					
Helicelasma					
Palaearaea		Cap aux Goélands (Uppermost Macgilvray Member).	Small colonies.	The only rugosan coral known from the formation, also found in the Menier formation.	
Paleofavosites	P. capax		Multiple colonies.	A tabulate coral.	

Crinoids
Genus	Species	Presence	Material	Notes	Images
Dendrocrinus					
Eumyelodactylus		Macgilvray Member.			
Laurocrinus		Macgilvray Member.			
Stupatocrinus		Macgilvray Member.			

Graptolites
Genus	Species	Presence	Material	Notes	Images
Paraclimacograptus	P. cf. innuitus	Deeper water facies of the Sandtop Member.			

Sponges
Genus	Species	Presence	Material	Notes	Images
Camptodictyon				A stromatoporoid.	
Clathrodictyon				A stromatoporoid.	

== See also ==
- List of fossiliferous stratigraphic units in Quebec
