= Meiognathus =

Meiognathus Temporal range: Kungurian

Scientific classification
- Domain: Eukaryota
- Kingdom: Animalia
- Phylum: Chordata
- Infraphylum: Agnatha
- Class: †Conodonta
- Order: †Ozarkodinida
- Family: †Sweetognathidae
- Genus: †Meiognathus; Shen et al. 2012

Type species
- †Meiognathus pustulus

Extinct genus of jawless fishes

Meiognathus is an extinct genus of conodonts belonging to the family Sweetognathidae.

Meiognathus pustulus is from the Permian (Kungurian) of Hatahoko, Japan.
