= Parapachycladina =

Parapachycladina Temporal range: Early Triassic

Scientific classification
- Kingdom: Animalia
- Phylum: Chordata
- Infraphylum: Agnatha
- Class: †Conodonta
- Order: †Prioniodinida
- Family: †Ellisoniidae
- Genus: †Parapachycladina; Zhang et al. 1997

Species
- †Parapachycladina peculiaris

Extinct genus of jawless fishes

Parapachycladina is an extinct genus of conodonts in the family Ellisoniidae, from the Early Triassic of the Beisi Formation in Guangxi Province, China.
