= Spathognathodontidae =

Spathognathodontidae Temporal range: Silurian–Devonian

Scientific classification
- Domain: Eukaryota
- Kingdom: Animalia
- Phylum: Chordata
- Infraphylum: Agnatha
- Class: †Conodonta
- Order: †Ozarkodinida
- Family: †Spathognathodontidae; Hass, 1959

Genera
- †Flajsella; †Lanea; †Ozarkodina; †Spathognathodus; †Tortodus; †Wurmiella; †Zieglerodina

Extinct family of jawless fishes

Spathognathodontidae is an extinct conodont family ranging from the Silurian to the Devonian.

== Genera ==
Genera are:

- †Flajsella
- †Lanea
- †Ozarkodina
- †Spathognathodus
- †Tortodus
- †Wurmiella
- †Zieglerodina
