= Sweetognathus =

Scientific classification
- Kingdom: Animalia
- Phylum: Chordata
- Infraphylum: Agnatha
- Class: †Conodonta
- Order: †Ozarkodinida
- Family: †Sweetognathidae
- Genus: †Sweetognathus; Clark, 1972

Species
- †Sweetognathus asymmetrica; †Sweetognathus expansus; †Sweetognathus merrelli; †Sweetognathus subsymmetricus; †Sweetognathus whitei

Extinct genus of jawless fishes

Sweetognathus is an extinct genus of conodonts in the family Sweetognathidae that evolved at the beginning of the Permian period (298.9 Ma), in near-equatorial, shallow-water seas.

The genus is characterized by pustulose ornamentation on a wide, flat-topped carina. It originated in the earliest Permian as S. expansus from Diplognathodus edentulus. Sweetognathus forms a species complex. The genus is named after paleontologist Walter C. Sweet.

Recurrent parallel species pairs have occurred throughout Sweetognathus evolution between populations originating in Bolivia, the Midwestern United States, and Russia. Parallelisms have been found to occur in the denticle morphologies of their platform elements.

== Use in stratigraphy ==
According to the List of Global Boundary Stratotype Sections and Points, the species Sweetognathus whitei made its first appearance during the Artinskian (some 290.1 ± 0.26 mya), in the Permian of the Ural Mountains.
The species Sweetognathus merrelli is near first appearance during the Sakmarian (some 295.0 ± 0.18 mya) in the Permian of Kondurovsky, Orenburg, Russia.
