= Chirognathus =

Scientific classification
- Kingdom: Animalia
- Phylum: Chordata
- Infraphylum: Agnatha
- Class: †Conodonta
- Order: †Prioniodinida
- Family: †Chirognathidae
- Genus: †Chirognathus; Branson & Mehl 1933

Species
- †C. duodactylus

Extinct genus of jawless fishes

Chirognathus is an extinct genus of conodonts in the family Chirognathidae.
