= Cryptotaxidae =

Cryptotaxidae Temporal range: Devonian

Scientific classification
- Kingdom: Animalia
- Phylum: Chordata
- Infraphylum: Agnatha
- Class: †Conodonta
- Order: †Ozarkodinida
- Family: †Cryptotaxidae; Klapper & Philip 1972

Genera
- †Cryptotaxis

Extinct family of jawless fishes

Cryptotaxidae is an extinct family of conodonts in the order Ozarkodinida. It includes the extinct genus Cryptotaxis.

== Bibliography ==
- Gilbert Klapper et Graeme M. Philip, « Devonian Conodont Apparatuses and their Vicarious Skeletal Elements », Lethaia, Wiley-Blackwell, vol. 4, no 4, octobre 1971, p. 429-452 (ISSN 0024-1164 et ISSN 1502-3931, OCLC 02277593, doi:10.1111/J.1502-3931.1971.TB01865.X)
- Cassiane N. Cardoso, Javier Sanz-López, Silvia Blanco-Ferrera, Valesca B. Lemos et Ana K. Scomazzon, « Frasnian conodonts at high palaeolatitude (Amazonas Basin, north Brazil) », Palaeogeography, Palaeoclimatology, Palaeoecology, Elsevier, vol. 418, janvier 2015, p. 57-64 (ISSN 0031-0182 et ISSN 1872-616X, OCLC 01761774, doi:10.1016/J.PALAEO.2014.11.007, )
