= Pterospathodontidae =

Scientific classification
- Kingdom: Animalia
- Phylum: Chordata
- Infraphylum: Agnatha
- Class: †Conodonta
- Order: †Ozarkodinida
- Family: †Pterospathodontidae; Cooper, 1977

Genera
- Astropentagnathus Mostler, 1967; Carniodus Walliser, 1964; Complexodus Dzik, 1976; Pranognathus Mannik & Aaldridge, 1989; Pterospathodus Walliser, 1964; Xainzadontus Yu, 1985

Extinct family of jawless fishes

Pterospathodontidae is an extinct conodont family in the order Ozarkodinida.
