= Parafurnishius =

Scientific classification
- Kingdom: Animalia
- Phylum: Chordata
- Infraphylum: Agnatha
- Class: †Conodonta
- Order: †Prioniodinida
- Family: †Ellisoniidae
- Genus: †Parafurnishius

Type species
- †Parafurnishius xuanhanensis

Extinct genus of jawless fishes

Parafurnishius is an extinct genus of conodont in the family Ellisoniidae.

The type species, P. xuanhanensis, has been described by Yang et al in 2014 in the Early Triassic (Induan) Feixianguan Formation of northeastern Sichuan Province, Southwest China.
