= Lanea =

Lanea Temporal range: Early Devonian

Scientific classification
- Domain: Eukaryota
- Kingdom: Animalia
- Phylum: Chordata
- Infraphylum: Agnatha
- Class: †Conodonta
- Order: †Ozarkodinida
- Family: †Spathognathodontidae
- Genus: †Lanea; Murphy and Valenzuela-Rios 1999

Species
- †Lanea eoeleanorae; †Lanea omoalpha; †Lanea telleri

Extinct genus of jawless fishes

Lanea is an extinct conodont genus in the family Spathognathodontidae from the Early Devonian.
