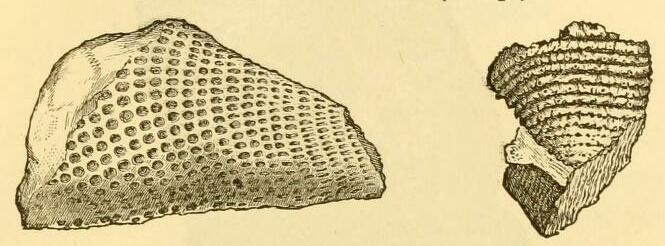
- Calathium formosum

Scientific classification
- Kingdom: Animalia
- Phylum: Porifera (?)
- Genus: †Calathium; Billings 1865

= Calathium =

Extinct genus of organism

Calathium is an extinct genus of organism found in marine beds of Ordovician age. Its classification is enigmatic: It has long been placed among the receptaculites, but it has also been described as a quasi-sponge, possibly akin to the archeocyathids or other hypercalcified sponge. The chief difference from archaeocyathids is that their walls were connected by rods rather than septae.

The organisms were important reef-forming organisms during the Ordovician, forming communities with lithistid sponges that gradually displaced the earlier microbial mounds.
