= Neohindeodella =

Scientific classification
- Kingdom: Animalia
- Phylum: Chordata
- Class: †Conodonta
- Order: †Conodontophorida
- Genus: †Neohindeodella Kozur, 1968

Type species
- Neohindeodella triassica Müller, 1956

Extinct genus of jawless fishes

Neohindeodella is an extinct genus of conodonts. Neohindeodella detrei, a species of Neohindeodella, has the distinction of being the last species of conodont to finally become extinct, during the Hettangian stage of the early Lower Jurassic Period.

== Species ==
- Neohindeodella aequiramosa Kozur & Mostler, 1970
- Neohindeodella benderi (Kozur & Mostler, 1970)
- Neohindeodella budorovi (Burij, 1979)
- Neohindeodella curvata Kozur & Mostler, 1970
- Neohindeodella detrei Kozur & Mock, 1991
- Neohindeodella dropla (Spasov & Ganev, 1960)
- Neohindeodella excurvata Götz, 1995
- Neohindeodella germanica Götz, 1995
- Neohindeodella mombergensis (Tatge, 1956)
- Neohindeodella nevadensis (Müller, 1956)
- Neohindeodella rhaetica Kozur & Mock, 1991
- Neohindeodella riegeli (Mosher, 1968)
- Neohindeodella suevica (Tatge, 1956)
- Neohindeodella sulcodentata (Budurov, 1962)
- Neohindeodella summesbergeri Kozur & Mostler, 1970
  - Neohindeodella summesbergeri summesbergeri Kozur & Mostler, 1970
  - Neohindeodella summesbergeri praecursor Kozur & Mostler, 1970
- Neohindeodella triassica (Müller, 1956)
  - Neohindeodella triassica triassica (Müller, 1956)
  - Neohindeodella triassica aequidentata Kozur & Mostler, 1970
- Neohindeodella vietnamica Thang, 1989
