= Protognathodus =

Protognathodus Temporal range: Devonian/Carboniferous

Scientific classification
- Kingdom: Animalia
- Phylum: Chordata
- Infraphylum: Agnatha
- Class: †Conodonta
- Order: †Ozarkodinida
- Family: †Idiognathodontidae
- Genus: †Protognathodus; Ziegler 1969

Species
- †Protognathodus collinsoni; †Protognathodus kockeli; †Protognathodus kuehni; †Protognathodus meischneri

Synonyms
- Protognathus (preoccupied by Protognathus Basilewsky 1950, which is considered syn. of Pseudognathaphanus Schauberger, 1932)

Extinct genus of jawless fishes

Protognathodus is an extinct conodont genus in the family Idiognathodontidae.
