= Diplognathodus =

Diplognathodus Temporal range: Carboniferous–Permian

Scientific classification
- Kingdom: Animalia
- Phylum: Chordata
- Infraphylum: Agnatha
- Class: †Conodonta
- Order: †Ozarkodinida
- Family: †Anchignathodontidae
- Genus: †Diplognathodus; Kozur & Merrill in Kozur (1975)

Species
- †Diplognathodus coloradoensis; †Diplognathodus edentulus; †Diplognathodus ellesmerensis; †Diplognathodus orphanus

Extinct genus of jawless fishes

Diplognathodus is an extinct genus of conodonts in the family Anchignathodontidae. Specimens are found in Carboniferous and Permian formations.

The genus Sweetognathus originated in the earliest Permian as S. expansus from Diplognathodus edentulus.

Diplognathodus ellesmerensis has been proposed as a marker of the Moscovian, in the Pennsylvanian age of the Carboniferous.
