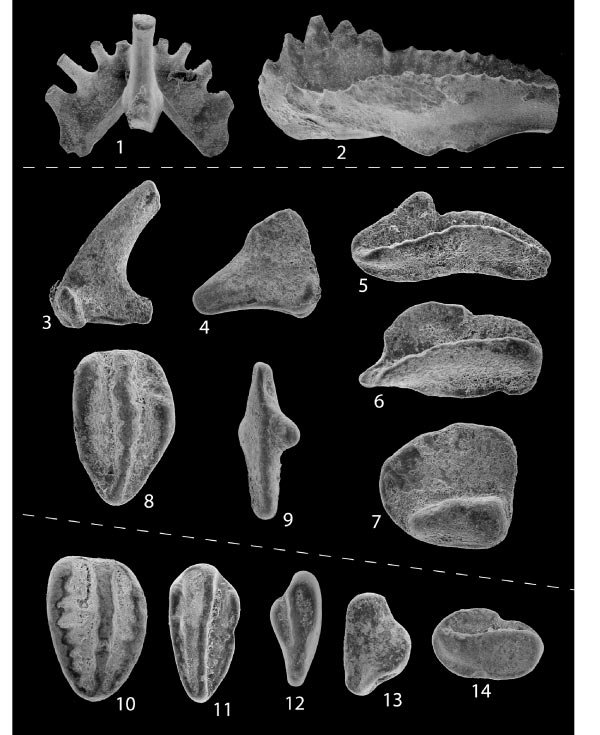
- Conodont elements from the Deer Valley Member of the Mauch Chunk Formation detail Figures 3–9. Conodonts from the uppermost Loyalhanna Limestone Member of the Mauch Chunk Formation, Keystone quarry, Pa. This collection (93RS–79b) is from the upper 10 cm of the Loyalhanna Member. Note the highly abraded and reworked aeolian forms. 9. Gnathodus texanus?, Pa element, upper view, X140. Figures 10–14. Conodonts from the basal 20 cm of the Loyalhanna Limestone Member of the Mauch Chunk Formation, Keystone quarry, Pa. (93RS–79a), and Westernport, Md. (93RS–67). Note the highly abraded and reworked aeolian forms. 12. Gnathodus sp., Pa element, upper view, reworked Late Devonian(?) through Mississippian morphotype, 93RS–67, X140.

Scientific classification
- Kingdom: Animalia
- Phylum: Chordata
- Infraphylum: Agnatha
- Class: †Conodonta
- Order: †Ozarkodinida
- Family: †Idiognathodontidae
- Genus: †Gnathodus; Pander, 1856

Species
- †Gnathodus bilineatus; †Gnathodus bollandensis; †Gnathodus postbilineatus; †Gnathodus pseudosemiglaber; †Gnathodus semiglaber; †Gnathodus texanus; †Gnathodus typicus

= Gnathodus =

Gnathodus Temporal range: Early Carboniferous

Extinct genus of jawless fishes

Gnathodus is an extinct conodont genus in the family Idiognathodontidae.

== Palaeobiology ==
=== Feeding ===
Dental microwear indicates that the occlusal cycle of Gnathodus bilineatus consisted of rotation of the P_{1} elements in the transverse plane of the anterior–posterior axis, with separation of the P_{1} elements occurring to enable the entry of food particles.

== Use in stratigraphy ==
The Tournaisian, the oldest age of the Mississippian (also known as Lower Carboniferous), contains eight conodont biozones, 3 of which are defined by Gnathodus species:

- the zone of Gnathodus pseudosemiglaber and Scaliognathus anchoralis
- the zone of Gnathodus semiglaber and Polygnathus communis
- the zone of Gnathodus typicus and Siphonodella isosticha

The Visean, the second age of the Mississippian, contains four conodont biozones, two of which are defined by Gnathodus species:

- the Gnathodus bilineatus Zone
- the Gnathodus texanus Zone

The Serpukhovian, the third or youngest age of the Mississippian, includes four conodont biozones, two of which are defined by Gnathodus species:

- the Gnathodus postbilineatus Zone
- the Gnathodus bollandensis Zone
