= Calcimicrobe =

Heterogeneous group of calcareous colonial microfossils

Characteristic of the Neoproterozoic and Cambrian periods, the heterogeneous group called calcimicrobes are calcareous colonial microfossils, which include many morphologically dissimilar organisms, whose effect in massive aggregations, in association with shelly metazoans, was to lay down the earliest recognizable reef systems: compare Archaeocyathids. The earliest recognizable patch reefs date to the Tommotian. Individual calcimicrobes laid down calcium carbonate in tubules, threads, chambered structures and other forms. The term calcimicrobe is useful in recreating the paleoecology of these systems. The term was first applied by N.P. James and D.I. Gravestock in 1990.
