= Chirognathidae =

Prioniodinida

Scientific classification
- Kingdom: Animalia
- Phylum: Chordata
- Infraphylum: Agnatha
- Class: †Conodonta
- Order: †Prioniodinida
- Family: †Chirognathidae; Branson & Mehl 1944

Genera
- †Chirognathus; †Erraticodon; †Spinodus

Extinct family of jawless fishes

Chirognathidae is an extinct family of conodonts.

Genera are Chirognathus, Erraticodon and Spinodus.
