= Neognathodus =

Neognathodus Temporal range: Bashkirian–Moscovian

Scientific classification
- Kingdom: Animalia
- Phylum: Chordata
- Infraphylum: Agnatha
- Class: †Conodonta
- Order: †Ozarkodinida
- Family: †Idiognathodontidae
- Genus: †Neognathodus; Dunn, 1968

Species
- †Neognathodus askynensis; †Neognathodus atokaensis; †Neognathodus bassleri; †Neognathodus colombiensis; †Neognathodus medexultimus; †Neognathodus roundyi; †Neognathodus symmetricus; †Neognathodus uralicus

Extinct genus of jawless fishes

Neognathodus is an extinct genus of conodonts.

== Use in stratigraphy ==
The Bashkirian, the oldest age of the Pennsylvanian (also known as Upper Carboniferous), contains six biozones based on conodont index fossils, two of which contain Neognathodus species:

- the zone of Neognathodus atokaensis
- the zone of Neognathodus askynensis

The base of the Moscovian, the second stage in the Pennsylvanian, can biostratigraphically be divided into five conodont biozones, three of which contain Neognathodus species:

- the zone of Neognathodus roundyi and Streptognathodus cancellosus
- the zone of Neognathodus medexultimus and Streptognathodus concinnus
- the zone of Neognathodus uralicus
