= Idiognathodus =

Idiognathodus Temporal range: Carboniferous

Scientific classification
- Kingdom: Animalia
- Phylum: Chordata
- Infraphylum: Agnatha
- Class: †Conodonta
- Order: †Ozarkodinida
- Family: †Idiognathodontidae
- Genus: †Idiognathodus; Gunnell 1931

Species
- †Idiognathodus boardmani Hogancamp & Barrick 2017; †Idiognathodus craticulinodosus Ishida, Suzuki & Inada 2013; †Idiognathodus espinamaenis Méndez 2012; †Idiognathodus itaitubensis Cardoso, Sanz-López & Blanco-Ferrera 2017; †Idiognathodus lateralis Hogancamp, Barrick & Strauss 2016; †Idiognathodus mendezi Méndez 2012; †Idiognathodus sagittatus; †Idiognathodus simulator; †Idiognathodus sinuosus; †Idiognathodus toretzianus

Extinct genus of jawless fishes

Idiognathodus is an extinct conodont genus in the family Idiognathodontidae.

== Use in stratigraphy ==
The species Idiognathodus simulator made its first appearance during the Gzhelian, the youngest age of the Pennsylvanian (late Carboniferous).

Two species (Idiognathodus toretzianus and Idiognathodus sagittatus) are amongst the three conodonts forming the biozones of the Kasimovian, the third stage in the Pennsylvanian.

One species (Idiognathodus sinuosus) is an index fossil of a biozone of the Bashkirian, the oldest age of the Pennsylvanian, amongst six biozones based on conodonts.

== See also ==
- List of Global Boundary Stratotype Sections and Points
