= Complexodus =

Scientific classification
- Kingdom: Animalia
- Phylum: Chordata
- Infraphylum: Agnatha
- Class: †Conodonta
- Order: †Ozarkodinida
- Family: †Pterospathodontidae
- Genus: †Complexodus; Dzik 1976

Species
- †Complexodus originalis; †Complexodus pugioniter (Drygant)

Extinct genus of jawless fishes

Complexodus is an extinct conodont genus in the family Pterospathodontidae.
