= Zieglerodina =

Scientific classification
- Kingdom: Animalia
- Phylum: Chordata
- Infraphylum: Agnatha
- Class: †Conodonta
- Order: †Ozarkodinida
- Family: †Spathognathodontidae
- Genus: †Zieglerodina; Murphy et al., 2004

Species
- †Zieglerodina remscheidensis; †Zieglerodina? tuojiangensis

Extinct genus of jawless fishes

Zieglerodina is an extinct conodont genus in the family Spathognathodontidae.

The generic name is a tribute to Willi Ziegler.
