= Eolinguipolygnathus =

Eolinguipolygnathus Temporal range: Emsian

Scientific classification
- Kingdom: Animalia
- Phylum: Chordata
- Class: †Conodonta
- Family: †Eopolygnathidae
- Genus: †Eolinguipolygnathus Bardashev, Weddige & Ziegler, 2002

Type species
- †Eolinguipolygnathus dehiscens (Philip &Jackson 1967)

Species
- †Eolinguipolygnathus radula

Extinct genus of jawless fishes

Eolinguipolygnathus is an extinct genus of conodont from the Early Devonian (Emsian).
