= Kockelella =

Kockelella Temporal range: Silurian

Scientific classification
- Kingdom: Animalia
- Phylum: Chordata
- Infraphylum: Agnatha
- Class: †Conodonta
- Order: †Ozarkodinida
- Family: †Kockelellidae
- Genus: †Kockelella; Walliser 1957

Species
- †Kockelella absidata; †Kockelella variabilis

Extinct genus of jawless fishes

Kockelella is an extinct genus of conodonts in the family Kockelellidae from the Silurian.
