= Tarqui, Huila =

Coordinates: 2°06′38″N 75°49′23″W

Tarqui
- Municipality and town
- Flag Coat of arms

- Location of the municipality and town of Tarqui in the Huila Department of Colombia.
- Country: Colombia
- Department: Huila Department

Area
  - Total: 347 km^{2} (134 sq mi)
- Elevation: 796 m (2,612 ft)

Population (Census 2018)
  - Total: 16,108
  - Density: 46.4/km^{2} (120/sq mi)
- Time zone: UTC-5 (Colombia Standard Time)

Tarqui is a town and municipality in the Huila Department, Colombia. Tarqui was also used in the Inca civilization.
