= Budurovignathus =

Budurovignathus Temporal range: Ladinian

Scientific classification
- Kingdom: Animalia
- Phylum: Chordata
- Class: †Conodonta
- Genus: †Budurovignathus Kozur, 1988

Species
- †Budurovignathus mungoensis; †Budurovignathus praehungaricus

Extinct genus of jawless fishes

Budurovignathus is an extinct genus of conodont.

== Use in stratigraphy ==
The Ladinian stage of the Middle Triassic is defined by the first appearance of Budurovignathus praehungaricus.

The global reference profile for the base (the GSSP) is at an outcrop in the river bed of the Caffaro river at Bagolino, in the province of Brescia, northern Italy.
