= Sessility =

Sessility, or sessile, may refer to:

- Sessility (motility), organisms which are not able to move about
- Sessility (botany), flowers or leaves that grow directly from the stem or peduncle of a plant
- Sessility (medicine), tumors and polyps that lack a stalk
- Sessility (in crystallography), dislocation that is not able to move in the slip plane (as opposed to glissile)

== See also ==
- Sedentism, in cultural anthropology, the practice of living in one place for a long time
- Sedentary lifestyle, a type of lifestyle involving little or no physical activity
