= Vjalovognathus =

Vjalovognathus Temporal range: Early Permian–Changhsingian

Scientific classification
- Kingdom: Animalia
- Phylum: Chordata
- Infraphylum: Agnatha
- Class: †Conodonta
- Order: †Ozarkodinida
- Family: †Vjalovognathidae; Shen, Yuan & Henderson in Yang et al., 2016
- Genus: †Vjalovognathus; Kozur 1977

Species
- Vjalovognathus carinatus Wang et al.; Vjalovognathus nicolli Yuan, Shen & Henderson in Yuan et al.

Extinct genus of jawless fishes

Vjalovognathus is an extinct genus of conodonts.

Vjalovognathus nicolli is a species from the Early Permian of the Xiala Formation in China. Vjalovognathus carinatus is from the late Permian of the Selong Formation in South Tibet, China, which is believed to be the youngest species of Vjalovognathus
