= Neostreptognathodus =

Neostreptognathodus Temporal range: Early Permian

Scientific classification
- Kingdom: Animalia
- Phylum: Chordata
- Infraphylum: Agnatha
- Class: †Conodonta
- Order: †Ozarkodinida
- Family: †Anchignathodontidae
- Genus: †Neostreptognathodus; Clark, 1972

Type species
- †Neostreptognathodus sulcoplicatus (Youngquist, Hawley, and Miller, 1951) Clark, 1972

Species
- Neostreptognathodus costatus Wang & Zhang; †Neostreptognathodus pnevi; †Neostreptognathodus exculptus; †Neostreptognathodus sulcoplicatus

Extinct genus of jawless fishes

Neostreptognathodus is an extinct genus of conodonts from the Cisuralian (Early Permian).

== Use in stratigraphy ==
The top of the Artinskian (the base of the Kungurian) stage is defined as the place in the stratigraphic record where fossils of conodont species Neostreptognathodus pnevi and Neostreptognathodus exculptus first appear.

Neostreptognathodus costatus is from the Early Permian Amushan Formation in Xiwuzhumuqin Qi, Inner Mongolia, in China.
