= Scotlandia (conodont) =

Scientific classification
- Kingdom: Animalia
- Phylum: Chordata
- Infraphylum: Agnatha
- Class: †Conodonta
- Order: †Prioniodinida
- Family: †Prioniodinidae
- Genus: †Scotlandia; Cossmann 1909

Species
- †Scotlandia morrochensis (Smith 1907)

Synonyms
- Valentia Smith 1907

Extinct genus of jawless fishes

Scotlandia is an extinct genus of conodonts in the family Prioniodinidae.
