= Rhenopyrgus =

Rhenopyrgus Temporal range: Ordovician–Middle Devonian

Scientific classification
- Kingdom: Animalia
- Phylum: Echinodermata
- Class: †Edrioasteroidea
- Order: †Edrioasterida
- Suborder: †Edrioblastoidina
- Family: †Rhenopyrgidae
- Genus: †Rhenopyrgus; Dehm, 1961

Type species
- Pyrgocystis (Rhenopyrgus) coronaeformis Rievers, 1961

Species
- Rhenopyrgus coronaeformis (Rievers, 1961); Rhenopyrgus grayae (Bather, 1915); Rhenopyrgus whitei Holloway and Jell, 1983; Rhenopyrgus flos Klug et al., 2008; Rhenopyrgus piojoensis Sumrall et al., 2012; Rhenopyrgus viviani Ewin et al., 2020

Extinct genus of marine invertebrates

Rhenopyrgus is an extinct echinoderm in the class Edrioasteroidea, which existed during the Devonian in what is now France and Germany, the Ordovician in Iowa and Illinois, U.S.A.; and the Silurian of Argentina. It was described by Dehm in 1961, and the type species is R. coronaeformis, which was originally described by J. Rievers as a species in the genus Pyrgocystis, in 1961.

A new species, R. piojoensis, was described by Colin D. Sumrall, Susana Heredia, Cecilia M. Rodríguez and Ana I. Mestre in 2012, from 116 specimens collected from the Los Espejos Formation in the Loma de Los Piojos locality near San José de Jáchal, Argentina. The species epithet refers to the locality where the specimens were collected from.

In 2019 another species, R. viviani, was described by researchers from the Natural History Museum, London, led by Tim Ewin.

The group is hypothesised to have been mud-stickers, having part of the body sticking out of the mud, allowing it to feed higher up in the water.
