= Ctenognathodus =

Scientific classification
- Kingdom: Animalia
- Phylum: Chordata
- Infraphylum: Agnatha
- Class: †Conodonta
- Order: †Ozarkodinida
- Family: †Kockelellidae
- Genus: †Ctenognathodus; Fay, 1959

Species
- †Ctenognathodus jeppssoni; †Ctenognathodus murchisoni

Extinct genus of jawless fishes

Ctenognathodus is an extinct conodont genus in the family Kockelellidae.
