= Cornuodus =

Scientific classification
- Kingdom: Animalia
- Phylum: Chordata
- Class: †Conodonta
- Genus: †Cornuodus Fahraeus, 1966

Species
- †Costiconus ethingtoni (Fåhraeus, 1966); †Cornuodus longibasis (Lindström, 1955)

Extinct genus of jawless fishes

Cornuodus is an extinct genus of conodonts.
