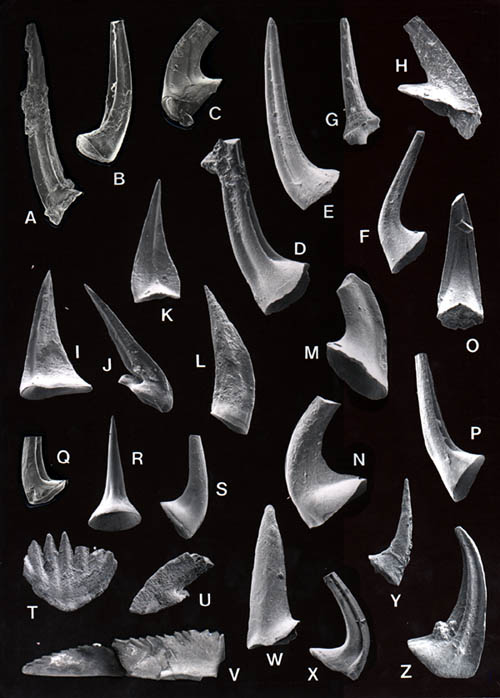
- D_E,F Colaptoconus quadraplicatus (Branson and Mehl) detail Scanning electron microscope (SEM) photomicrographs of some representative conodont elements from the Gasconade, Roubidoux, and Jefferson City formations in southeastern Missouri. Illustrated specimens are reposited in the type collections of the Paleobiology Department, U.S. National Museum (USNM), Washington, D.C. 20560. D_E, Colaptoconus quadraplicatus (Branson and Mehl); posterolateral (D) and lateral (E) views of triplicatiform and quadraplicatiform elements, respectively; D, from sample JF-H, Jacks Fork section, X 110, USNM 498499; E, from sample JC-J, lower part of Jefferson City Dolomite at Jim's Creek section, X 64, USNM 498500. F, cf. Colaptoconus quadraplicatus (Branson and Mehl); shallowly grooved specimen, from sample JF-J at Jacks Fork section, X 90, USNM 498501.

Scientific classification
- Kingdom: Animalia
- Phylum: Chordata
- Infraphylum: Agnatha
- Class: †Conodonta
- Genus: †Colaptoconus (Kennedy, 1981)

Species
- †Colaptoconus emarginatus; †Colaptoconus quadraplicatus

Synonyms
- Glyptoconus Kennedy, 1981 (syn. Glyptoconus von Moellendorff, 1894)

= Colaptoconus =

Colaptoconus Temporal range: 478.6–468.1 Ma

Extinct genus of jawless fishes

Colaptoconus is an extinct genus of conodonts.
