= Cryptotaxis =

Cryptotaxis Temporal range: Famennian

Scientific classification
- Kingdom: Animalia
- Phylum: Chordata
- Infraphylum: Agnatha
- Class: †Conodonta
- Order: †Ozarkodinida
- Family: †Cryptotaxidae
- Genus: †Cryptotaxis; Klapper & Philip 1971

Species
- †Cryptotaxis culminidirecta

Extinct genus of jawless fishes

Cryptotaxis is an extinct genus of conodonts in the family Cryptotaxidae from the Famennian (Upper Devonian).
