= Mechetlino =

Mechetlino Мечетлино
- Selo
- Location within Bashkortostan Location within Russia
- Coordinates: 55°21′N 58°00′E
- Country: Russia
- Region: Bashkortostan
- District: Salavatsky District
- Time zone: UTC+5:00

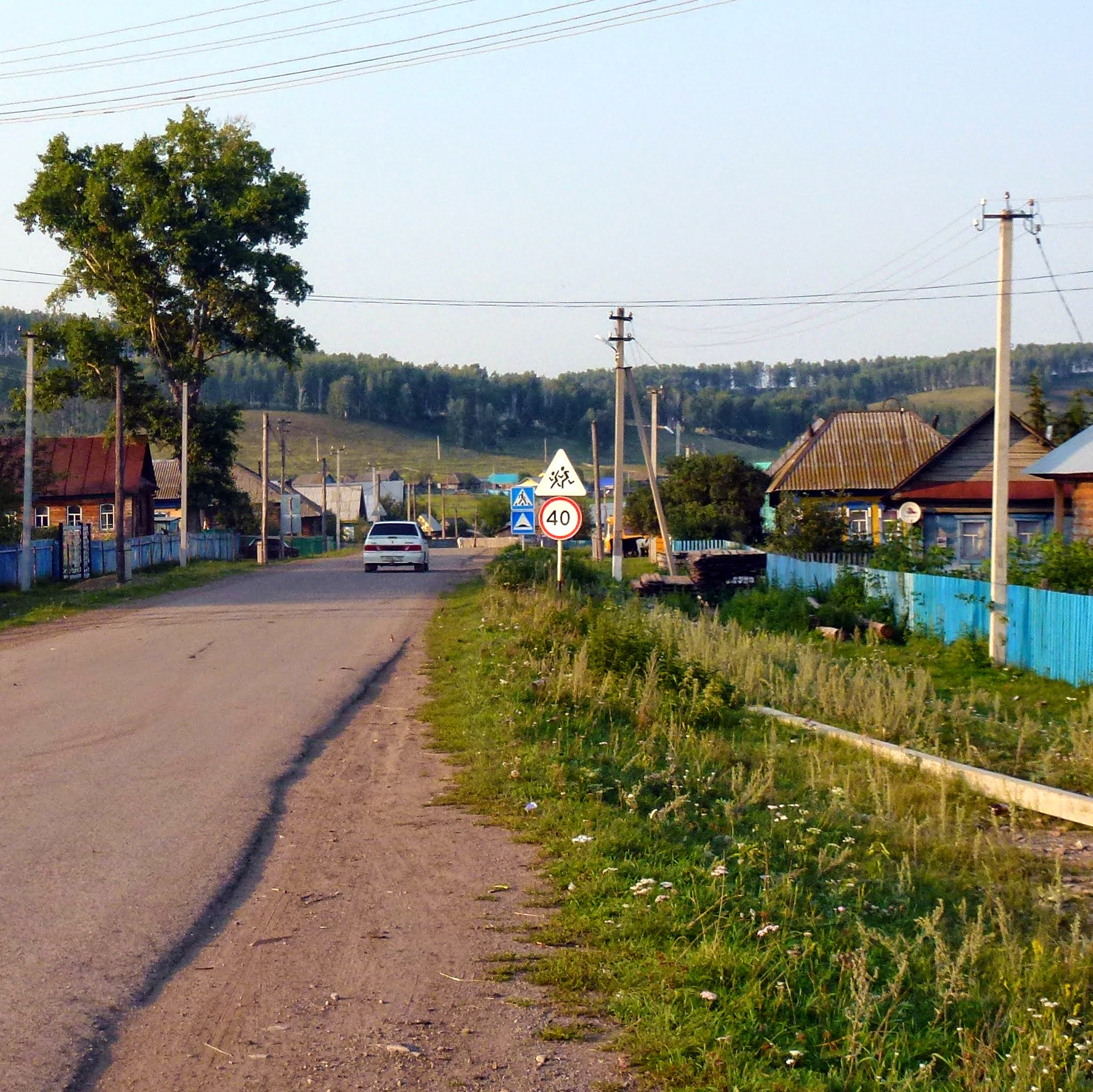
Mechetlino, Bashkortostan

Mechetlino (Russian: Мечетлино; Bashkir: Мәсетле, Mäsetle) is a rural locality (a selo) and the administrative centre of Mechetlinsky Selsoviet, Salavatsky District, Bashkortostan, Russia. The population was 713 as of 2010. There are 6 streets.

== Geography ==
Mechetlino is located 25 km north of Maloyaz (the district's administrative centre) by road. Kusepeyevo is the nearest rural locality.
