= Bainbridge Group =

Geologic group in Missouri, USA

- Stratigraphic range: Silurian
- Type: Group

Location
- Region: Missouri
- Country: United States

The Bainbridge Group is a geologic group in Missouri. It preserves fossils dating back to the Silurian period.

== See also ==
- List of fossiliferous stratigraphic units in Missouri
- Paleontology in Missouri
