= David Leigh Clark =

American paleontologist

David L. Clark is a paleontologist. He was the W.H. Twenhofel Professor of Geology and Geophysics at the University of Wisconsin–Madison, Madison, Wisconsin.

In 1972, he described the conodont genus Neostreptognathodus.

== Awards and tributes ==
In 2001, he received the Raymond C. Moore Medal which the Society awards for Sedimentary Geology to persons who have made significant contributions in the field that have promoted the science of stratigraphy through research in paleontology.

The conodont genus name Clarkina and species name Streptognathodus clarki are tributes to David Leigh Clark.

== Works ==
- Conodonts and Zonation of the Upper Devonian in the Great Basin. David Leigh Clark and Raymond Lindsay Ethington
- Conodont Biofacies and Provincialism. David Leigh Clark, 1984 (link to book)
- Heteromorph Ammonoids from the Albian and Cenomanian of Texas and Adjacent Areas. David Leigh Clark
- Fossils, Paleontology, and Evolution. David Leigh, Clark
