= Carniodus =

Carniodus Temporal range: Silurian

Scientific classification
- Kingdom: Animalia
- Phylum: Chordata
- Infraphylum: Agnatha
- Class: †Conodonta
- Order: †Ozarkodinida
- Family: †Pterospathodontidae
- Genus: †Carniodus; Walliser 1964

Species
- †Carniodus carinthiacus Walliser 1964; †Carniodus carnicus Walliser 1964; †Carniodus carnulus Walliser 1964; †Carniodus eocarnicus Walliser 1964

Genus of jawless fishes

Carniodus is a conodont genus from the Silurian.
