= Distomodus =

Distomodus Temporal range: Silurian

Scientific classification
- Kingdom: Animalia
- Phylum: Chordata
- Infraphylum: Agnatha
- Class: †Conodonta
- Family: †Distomodontidae
- Genus: †Distomodus; Branson and Branson, 1947

Type species
- †Distomodus kentuckyensis Branson and Branson

Species
- †Distomodus combinatus; †Distomodus kentuckyensis; †Distomodus staurognathoides (Walliser, 1964) (syn. Johnognathus huddlei Mashkova, 1977)

Genus of chordates (fossil)

Distomodus is an extinct genus of conodonts.
