= Pterospathodus =

Pterospathodus Temporal range: Telychian–Sheinwoodian

Scientific classification
- Kingdom: Animalia
- Phylum: Chordata
- Infraphylum: Agnatha
- Class: †Conodonta
- Order: †Ozarkodinida
- Family: †Pterospathodontidae
- Genus: †Pterospathodus; Walliser 1964

Species and subspecies
- †Pterospathodus celloni; †Pterospathodus eopennatus; †P. eopennatus ssp. n. 1; †P. eopennatus ssp. n. 2; †Pterospathodus amorphognathoides; †P. amorphognathoides angulatus; †P. amorphognathoides lennarti; †P. amorphognathoides lithuanicus

Extinct genus of jawless fishes

Pterospathodus is an extinct genus of conodont from the Silurian period.

== Use in stratigraphy ==
The Telychian (Late Llandovery) of Estonia can be defined by five conodont zones (Pterospathodus eopennatus ssp. n. 1, P. eopennatus ssp. n. 2, P. amorphognathoides angulatus, P. a. lennarti and P. a. lithuanicus).

The Sheinwoodian (Wenlock) is defined between the acritarch biozone 5 and the last appearance of Pterospathodus amorphognathoides. The global boundary stratotype point is in Hughley Brook in Apedale, U.K.
