= Spathognathodus =

Spathognathodus Temporal range: Pennsylvanian

Scientific classification
- Kingdom: Animalia
- Phylum: Chordata
- Infraphylum: Agnatha
- Class: †Conodonta
- Order: †Ozarkodinida
- Family: †Spathognathodontidae
- Genus: †Spathognathodus; Branson & Mehl, 1941

Species
- †Spathognathodus coloradoensis; †Spathognathodus cristulus; †Spathognathodus ellisoni; †Spathognathodus minutus; †Spathognathodus ohioensis; †Spathognathodus orphanus; †Spathognathodus whitei

Synonyms
- Spathodus Branson and Mehl, 1933 (preoccupied by Spathodus Boulenger, 1900)

Extinct genus of jawless fishes

Spathognathodus is an extinct conodont genus in the family Spathognathodontidae. It is a non-Platform conodont, from the Pennsylvanian (Carboniferous).
