= Acodus =

Acodus Temporal range: Ordovician-Devonian ~498–388 Ma

Scientific classification
- Kingdom: Animalia
- Phylum: Chordata
- Class: †Conodonta
- Genus: †Acodus Pander, 1856

Species
- †A. campanula Mound; †A. deltatus Lindström, 1955; †A. firmus Viira, 1970; †A. primitivus Zeballo and Albanesi, 2013; †A. tripterolobus Mound; †A. zeballus Voldman et al, 2016

Extinct genus of jawless fishes

Acodus is an extinct genus of conodonts.

== Species ==
- A. acutus
- A. campanula
- A. crassus
- A. delicatus
- A. deltatus
- A. erectus
- A. firmus
- A. jonesi
- A. kechikaensis
- A. neodeltatus
- A. oneotensis
- A. planus
- A. primitivus
- A. sigmoideus
- A. similaris
- A. tripterolobus
- A. zeballus

== Distribution ==
Fossils of Acodus have been found in Argentina, Canada (Ontario, Quebec, British Columbia, Northwest Territories, Nunavut), China, Colombia (Tarqui, Huila), the Czech Republic, Estonia, Iran, Kazakhstan, Malaysia, the Russian Federation, Spain, Sweden, Thailand, the United Kingdom, and the United States (Indiana, New York, Tennessee, Nevada, Kentucky, Missouri, Ohio, Utah).
