= Ozarkodina =

Scientific classification
- Kingdom: Animalia
- Phylum: Chordata
- Infraphylum: Agnatha
- Class: †Conodonta
- Order: †Ozarkodinida
- Family: †Spathognathodontidae
- Genus: †Ozarkodina; Branson and Mehl 1933

Species
- †Ozarkodina anika; †Ozarkodina confluens; †Ozarkodina derenjalensis; †Ozarkodina eberleini; †Ozarkodina hassi; †Ozarkodina maroccanica; †Ozarkodina snajdri; †Ozarkodina soegina; †Ozarkodina typica

Extinct genus of jawless fishes

Ozarkodina is an extinct genus of conodonts in the family Spathognathodontidae.

== Use in stratigraphy ==
Ozarkodina snajdri forms a subdivision of the Pseudomonoclimacis latilobus graptolite zone in the Burgsvik beds Silurian formation in Sweden. An Ozarkodina snajdri crispa zone has also been identified in the Wills Creek in Virginia.

Ozarkodina derenjalensis is found in the Silurian of the Niur Formation in Iran.

The Kellwasser event in the Devonian which saw the extinction of all Ozarkodina species is reported in the list of Global Boundary Stratotype Sections and Points.
