= Prioniodinida =

Scientific classification
- Kingdom: Animalia
- Phylum: Chordata
- Infraphylum: Agnatha
- Class: †Conodonta
- Order: †Prioniodinida; Sweet, 1988

Families
- †Bactrognathidae; †Chirognathidae; †Ellisoniidae; †Gondolellidae; †Prioniodinidae

Synonyms
- Priodontina

Extinct order of conodonts

Prioniodinida is an extinct order of conodonts, a jawless vertebrate.

== Families ==
Families are:

- †Bactrognathidae
- †Chirognathidae
- †Ellisoniidae
- †Gondolellidae
- †Prioniodinidae
