= Conodont biostratigraphy =

Use of a particular fossil class to identify stratigraphy

Conodonts are an extinct class of animals whose feeding apparatuses called teeth or elements are common microfossils found in strata dating from the Stage 10 of the Furongian, the fourth and final series of the Cambrian, to the Rhaetian stage of the Late Triassic. These elements can be used alternatively to or in correlation with other types of fossils (graptolites, trilobites, ammonites, ...) in the subfield of the stratigraphy named biostratigraphy.

== Paleozoic conodonts ==
=== Cambrian conodonts ===
It has been suggested that Eoconodontus notchpeakensis can be a marker of Stage 10, the final stage of the Cambrian.

In 2006, a working group proposed the first appearance of Cordylodus andresi. Currently the first appearance of E. notchpeakensis is favored by many authors because it is globally widespread and is independent of facies (known from continental rise to peritidal environments).

The Eoconodontus notchpeakensis proposal would also incorporate a non-biostratigraphic marker to correlate the beginning of Stage 10 globally. A carbon isotope excursion (the HERB-event) occurs in the lower part of the E. notchpeakensis range.

Approximate protoconodont / paraconodont / euconodont zones of the Cambrian Period
Series / Epoch	Age /Stage	South China	Western North America	Australia
Furongian	"Stage 10"	upper Cordylodus lindstromi	Cordylodus lindstromi sensu lato (upper sz)	Cordylodus lindstromi (in part)
Furongian	"Stage 10"	lower Cordylodus lindstromi	Cordylodus lindstromi sensu lato (lower sz)	Cordylodus prolindstromi
Furongian	"Stage 10"	Cordylodus intermedius	Cordylodus intermedius (Clavohamulus hintzei sz)	Hirsutodontus simplex (Clavohamulus hintzei sz)
Furongian	"Stage 10"	Cordylodus intermedius	Cordylodus intermedius (Hirsutodontus simplex sz)	Hirsutodontus simplex (Hirsutodontus simplex sz)
Furongian	"Stage 10"	Cordylodus proavus	Cordylodus proavus (Clavohamulus elongatus sz)	Cordylodus proavus (Clavohamulus elongatus sz)
Furongian	"Stage 10"	Cordylodus proavus	Cordylodus proavus (Fryxellodontus inornatus sz)	Cordylodus proavus (Fryxellodontus inornatus sz)
Furongian	"Stage 10"	Cordylodus proavus	Cordylodus proavus (Hirsutodontus hirsutus sz)	Cordylodus proavus (Hirsutodontus hirsutus sz)
Furongian	"Stage 10"	Eoconodontus	Eoconodontus (Cambrooistodus minutus sz)	Hispidodontus discretus
Furongian	"Stage 10"	Eoconodontus	Eoconodontus (Cambrooistodus minutus sz)	Hispidodontus appressus
Furongian	"Stage 10"	Eoconodontus	Eoconodontus (Eoconodontus notchpeakensis sz)	Hispidodontus resimus
Furongian	(debated)	Proconodontus	Proconodontus muelleri	Teridontus nakamurai
Furongian	(debated)	Proconodontus	Proconodontus posterocostatus	Teridontus nakamurai
Furongian	Jiangshanian	Proconodontus tenuiserratus	Proconodontus tenuiserratus	
Furongian	Jiangshanian	Westergaardodina cf. calix - Prooneotodus rotundatus		
Furongian	Paibian	Westergaardodina lui - Westergaardodina ani		
Miaolingian	Guzhangian	Westergaardodina matsushitai - Westergaardodina grandidens		
Miaolingian	Guzhangian	Westergaardodina quadrata		
Miaolingian	Guzhangian	Shandongodus priscus - Hunanognathus tricuspidatus		
Miaolingian	Drumian	Gapparodus bisulcatus - Westergaardodina brevidens		
Miaolingian	Wuliuan			
Series 2	"Stage 4"			
Series 2	"Stage 3"			
Terreneuvian	"Stage 2"			
Terreneuvian	Fortunian			

=== Ordovician conodonts ===
==== Early Ordovician ====
The base of the Tremadocian, the lowest stage of Ordovician, is defined as the first appearance of Iapetognathus fluctivagus at the GSSP section in Newfoundland.

No conodont species is associated with the Floian, the second stage of the Ordovician.

==== Middle Ordovician ====
The base of the Dapingian, the third stage of the Ordovician, is defined as the first appearance of Baltoniodus triangularis.

The base of the Darriwilian, the fourth stage of the Ordovician, lies just above the North Atlantic Microzarkodina parva conodont zone. The base also lies in the upper part of the North American Histiodella altifrons conodont zone.

The Whiterock Stage refers mainly to the early Middle Ordovician in North America. It is often used in the older literature in a global sense. The Whiterock Stage is given a range from 471.8 (ca. 472) to 462 m.y.a., spanning close to 10 million years. Officially its start is defined by the potentially lowest occurrence of the conodont Protoprioniodus aranda or Baltoniodus triangularis.

==== Late Ordovician ====
No conodont species is associated with the Sandbian, the Katian, nor with the Hirnantian, the fifth, sixth and seventh and final stages of the Ordovician.

Baltoniodus gerdae has been found in the early Sandbian Bromide Formation, in Oklahoma, United States.

=== Silurian conodonts ===
==== Llandovery ====
The Llandovery epoch lasted from 443.8 ± 1.5 to 433.4 ± 2.8 mya, and is subdivided into three stages: the Rhuddanian, lasting until 440.8 million years ago, the Aeronian, lasting to 438.5 million years ago, and the Telychian.

The Telychian (Late Llandovery) of Estonia can be defined by five conodont zones (Pterospathodus eopennatus ssp. n. 1, P. eopennatus ssp. n. 2, P. amorphognathoides angulatus, P. a. lennarti and P. a. lithuanicus).

==== Wenlock ====
The Wenlock, which lasted from 433.4 ± 1.5 to 427.4 ± 2.8 mya, is subdivided into the Sheinwoodian (to 430.5 million years ago) and Homerian ages.

The Sheinwoodian (Wenlock) is defined between the acritarch biozone 5 and the last appearance of Pterospathodus amorphognathoides. The global boundary stratotype point is in Hughley Brook in Apedale, U.K.

==== Ludlow ====
The Ludlow, lasting from 427.4 ± 1.5 to 423 ± 2.8 mya, comprises the Gorstian stage, lasting until 425.6 million years ago, and the Ludfordian stage.

=== Devonian conodonts ===
==== Early Devonian ====
The Early Devonian lasts from 419.2 ± 2.8 to 393.3 ± 2.5 and begins with the Lochkovian stage, which lasts until the Pragian. This spans from 410.8 ± 2.8 to 407.6 ± 2.5, and is followed by the Emsian, which lasts until the Middle Devonian begins, 393.3± 2.7 million years ago.

==== Middle Devonian ====
The Middle Devonian comprises two subdivisions, the Eifelian giving way to the Givetian 387.7± 2.7 million years ago.

==== Late Devonian ====
Finally, the Late Devonian starts with the Frasnian, 382.7 ± 2.8 to 372.2 ± 2.5, followed by the Famennian subdivision, the beginning and end of which are marked with extinction events. This lasted until the end of the Devonian, 358.9± 2.5 million years ago. During that stage, a biologic event occurred (Upper Kellwasser Extinction of all Ancyrodella and Ozarkodina and most Palmatolepis, Polygnathus and Ancyrognathus). The Famennian (372.2 ± 1.6 mya) is defined by a GSSP Golden Spike located at Coumiac quarry, Montagne Noire, France where there is a biologic abundant occurrence of Palmatolepis triangularis.

=== Carboniferous conodonts ===
==== Mississippian (also known as Lower Carboniferous) ====
The Tournaisian, the oldest age of the Mississippian contains eight conodont biozones:

- the zone of Gnathodus pseudosemiglaber and Scaliognathus anchoralis
- the zone of Gnathodus semiglaber and Polygnathus communis
- the zone of Dollymae bouckaerti
- the zone of Gnathodus typicus and Siphonodella isosticha
- the zone of Siphonodella quadruplicata and Patrognathus andersoni (upper zone of Patrognathus andersoni)
- the lower zone of Patrognathus andersoni
- the zone of Patrognathus variabilis
- the zone of Patrognathus crassus

The Visean, the second age of the Mississippian, contains four conodont biozones:

- the zone of Lochriea nodosa
- the zone of Lochriea mononodosa
- the zone of Gnathodus bilineatus
- the zone of Gnathodus texanus

The Serpukhovian, the third or youngest age of the Mississippian, includes four conodont biozones:

- the zone of Gnathodus postbilineatus
- the zone of Gnathodus bollandensis
- the zone of Lochriea cruciformis
- the zone of Lochriea ziegleri

==== Pennsylvanian (also known as Upper Carboniferous) ====
The Bashkirian, the oldest age of the Pennsylvanian, contains six biozones based on conodont index fossils:

- the zone of Neognathodus atokaensis
- the zone of Declinognathodus marginodosus
- the zone of Idiognathodus sinuosus
- the zone of Neognathodus askynensis
- the zone of Idiognathoides sinuatus
- the zone of Declinognathodus noduliferus

The base of the Moscovian, the second stage in the Pennsylvanian, is close to the first appearances of the conodonts Declinognathodus donetzianus and Idiognathoides postsulcatus. A proposal is to use the first appearance of the conodont Diplognathodus ellesmerensis, but since the species is rare and its evolution relatively unknown, it has not been accepted yet. The Moscovian can biostratigraphically be divided into five conodont biozones:

- the zone of Neognathodus roundyi and Streptognathodus cancellosus
- the zone of Neognathodus medexultimus and Streptognathodus concinnus
- the zone of Streptognathodus dissectus
- the zone of Neognathodus uralicus
- the zone of Declinognathodus donetzianus

The top of the Kasimovian, the third stage in the Pennsylvanian, is close to the first appearance of the conodont Streptognathodus zethus. The Kasimovian is subdivided into three conodont biozones:

- the zone of Idiognathodus toretzianus
- the zone of Idiognathodus sagittatus
- the zone of Streptognathodus excelsus and Streptognathodus makhlinae

The base of the Gzhelian, the youngest age of the Pennsylvanian, is at the first appearance of Streptognathodus zethus. The top of the stage (the base of the Permian system) is at the first appearance of Streptognathodus isolatus within the Streptognathus "wabaunsensis" chronocline. The Gzhelian stage is subdivided into five biozones, based on the conodont genus Streptognathodus:

- the zone of Streptognathodus wabaunsensis and Streptognathodus bellus
- the zone of Streptognathodus simplex
- the zone of Streptognathodus virgilicus
- the zone of Streptognathodus vitali
- the zone of Streptognathodus simulator

=== Permian conodonts ===
==== Cisuralian ====
The base of the Asselian stage is at the same time the base of the Cisuralian series and the Permian system. It is defined as the place in the stratigraphic record where fossils of Streptognathodus isolatus first appear. The top of the Asselian stage (the base of the Sakmarian stage) is at the first appearance of conodont species Streptognathodus postfusus. The Asselian contains five conodont biozones:

- the zone of Streptognathodus barskovi
- the zone of Streptognathodus postfusus
- the zone of Streptognathodus fusus
- the zone of Streptognathodus constrictus
- the zone of Streptognathodus isolatus

The base of the Sakmarian stage is laid with the first appearance of Streptognathodus postfusus in the fossil record. The top of the Sakmarian (the base of the Artinskian) is defined as the place in the stratigraphic record where fossils of Sweetognathus whitei and Mesogondolella bisselli first appear.

The base of the Artinskian stage is defined as the place in the stratigraphic record where fossils of Sweetognathus whitei and Mesogondolella bisselli first appear. The top of the Artinskian (the base of the Kungurian) is defined as the place in the stratigraphic record where fossils of Neostreptognathodus pnevi and Neostreptognathodus exculptus first appear.

The base of the Kungurian stage is defined as the place in the stratigraphic record where fossils of Neostreptognathodus pnevi and Neostreptognathodus exculptus first appear. The top of the Kungurian (the base of the Roadian and the Guadalupian series) is defined as the place in the stratigraphic record where fossils of Jinogondolella nanginkensis first appear. The Kungurian contains three conodont biozones:

- the zone of Neostreptognathodus sulcoplicatus
- the zone of Neostreptognathodus prayi
- the zone of Neostreptognathodus pnevi

==== Guadalupian ====
The base of the Roadian is defined as the place in the stratigraphic record where fossils of Jinogondolella nankingensis first appears. The top of the Roadian (the base of the Wordian stage) is at the first appearance of fossils of Jinogondolella aserrata.

The base of the Wordian stage is defined as the place in the stratigraphic record where fossils of Jinogondolella aserrata first appear. The top of the Wordian (the base of the Capitanian stage) is defined as the place in the stratigraphic record where Jinogondolella postserrata first appears.

The base of the Capitanian stage is defined as the place in the stratigraphic record where fossils of Jinogondolella postserrata first appear. The top of the Capitanian (the base of the Wuchiapingian and Lopingian series) is defined as the place in the stratigraphic record where Clarkina postbitteri postbitteri first appears. The Capitanian contains three conodont biozones:

- the zone of Clarkina postbitteri hongshuiensis
- the zone of Jinogondolella altudaensis
- the zone of Jinogondolella postserrata

==== Lopingian ====
The base of the Wuchiapingian stage is defined as the place in the stratigraphic record where Clarkina postbitteri postbitteri first appears. The top of the Wuchiapingian (the base of the Changhsingian) is at the first appearance of conodont species Clarkina wangi.

The base of the Changhsingian stage is at the first appearance of Clarkina wangi. The top of the Changhsingian (the base of the Induan stage and the Triassic system) is at the first appearance of Hindeodus parvus.

== Mesozoic conodonts ==
=== Early Triassic ===
The base of the Induan stage (which is also the base of the Lower Triassic series, the base of the Triassic system and the base of the Mesozoic erathem) is defined as the place in the fossil record where Hindeodus parvus first appears.

The base of the Olenekian is at the lowest occurrence of Neospathodus waageni. It is defined as ending near the lowest occurrences of Chiosella timorensis.

=== Middle Triassic ===
The base of the Anisian stage (also the base of the Middle Triassic series) is sometimes laid at the first appearance of Chiosella timorensis in the stratigraphic record. The top of the Anisian (the base of the Ladinian) is at the first appearance of Neogondolella praehungarica.

The Ladinian is defined by the first appearance of Budurovignathus praehungaricus.

=== Upper Triassic ===
The top of the Carnian (the base of the Norian) is at the conodont biozones of Metapolygnathus communisti or Metapolygnathus primitius.

The Norian stage begins at the base of the conodont biozones of Metapolygnathus communisti and Metapolygnathus primitius. The top of the Norian (the base of the Rhaetian) is close to the first appearance of Misikella spp. and Epigondolella mosheri.

The Alaunian, also known as "Middle Norian", is a sub-age in the Upper Triassic. It begins with the first appearance of Cypridodella multidentata. The stage ends with the first appearance of Cypridodella bidentata.
