= Iapetognathus =

Iapetognathus Temporal range: Early Ordovician

Scientific classification
- Domain: Eukaryota
- Kingdom: Animalia
- Phylum: Chordata
- Infraphylum: Agnatha
- Class: †Conodonta
- Order: †Proconodontida
- Family: †Cordylodontidae
- Genus: †Iapetognathus; Landing

Species
- †Iapetognathus fluctivagus; †Iapetonudus ibexensis; †Iapetognathus preaengensis

Genus of jawless fishes

Iapetognathus is a genus of cordylodan conodonts. It is one of the oldest denticulate euconodont genera known.

Like other members of the genus, Iapetognathus fluctivagus had ramiform (branching) array of elements (apparatus). It is believed that the ramiform apparatus in Iapetognathus fluctivagus evolved from the coniform (cone-like) apparatus of Iapetonudus ibexensis. It can be readily distinguished from other conodonts existing during the same age by the sideward orientation of the major teeth-like projections (denticulate processes).

The genus Iapetognathus and related denticulate groups still require extensive taxonomic clarification. In 2011, a study discovered that the First appearance datum (FAD) of Iapetognathus fluctivagus in the Global Boundary Stratotype Section and Point (GSSP) section in Green Point may not actually be the earliest species of Iapetognathus to appear as was earlier believed. Its true FAD lies above another species, Iapetognathus preaengensis, and is not present at the Cambrian–Ordovician boundary (COBWG). The authors of the study recommended a reevaluation of the Green Point GSSP section, as well as possible redefinitions of the associated horizons using other index fossils.

== See also ==
- Iapetus Ocean, an ocean that existed in the late Neoproterozoic and early Paleozoic eras of the geologic timescale (between 600 and 400 million years ago)
