= Kallidontus =

Kallidontus Temporal range: Furongian–Tremadocian

Scientific classification
- Kingdom: Animalia
- Phylum: Chordata
- Infraphylum: Agnatha
- Class: †Conodonta
- Order: †Proconodontida
- Family: †Fryxellodontidae
- Genus: †Kallidontus; Pyle and Barnes, 2002

Species
- †Kallidontus gondwanicus; †Kallidontus nodosus; †Kallidontus serratus

Extinct genus of jawless fishes

Kallidontus is an extinct genus of conodonts.

Pyle and Barnes described the genus in 2002 from the Kechika Formation, Skoki Formation, and Road River Group (Upper Cambrian to Lower Silurian), in Northeastern British Columbia, in Canada.

Kallidontus gondwanicus is from the Late Cambrian (late Furongian) or early Ordovician (Tremadocian) of the Santa Rosita Formation in the Tilcara Range, Cordillera Oriental of Jujuy, in Argentina.
