= Eoconodontus =

Eoconodontus Temporal range: Furongian

Scientific classification
- Kingdom: Animalia
- Phylum: Chordata
- Infraphylum: Agnatha
- Class: †Conodonta
- Order: †Proconodontida
- Family: †Cordylodontidae
- Genus: †Eoconodontus; Miller, 1980

Species
- †Eoconodontus altus; †Eoconodontus notchpeakensis

Extinct genus of jawless fishes

Eoconodontus is an extinct genus of conodonts of the Late Cambrian. It is a two-elements (rounded and compressed) genus from the Proconodontus lineage.

== Use in stratigraphy ==
It is suggested that Eoconodontus notchpeakensis can be a marker of the Stage 10 of the Furongian the fourth and final series of the Cambrian.

In 2006, a working group proposed the first appearance of Cordylodus andresi. Currently the first appearance of E. notchpeakensis is favored by many authors because it is globally widespread and is independent of facies (known from continental rise to peritidal environments).

The Eoconodontus notchpeakensis proposal would also incorporate a non-biostratigraphic marker to correlate the beginning of Stage 10 globally. A carbon isotope excursion (the HERB-event) occurs in the lower part of the E. notchpeakensis range.
