= Iapetognathus fluctivagus =

Iapetognathus fluctivagus Temporal range: Tremadocian

Scientific classification
- Kingdom: Animalia
- Phylum: Chordata
- Infraphylum: Agnatha
- Class: †Conodonta
- Order: †Proconodontida
- Family: †Cordylodontidae
- Genus: †Iapetognathus
- Species: †I. fluctivagus

Binomial name
- †Iapetognathus fluctivagus Nicoll, Miller, Nowlan, Repetski & Ethington, 1999

Species of jawless fish

Iapetognathus fluctivagus is a species of denticulate cordylodan conodonts belonging to the genus Iapetognathus. It existed during the Tremadocian Age (486.85 million years ago) of the Ordovician. It is an important index fossil in biostratigraphy.

== Description ==
Like other members of the genus, Iapetognathus fluctivagus had ramiform (branching) array of elements (apparatus). It is believed that the ramiform apparatus in Iapetognathus fluctivagus evolved from the coniform (cone-like) apparatus of Iapetonudus ibexensis. It can be readily distinguished from other conodonts existing during the same age by the sideward orientation of the major teeth-like projections (denticulate processes).

== Taxonomy ==
Iapetognathus fluctivagus is classified under the genus Iapetognathus. It belongs to the cordylodan family Cordylodontidae of the order Proconodontida (Cavidonti). It was first described in 1999 by paleontologists Robert S. Nicoll, James F. Miller, Godfrey S. Nowlan, John E. Repetski, and Raymond L. Ethington.

== Distribution ==
The fossils of Iapetognathus fluctivagus have been described from the Tremadocian of Utah, Nevada, Idaho, Colorado, Oklahoma, Texas, and New Mexico of the United States; western Newfoundland and British Columbia of Canada; Bartyrbay of Kazakhstan; and the Hebei province of China.

== Biostratigraphy ==
The first appearance datum (FAD) of Iapetognathus fluctivagus in the cliffs of Green Point, Newfoundland and Labrador, Canada is defined as the base of the Tremadocian Age (486.85 million years ago) and the beginning of the Ordovician Period.

However, the genus Iapetognathus and related denticulate groups still require extensive taxonomic clarification. In 2011, a study discovered that the FAD of Iapetognathus fluctivagus in the GSSP section in Green Point may not actually be the earliest species of Iapetognathus to appear as was earlier believed. Its true FAD lies above another species, Iapetognathus preaengensis, and is not present at the Cambrian–Ordovician boundary (COBWG). The authors of the study recommended a reevaluation of the Green Point GSSP section, as well as possible redefinitions of the associated horizons using other index fossils.

== See also ==
- Cambrian–Ordovician extinction event
- Great Ordovician Biodiversification Event
