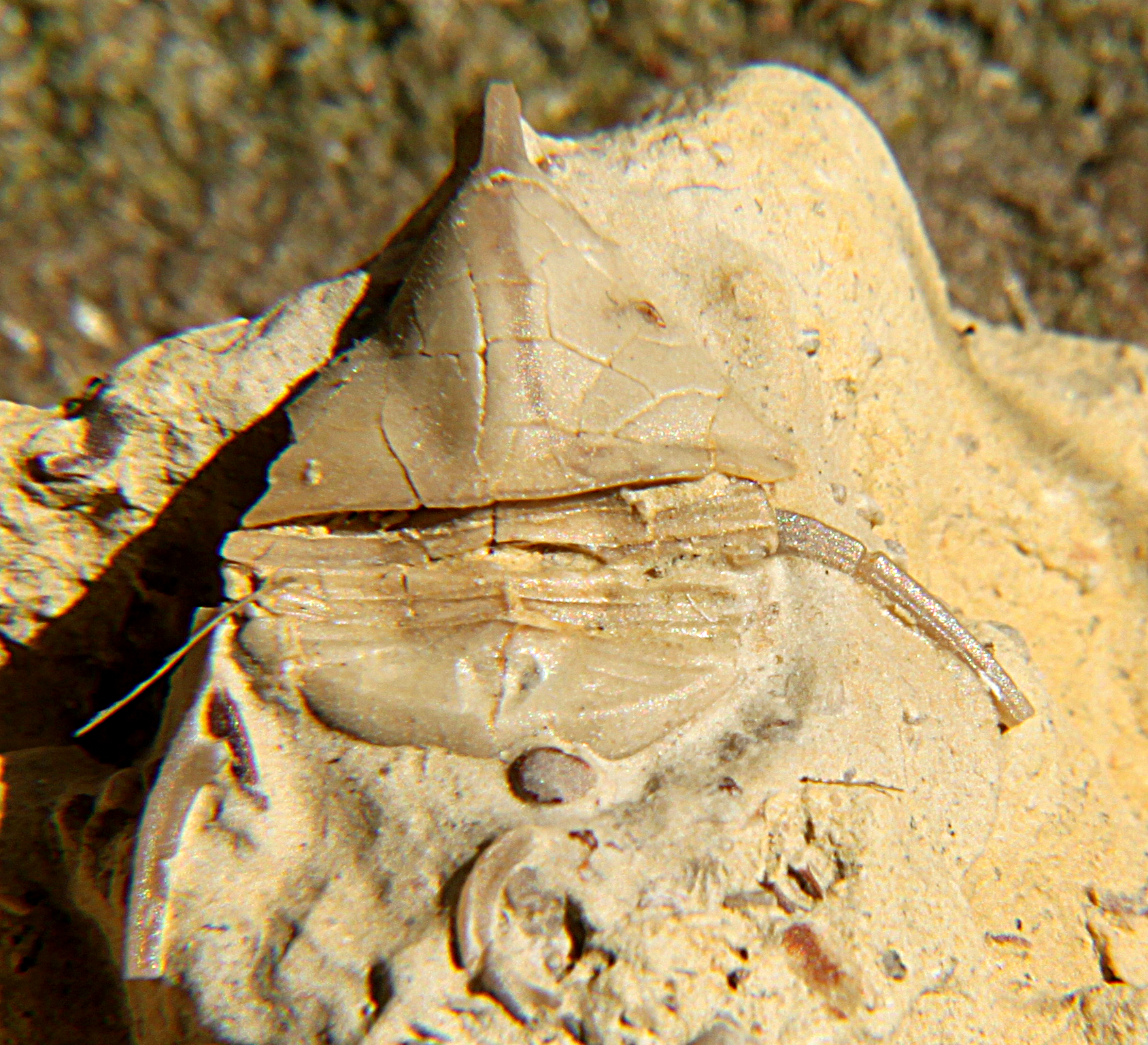
- L. mcgeheei, Bromide Formation, Oklahoma

Scientific classification
- Kingdom: Animalia
- Phylum: Arthropoda
- Clade: †Artiopoda
- Class: †Trilobita
- Order: †Asaphida
- Family: †Raphiophoridae
- Genus: †Lonchodomas; Angelin, 1854

Type species
- Ampyx rostrata

Species
- L. rostratus (Sars, 1835); L. carinatus Cooper, 1953; L. clavulus Whittington, 1965; L. mcgeheei (Decker, 1931) synonym Ampyx mcgeheei; L. retrolatus Ross jr. & Barnes, 1967; L. suriensis Harrington & Leanza, 1957; L. volborthi (Schmidt, 1894) synonym Ampyx volborthi

= Lonchodomas =

Lonchodomas Temporal range: Ordovician

Extinct genus of trilobites

Lonchodomas is a genus of trilobites, that lived during the Ordovician. It was eyeless, like all raphiophorids, and had a long straight sword-like frontal spine, that gradually transforms into the relatively long glabella. Both the glabellar spine and the backward directed genal spines are subquadrate in section. Lonchodomas has five thorax segments and the pleural area of the pygidium has two narrow furrows. Lonchodomas occurred in what are today Argentina, Canada (Newfoundland), Estonia, Latvia, Norway, Sweden, the Russian Federation (Leningrad Oblast) and the United States (Oklahoma, Virginia).

== Distribution ==
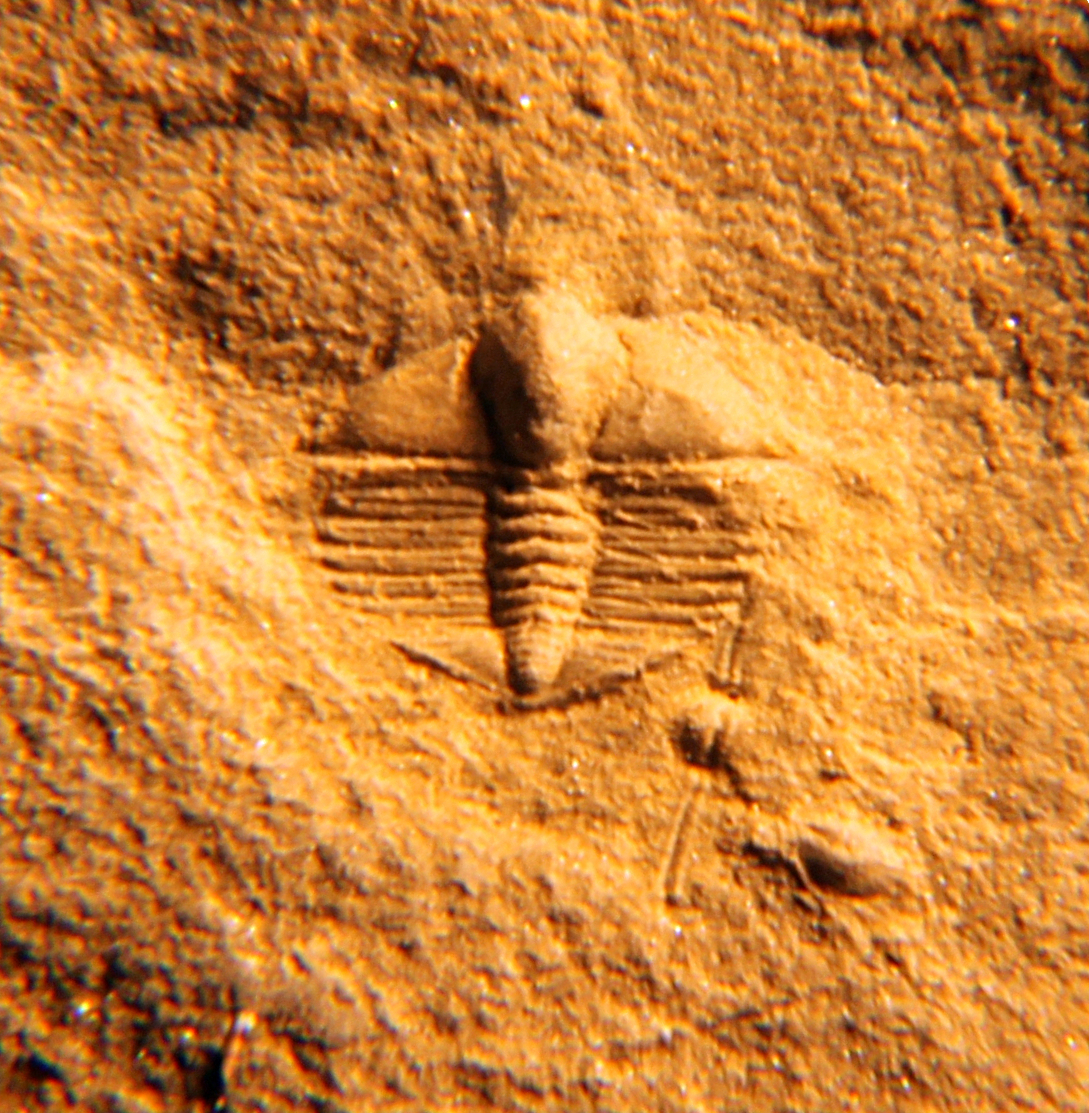
Lonchodomas suriensis, 4 mm long

- L. carinatus is found in the Upper Ordovician of the United States (Lower Member and Botetourt limestone Member, of the Edinburgh Formation, Shenandoah County, Virginia, 39.0° N, 78.4° W Blackriveran 460.9 - 449.5 Ma)
- L. clavulus is present in the Middle Ordovician of Newfoundland, Canada (Histiodella kristinae conodont zone, Table Cove Formation; Table Point, "Middle Table Head" and Table Cove).
- L. mcgeheei is present in the Upper Ordovician of Oklahoma, United States (Bromide Formation, Sandbian).
- L. retrolatus was collected from the Ordovician of Nevada (Eureka Quartzite, sandy limestone, 60–90 ft above base, Ranger Mountains, Nevada Test Site))
- L. rostratus is known from the Upper Ordovician of Estonia (Narva open pit, and Lasnamägi, Kukruse Stage, Sandbian) and Latvia (Remte 3 borehole, and Adze 6 borehole, Kukruse Stage, Sandbian).
- L. suriensis was excavated from the Middle Ordovician of Argentina (Portillo del Cajón, Cerro Morado; Cerro Suri; Puesto El Despacho; Las Pircas; all La Rioja)
- L. volborthi occurs in the Lower Ordovician of the Russian Federation (Volkhovian level, Syas River, Putilovo and Babino quarries, St.Petersburg region). It was originally described as Ampyx volborthi but assigned to Lonchodomas in 1952 by Steinar Skjeseth.

== Description ==
Like all raphiophorids, Lonchodomas is eyeless. The headshield (or cephalon) and tailshield (or pygidium) are subtriangular in outline. Lonchodomas looks a lot like Ampyx but the glabella is diamond-shaped in outline, and it has a ridge along the midline (it is carinate). The glabella gradually transforms into the spine, which makes it difficult to determine where the spine begins. The long median glabellar spine is subquadrate in section and is directed horizontally forward, from the frontal tip of the glabella. The glabella has 2 pairs of muscle scars. The genal spines are also subquadrate in section. The thorax has 5 segments. The pleural regions of pygidium have 2 pairs of narrow pleural furrows.
