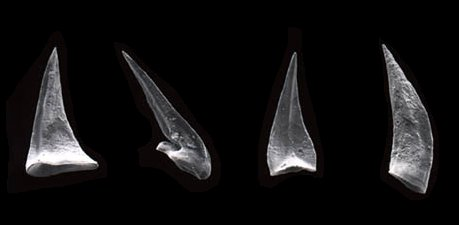

Scientific classification
- Kingdom: Animalia
- Phylum: Chordata
- Infraphylum: Agnatha
- Class: †Conodonta
- Family: †Oistodontidae
- Genus: †Histiodella; Harris, 1962

Species
- †Histiodella altifrons; †Histiodella holodentata; †Histiodella kristinae; †Histiodella wuhaiensis

= Histiodella =

Histiodella Temporal range: Middle Ordovician

Extinct genus of jawless fishes

Histiodella is an extinct genus of conodonts.

Histiodella wuhaiensis is from the Ordovician of the Lower Klimoli Formation in China.

Histiodella kristinae forms a conodont zone, in the Table Cove Formation, Table Point, "Middle Table Head" and Table Cove, in the Middle Ordovician of Newfoundland, Canada where the trilobite species Lonchodomas clavulus or Galbagnostus galba are also present.

== Use in stratigraphy ==
The base of the Darriwilian, the fourth stage of the Ordovician, lies in the upper part of the North American Histiodella altifrons conodont zone.
