= Fryxellodontidae =

Scientific classification
- Domain: Eukaryota
- Kingdom: Animalia
- Phylum: Chordata
- Infraphylum: Agnatha
- Class: †Conodonta
- Order: †Proconodontida
- Family: †Fryxellodontidae; Miller, 1981

Genera
- †Cristodus; †Dzikodus; †Fryxellodontus; †Kallidontus; †Polonodus

Extinct family of jawless fishes

Fryxellodontidae is an extinct family of conodonts in the order Proconodontida.

== Genera ==
Genera are:

- †Cristodus
- †Dzikodus
- †Fryxellodontus
- †Kallidontus
- †Polonodus
