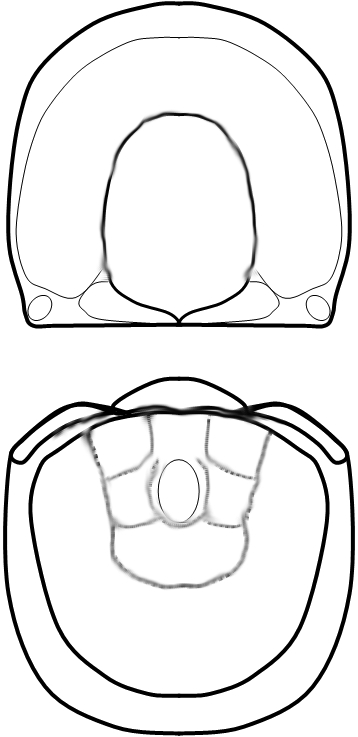
- A drawing of cephalon and pygidium of Galbagnostus galba

Scientific classification
- Kingdom: Animalia
- Phylum: Arthropoda
- Clade: †Artiopoda
- Class: †Trilobita (?)
- Order: †Agnostida
- Family: †Metagnostidae
- Genus: †Galbagnostus; Whittington, 1965

Species
- G. galba (Billings, 1865) (type), synonym Agnostus galba; G. nericiensis Ahlberg, 1992; G. obscurus Zhou, Zhou & Yin, 2016; G. valmyensis (Ross, 1958), synonym Trinodus valmyensis

= Galbagnostus =

Galbagnostus Temporal range: Floian to Darriwillian

Extinct genus of trilobites

Galbagnostus is an extinct genus of agnostid trilobites. It lived during the Lower and Middle Ordovician (Floian to Darriwillian).

== Distribution ==
- Galbagnostus galba has been found in the Middle Ordovician (Darriwillian) of Newfoundland, Canada (Histiodella kristinae conodont-zone, Table Cove Formation, Table Head Group, Chazyan) and Ireland (Lough Shee Mudrocks Formation, Llanvirn).
- G. sp. was collected from the Horn Valley Siltstone and basal Stairway Sandstone, Amadeus Basin, Northern Territory.
- G. nericiensis is reported from the late Lower Ordovician (Floian) of Sweden (Billingen stage).

== Description ==
Like all Agnostida, G. galba is diminutive and the headshield (or cephalon) and tailshield (or pygidium) are of approximately the same size (or isopygous) and outline. As in all Agnostina, G. galba has two thorax segments. When Agnostina are rolled up, a tiny opening between the cephalon and the thorax becomes visible (the cephalothoracic aperture) that uniquely distinguishes this group from the Eodiscina. A feature shared with all Agnostoidea is that the frontal lobe of the central raised area of the cephalon (or glabella) is not laterally expanded compared to the backward lobe, like in the Condylopygoidea. In G. galba the glabella is short and broad. The furrow that usually separates the anterior and posterior glabella (F3) is effaced. The lateral furrows of the posterior glabella (F2) are weakly impressed. The node on the glabella is located near its anterior margin. The pygidial axis is very short, and tapers to the back. The posterior lobe is transverse trapeziform, and carries an indistinct median ridge, and behind which the axial furrow deepens.
