= Iapetonudus =

Iapetonudus Temporal range: Early Ordovician

Scientific classification
- Kingdom: Animalia
- Phylum: Chordata
- Infraphylum: Agnatha
- Class: †Conodonta
- Order: †Proconodontida
- Genus: †Iapetonudus; Nicoll at al, 1999

Species
- †Iapetonudus ibexensis

Extinct genus of jawless fishes

Iapetonudus is an extinct genus of conodonts.

Like other members of its genus, Iapetognathus fluctivagus had ramiform (branching) array of elements (apparatus). It is believed that the ramiform apparatus in Iapetognathus fluctivagus evolved from the coniform (cone-like) apparatus of Iapetonudus ibexensis.

== See also ==
- Iapetus Ocean, an ocean that existed in the late Neoproterozoic and early Paleozoic eras of the geologic timescale (between 600 and 400 million years ago)
