= Proconodontus =

Proconodontus Temporal range: Cambrian

Scientific classification
- Kingdom: Animalia
- Phylum: Chordata
- Infraphylum: Agnatha
- Class: †Conodonta
- Order: †Proconodontida
- Family: †Proconodontidae; Lindström, 1970
- Genus: †Proconodontus; Miller, 1969

Species
- †Proconodontus carinatus; †Proconodontus gallatini; †Proconodontus muelleri; †Proconodontus notchpeakensis; †Proconodontus posterocostatus; †Proconodontus serratus; †Proconodontus tenuiserratus; †Proconodontus transitans

Extinct genus of jawless fishes

Proconodontus is an extinct genus of conodonts in the monotypic family Proconodontidae. The specimens are found in Cambrian formations.
