= Road River Group =

- Stratigraphic range: Ordovician
- Type: Group

Location
- Region: Alberta
- Country: Canada

The Road River Group is a geologic group in Alberta. It preserves fossils dating back to the Ordovician period.

== See also ==
- List of fossiliferous stratigraphic units in Alberta
