= Green Point, Newfoundland and Labrador =

Coordinates: 49°40′56″N 57°57′19″W

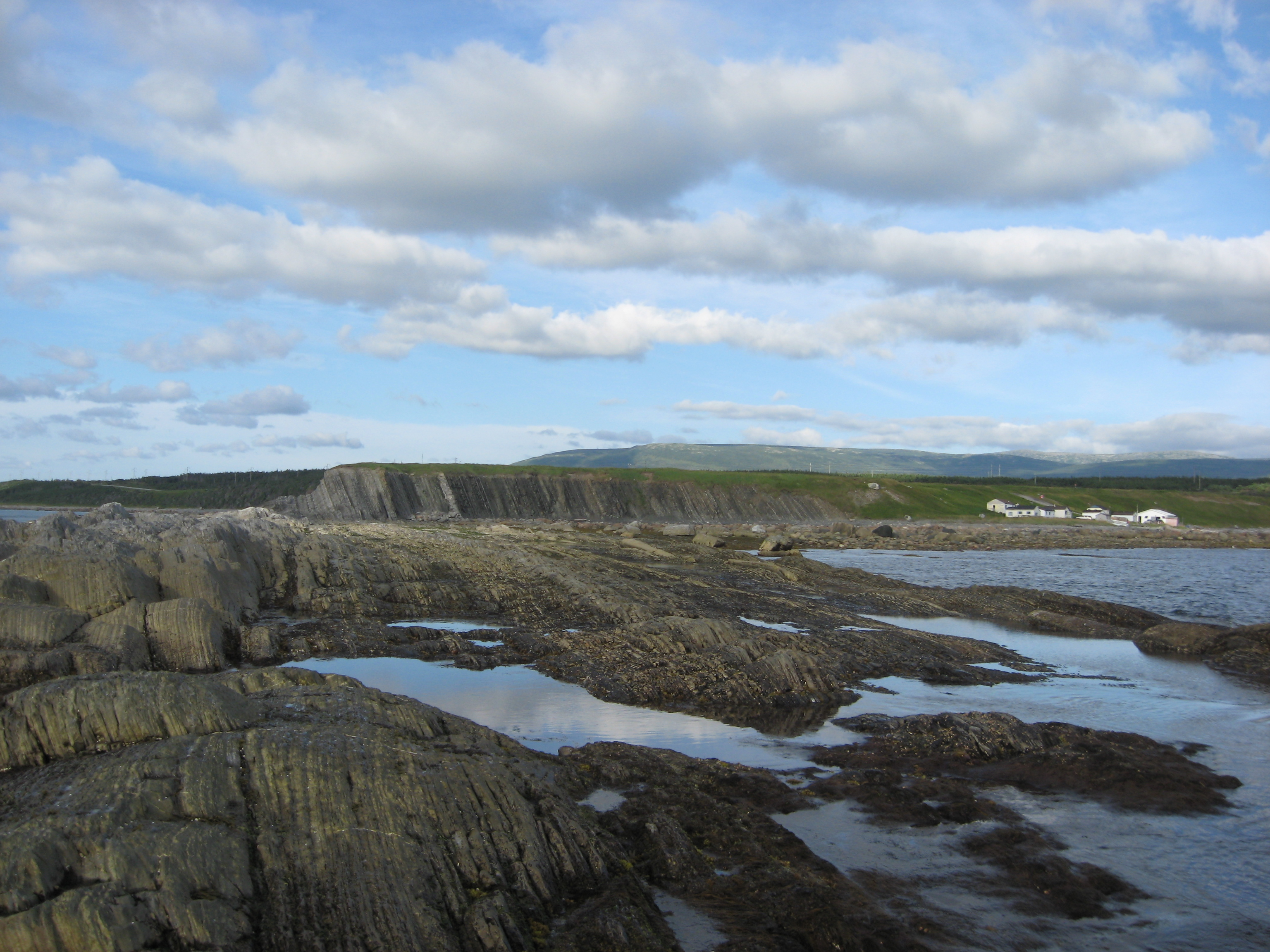
Green Point at low tide

Green Point is located 12 km north of the town of Rocky Harbour in Gros Morne National Park, on the west coast of Newfoundland. It is the home to a small summer fishing community and a drive-in campground. In 2000, Green Point was designated the Global Stratotype Section and Point (GSSP) representing the division between the Cambrian and the Ordovician systems.

== Geology ==
In 2000, the cliffs at Green Point were approved as the Global Stratotype Section and Point for the base of the Ordovician system by the International Union of Geological Sciences. The boundary is a section 60m thick composed of layers of shale and limestone with overturned beds dipping 60-70 degrees to the South East. It is marked by the first appearance of Iapetognathus fluctivagus, a conodont fossil, 4.8m below the earliest known planktic graptolite fossil, Rhabdinopora praeparabola.

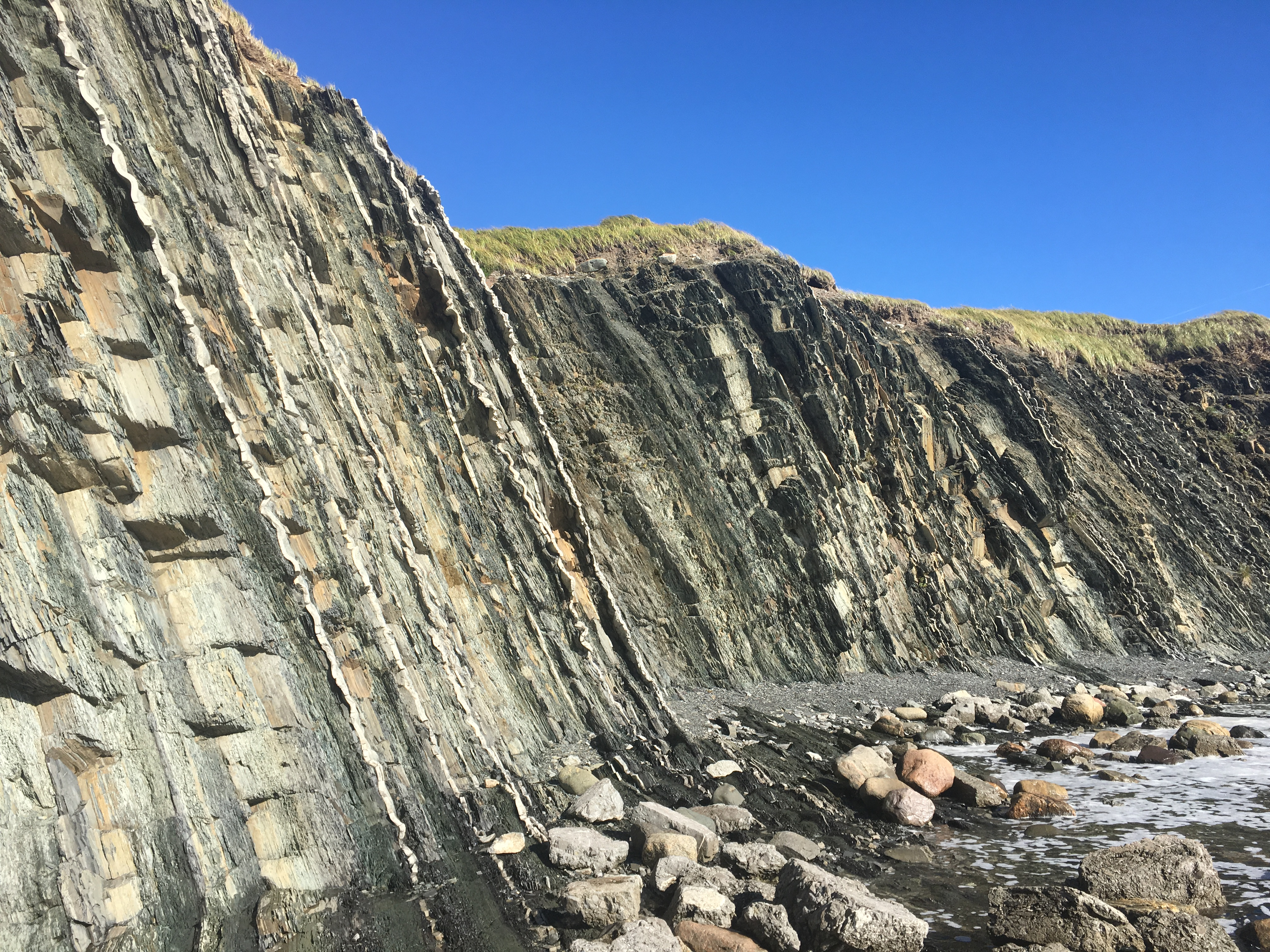
Cliffs layers viewed from the side.

The shales represent a 30 million year record of deep-ocean sediments laid in a base-of-slope environment in the Iapetus Ocean. The limestone layers indicate periodic avalanches from the shallower waters. Portions of the same limestone avalanches that came to rest further up the coastal slopes are featured at Cow Head. There, the individual rocks in the limestone conglomerate are much larger.

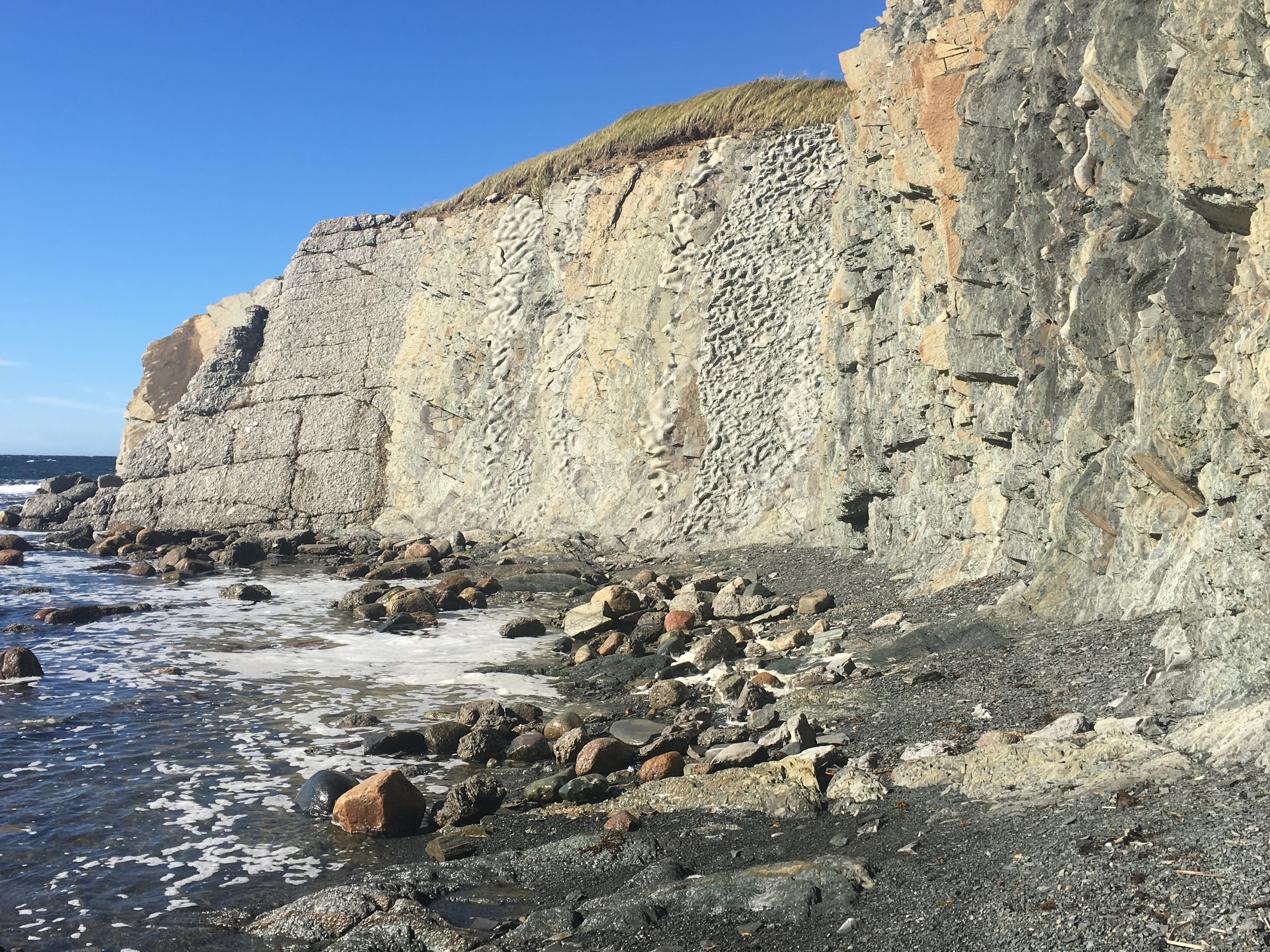
Exposed cliff layers.

== Campground ==
There are 31 drive-in campsites at Green Point.

== See also ==
- Gros Morne National Park
- List of Global Boundary Stratotype Sections and Points
