= Bromide Formation =

Geological formation in Oklahoma, U.S.

- Stratigraphic range: early Sandbian 461–458 Myo
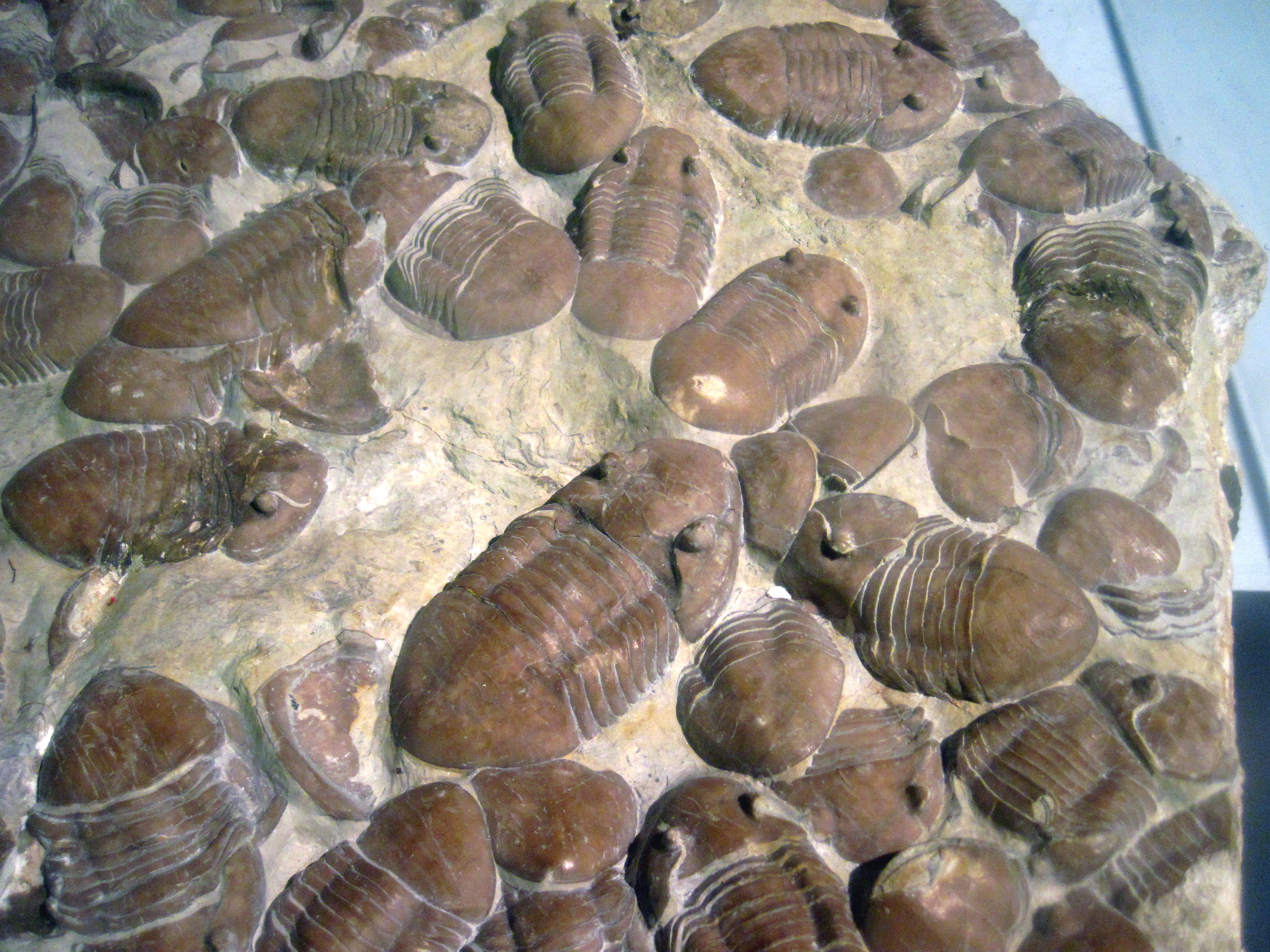
- Type: Geological formation
- Unit of: Simpson Group
- Sub-units: Mountain Lake Member, Pooleville Member
- Underlies: Viola Formation
- Overlies: Tulip Creek Formation
- Thickness: 71 meters (233 ft) Pooleville Member at type location.

Lithology
- Primary: limestone
- Other: limestone interbedded with shale, and sandstone

Location
- Coordinates: 34°00′N 97°00′W
- Region: Central-South Oklahoma: Carter County, Johnston County, Murray County and Pontotoc County
- Country: United States of America
- Extent: from Blount to Decorah

Type section
- Named by: Ulrich, 1911

The Bromide Formation is a geological formation in Oklahoma, USA. It is well known for its diverse echinoderm and trilobite fossil fauna.

== Location ==
The Bromide Formation crops out in the Arbuckle and Wichita Mountains and in the Criner Hills of Southern Oklahoma. It appears at the surface in particular within Carter, Johnston, Murray and Pontotoc counties (34.0° N, 97.0° W).

== Stratigraphy ==
The Bromide Formation is the uppermost part of the Simpson Group, and originates from the Upper Ordovician (early Sandbian). This mostly carbonate succession is divided into the Mountain Lake and overlying Pooleville members. Although it primarily consists of limestone, limestone interbedded with shale, and sandstone, also occur. The Bromide Formation is a shallow water marine sediment.

Much of the Mountain Lake Member comprises meter-scale, deep ramp cycles that overlie a lowstand systems tract of sandstones and sandy crinoidal grainstones. Cycle tops are starved surfaces with irregular, mineralized hardgrounds. The Pooleville Member consists of an early highstand interval of shallow subtidal carbonates and late highstand peritidal carbonates (Corbin Ranch Submember). Down-ramp, the Pooleville is represented largely by centimeter-thick shales and interbedded lime mudstones.

== Economic use ==
The Bromide Formation has been a source of oil and gas, with exploration slightly north of the area where the formation is exposed.

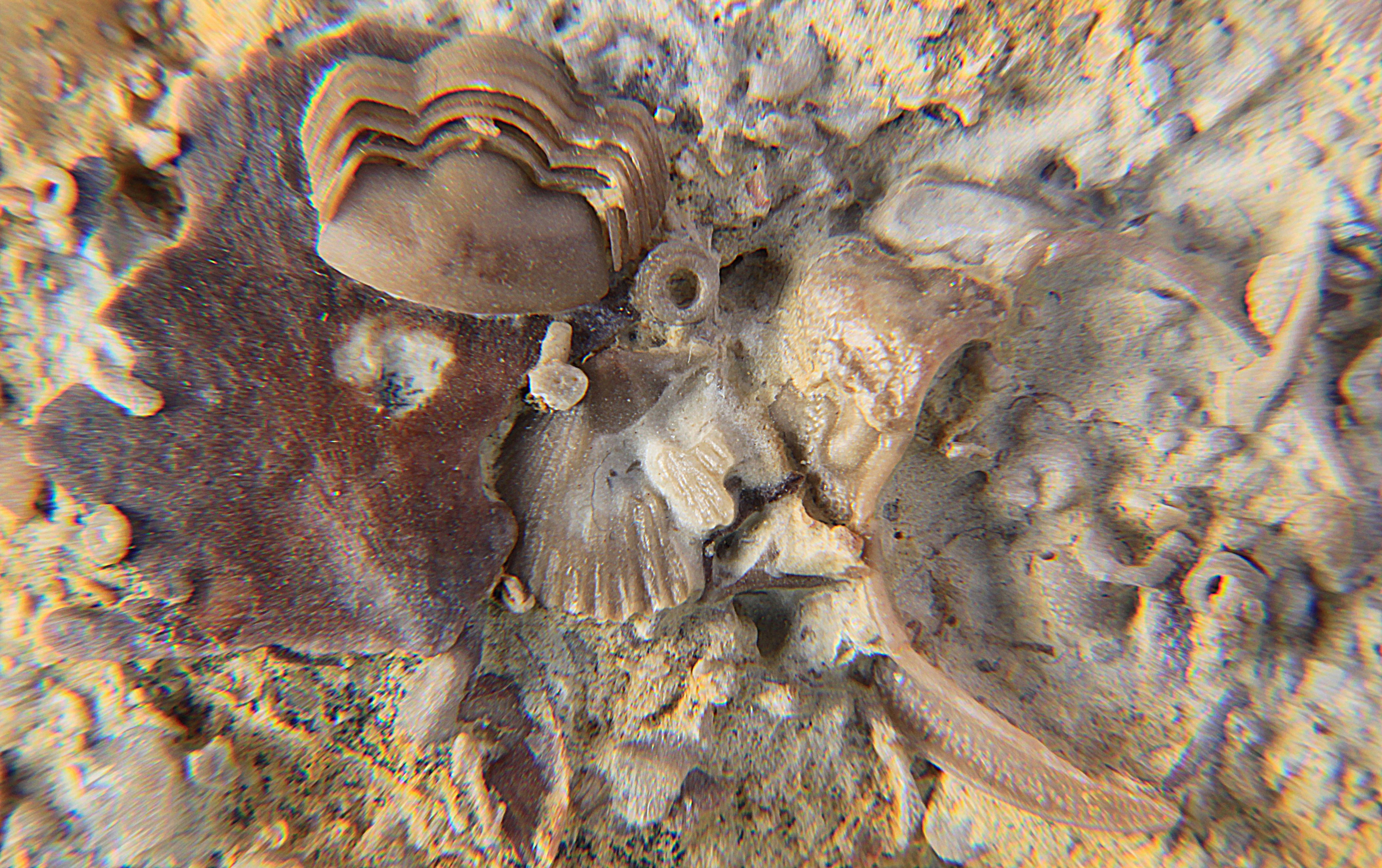
4×2½ cm of fossil sea floor, from the Bromide Formation. The dark brownish thallus to the left is the green algae Ischadites iowensis, on top of it and to the top of the picture is the pygidium and back part of the thorax of the Corynexochid trilobite Nanillaenus punctatus, to the right is the cephalon of the Harpetid trilobite Dolichoharpes reticulata

== Origin ==
The Bromide Formation was deposited in a shallow, storm-dominated epeiric sea that extended over part of the Laurentia continent, in what is today Southern Oklahoma. The sea spread into an area that sunk into a rift, that ultimately did not endure, a so-called aulacogen. Lying approximately at 30° Southern latitude, a low-land desert bordered much of the shallow sea from where well-rounded quartz sand blew in. This now represents the sandstone at the base of the Bromide Formation. Eventually, sea level rise caused by subsidence drowned the borderlands cutting off the supply of sand, and now the shales and limestones of the Middle Bromide (upper Mountain Lake Member) accumulated on a broad ramp. Gradually – primarily echinoderm – skeletons build up a carbonate shelf. Further eustatic sea level rise (transgression) cut off the supply of virtually all sediments from land, and remains of carbonate-producing organisms began filling the basin. This now forms the limestone of the upper Bromide (Pooleville Member). Finally, a drop in sea level (regression) exposed the entire platform, and became a broad, nearly featureless, hot, semi-arid sabkha.

== Fossils ==
Fossils have been found in the Bromide Formation of green algae, sponges, corals, graptolites, lampshells, moss animals, trilobites, clam shrimps, molluscs, several groups of echinoderms, and teeth of jawless fish.

=== Green algae ===
- Ischadites iowensis
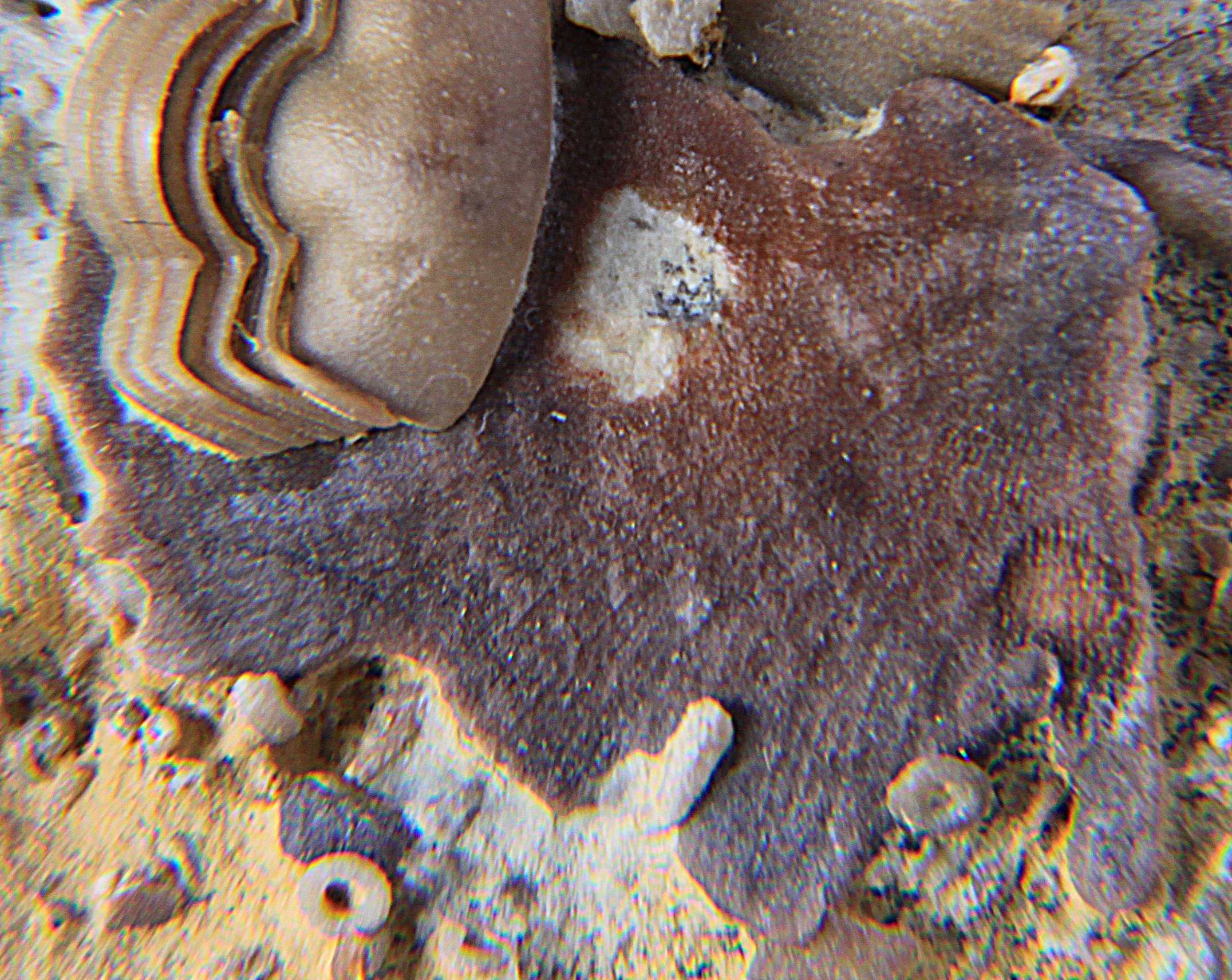
  Ischadites iowensis

=== Sponges ===
- Dierespongia palla

=== Corals ===
- Saffordophyllum deckeri
- Tetradium oklahomense
- Tetradium spicululatum

=== Graptolites ===
- Dicellograptus gurlei
- Dictyonema francesiae
- Dictyonema rockcrossingensis
- Diplograptus (Amplexograptus) maxwelli

=== Lampshells ===
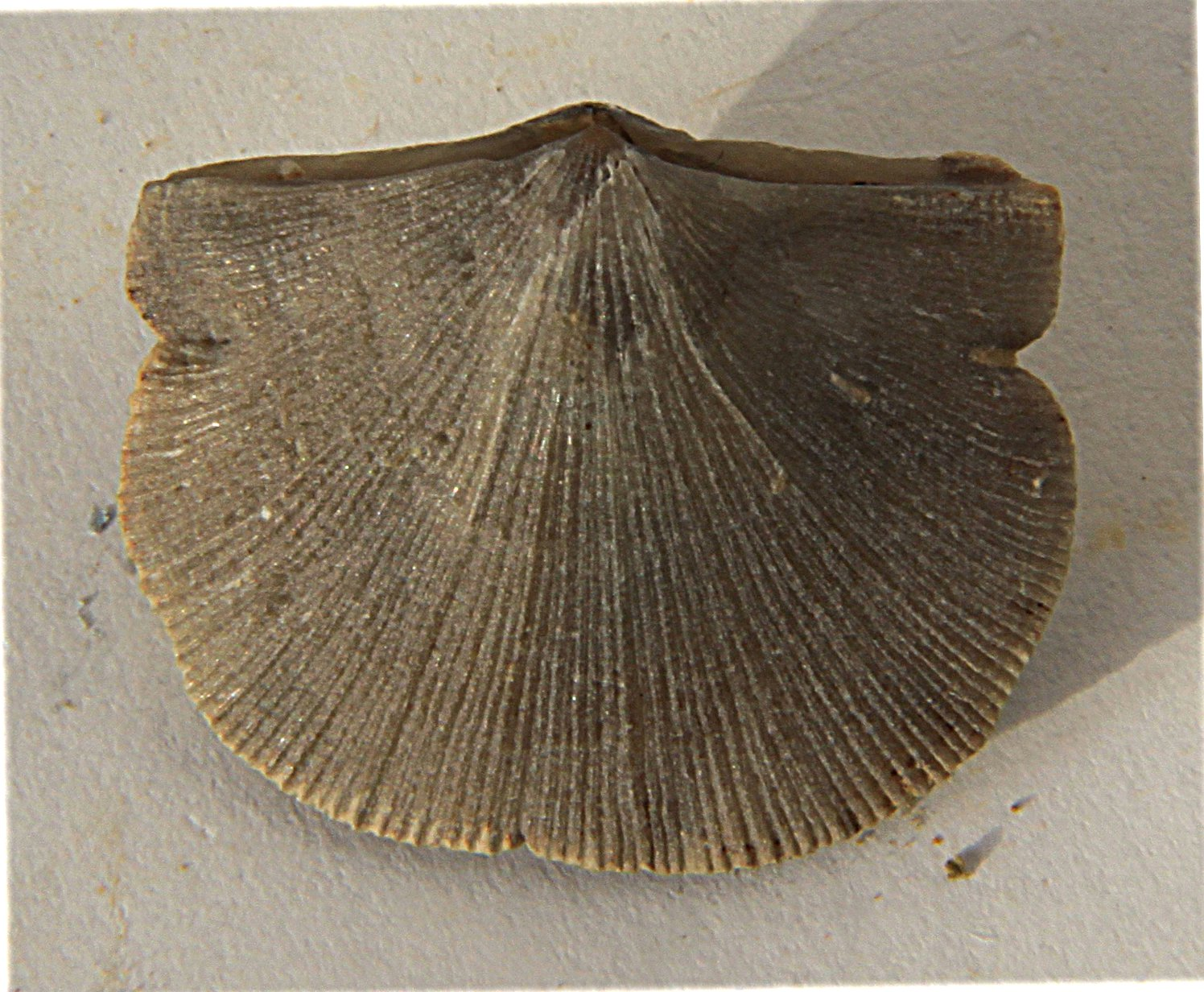
Chaulistomella magna is also known as Dinorthis subquadrata and Valcourea magna

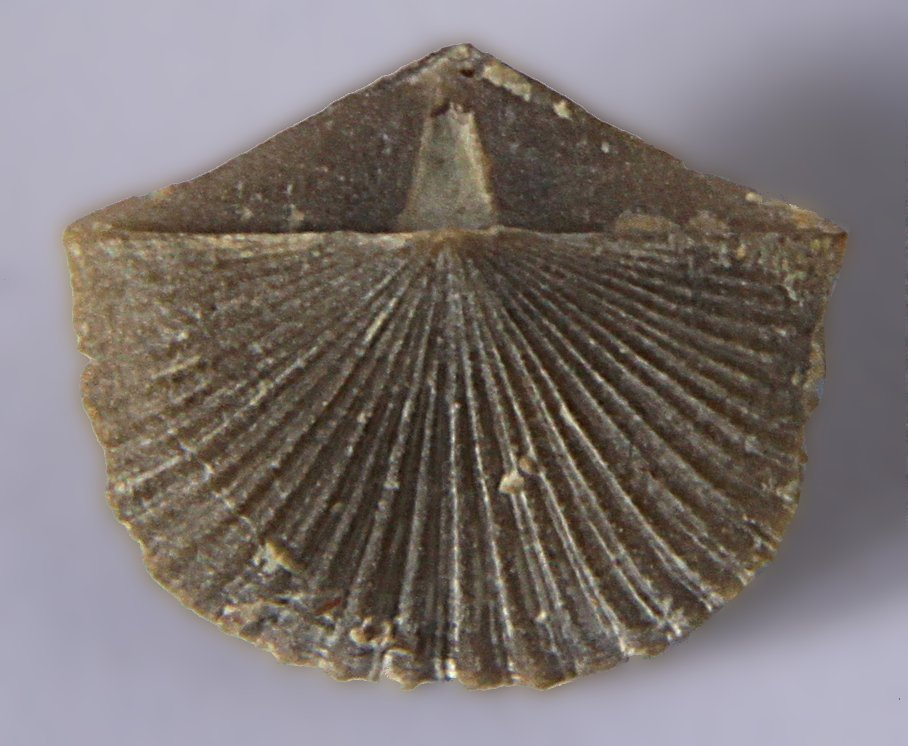
Hesperorthis sulcata

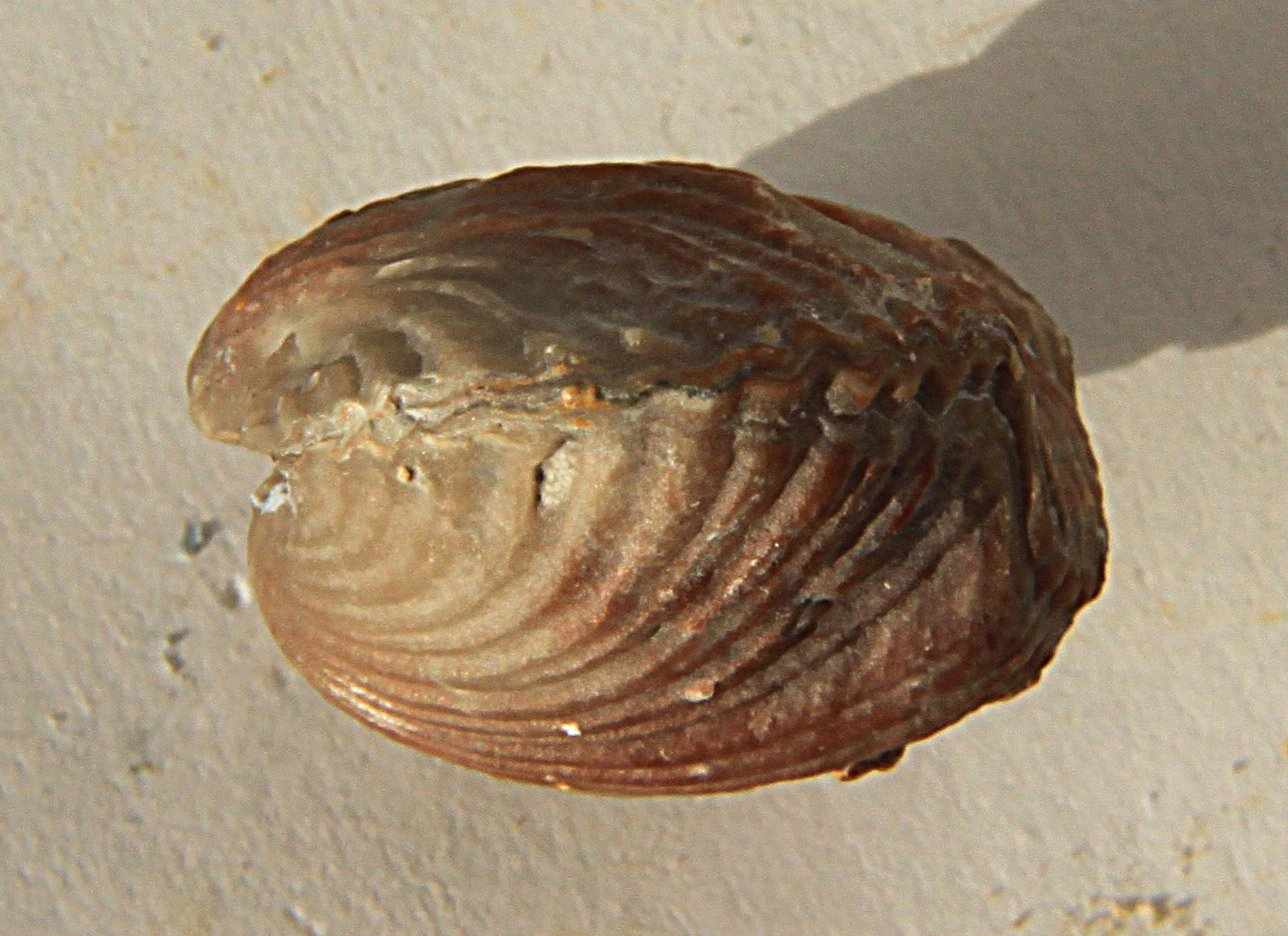
an Oxoplecia gouldi lampshell

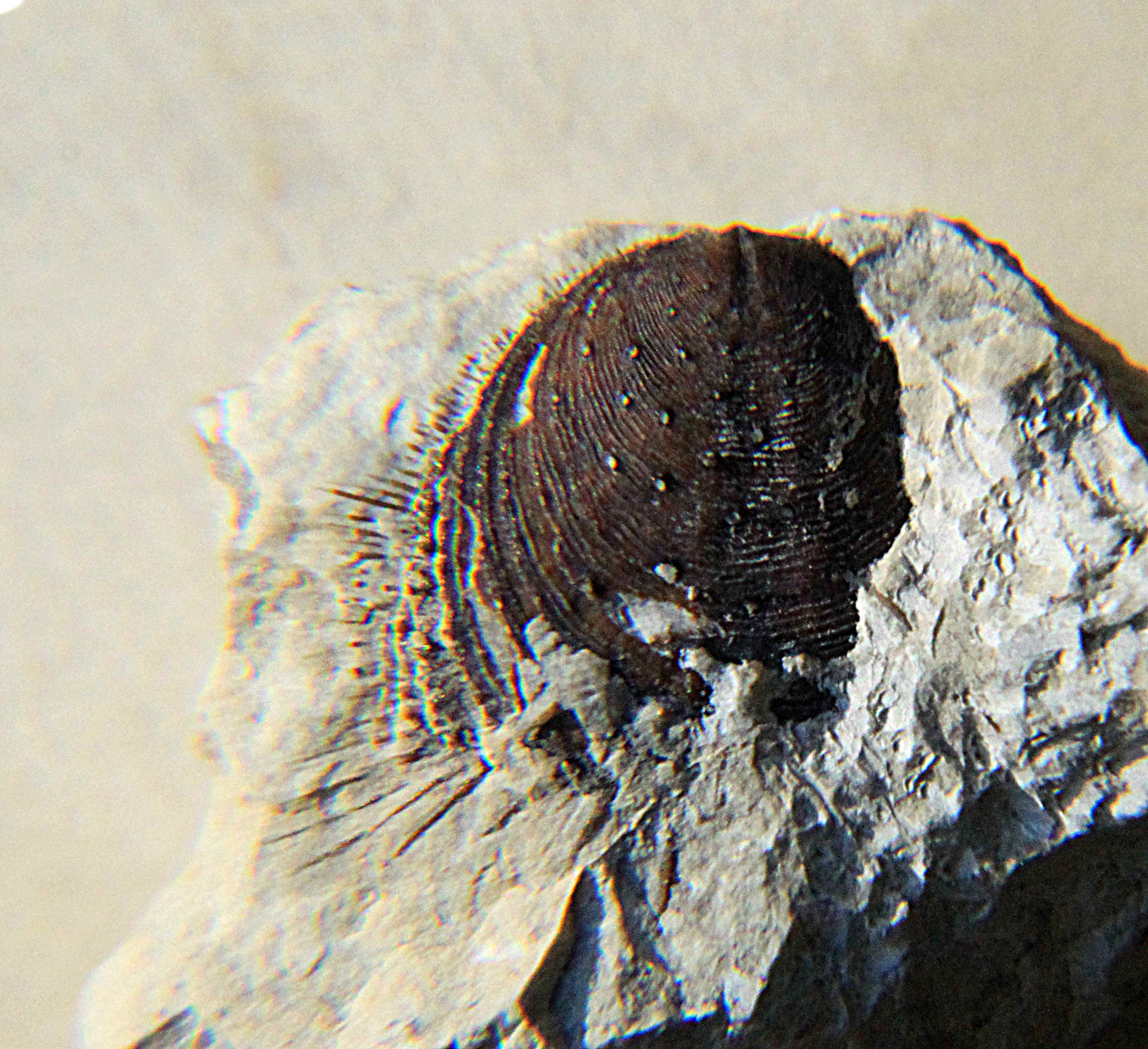
Schizambon perspinosum, 8 mm, used to be covered in hairthin long spines

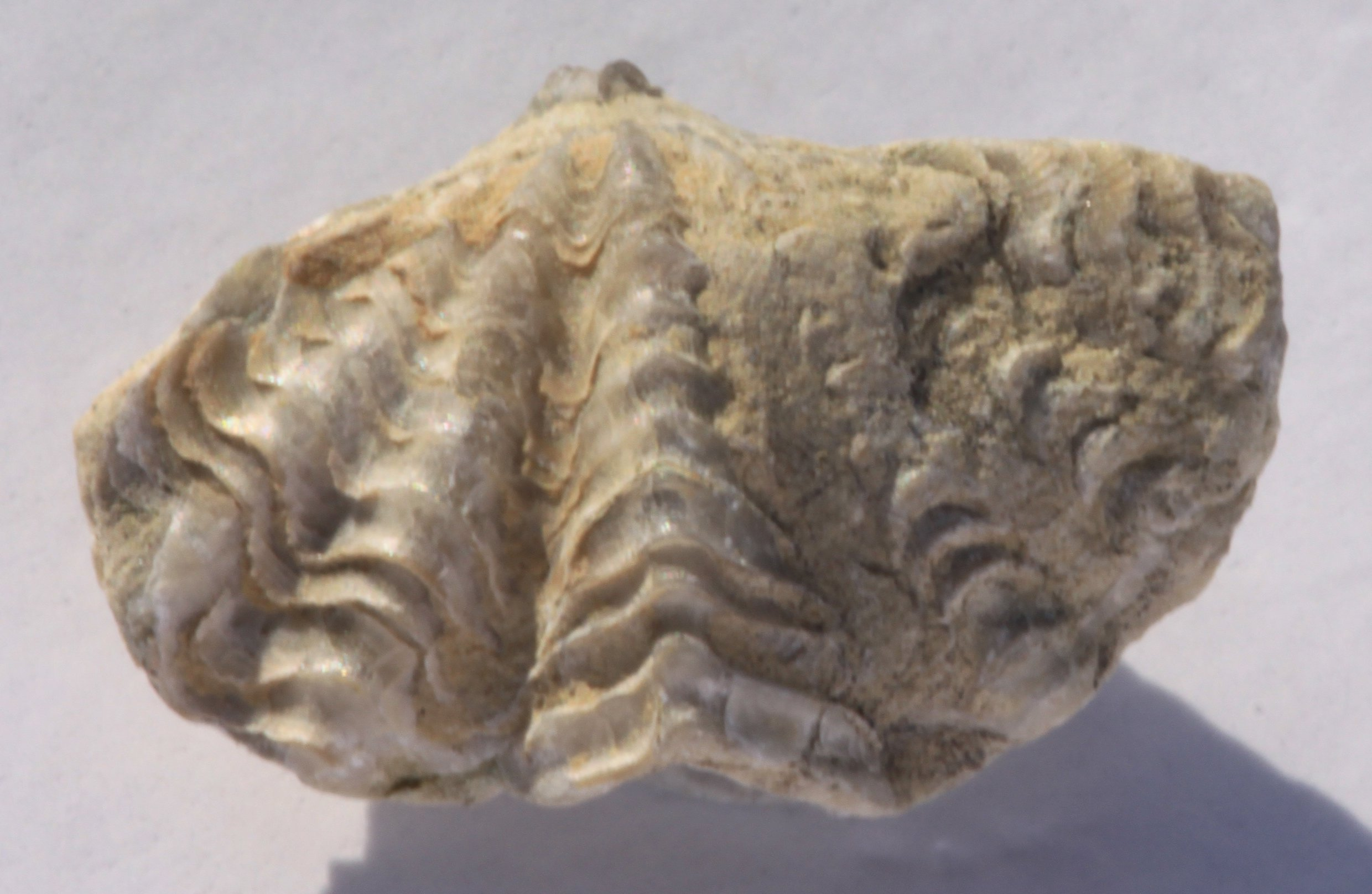
a Spirifer perlamellosus lampshell

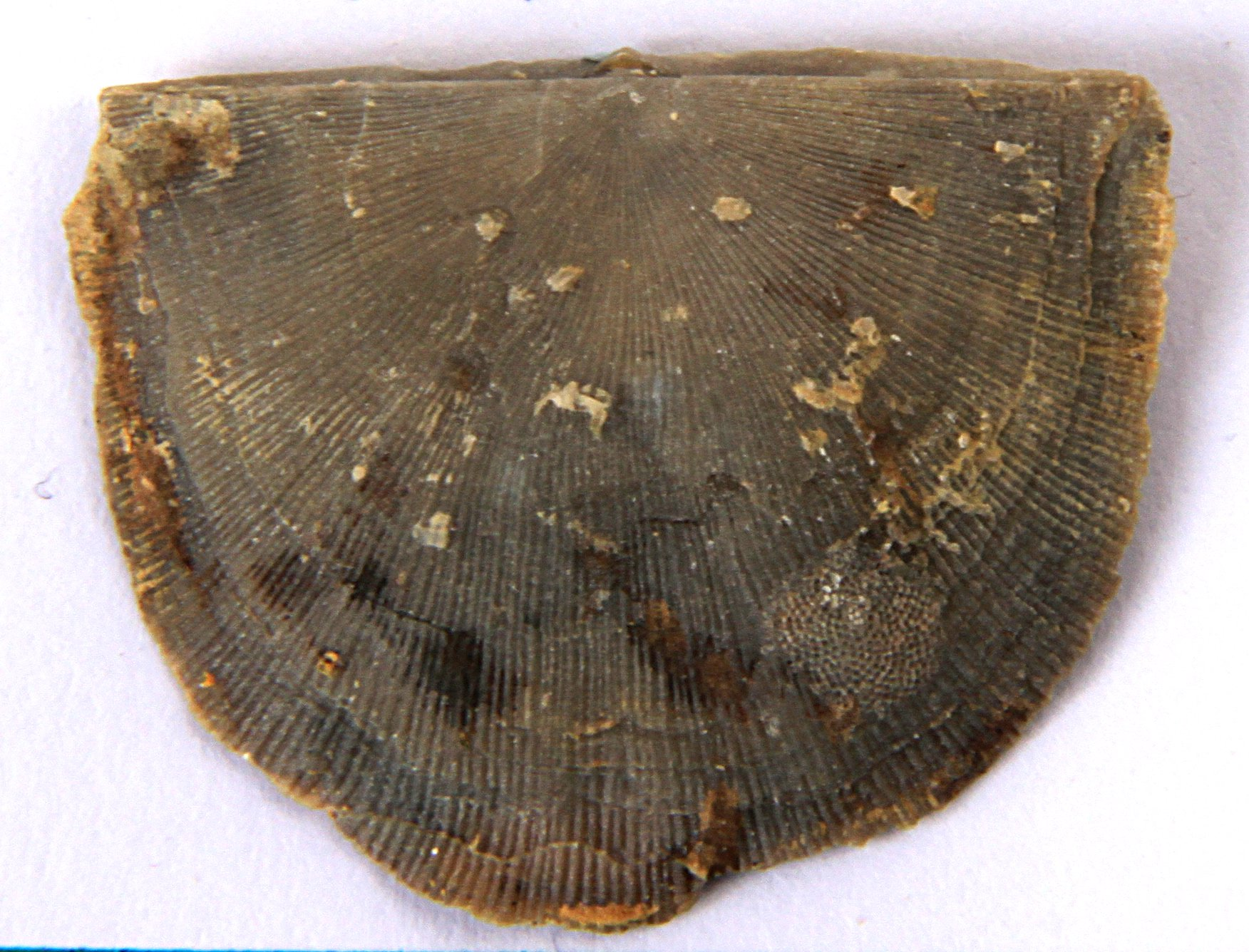
Looking at the brachial valve of a Strophomena costellata

- Acanthocrania erecta (mountain lake member?)
- Acanthocrania oklahomensis (pooleville member)
- Acanthocrania subquadrata (mountain lake member)
- Ancistorhyncha costata (corbin branche member)
- Ancistorhyncha globularis (pooleville member)
- Athelelasma oklahomense (mountain lake member)
- Bellimurina compressa (mountain lake member)
- Bellimurina subquadrata (mountain lake member)
- Camerella anteroplicata (pooleville member)
- Camerella oklahomensis (pooleville member)
- Chaulistomella crassa (mountain lake member)
- Chaulistomella magna [=Dinorthis subquadrata] [=Valcourea magna] (pooleville member)
- Chaulistomella mira (mountain lake member)
- Chaulistomella mundula (mountain lake member)
- Chaulistomella nitens (mountain lake member)
- Chaulistomella obesa (mountain lake member)
- Cliftonia occidentalis
- Craniops tenuis (pooleville member)
- Cyclospira parva (pooleville member)
- Dactylogonia sculpturata parva (mountain lake member)
- Dactylogonia subaequicostellata (mountain lake member)
- Doleroides compressus (mountain lake member)
- Doleroides oklahomensis (pooleville member)
- Ectenoglossa cf. sculpta (pooleville member)
- Fascifera dalmanelloidea (mountain lake member)
- Glossella liumbona (pooleville member)
- Glyptorthis costellata (pooleville member)
- Glyptorthis crenulata (pooleville member)
- Glyptorthis obesa (mountain lake member)
- Glyptorthis uncinata (mountain lake member)
- Hesperorthis crinerensis (mountain lake member)
- Hesperorthis sulcata (pooleville member)
- Lingulella galba (mountain lake member)
- Lingulella cf. glypta (pooleville member)
- Lingulasma oklahomense (pooleville member)
- Macrocoelia bella (mountain lake member)
- Mimella extensa (mountain lake member)
- Mimella subquadrata (mountain lake member)
- Multicostella sulcata (mountain lake member)
- Murinella partita (mountain lake member)
- Onychoplecia tenuis (mountain lake member)
- Oepikina sp.
- Oepikina expatiata (mountain lake member)
- Oepikina extensa (pooleville member)
- Oepikina formosa (pooleville member)
- Oepikina gregaria (mountain lake member)
- Orbiculoidea eximia (pooleville member)
- Orthis tricrenata
- Oxoplecia filosa (mountain lake member)
- Oxoplecia gouldi (pooleville member)
- Oxoplecia occidentalis
- Pachyclossa biconvexa (pooleville member)
- Paurorthis macrodeltoidea (pooleville member)
- Petrocrania sp. (mountain lake member)
- Petrocrania inflata (pooleville member)
- cf. Philhedra sp. (mountain lake member)
- Platymena cf. bellatula (pooleville member)
- Plectorthis symmetrica
- Protozyga costata (pooleville member)
- Protozyga elongata (mountain lake member)
- Protozyga loeblichi (pooleville member)
- Protozyga magnicostata (mountain lake member)
- Pseudolingula imperfecta
- Oepikina minnesotensis [=Rafinesquina minnesotensis]
- Rostricellula sp. (pooleville member)
- Rostricellula cuneata (mountain lake member)
- Rostricellula parva (pooleville member)
- Rostricellula transversa (pooleville member)
- Schizambon perspinosum (mountain lake member)
- Skenidoides oklahomensis (mountain lake member)
- Sowerbyella sp. (mountain lake member)
- Sowerbyella indistincta (mountain lake member)
- Sowerbyella plicatifera (mountain lake member)
- Sowerbyella variabilis (pooleville member)
- Sowerbyella vulgata (mountain lake member)
- Sowerbyites hami (pooleville member)
- Sowerbyites lamellosus (mountain lake member)
- Spirifer perlamellosus
- Strophomena costellata (pooleville member)
- Strophomena crinerensis (pooleville member)
- Strophomena oklahomensis (pooleville member)
- Valcourea transversa (mountain lake member)

=== Moss animals ===
- Anolotichia deckeri
- Anolotichia impolita
- Anolotichia spinulifera
- Atactoporella bellula
- Batostoma chapparsi
- Batostoma cumingsi
- Batostoma winchelli
- Dekayella praenuntia echinata
- Eridotrypa abrupta
- Fistulipora cf. bassleri
- Hallopora dubia
- Hallopora macrostoma
- Hallopora pachymura
- Hemiphragma irrasum
- Hemiphragma pulchrum
- Heterotrypa taffi
- Homotrypa callitoecha
- Homotrypa multitabulata
- Homotrypa sagittata
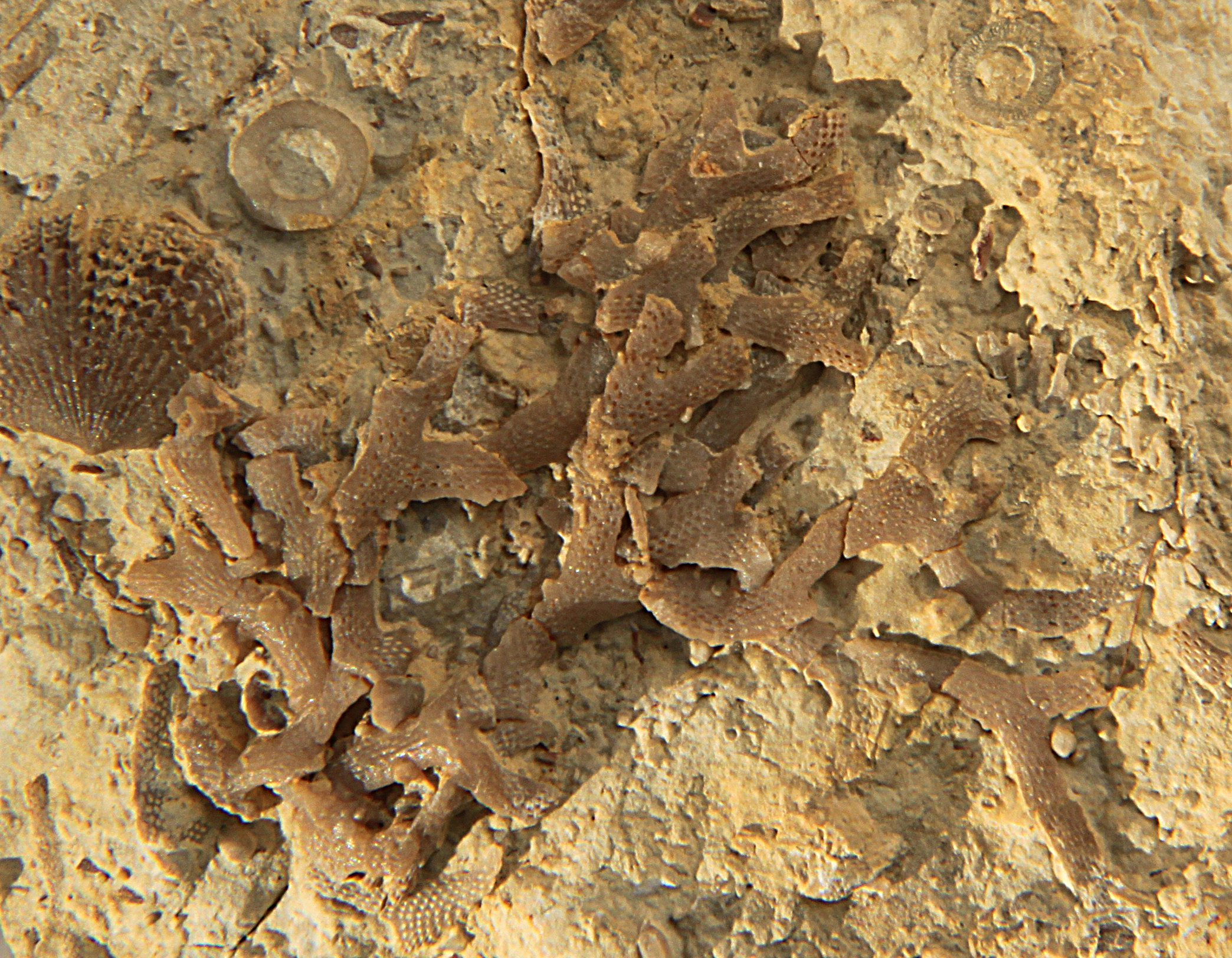
  A moss animal called Pachydictya bromidensis
- Homotrypa ulrichi
- Mesotrypa favosa
- Mesotrypa tubulifera
- Monticuliporella croneisi
- Monticuliporella peculiaris
- Monticuliporella shideleri
- Nicholsonella irregularis
- Nicholsonella laminata
- Nicholsonella moniliformis
- Pachydictya bromidensis
- Prasopora fritzae
- Stromatotrypa frondosa
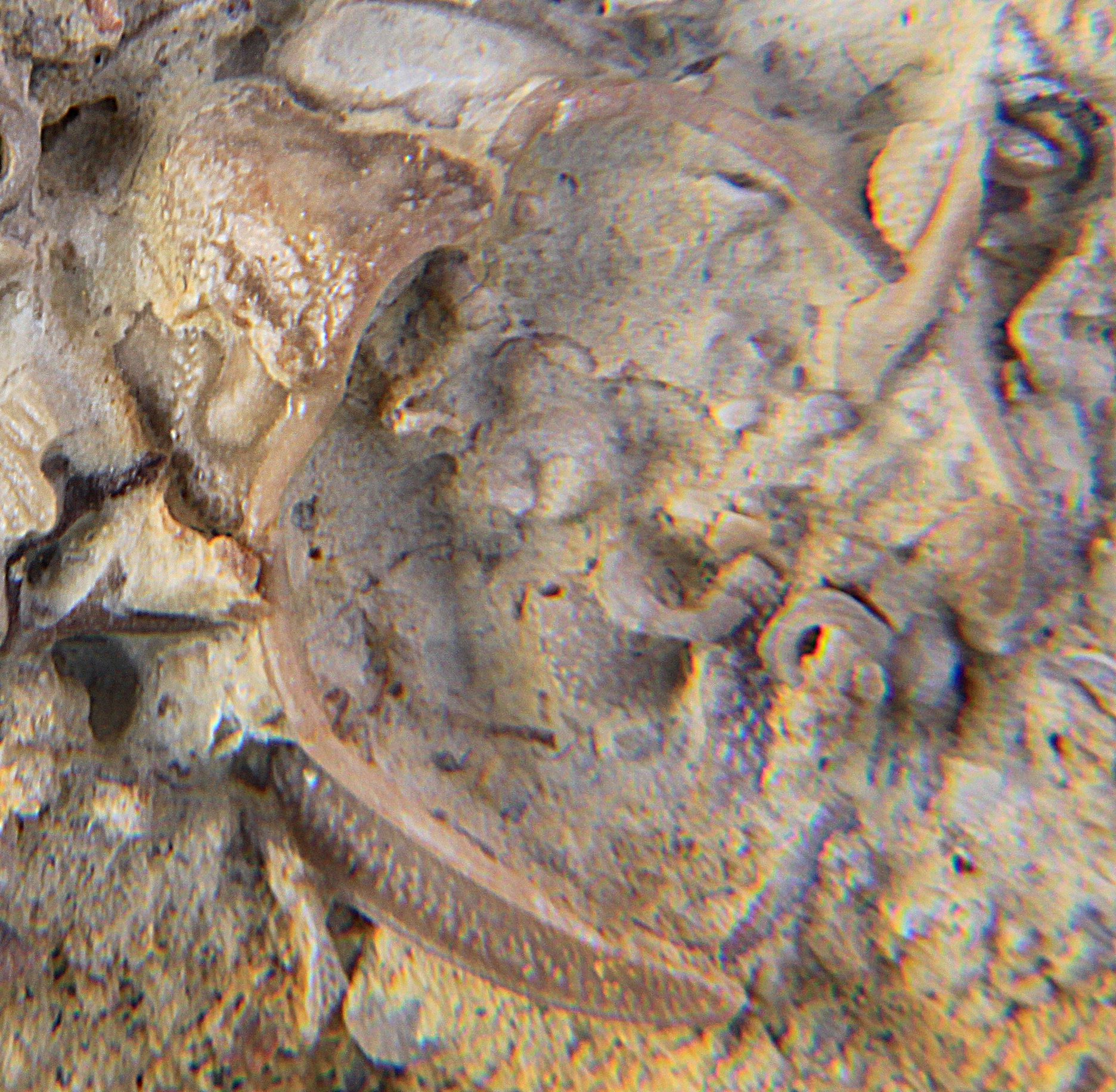
  the cephalon of Dolichoharpes reticulata

=== Arthropods ===
==== Trilobites ====
- Amphilichas subpunctatus
- Apianurus sp.
- Bumastoides milleri
- Bumastus sp.
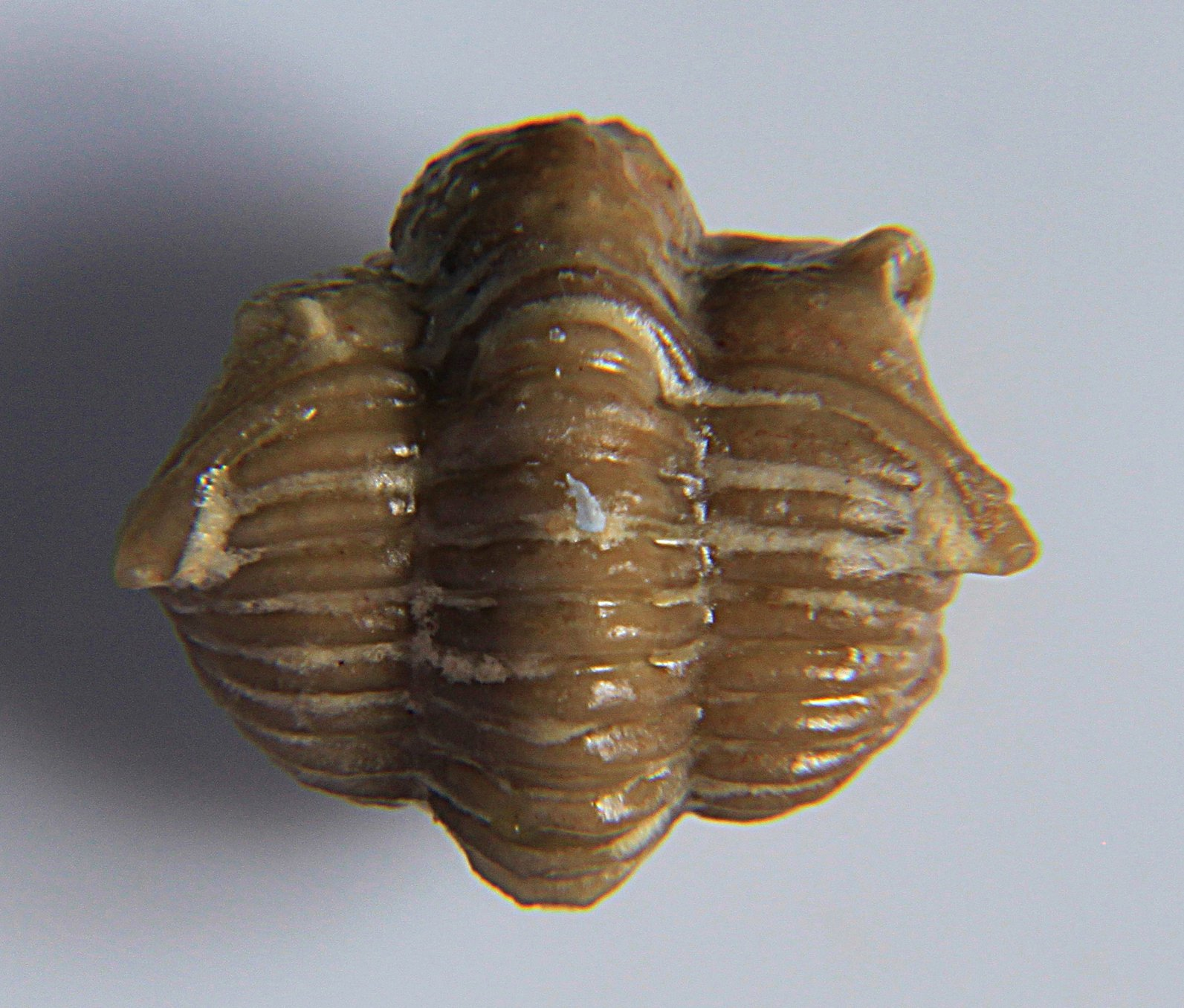
  defensively roled Frencrinuroides capitonis
- Calliops armatus
- Calliops divaricatus
- Calyptaulax annulata (Mountain Lake Member)
- Ceratocephala graffhami
- Ceraurus ruidus [=Eoceraurus trapezoidalis]
- Cybeloides sp.
- Dolichoharpes reticulata [=procliva]
- Estoniops? divaricatus
- Failleana sp.
- Frencrinuroides capitonis [=Encrinuroides capitonis]
- Harpillaenus sp.
- Illaenus americanus
- Isoteloides sp.
- Isotelus gigas
- Lonchodomas mcgeheei
- Nanillaenus punctatus
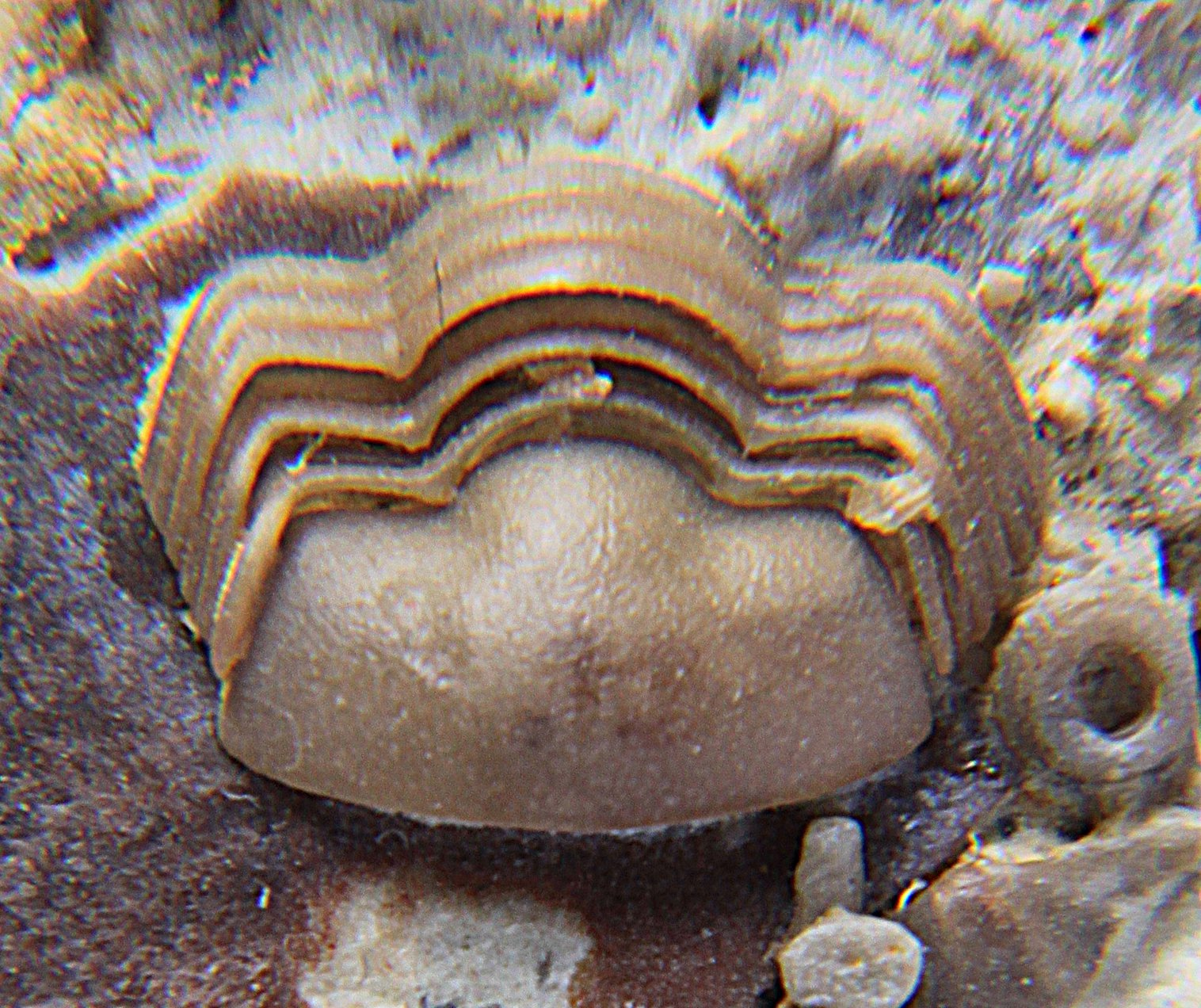
  A Nanillaenus punctatus pygidium
- Otarion sp.
- Pandaspinapyga salsa
- Pliomerops canadensis (Mountain Lake Member)
- Probolichas sp.
- Remopleurides sp.
- Sphaerocoryphe sp.
- Thaleops jaanussoni (Mountain Lake Member)
- Vogdesia bromidensis Shaw 1974 (Esker 1964) [=Homotelus bromidensis] (Mountain Lake Member)
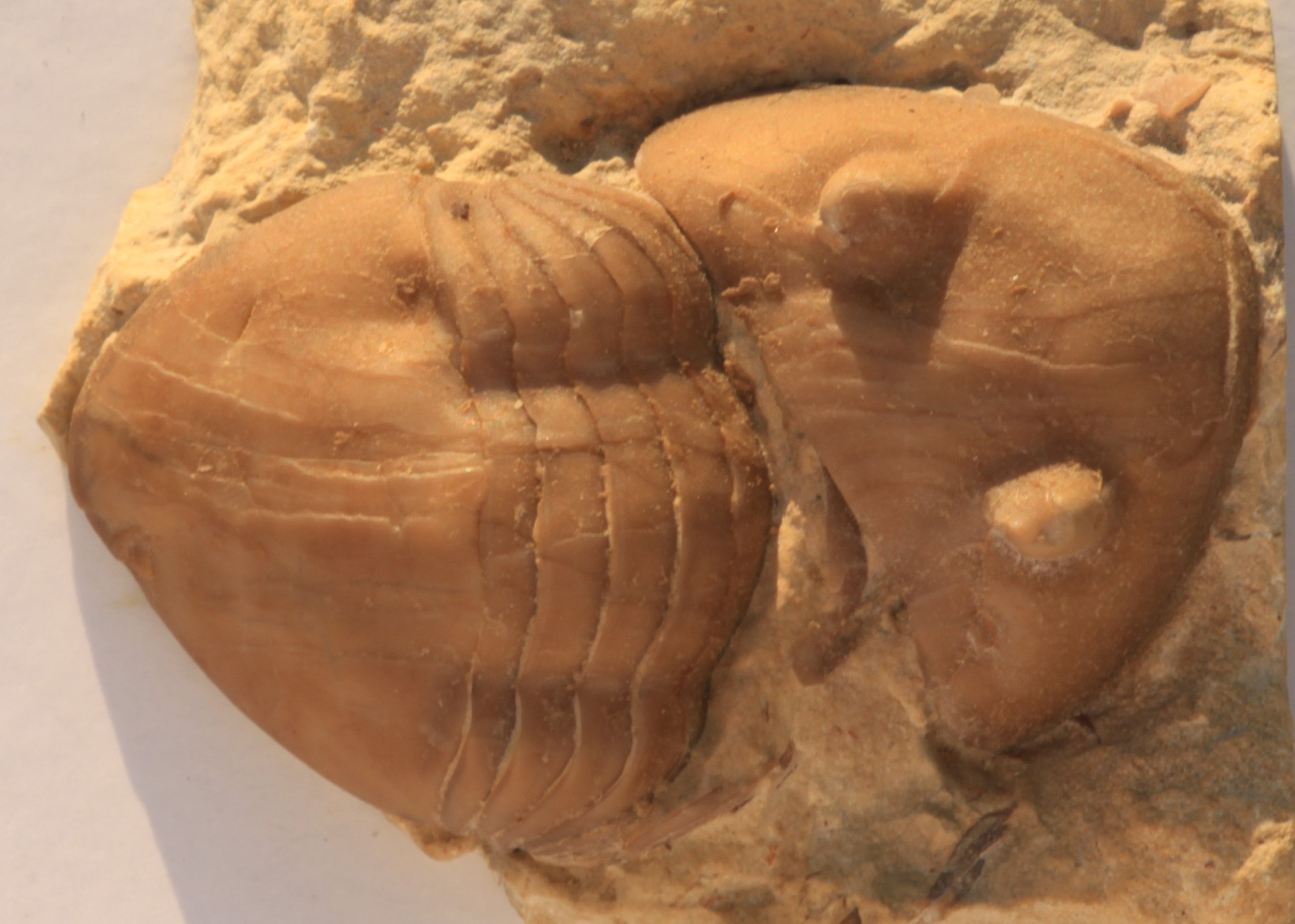
  an Asaphid trilobite known as Homotelus bromidensis

==== Clam shrimps ====
- Bromidella reticulata
- Bythocypris cylindrica
- Cryptophyllus oboloides
- Dicranella bicornis
- Eridoconcha magna
- Eridoconcha simpsoni
- Eurychilina reticulata
- Eurychilina ventrosa
- Halliella labiosa
- Krausella arcuata
- Leperditella cf. deckeri
- Leperditella inflata
- Primitiopsis bassleri
- Schmidtella umbonata
- Ulrichia initialis

=== Molluscs ===
- Helicotoma umbilicata
- Liospira vitruvia
- Aristerella nitidula

=== Echinoderms ===
==== Sea urchins and sand dollars ====
- Bromidechinus rimaporus (Pooleville Member)

==== Edrioasteroids ====
- Cyathocystus oklahomae

==== Cystoids ====
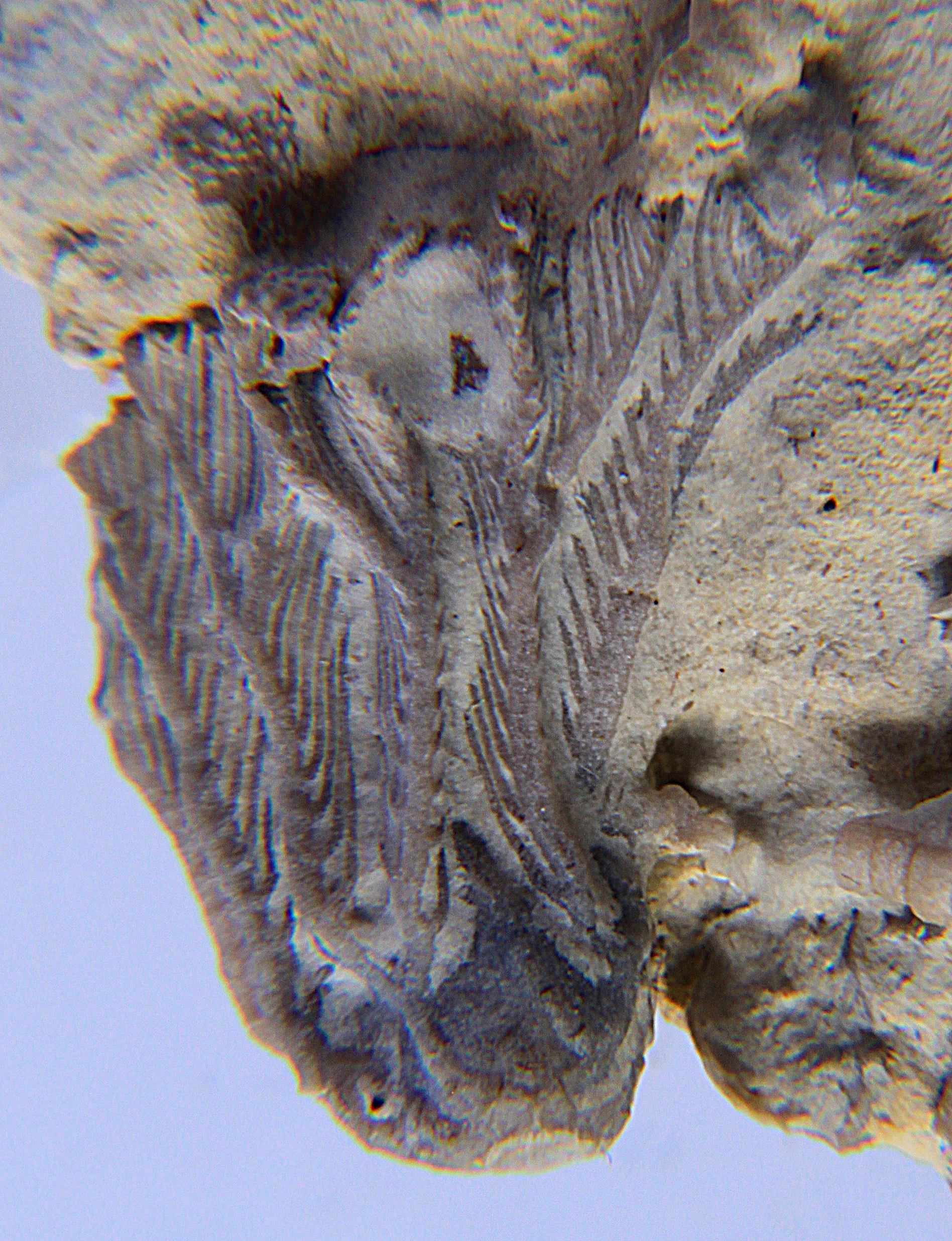
Anthracocrinus primitivus

- Amygdalocystites tribranchiatus
- Anthracocrinus primitivus
- Cheirocrinus ardmorensis
- Cheirocrinus cf. loeblichi
- Echinoencrinites cf. ornatus
- Enoploura cf. papillata
- Eumorphocystus multiporata
- Glyptocytites loeblichae
- Glyptocytites logani
- Hesperocystus deckeri
- Myeinocytites natus
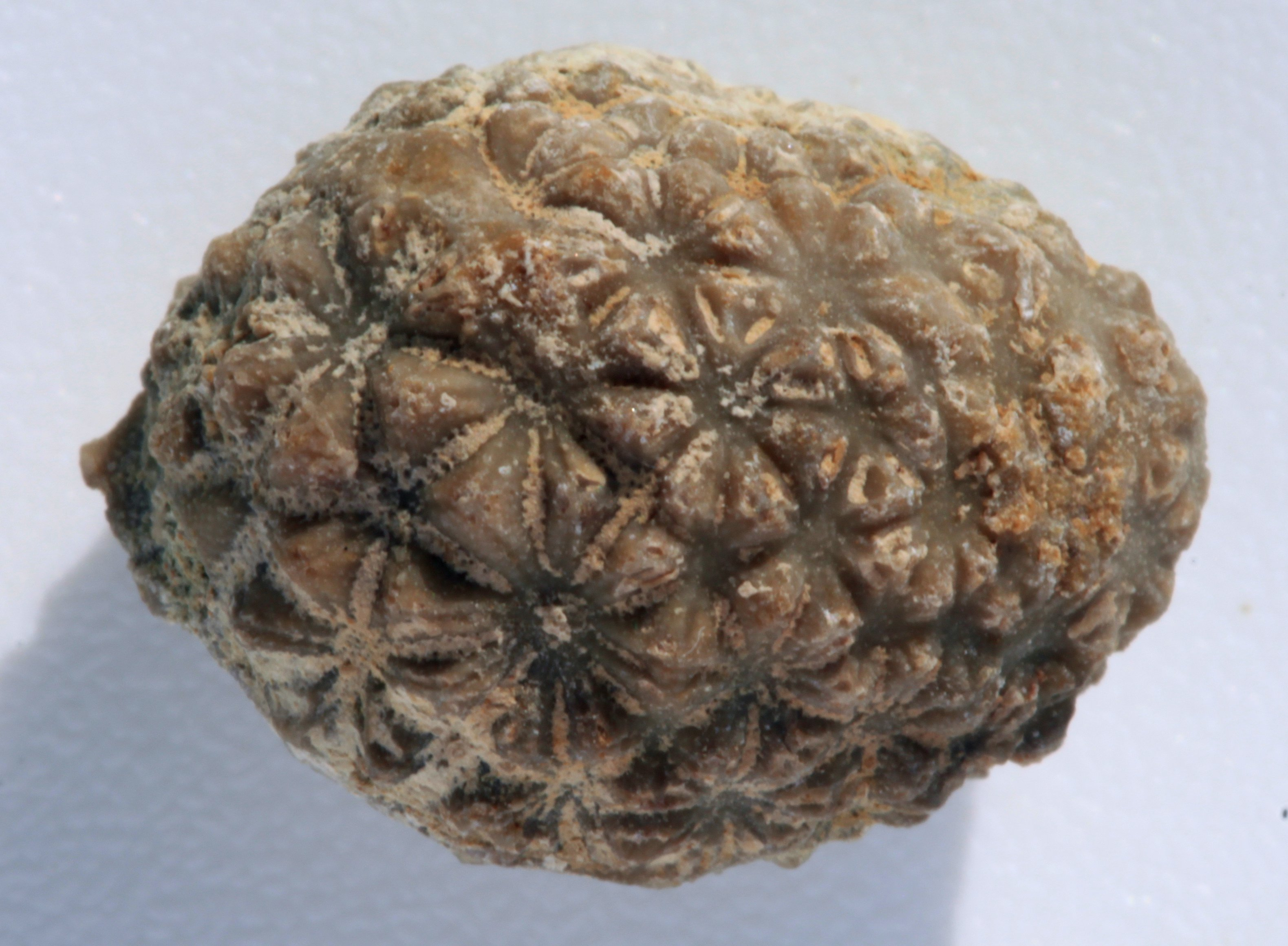
  a Oklahomacystis tribrachiatus cystoid
- Oklahomacystus tribranchiatus
- Pararchaeocrinus decoratus
- Platycystites bassleri
- Platycystites bromidensis
- Platycystites cristatus
- Platycystites fimbratus
- Platycystites levatus
- Pleurocystites watkinsi
- Quadrocystis graffhami
- Synclairocytis angulatus
- Synclairocytis sulphurensis
- Tanaocystis watkinsi
- Traskocrinus sp.

==== Sea lilies ====
- Annulocrinus ramifer
- Archaeocrinus subovalis
- Calceocrinus longifrons
- Carabocrinus treadwelli
- Euptychocrinus skopaios
- Hybocrinus crinerensis
- Hybocrinus nitidus
- Hybocrinus pyxidatus
- Palaeocrinus hudsoni
- Paracremacrinus laticardinalis

=== Chordates ===
==== Teeth of jawless fish (conodonts) ====
- Ansella crassa Bauer 1994
- Ansella nevadensis (Ethington and Schumacher)
- Baltoniodus gerdae (Bergström)
- Bryantodina aequalis Bauer 1994
- Cahabagnathus sweeti (Bergström)
- Cardiodus abbreviatus
- Cardiodus densus
- Cardiodus robustus
- Cordylodus sp.
- Curtognatus sp.
- Curtognatus cordiformis
- Curtognatus coronata
- Curtognatus limitaris
- Eoplacognathus elongatus (Bergström)
- Erismodus typus Branson and Mehl
- cf. Leptochirognatus sp.
- Leptochirognatus extensa
- cf. Microcoelodus sp.
- Microcoelodus asymmetricus
- Microcoelodus inornatus
- Microcoelodus intermedius
- Microcoelodus minutidentatus
- Microcoelodus typuis
- Oneotodus? ovatus (Stauffer)
- Oistodus suberectus
- Pharagmodus ambiguus Bauer 1994
- Phragmodus flexuosus
- Plectodina edentula Bauer 1994
- Polycaulodus bidentatus
- Polycaulodus tridentatus
- Staufferella falcata (Stauffer)
- Trichognatus obtusa
- Trucherognatus distorta
- Trucherognatus irregularis
- Walliserodus declivis Bauer 1994
