= Microzarkodina =

Microzarkodina Temporal range: Middle Ordovician

Scientific classification
- Kingdom: Animalia
- Phylum: Chordata
- Infraphylum: Agnatha
- Class: †Conodonta
- Order: †Ozarkodinida
- Genus: †Microzarkodina; Lindström, 1971

Species
- †Microzarkodina bella; †Microzarkodina flabellum; †Microzarkodina hagetiana; †Microzarkodina ozarkodella; †Microzarkodina parva; †Microzarkodina russica

Extinct genus of jawless fishes

Microzarkodina is an extinct genus of conodonts mainly from the Middle Ordovician of Baltoscandia. The Microzarkodina apparatus probably consisted of 15 or 17 elements: four P, two or four M and nine S elements. The S elements include different Sa, Sb1, Sb2, and Sc element types.

== Use in stratigraphy ==
The base of the Darriwilian, the fourth stage of the Ordovician, lies just above the North Atlantic Microzarkodina parva conodont zone.
