= Maurits Lindström =

Swedish geologist and paleontologist

- Born: 10 May 1932
- Died: 14 November 2009 (aged 77)
- Citizenship: Sweden
- Awards: Årets geolog Pander Medal
- Scientific career
- Fields: Geology, Paleontology, Meteoritics
- Workplaces: Stockholm University

Maurits Lindström (10 May 1932 – 14 November 2009) was a Swedish geologist and paleontologist. Lindström's initial work was divided among two topics conodont paleontology and the structural geology of the Scandinavian Caledonides in Lappland.

In 1970, he described the conodont families Cordylodontidae, Gondolellidae, Proconodontidae and Rhipidognathidae. In 1971, he described the conodont genera Baltoniodus, Microzarkodina and Paracordylodus. Lindström published conodont studies up to 1987 after which he only supervised students working with conodonts.

In the late 1980s Lindström began to study ancient impact craters in the Fennoscandian Shield. His studies have confirmed earlier speculations that Tvären and Lockne are craters.

== Awards and tributes ==
In 1985 he became member of the Royal Swedish Academy of Sciences and in 2009 he was awarded the prize "Årets geolog" (Geologist of the Year) by Geosektionen of Naturvetarna.

He received the Pander Medal awarded by the Pander Society, an informal organisation founded in 1967 for the promotion of the study of conodont palaeontology.
