= Cordylodus =

Cordylodus Temporal range: Furongian ~488–416 Ma

Scientific classification
- Kingdom: Animalia
- Phylum: Chordata
- Infraphylum: Agnatha
- Class: †Conodonta
- Order: †Proconodontida
- Family: †Cordylodontidae
- Genus: †Cordylodus; Pander, 1856

Species
- †C. andresi; †C. angulatus; †C. caboti; †C. caseyi; †C. drucei; †C. excavatus; †C. intermedius; †C. lindstromi; †C. primitivus; †C. prion; †C. proavus; †C. rotundatus; †C. viruanus

Extinct genus of marine lamp shells

Cordylodus is an extinct genus of conodonts in the family Cordylodontidae.

== Use in stratigraphy ==
It is suggested that Cordylodus andresi can be a marker of the Cambrian Stage 10.

== Distribution ==
Fossils of Cordylodus have been found in Argentina, Australia, Canada (Quebec), China, Colombia (Tarqui, Huila), Kazakhstan, Malaysia, Mexico, Norway, the Russian Federation, Sweden, and the United States, in the states of Alaska, Minnesota, Nevada, New York, Oklahoma (Bromide Formation), Vermont and Wyoming.

C. horridus has been recovered from the Blakely Sandstone and C. angulatus from the Collier Shale, Ordovician geologic formations in the Ouachita Mountains of Arkansas and Oklahoma.
