= Cordylodontidae =

Scientific classification
- Domain: Eukaryota
- Kingdom: Animalia
- Phylum: Chordata
- Infraphylum: Agnatha
- Class: †Conodonta
- Order: †Proconodontida
- Family: †Cordylodontidae; Lindström, 1970

Genera
- †Cordylodus; †Eoconodontus; †Iapetognathus

Family of jawless fishes

Cordylodontidae is a family of conodonts.

Genera are Cordylodus. Eoconodontus and Iapetognathus.
