= Cypridodella =

Cypridodella Temporal range: Upper Triassic

Scientific classification
- Kingdom: Animalia
- Phylum: Chordata
- Class: †Conodonta
- Genus: †Cypridodella Mosher, 1968

Species
- †Cypridodella bidentata; †Cypridodella elongata; †Cypridodella muelleri; †Cypridodella multidentata; †Cypridodella postera; †Cypridodella serrulata; †Cypridodella spiculata; †Cypridodella spengleri; †Cypridodella unialata; †Cypridodella venusta

Extinct genus of jawless fishes

Cypridodella is an extinct genus of conodonts.

The Alaunian, a sub-age also known as "Middle Norian", in the Upper Triassic, begins with the first appearance of the ammonites Drepanites rutherfordi and Cyrtopleuritis bicrenatus and with the conodont Cypridodella multidentata. The stage ends with the first appearance of the ammonites Gnomohalorites cordilleranus and Sagenites quinquepunctatus and the conodont Cypridodella bidentata.
