= Proconodontida =

Proconodontida Temporal range: Furongian – Ordovician Possible descendant taxon Belodellida survives to the Devonian or Permian

Scientific classification
- Kingdom: Animalia
- Phylum: Chordata
- Infraphylum: Agnatha
- Class: †Conodonta
- Subclass: †Cavidonti
- Order: †Proconodontida; Sweet, 1988

Synonyms
- Cordylodontacea Lindström, 1970; Proconodontacea Miller, 1981; Fryxellodontoacea Miller, 1981

Extinct order of conodonts

Proconodontida is an order of conodonts which originated in the late Cambrian (Furongian) and persisted partly through the Ordovician. The ancestral proconodont, Proconodontus, was one of the earliest euconodonts ("true conodonts") to appear. Proconodonts are often equated with the broader group Cavidonti, which occupies one side of a basal division in the evolution of early euconodonts in the Cambrian. All other euconodonts occupy Conodonti, the other side of the Cambrian split.

Proconodontida may be ancestral to another order, Belodellida. Belodellids originate in the Ordovician and survive up to the Devonian or even the Permian (if Caenodontus qualifies as a member of the order).

== Description ==
Cavidonts were simple conodonts, tending to maintain smooth and thin-walled elements with a hyaline structure. They were often coniform (horn- or tooth-shaped) with a semi-symmetrical or elliptical cross-section. The basal cavity was deeper than in early members of their sister taxon Conodonti. The apparatus is quinquimembrate at most (with five or fewer different element forms) and P elements are infrequent.

Lateral keels and subtle lines of serrations are frequently found in the hook-shaped elements of bellodelids, while other proconodonts rarely deviate from one or more basic conical structures. The Ordovician proconodont Fryxellodontus is occasionally considered ancestral to Polonodus and pygodontids, which had more unusual elements covered with ridges, nodes, and denticles.

== Taxonomy ==
Cavidonti and its interrelationships were first established by Sweet (1988). Many families and larger groups are paraphyletic and not yet evaluated by cladistic analyses.

- Cavidonti Sweet, 1988
  - Proconodontida Sweet, 1988
    - Proconodontus Miller, 1969 (family Proconodontidae Lindström, 1970) - Ancestral to Cordylodontidae, Fryxellodontidae, and Belodellidae?
    - Pseudooneotodus? Drygant, 1974 (family Pseudooneotodidae Wang & Aldridge, 2010) (affinities very uncertain)
    - Cordylodontidae Lindström, 1970
    - Fryxellodontidae Miller, 1981 - Possibly ancestral to Pygodontidae?
    - Pygodontidae? Bergstrom, 1981 (may be prioniodontids instead)
  - Belodellida? Sweet, 1988
    - Ansellidae? Fåhraeus & Hunter, 1985
    - Belodellidae Khodalevich & Tschernich, 1973 - Ancestral to Ansellidae and Dapsilodontidae?
    - Dapsilodontidae? Sweet, 1988

A different taxonomic arrangement, proposed by Dzik (1991), does not use Cavidonti as a grouping. Instead, it classifies proconodontids (families Proconodontidae, Cordylodontidae, and Fryxellodontidae) as members of the order Panderodontida and the superfamily Cordylodontacea. The order Belodellida is broken up and removed from their status as descendants of proconodontids. Bellodellidae and the component taxa of Dapsilodontidae (Besselodus and Dapsilodus) were moved into the superfamily Panderodontacea, closer to Panderodontidae and Strachanognathidae. Ansellidae is given a more distant placement among the Prioniodontida. A 1994 reevaluation of Panderodus argued that Belodellidae may have close affinities to Panderodontida, while Besselodus and Dapsilodus are best classified within the order Protopanderodontida.
