= Tulip Beds =

Fossil locality of the Burgess Shale

- Stratigraphic range: Middle Cambrian (Miaolingian); 508 Ma
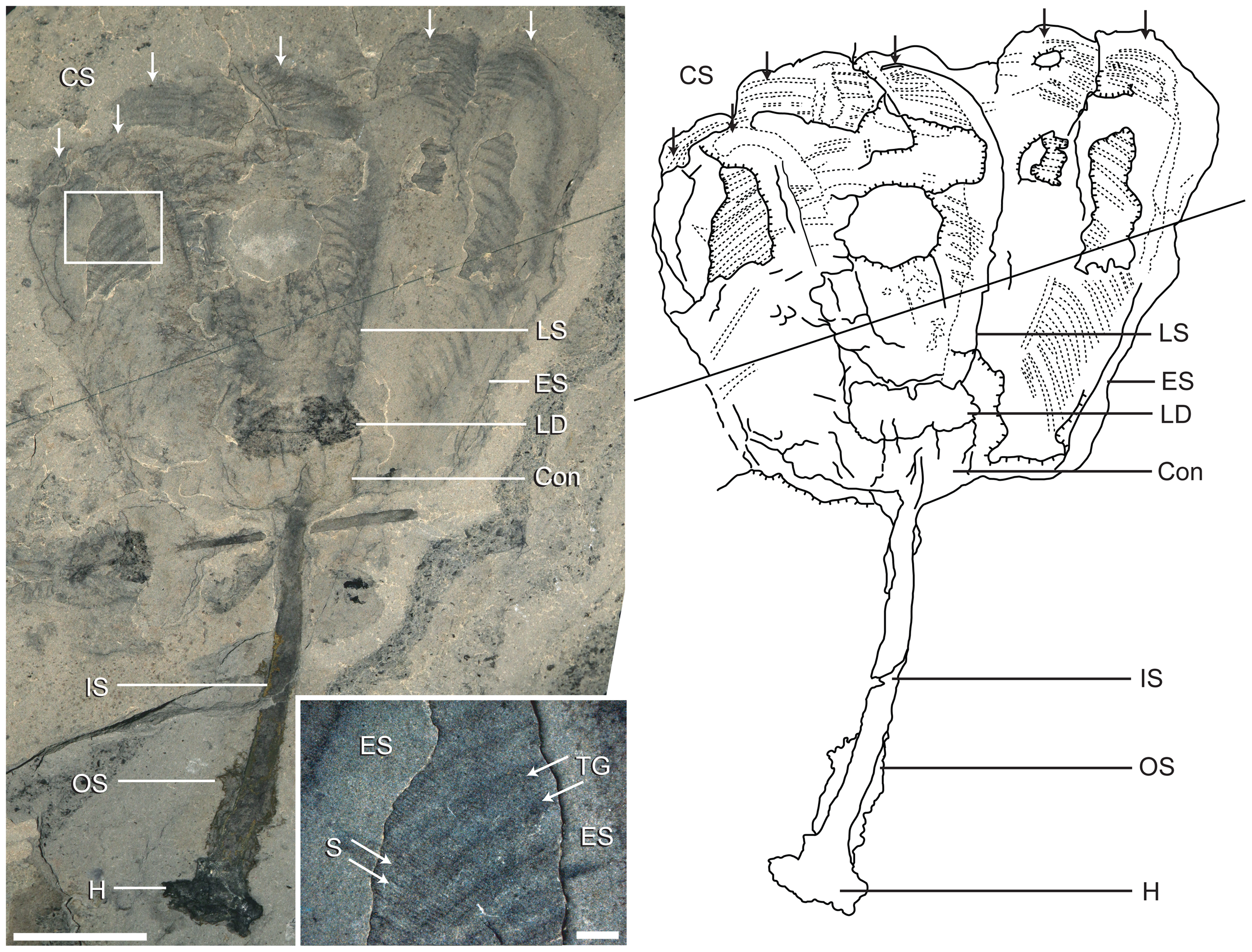
- Holotype specimen of Siphusauctum gregarium, the namesake organism of the Tulip Beds
- Type: Bed
- Unit of: Campsite Cliff Shale Member
- Area: Two outcrops 0.2 km (0.12 mi) apart
- Thickness: 12 m (39 ft)

Lithology
- Primary: Shale

Location
- Coordinates: 51°24.1′N 116°27.4′W
- Region: Field, British Columbia
- Country: Canada
- Extent: Very limited

Type section
- Named for: Siphusauctum gregarium, due to the flower-like appearance of the taxon, and its common abundance at the locality

The Tulip Beds (Formally known as the "S7 locality") is a fossil locality within the larger Burgess Shale that is located in Canada's Yoho National Park. It is a smaller member of the larger Campsite Cliff Shale Member, which exists above the Yoho River Limestone Member, on top of Mount Stephen. The locality is dated to the Miaolingian epoch of the Cambrian period, around 508 million years old. The beds represent one of the more recently discovered localities from the Burgess Shale, with it being first uncovered in 1983. Fossils from the Tulip Beds are found within multiple separate outcrops: the "Above Campsite quarry" and the "Talus Site". The Tulip Beds have yielded plentiful fossils, with up to 2,553 fossil specimens have been collected from the two outcrops since the localities discovery. The majority of the fossils (up to 70%) are known from the Above Campsite outcrop, with the majority of the collecting occurring between 1983-2010. The locality gained its name due to the copious amount of fossils from the area belonging to Siphusauctum gregarium, a species of stem-group ctenophore colloquially known as the "Tulip Animal". This species is one of the most abundant organisms from the Tulip Beds, with at least 1,133 specimens known from the locality. Due to its stratigraphic location at the base of the Campsite Cliff Shale Member, the Tulip Beds represent one of the oldest localities within the Burgess Shale. Like the majority of the other localities of the Burgess Shale, the ecosystem of the Tulip Beds sat at the base of a large submarine canyon known as the Cathedral escarpment. However, the ecosystem of the beds were more distal to the base of the escarpment compared to the other localites. The ecosystem would've sat under 100 to 300 meters (330 to 1000 feet) of water, either at the margin, or in the Mesopelagic zone. The fauna of the Tulip Beds are dominated by sessile taxa, in terms of overall abundance, with mobile taxa having a slightly greater amount of diversity. The fauna of the Tulip Beds is made up of both taxa found in other localites of the Burgess Shale, and other taxa known only from this locality.

== Location and stratigraphy ==
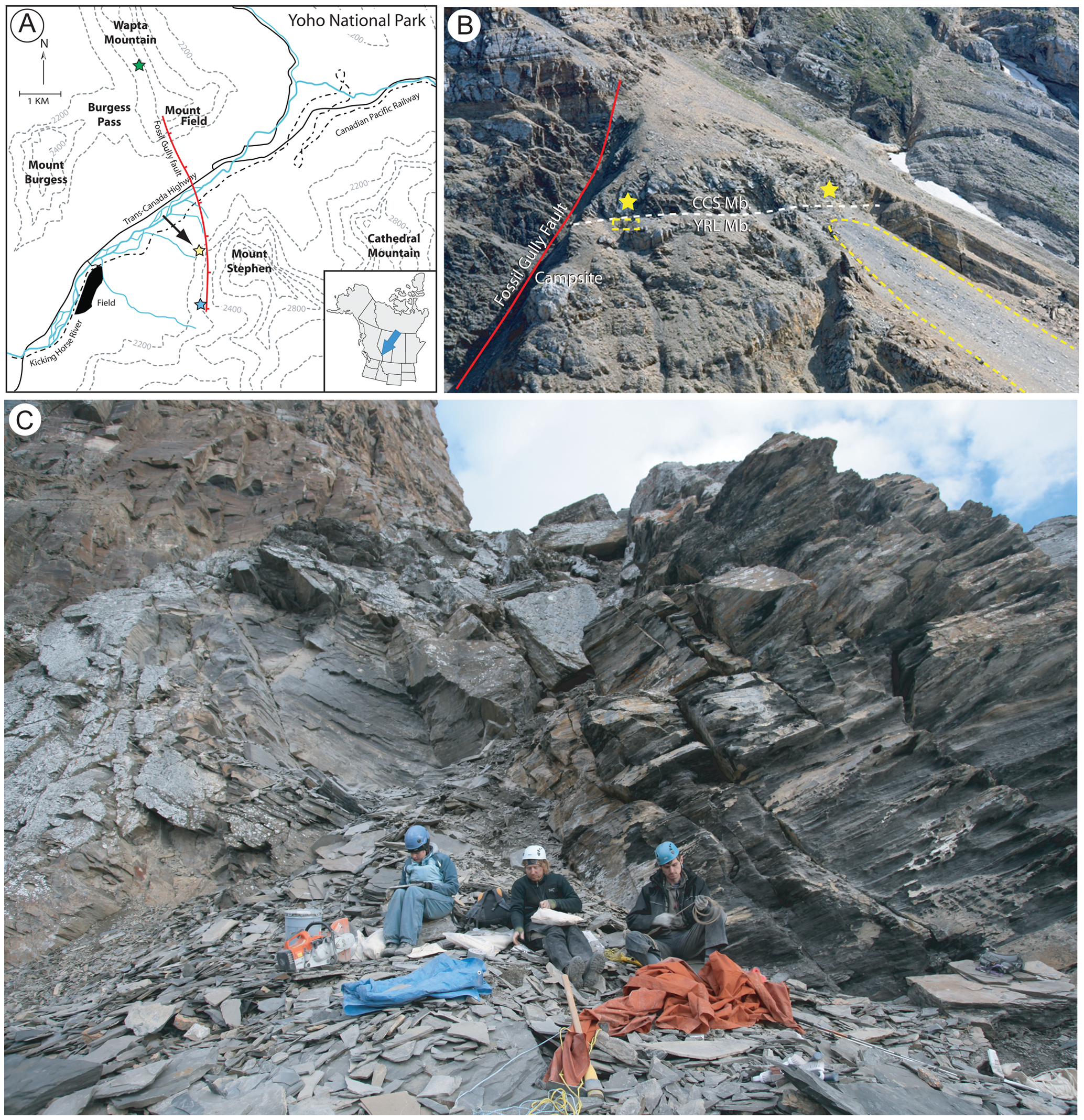
Location, and exposures of the Tulip Beds (yellow star) in comparison to Mount Stephen, and other localities of the Burgess shale.

The Tulip Beds were first discovered in 1983, making it one of the more recently discovered localities of the Burgess Shale. Originally, the Tulip Beds was simply known as the "S7 locality", and would later receive its name due to the common occurrence of Siphusauctum gregarium fossils at the site. The locality is located on the northwestern portion of Mount Stephen, near the town of Field in the province of British Columbia. The site itself is around 4 km (2.5 mi) southwest of the younger Walcott Quarry locality, which itself is located on Fossil Ridge. The beds extend for at most 150 meters (492.2 feet), with typical height of around 3-12 meters (9-12 feet) tall along the mountainside. The base of the Tulip Beds occurs on top of the larger Yoho River Limestone Member, making it one of the oldest localities of the Burgess Shale. Fossils from the locality are known from two separate outcrops: an in situ quarry nicknamed "Above Campsite", and multiple talus deposits nicknamed the "Talus Site". These two sites are around 0.2 km (0.12 mi) apart, and show the characteristic mudstone, limestone, and concretions known from the Campsite Cliff Shale Member. The exact age of the member is thought to belong to the third series of the fifth stage of the Cambrian, around 508 million years ago, as evidenced by the presence of the Bathyuriscus-Elrathina Zone within the member.

Map of the Burgess Shale including the Tulip Beds (shown in dark orange)

== Paleoenvironment ==
The exact location of the Tulip Beds compared to the base of the Cathedral escarpment is thought to be more distal compared to the majority of the other Burgess Shale localities, such as Marble Canyon and the Walcott quarry. This is thought due to the relative distance of Mount Stephen compared to the escarpment, which is around 1,500 meters (4921.3 feet) away from the mountains northeastern portion. The ecosystem would've sat In gloomy water, near, or in the Mesopelagic zone, similarly to most of the other nearby localities. The majority of the fauna of the Tulip Beds include sessile taxa, notably Siphusauctum gregarium, which is known from around 1,133 specimens alone from the locality. Alongside S. gregarium, the sessile taxa mostly include suspension feeding organisms. The fauna includes taxa common in other Burgess Shale localities, and some which are only found at the Tulip Beds.

== Arthropoda ==
A wide variety of total-group (including hymenocarines and megacheirans) and stem-group arthropods (including radiodonts) are known from the Tulip Beds.

Arthropods
Genus	Phylum	Higher taxon	Notes	Images
Caryosyntrips	Stem-group Arthropoda	Not applicable	An enigmatic panarthropod that is characterized by a pair of forward facing frontal appendages. Originally classified as a problematic radiodont, its true taxonomic placement remains a point of contention. Its name literally translates to "nutcracker", due to the proposed movement of its appendages during prey capture.	
Anomalocaris	Stem-group Arthropoda	Radiodonta	The largest radiodont from the Burgess shale, and the ecosystem's apex predator. This radiodont is known from hundreds of articulated frontal appendages in the Tulip Beds, often in large clusters, suggesting the area represented a mass molting site for this arthropod relative.	
Peytoia	Stem-group Arthropoda	Radiodonta	A moderately rare peytoiid radiodont, often known from articulated frontal appendages, also found within the Walcott quarry. Originally named as a jellyfish due to the structure of its mouthparts, but was later recognized as a radiodont.	
Hurdia	Stem-group Arthropoda	Radiodonta	A common peytoiid known from carapace elements and frontal appendages in the Tulip Beds. Occasionally found in clusters, similarly to Anomalocaris.	
Amplectobelua	Stem-group Arthropoda	Radiodonta	A member of the amplectobeluidae family, mainly known from the older Maotianshan Shales in China, however, the species Amplectobelua stephenensis is known from the Burgess Shale. This species is recognizable due to the massive distal endite on its frontal appendages, giving them an almost claw-like appearance.	
Isoxys	Arthropoda	Order Isoxyida	A very common bivalved arthropod that occupied a nektonic niche. Known for its cosmopolitan distribution in various other sites. Various species are known from the Burgess Shale alone.	
Marrella	Arthropoda	Order Marrellomorpha	One of the most common organisms of the Burgess Shale, with over 25,000 specimens having been recorded, this small marrellomorphid arthropod is known from a majority of the sites localities, including the Tulip Beds. It most likely lived a mainly nektonic lifestyle, with its swimming appendages used in a backstroke motion, and its large spines potentially acting as stabilizers.	
Perspicaris	Arthropoda	Order Hymenocarina	A hymenocarine arthropod known from two named species from the Burgess Shale; P. dictynna and P. recondita, which differ in maximum size (66 millimetres (2.6 in) in P. recondita vs 29 millimetres (1.1 in) in P. dictynna), as well as proportions of the tail.	
Nereocaris	Arthropoda	Order Hymenocarina	A large hymenocarine, known also from the Collins Quarry, and is known from two species, N. exilis and N. briggsi. It possessed an elongated trunk region, an enlarged carapace, and a set of three eyes (two stalked eyes, and one median eye).	
Branchiocaris	Arthropoda	Order Hymenocarina	A hymenocarine that had a pair of short segmented tapered antennules with at least 20 segments, as well as a pair of claw-like appendages. Also possibly known from deposits in China and Utah.	
Tuzoia	Arthropoda	Order Hymenocarina	A genus of large hymenocarine, and one of the largest known "bivalved arthropods" in the fossil record. Known from a variety of other deposits in North America, Australia, China, Europe and Siberia. It was most likely a nekto-benthic animal, swimming close too the seafloor. However, it is possible it could've been capable of walking on the seafloor as well.	
Sidneyia	Arthropoda	(unranked) Artiopoda	Sidneyia was a large 13 centimeter (5.1 in) long predatory artiopod that most likely was a durophagous predator, due to young trilobites, hyoliths, and brachiopods being commonly found as stomach contents. Other species are known from earlier deposits in China.	
Naraoia	Arthropoda	(unranked) Artiopod	A common nektaspid artiopod, and is characterized by a large alimentary system and sideways oriented antennas. Sediments present in the gut of Naraoia suggest that it may have been a deposit feeder, eating large amounts of soil while looking for soft bodied prey.	
Olenoides	Arthropoda	(unranked) Artiopod	One of the more well known trilobites from the shale, with more than 213 specimens having been recorded, Olenoides is also known from several Cambrian sites across the northern hemisphere. This trilobite was likely a benthic generalist, feeding on a wide variety of prey items.	
Bathyuriscus	Arthropoda	(unranked) Artiopod	A member of the Dolichometopidae family, this trilobite was a nekto-benthic predator, and is an important stratigraphic marker for the larger Campsite Cliff Shale Member. Its major characteristics are a large forward-reaching glabella, pleurae with very short spines, and a medium pygidium with well-impressed furrows.	
Elrathina	Arthropoda	(unranked) Artiopod	a trilobite belonging to the ptychopariida that is especially abundant on fossil ridge, with about 25% of all trilobite fossils described belonging to this genus	
Hanburia	Arthropoda	(unranked) Artiopoda	A trilobite possibly belonging to the family Dolichometopidae, and is also known from the Walcott Quarry.	
Leanchoilia	Arthropoda	Order Megacheira	A megacheiran arthropod. Leanchoilia and its relatives are distinguished from other arthropods by their frontal appendages, which split into three flagella bearing podomeres, which was probably used as both sensory and raptorial structures.	
Habelia	Arthropoda	Chelicerata	While previously enigmatic, a 2017 redescription found that Habelia was a stem-group member of the Chelicerata subphylum. The species known from the Tulip Beds, Habelia? brevicauda has been questioned as to whether or not it belongs to this genus, or if its a new taxon.	

== Lobopodia ==
Like with most other Burgess Shale localities, the lobopodians (worm-like panarthropods from which arthropods arose from) are rare within the Tulip Beds, with a handful of genera known.

Lobopodians
Genus	Phylum	Higher taxon	Notes	Images
Hallucigenia	Lobopodia	Hallucigeniidae	A spined lobopodian of the Hallucigeniidae family, This genus is one of the more iconic taxa from the shale. The generic name reflects the type species' unusual appearance and eccentric history of study; when it was erected as a genus, H. sparsa was reconstructed as an enigmatic animal upside down and back to front.	
Entothyreos	Lobopodia	Luolishaniidae	A unique spined lobopodian of the Luolishaniidae family, and only found within the Tulip Beds. The most common lobopodian of the locality, this panarthropod was a suspension feeder, like most of the other members of its family. It is unique for possessing a large amount of sclerotization compared to other lobopodians, comparable to that of true arthropods.	

== Porifera ==
Among the sessile taxa of the Tulip Beds, Poriferans (sea sponges) hold the highest diversity, with up to a dozen genera known.

Poriferans
Genus	Phylum	Higher taxon	Notes	Images
Choia	Porifera	Demospongiae	A widespread genus of sunflower-like demosponge that sat high above the seafloor via long stalks. This genus is known from a variety of sites of both Cambrian and Ordovician age	
Hamptonia	Porifera	Demospongiae	A genus of sea sponge. It is known from the Middle Cambrian Burgess Shale and the Lower Ordovician Fezouata formation. It was first described in 1920 by Charles Walcott.	
Leptomitus	Porifera	Demospongiae	Leptomitus is the tallest sponge of the Burgess Shale, and is known from several other localities. Its name is derived from the Greek lept ("slender") and mitos ("thread"), referring to the overall shape of the sponge.	
Hazelia	Porifera	Demospongiae	A genus of spicular demosponge known from the Burgess Shale, the Marjum formation of Utah, and possibly Chengjiang. Its tracts are mainly radial and anastomose to form an irregular skeleton. Its oxeas form a fine net in the skin of the sponge. It is one of the more common sponges of the shale.	
Pirania	Porifera	Demospongiae	A genus of cactus-like demosponge known from the Burgess Shale and the Fezouata formation. It is named after Mount St. Piran, a mountain situated in Banff National Park, Alberta.	
Leptomitella	Porifera	Demospongiae	A genus of demosponge.	
Takakkawia	Porifera	Demospongiae	A genus of sponge in the order Protomonaxonida and the family Takakkawiidae. It reached around 4 cm in height, and its structure consisted of four columns of multi-rayed, organic spicules (perhaps originally calcareous or siliceous) that align to form flanges. The spicules form blade-like structures, ornamented with concentric rings. It was named after Takakkaw Falls, which marks the start of the trail to Fossil Ridge.	
Vauxia	Porifera	Demospongiae	A genus of demosponge that had a distinctive branching mode of growth. Vauxia had a skeleton of spongin (flexible organic material) common to modern day sponges. Vauxia is named after Mount Vaux, a mountain in Yoho National Park.	
Wapkia	Porifera	Demospongiae	A genus of sea sponge with radial sclerites, known from the Burgess Shale. It was first described in 1920 by Charles Walcott.	
Eiffelia	Porifera	Stem-group Hexactinellida	A genus of sponges known from the Burgess Shale as well as several Early Cambrian small shelly fossil deposits. Eiffelia generally have star-shaped six-rayed spicules, with rays diverging at 60°, occasionally with a seventh ray perpendicular to the other six.	
Diagoniella	Porifera	Hexactinellida	A genus of hexactinellid (glass sponge) known for its conical shape, with a diagonally arranged skeleton.	
Petaloptyon	Porifera	Hexactinellida	A goblet-shaped hexactinellid sponge known from rare fragments from the Burgess Shale. The fragments show the living animal had a stalk, and had panels with a lattice pattern.	
Protoprisma	Porifera	Hexactinellida	This creature was a glass sponge that had long, prismatic branches.	

== Ctenophora ==
Ctenophores (comb jellies), whilst not being the most diverse group in the Tulip Beds, were by far the most abundant group, with thousands of fossils known.

Ctenophores
Genus	Phylum	Notes	Images
Siphusauctum	Stem-group Ctenophora	A stem-group ctenophore colloquially known as the "Tulip animal" due to its flower-like appearance. The namesake, and most common organism of the Tulip Beds, It lived by attaching itself to the substrate by a holdfast. This genus had a tulip-shaped body, called a calyx, into which it actively pumped water that entered through pores and filtered out and digested organic contents. It grew to a length of only about 20 cm (7.9 in).	
Dinomischus	Stem-group Ctenophora	A stem-group ctenophore that sat on the ocean floor with a long stalk, and a small holdfast. The cup-shaped body at the top of the stalk probably fed by filtering the surrounding seawater, and may have created a current to facilitate this. Multiple species are known, including D. isolatus from the Burgess Shale, and D. venustus from the Maotianshan Shales.	
Ctenorhabdotus	Ctenophora	Unlike its contemporaries, this genus more closely resembled "typical" ctenophores, with rows of cilia to help it swim in the water column. It had around 24 comb rows on its body, around three times as more than extant comb jellies.	

== Priapulida ==
A handful of priapulid worms are known from the Tulip Beds.

Priapulids
Genus	Phylum	Higher taxon	Notes	Images
Ottoia	Priapulida (?)	Archaeopriapulida	This priapulid is the most common worm of the Burgess Shale, with thousands of known specimens alone belonging to this genus. Ottoia was a burrower that hunted prey with its eversible proboscis. It also appears to have scavenged on dead organisms.	
Selkirkia	Priapulida (?)	Archaeopriapulida	A genus of predatory, tubicolous priapulid worm. Many burrows of this worm have been found in the shale, although the majority of them are often found empty.	

== Mollusca ==
The mollusks of the Tulip Beds vary widely in terms of body plans.

Molluscs
Genus	Phylum	Higher taxon	Notes	Images
Odontogriphus	Mollusca (?)	Odontogriphidae	A bilaterian animal that had a flat, oval shaped body. This creature possessed a rasping tongue covered in multiple rows of teeth. Due to this feature resembling a radula, this creature is thought to represent a basal mollusk.	
Wiwaxia	Mollusca (?)	Wiwaxiidae	This animal possessed a set of carbonaceous scales and spines that protected it from predators. It resembled another Burgess Shale mollusk, Orthrozanclus in appearance, but its placement in mollusca is still debated.	

== Brachiopoda ==
Brachiopods (lamp shells) are moderately common within the Tulip Beds.

Brachiopods
Genus	Phylum	Higher taxon	Notes	Images
Micromitra	Brachiopoda	Paterinata	This genus is the most ornamented of the Burgess Shale brachiopods. This creature reached a size of around 10 mm in length. Many specimens of Micromitra have been found attached to the sponge Pirania, suggesting an epibenthic lifestyle for this brachiopod. This creature had a large amount of bristles (setae) that extended far beyond the rim of the shell.	
Nisusia	Brachiopoda	Kutorginata	An early rhynchonelliform brachiopod. the pedicle of Nisusia emerged from between its valves, as displayed by silicified material of N. sulcata, though it still has an opening at the apex of the pedicle valve.	
Diraphora	Brachiopoda	Rhynchonellata	An early rhynchonellatid brachiopod that had rigid appearance to its shell.	

== Chancelloriida ==
The Chancellorids (an extinct group of enigmatic sponge-like animals covered in hollow spines), are among the sessile taxa of the Tulip Beds.

Chancellorids
Genus	Phylum	Higher taxon	Notes	Images
Chancelloria	Eumetazoa	Chancelloriida	Superficially, this animal resembles a sea sponge, covered in spine-like sclerites. However it is a member of the extinct group Chancelloriidae, whose relationship to other animals are unclear.	

== Cnidaria ==
The cnidarians of the Tulip Beds are moderately rare.

Cnidarians
Genus	Phylum	Higher taxon	Notes	Images
Tubulella	stem-group Cnidaria	non-applicable	A stem-group cnidarian that lived in a slender, conical tube. This creature was most likely related to scyphozoans.	
Cambrorhytium	Cnidaria	Staurozoa	An enigmatic animal that was first described in 1908, and has been classified under a number of different groups. Currently it is thought to possibly represent a staurozoan cnidarian, more specifically a conulariid. It has also been interpreted as a cnidarian polyp of some description. The other possible affinity is with the hyolithid lophophorates.	

== Cyanobacteria ==
Cyanobacteria, being photosynthesizers, would've been key components of the shales ecosystem.

Cyanobacteria
Genus	Phylum	Higher taxon	Notes	Images
Marpolia	Cyanobacteria	Nostocales	This genus has been interpreted as a cyanobacterium, but also resembles the modern cladophoran green algae. It is known from the Middle Cambrian Burgess Shale and Early Cambrian deposits from the Czech Republic. It consists of a dense mass of entangled, twisted filaments. It may have been free-floating or grown on other objects, although there is no evidence of attachment structures.	

== Red algae (Rhodophyta) ==
Rhodophyta (red algae) are rare within the Tulip Beds, with one genus known.

Rhodophytes
Genus	Phylum	Higher taxon	Notes	Images
Wahpia	Rhodophyta	Rhodophyceae	This small alga had an array of small, slender branches. It constitutes around 0.06% of the Phyllopod Bed community	

== Miscellaneous taxa ==
This list includes taxa that are either poorly understood, or do not fit in the above groups.

Miscellaneous Taxa
Genus	Phylum	Higher taxon	Notes	Images
Mackenzia	Eumetazoa	Mackenziidae	An elongated bag-like animal. It has been found attached directly to hard surfaces, such as brachiopod shells. Mackenzia was originally described by Charles Walcott in 1911 as a holothurian echinoderm. It was later reinterpreted as a cnidarian, and may have been related to modern sea anemones. However, a paper from 2022 discovered that this genus may be closely related to members of the Ediacaran biota.	
