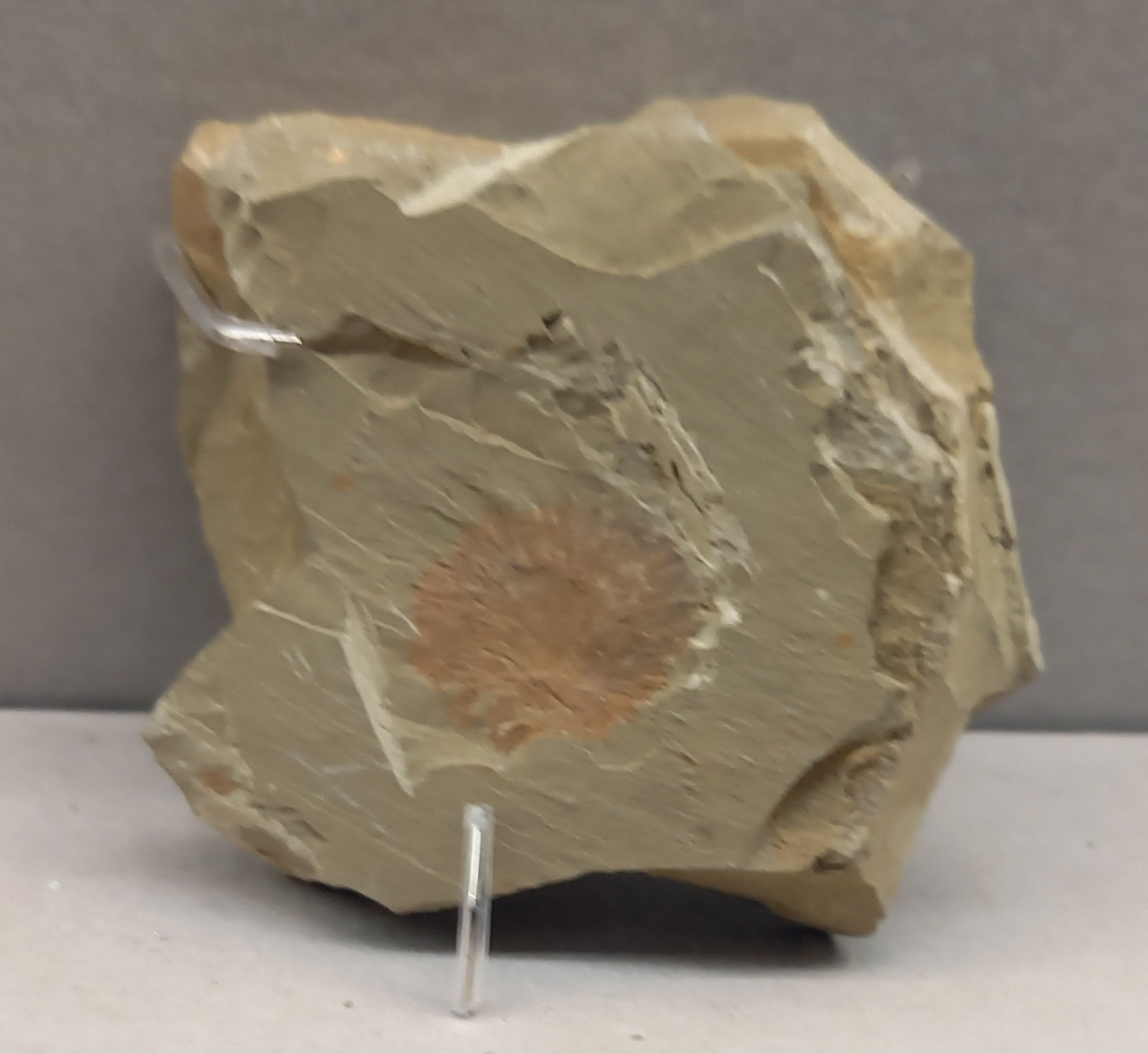
- †Choiaella radiata

Scientific classification
- Kingdom: Animalia
- Phylum: Porifera
- Class: Demospongiae
- Order: †Protomonaxonida
- Family: †Choiidae
- Genus: †Choiaella; Rigby & Hou, 1995

Type species
- †Choiaella radiata Rigby & Hou, 1995

Species
- †Choiaella radiata Rigby & Hou, 1995; †Choiaella scotica M. S. Beresi, J. P. Botting, E. Clarkson, 2010

= Choiaella =

Choiaella Temporal range: Chengjiang–Llandovery

Extinct genus of sponges

Choiaella is an extinct genus of sea sponge that belongs to the family Choiidae. This genus lived from the Early Cambrian to the Early Silurian period having a near global distribution.

== Taxonomy ==
The genus was described by J. Keith Rigby and Hou Xian-Guang in 1995 with Choiaella radiata being the type species.

This genus currently contains four described species. They are listed below:

1. Choiaella hexactinophora J. P. Botting, 2021
2. Choiaella ovata Yang, Zhao & Wu, 2003
3. Choiaella radiata Rigby & Hou, 1995 (type species)
4. Choiaella scotica M. S. Beresi, J. P. Botting, E. Clarkson, 2010

It is closely related to the genera Choia and Allantospongia. The genus represents an intermediate stage with the gradual loss of triaxons from more basal sponge groups such as Leptomitidae and basal ascosponge to more derived genera such as Hanptonia, Halichondrites and Pirania.

== Distribution ==
This genus first appears during the early Cambrian being found in the Sirius Passet Biota of Greenland, the Chengjiang Biota and Niutitang Biotas, both from Southern China. During the Ordovician period, fossils of Choiaella are found in Wales (Early Ordovician), the Fezouata Biota of Morocco (Middle Ordovician) and Wallace’s Cast, Scotland (Late Ordovician). The early Silurian has the occurrence of Choiaella being found in the Fentou Biota of South China. Due to the fossils of Choiaella being difficult to describe taxonomically, it is possible that species belonging to this genus can be found much more widely.

== Description ==
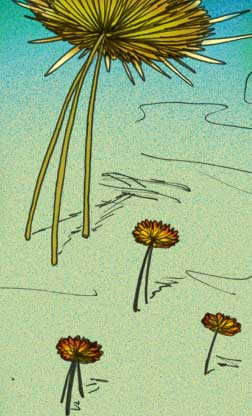
Artistic reconstruction of Choiaella radiata.

Members of this genus are small sponges having a discoidal or low broad obconical shape. The skeleton of Choiaella is composed of a longitudinal thatch of small monaxons generally on one continuous size range that are probably oxeas. The spicules of Choiaella may be bundles locally but they don’t extend beyond the edge of the disc other than as minor fringes.

=== Choiaella hexactinophora ===
Choiaella hexactinophora lived during the Middle Ordovician period. It was described in 2021 by Joseph P. Botting from specimens collected in the Castle Bank fossil deposits located in Wales. It was flat being slightly ovoid. It was fine-spiculed. This species was used to help support the creation of a new taxonomic class of sponges, Ascospongiae. It also showed that spicules in sponges evolved separately in each class.

=== Choiaella scotica ===
Choiaella scotica lived in the Southern Uplands of Scotland during the Ordovician period. It was described in 2010 by (Beresi et al. 2010) based on two specimens that were held in the collections at the National Museums of Scotland.

== Ecology ==
C. radiata coexisted sympatrically with sponge genera such as Choia and Allantospongia.
