= Fezouata Formation =

Geological formation in Morocco

- Stratigraphic range: Tremadocian – Floian
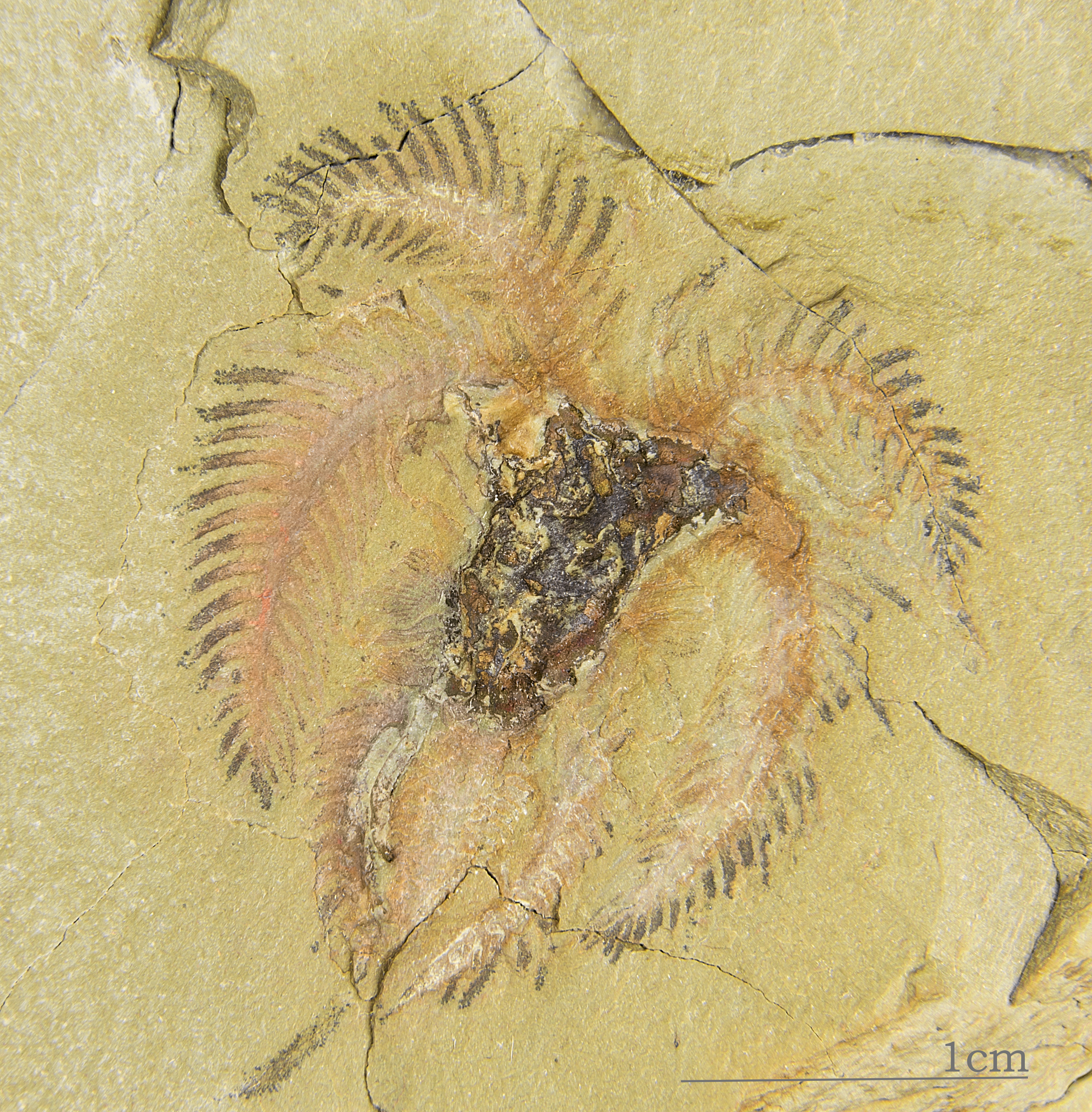
- Fossil of "Furca mauretanica", a marrellomorph arthropod from one of the exceptionally preserved intervals.
- Type: Geological formation
- Underlies: Zini Formation
- Thickness: >1,000 m (3,300 ft), combined for upper and lower formations, the two exceptionally preserved intervals ~25 m (82 ft) and 15 m (49 ft) respectively

Lithology
- Primary: Shale

Location
- Coordinates: 30.6°N 5.7°W
- Approximate paleocoordinates: 73.9°S 108.1°E
- Region: Drâa-Tafilalet
- Country: Morocco
- Fezouata Formation (Morocco)

The Fezouata Formation or Fezouata Shale is a geological formation in Morocco which dates to the Early Ordovician. It was deposited in a marine environment, and is known for its exceptionally preserved fossils, filling an important preservational window beyond the earlier and more common Cambrian Burgess shale-type deposits. The fauna of this geological unit is often described as the Fezouata biota, and the particular strata within the formation which exhibit exceptional preservation are generally termed the Fezouata Lagerstätte.

== Biota ==
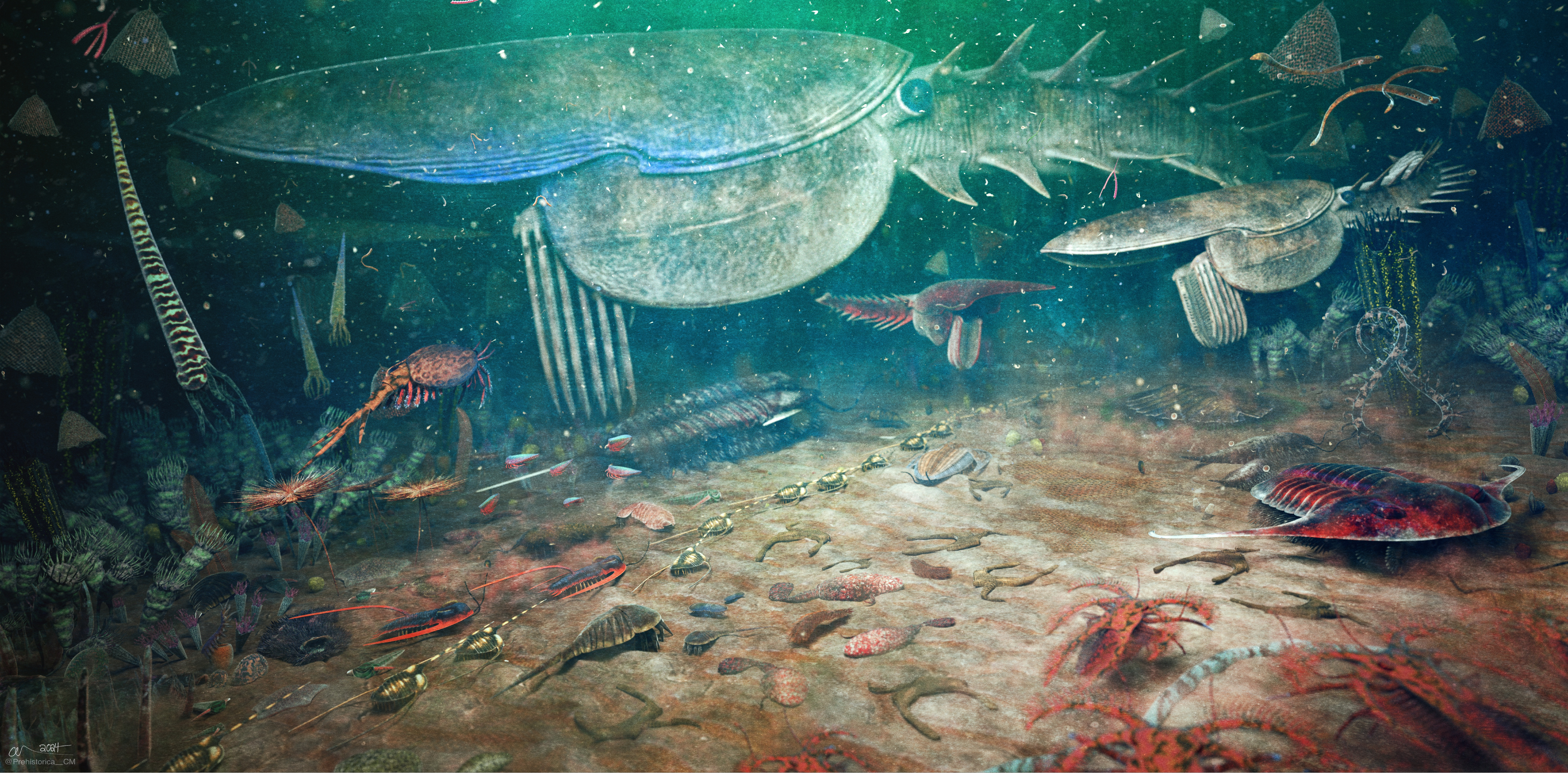
Reconstruction of the Fezouata Biota, featuring roughly 50 different species. The largest animal, Aegirocassis benmoulai (just over 2 metres in length), is depicted swimming just above the seafloor.

Over 1,500 non-mineralized specimens, representing 50 distinct taxa that have a composition similar to earlier Burgess Shale type biotas, have been recovered from the formations, in addition to a less abundant shelly fauna. The make-up of the community varies significantly through the stratigraphic sequence, with both abundances and faunal composition changing as time progresses. Major burrowing is not present, but there are small (1–3 mm wide) burrows in the sediment, which may indicate that there is not enough oxygen in the water or sediment. Particularly notable is the presence of bryozoa and graptolites, forms that are absent in the Cambrian period. Diverse echinoderms indicate a normal range of salinity, and the overall shelly assemblage is not significantly different from the normal shelly fauna expected in open Ordovician waters. The non-mineralized cohort contains a range of forms familiar from the Burgess Shale: Demosponges, lobopods, barnacles, annelids, radiodonts (e.g. Aegirocassis), possible halkieriids, marrellomorphs, paleoscolecid worms, nektaspidids, skaniids as well as the expected problematica. Other Ordovician oddballs are also present, including mitrates, machaeridians, cheloniellids and xiphosurans in abundance.

== Depositional setting ==
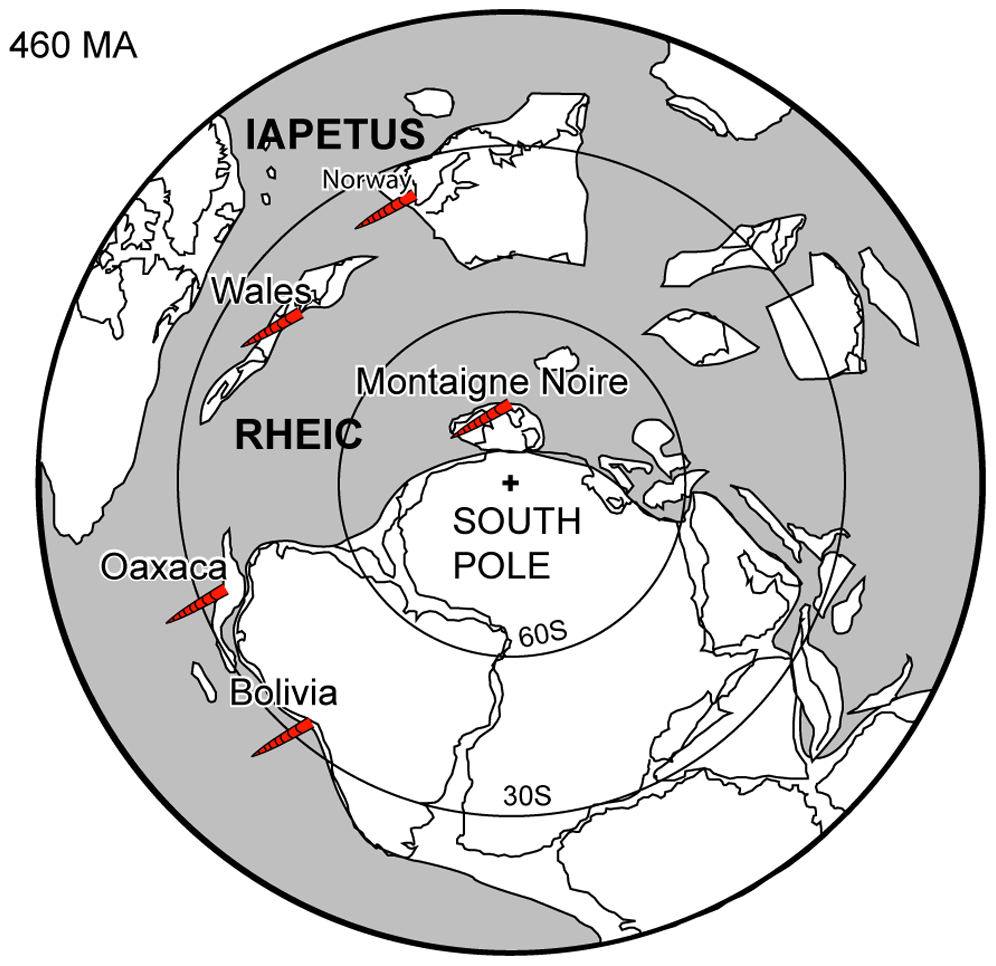
South Polar paleogeography of the Middle Ordovician, 460 Ma

The fossiliferous strata were deposited just above storm wave base (offshore to lower shoreface transition), at between 50 and 150 metres (160 and 490 ft) water depth. Organisms were likely buried in situ. Because of its placement above storm wave base, storms would have mobilized sediment that could be quickly deposited, trapping animals and leading to their preservation. Consequently, the assemblage is dominated by benthic organisms.

== Preservation ==
Fossils of the Fezouata Formation, which are usually squashed flat (although some do retain some degree of their original three-dimensionality) are often coated with a dusting of pyrite, and tin; this aspect of the fossil preservation is very similar to that at Chengjiang. Non-mineralized appendages are often preserved. While the formation as a whole is over 1,000 metres (3,300 ft) thick, only two intervals, 25 metres (82 ft) and 15 metres (49 ft) thick, provide exceptional preservation. Both of these intervals are located near the top of the lower formation, corresponding to the Araneograptus murrayi and Hunnegraptus copiosus graptolite zones respectively.

== Location and stratigraphy ==
The fossils occur within an area of 500 square kilometres (190 sq mi), in southeast Morocco's Draa Valley, north of Zagora. Stratigraphically productive layers are found through a 1.1 kilometres (0.68 mi)-thick column of rock that spans the Tremadocian and Floian epochs. Two stratigraphic intervals of the formation are fossiliferous: the lower is Late Tremadocian and sits 260 to 330 metres (850 to 1,080 ft) above the base of the formation; the upper, at 570 to 620 metres (1,870 to 2,030 ft), is mid-Floian in age.

== History ==
The Lagerstätten were first identified in the late 1990s when a local fossil collector, Ben Moula, showed some of the finds to a PhD student who was then working in the area.

=== IUGS geological heritage site ===
In respect of the "exceptional fossil preservation bridging the Cambrian Explosion and the Great Ordovician Biodiversification", the International Union of Geological Sciences (IUGS) included the "Ordovician Fezouata Shale Fossil Site at Jbel Tizagzaouine" in its assemblage of 100 "geological heritage sites" around the world, in a listing published in October 2022. The organisation defines an IUGS Geological Heritage Site as "a key place with geological elements and/or processes of international scientific relevance, used as a reference, and/or with a substantial contribution to the development of geological sciences through history."

== Paleobiota ==
After and subsequent literature:

=== Radiodonts ===
Apart from the four named species of Fezouata radiodonts, three other unnamed species occur in the formation: a third species of Pseudoangustidontus, an aegirocassisine, and a sediment-sifting hurdiid. A potential fourth species of radiodont has been found in the Floian section and is known from probable head sclerites.

Radiodonts of the Fezouata Formation
Genus	Species	Stratigraphy	Notes	Images
Aegirocassis	A. benmoulae	Araneograptus murrayi zone, Baltograptus minutus zone?	A giant filter-feeding aegirocassisine hurdiid radiodont. The largest known radiodont and one of the largest known panarthropods, at 2 metres (6.6 ft) in length.	
Falciscaris	F. mumakiana	Sagenograptus (Araneograptus) murrayi zone	A benthivorous hurdiid radiodont around a meter long. Unlike aegirocassisines, it likely sifted through sediment to capture prey, as shown by its less fine endites	
Pseudoangustidontus	P. duplospineus	Sagenograptus (Araneograptus) murrayi zone and Upper Fezouata	A filter-feeding aegirocassisine hurdiid radiodont. Originally considered enigmatic until 2023, where it was redescribed as a radiodont. Like the contemporary Aegirocassis, this genus was most likely a filter feeder, but it could have preyed upon larger food.	
Pseudoangustidontus	P. izdigua	Sagenograptus (Araneograptus) murrayi zone	A filter-feeding aegirocassisine hurdiid radiodont. Originally considered enigmatic until 2023, where it was redescribed as a radiodont. Like the contemporary Aegirocassis, this genus was most likely a filter feeder, but it could have preyed upon larger food.	
Pseudoangustidontus	P. sp.	Sagenograptus (Araneograptus) murrayi zone	A filter-feeding aegirocassisine hurdiid radiodont. Originally considered enigmatic until 2023, where it was redescribed as a radiodont. Like the contemporary Aegirocassis, this genus was most likely a filter feeder, but it could have preyed upon larger food.	

=== Trilobites ===
The largest trilobite individuals in the Fezouata Formation tend to inhabit deep oxygenated waters, with minimal influence from storms or larger predators.

Trilobites of the Fezouata Formation
Genus	Species	Stratigraphy	Notes	Images
Agerina	A. quadrata	?Cymatograptus protobalticus zone, ?Baltograptus jacksoni zone	A leiostegiid which is common at intermediate depths in the transitional zone between shoreface and offshore sediments.	
Ampyx	A. priscus	Araneograptus murrayi zone up to the ?Baltograptus jacksoni zone.	A long-spined eyeless raphiophorid which often occurs in distinctive linear clusters. These clusters are interpreted as collective behavior akin to modern Palinurus lobsters, either as biological aggregations (for spawning or moulting), or migrating groups due to environmental pressures such as storms. Other trilobites occasionally become entangled with the Ampyx clusters. This species is widely distributed in time and is most common in relatively deep (upper offshore) sediments.	
Anacheirurus	A. adserai	Araneograptus murrayi zone	A small pilekiine cheirurid, up to 4.8 centimetres (1.9 in) long, which is common in relatively deep (upper offshore) sediments. Fossils of this species are known to preserve appendages similar in form to those of Cambrian trilobites. Known from multiple life stages, including late meraspids. Some specimens may have previously been misidentified as Lehua or Parapilekia.	
Apatokephalus	A. cf. incisus	Araneograptus murrayi zone, ?Cymatograptus protobalticus zone	An uncommon remopleuridid found in relatively shallow (lower nearshore) sediments.	
Apatokephalus	A. sp.	Lower Fezouata, Upper Fezouata	A remopleuridid.	
Asaphellus	A. fezouataensis	?Baltograptus jacksoni zone	An endemic asaphid. Associated body fossils and trace fossils help to identify this species as the tracemaker for a distinctive resting trace, Rusophycus carleyi. Found at intermediate depths in the transitional zone between shoreface and offshore sediments.	
Asaphellus	A. aff. jujuanus	Araneograptus murrayi zone, ?Cymatograptus protobalticus zone, ?Baltograptus jacksoni zone	A small and common asaphid up to 6.2 centimetres (2.4 in) long, without clear preferences for specific depths.	
Asaphellus	A. sp.	Araneograptus murrayi zone	An asaphid. Known from multiple life stages, including late meraspids.	
Asaphellus	A. stubbsi	Araneograptus murrayi zone	A large endemic asaphid up to 38 centimetres (15 in) long. Found in relatively shallow (lower nearshore) sediments.	
Asaphellus	A. tataensis	Araneograptus murrayi zone, Upper Fezouata	An uncommon medium-sized endemic asaphid. Some specimens have been fossilized with unusual flattened antennae, the only reliable attributions of these structures in asaphids. The antennae may have had a particular sensory function to assist in hunting or scavenging. Found in relatively shallow (lower nearshore) sediments.	
Asaphopsis	A. sp.	Lower Fezouata	A Dikelokephalina-like trilobite.	
Basilicus	B. destombesi	Baltograptus jacksoni zone	A large asaphine asaphid up to 33 centimetres (13 in) long.	
Basilicus	B. sp.		A very large asaphine asaphid up to 51 centimetres (20 in) long.	
Basilicus	B. vidali		A large asaphine asaphid up to 36 centimetres (14 in) long.	
Bathycheilus	B. gallicus	Upper Fezouata	A bathycheilid.	
Bavarilla	B. sp.	Araneograptus murrayi zone	A small bavarillid up to 4.1 centimetres (1.6 in) long.	
Bavarilla	B. zemmourensis	Araneograptus murrayi zone, Upper Fezouata	An endemic bavarillid common in relatively shallow (lower nearshore) sediments.	
Ceraurinella?	C.? sp.	Upper Fezouata	A cheirurid.	
Colpocoryphe	C. pradesensis	?Baltograptus jacksoni zone, Baltograptus minutus zone	A rare calymenid.	
Colpocoryphe	C. thorali	?Cymatograptus protobalticus zone, Baltograptus minutus zone	A rare calymenid.	
Colpocoryphe	C. sp.	Araneograptus murrayi zone, ?Cymatograptus protobalticus zone	A rare calymenid found in relatively deep (upper offshore) sediments.	
Dactylocephalus	D. sp.		A large asaphid up to 29 centimetres (11 in) long.	
Dikelokephalina	D. brenchleyi	Araneograptus murrayi zone	A large endemic dikelokephalinid up to 33.7 centimetres (13.3 in) long. Often found in mass death assemblages, possibly for spawning akin to modern horseshoe crabs.	
Dikelokephalina	D. sp.	Lower Fezouata	A large dikelokephalinid up to 29.5 centimetres (11.6 in) long.	
Ectillaenus?	E.? sp.	Baltograptus minutus zone	An illaenid.	
Eoharpes	E. sp.		A harpetid.	
Euloma	E. sp.	Araneograptus murrayi zone, ?Cymatograptus protobalticus zone, ?Baltograptus jacksoni zone	A small eulomid up to 3.8 centimetres (1.5 in) long. Found at intermediate depths in the transitional zone between shoreface and offshore sediments.	
Foulonia	F. peregrina	Araneograptus murrayi zone, ?Baltograptus jacksoni zone	A cheirurid.	
Geragnostus	G. sp.	Araneograptus murrayi zone, ?Baltograptus jacksoni zone	A very rare artiopodan arthropod in the order Agnostida, which is often considered a group of trilobites. Very small, at up to 0.9 centimetres (0.35 in) long.	
Harpides	H. sp.		A harpidid of questionable occurrence.	
Indiligens	I. sp.	Araneograptus murrayi zone	A ptychopariid known from multiple life stages, including mid-stage meraspids.	
Leptoplastides	L. salteri	Anisograptus matanensis zone, Rhabdinopora flabelliformis anglica zone	An olenid, the only diagnostic member of the family to be found in Africa. Previously misidentified as Beltella.	
Lichakephalus	L. stubbsi		A large lichakephalid.	
Megistaspis (Ekeraspis)	M. (E.) hammondi	Araneograptus murrayi zone	A large isoteline asaphid up to 28.5 centimetres (11.2 in) long, not counting a pronounced spine on the pygidium. Some specimens preserving gut traces and appendages showing new anatomical traits not seen in other trilobites. The cephalic appendages hosted long spines capable of combing through sediment for food. This species' feeding behavior may be responsible for Cruziana rugosa, a trace fossil common throughout Ordovician Gondwana. Known from multiple life stages, including mid to late meraspids.	
Neseuretus	N. cf. attenuatus	?Cymatograptus protobalticus zone, Baltograptus minutus zone	A calymenid found in particularly shallow sediments.	
Nileus	N. deynouxi	Araneograptus murrayi zone	A nileid known from multiple life stages, including late meraspids.	
Nobiliasaphus?	N.? sp.		A large asaphine asaphid up to 33 centimetres (13 in) long.	
Ogyginus	O. forteyi hammondi		A very large ogygiocaridinine asaphid, up to 45 centimetres (18 in) long.	
Ogyginus	O. sp.	Araneograptus murrayi zone	A very large ogygiocaridinine asaphid, up to 49.1 centimetres (19.3 in) long.	
Orometopus	O. sp.	Araneograptus murrayi zone	Known from multiple life stages, including early to late meraspids.	
Parabathycheilus	P. gallicus	Araneograptus murrayi zone, ?Cymatograptus protobalticus zone, ?Baltograptus jacksoni zone	A common bathycheilid without clear preferences for specific depths.	
Parvilichas	P. marochii	Upper Fezouata	A lichid.	
Pharostomina?	P.? sp.	Lower Fezouata	A pharostomatid.	
Platycoryphe	P. sp.	Upper Fezouata	A homalonotid.	
Platypeltoides	P. magrebiensis	Araneograptus murrayi zone	A large endemic nileid, up to 23 centimetres (9.1 in) long. Typically considered a single species. Known from multiple life stages, including early to late meraspids. Found in relatively shallow (lower nearshore) sediments.	
Pradoella	P. tazzarinensis	?Cymatograptus protobalticus zone, Baltograptus minutus zone	A calymenid.	
Prionocheilus	P. aff. languedocensis	Araneograptus murrayi zone, ?Baltograptus jacksoni zone	A pharostomatid found in relatively shallow (lower nearshore) sediments.	
Selenopeltis			An odontopleurid.	
Symphysurus	S. angustatus	Araneograptus murrayi zone, Upper Fezouata	A nileid found in relatively shallow (lower nearshore) sediments.	
Symphysurus	S. ebbestadi	Araneograptus murrayi zone	A common nileid with gregarious habits, often associated with graptolite debris at multiple water depths. Some specimens have been fossilized in the process of a mass moulting event, including some of the few known fossils of post-moult trilobites. Known from multiple life stages, including mid to late meraspids.	
Symphysurus	S. sicardi	?	A small nileid up to 4.5 centimetres (1.8 in) long	
Symphysurus	S. sp.	Araneograptus murrayi zone	Several additional Symphysurus species, one which reaches 7.5 centimetres (3.0 in) in length, and another reaching 4.2 centimetres (1.7 in).	
Toletanaspis	T. aff. borni	Araneograptus murrayi zone, ?Cymatograptus protobalticus zone, ?Baltograptus jacksoni zone	A dalmanitid without clear preferences for specific depths.	

=== Other arthropods ===
Many arthropods of the Fezouata Biota remain unnamed and undescribed. These include synziphosurines, xiphosurans (horseshoe crabs), chasmataspidids, phyllocarids, ostracods, a canadaspidid, a leanchoiliid, a cheloniellid ("Eoduslia"), a possible retifaciid, and a lepadomorph barnacle.

Other arthropods of the Fezouata Formation
Genus	Species	Stratigraphy	Notes	Images
Brachyaglaspis	B. singularis	Upper Fezouata (mid-Floian)	An aglaspidid with a very large cephalon, a short trunk, and no eyes.	
?Carcinosoma	?C. aurorae	Sagenograptus murrayi zone	The earliest known eurypterid. Known mostly from fragments.	
Enosiaspis	E. hrungnir	Araneograptus murrayi zone	An acercostracan marrellomorph with a shield-like dorsal carapace.	
"Furca"	"F. mauretanica"	Sagenograptus (Araneograptus) murrayi zone	A marrellid marrellomorph which has not been formally named or described in detail, but has been referred to by the informal unpublished name "Furca mauretanica". It had three pairs of cephalic appendages, 13 pairs of trunk appendages, and a cephalic shield with six large setae-bearing spines. Both adult and juvenile specimens are known of this species, including individuals caught in the act of moulting. The name "Furca mauretanica" is an informal nomen nudum for this species, first introduced in a PhD thesis. Multiple marrellid species may be present in the formation.	
Isoxys?	I? giganteus	Araneograptus murrayi zone	A bivalved arthropod possibly belonging to the genus Isoxys, if right, this interpretation would make I? giganteus the largest Isoxys species by far with the holotype valve being 334 mm long. It would also be the youngest Isoxys species, extending the stratigraphic range of isoxyids by approximately 20 million years and the first isoxyd of the Ordovician. Its very large size could reflect an adaptation to the cool water of the Fezouata Formation or/and a change in ecology.	
Setapedites	S. abundantis	Araneograptus murrayi zone	A small but abundant offacolid "synziphosurine" (early euchelicerate). Though most closely related to Dibasterium and Offacolus from the Silurian Herefordshire Lagerstätte, it also shows similarities to Habelia from the Cambian, and thus serves as a transitional form among Ordovician euchelicerate evolution.	
Tariccoia	T. tazagurtensis	Araneograptus murrayi zone	A liwiid nektaspid with a large cephalon and pygidium and sharply angled thorax tergites. One of the few liwiid fossils with soft tissue of the digestive system preserved.	
Thelxiope	T. sp.	Araneograptus murrayi zone	A mollisoniid, possibly related to chelicerates.	
Tremaglaspis	T. sp.		An aglaspidid, one of the first expectionally-preserved invertebrates found in the formation.	

=== Echinoderms ===
Many echinoderm species of the Fezouata Biota remain unnamed and undescribed. These include representatives of chauvelicystids, other cornutes, anomalacystitids, mitrocystitids, eocrinoids, rhenopyrgids, and somasteroids. Fezouata stylophoran fossils include soft tissue preserved among the skeletal elements, helping to unravel controversial details of their anatomy and ecology.

Specific echinoderm species may form dense fossil beds in some layers of the formation, a phenomenon which is particularly common in the mid-late Tremadocian (Araneograptus murrayi graptolite zone). Most echinoderm beds are dominated by only a few species, often representatives of stylophorans or the eocrinoid Rhopalocystis, with few other animal fossils. Through nearly the entire the formation, small Rhopalocystis species dominate "meadow"-like ecosystems in shallow waters impacted by storms. In the youngest layers of the formations, diploporites usurp this niche. Conversely, stylophorans are opportunistic colonizers of deeper low-oxygen seabeds in some intervals of the Araneograptus murrayi zone. Echinoderms are uncommon at intermediate depths, which have a higher proportion of brachiopod and trilobite fossils.

Nevertheless, there are quite a few exceptions which contradict these broad rules. Many sites record diverse deep-water ecosystems protected from both storms and insufficient oxygen. Numerous species of echinoderms and other invertebrates coexist at these localities, even if one echinoderm species outnumbers other fossils at any given time. Large Rhopalocystis species, Macrocystella, Plasiacystis, and Balantiocystis are common components of these assemblages.

Fezouata reconstructs the uneven nature of the Cambrian-Ordovician transition of echinoderm faunas. Cosmopolitan Late Cambrian hallmarks (such as cornute stylophorans) maintain their abundance in oxygen-poor areas, while newer groups (crinoids, diploporites, asterozoans) make inroads into more oxygenated waters. The rarity of carbonate platforms and hard substrates in the Gondwanan area delayed the diversification of crinoids and edrioasteroids in the region. This also provided more space for the establishment of a distinctive South Polar ecosystem dominated by eocrinoids, mitrates, solutans and, eventually, diploporites.

Echinoderms of the Fezouata Formation
Genus	Species	Stratigraphy	Notes	Images
Aethocrinus	A. cf. moorei	Araneograptus murrayi zone	A crinoid.	
Ampelocarpus	A. sp.	Araneograptus murrayi zone	A rare cornute.	
Amygdalotheca	A. griffei	Araneograptus murrayi zone	An uncommon cornute.	
Anatifopsis	A. escandrei	Hunnegraptus copuosus zone	A rare mitrate.	
Anatifopsis	A. trapeziiformis	Araneograptus murrayi zone, Hunnegraptus copiosus zone, ?Baltograptus jacksoni zone	A common mitrate.	
Anedriophus	A. moroccoensis	?Baltograptus jacksoni zone	An uncommon and endemic edrioasteroid.	
Argodiscus	A. espilezorum	?Cymatograptus protobalticus zone, ?Baltograptus jacksoni zone	An uncommon edrioasteroid.	
Aristocystites	A. cf. sinuosus	Araneograptus murrayi zone	A rare diploporite.	
Aspidocarpus	A. sp.	Araneograptus murrayi zone	A rare mitrate.	
Balanocystites	B. primus	?Baltograptus jacksoni zone	A common mitrate.	
Balantiocystis	B. regnelli	Araneograptus murrayi zone, ?Cymatograptus protobalticus zone, ?Baltograptus jacksoni zone	A common eocrinoid. The dominant echinoderm at sites Z-F26 and Z-F23, which preserve diverse fossil assemblages buried in calm-water fine-grained siltstone of the ?Cymatograptus protobalticus zone. Also abundant in higher-energy deposits of the ?Baltograptus jacksoni zone.	
Bohemiaecystis	B. sp.	Araneograptus murrayi zone	A locally abundant cornute with a large sample size, allowing for a reconstruction of decay pathways in stylophoran soft tissue and skeletal material.	
Chauvelicystis	C. spinosa	Araneograptus murrayi zone	A rare cornute.	
Chauvelicystis	C. ubaghsi	Araneograptus murrayi zone	An uncommon cornute.	
Chauvelicystis	C. vizcainoi	Araneograptus murrayi zone	A rare cornute.	
Chinianocarpos	C. sp.	"Azygograptus interval"	An uncommon mitrate.	
Flabellicarpus	F. rushtoni	Araneograptus murrayi zone	A rare cornute.	
Galliaecystis	G. ubaghsi	Araneograptus murrayi zone	A rare cornute.	
Galliaecystis	G. sp.	Araneograptus murrayi zone	An uncommon cornute.	
Hanusia	H. sp.	Araneograptus murrayi zone	An uncommon cornute.	
Iocrinus	I. sp.	?Cymatograptus protobalticus zone	A rare disparid crinoid.	
Lagnocystis	L. pyramidalis	Araneograptus murrayi zone	A rare mitrate.	
Lingulocystis	L. aff. deani	?Cymatograptus protobalticus zone, ?Baltograptus jacksoni zone	A rare eocrinoid.	
Lingulocystis	L. elongata	Araneograptus murrayi zone, ?Baltograptus jacksoni zone	A rare eocrinoid.	
Macrocystella	M. bohemica	Araneograptus murrayi zone, ?Baltograptus jacksoni zone	A common glyptocystitid rhombiferan. Crushed but complete skeletons of this species are abundant at Oued Beni Zoli locality Z-F5, a site preserving a diverse assemblage of storm-influenced siltstone in the Araneograptus murrayi zone.	
Nanocarpus	N. cf. dolambii	Araneograptus murrayi zone	A rare cornute.	
Nimchacystis	N. agterbosi	Araneograptus murrayi zone	An uncommon minervaecystid solutan.	
Paleosphaeronites?	P.? prokopi	Araneograptus murrayi zone, ?Baltograptus jacksoni zone	A rare diploporite.	
cf. Pareocrinus		Araneograptus murrayi zone, ?Cymatograptus protobalticus zone	An uncommon eocrinoid.	
Peltocystis	P. cornuta	Araneograptus murrayi zone	An uncommon mitrate.	
Plasiacystis	P. mobilis	Araneograptus murrayi zone up to the Baltograptus minutus zone	A common minervaecystid solutan. Paddles of this species are abundant at sites Z-F13c and Z-F24, a pair of diverse faunal assemblages emplaced in sandy storm deposits of the Hunnegraptus copuosus zone.	
Procothurnocystis	P. sp.	Araneograptus murrayi zone	A common cornute.	
Prokopicystis	P. sp.	Araneograptus murrayi zone	A rare cornute.	
Ramseyocrinus	R. sp.	?Cymatograptus protobalticus zone, ?Baltograptus jacksoni zone	A rare disparid crinoid.	
Rhopalocystis	R. destombesi	Aorograptus victoriae zone, Araneograptus murrayi zone, Hunnegraptus copiosus zone, ?Baltograptus jacksoni zone	A common and endemic eocrinoid which can be abundant in certain layers. It is a small but robust species often found in densely jumbled fossiliferous lenses. These lenses are interpreted as debris from shallow-water "meadows", uprooted and washed down into deeper areas by storms.	
Rhopalocystis	R. fraga	Araneograptus murrayi zone	A rare and endemic eocrinoid, similar to R. destombesi in form and preservation style.	
Rhopalocystis	R. grandis	Araneograptus murrayi zone	A rare and endemic eocrinoid, similar to R. havliceki in form and preservation style.	
Rhopalocystis	R. havliceki	Araneograptus murrayi zone	A common and endemic eocrinoid. It is a large but fragile species which is often found disarticulated in siltstone beds. Unlike R. destombesi, it was likely a deep-water specialist buried in place.	
Rhopalocystis	R. zagoraensis	Araneograptus murrayi zone, Hunnegraptus copiosus zone	A common and endemic eocrinoid, similar to R. destombesi in form and preservation style.	
Thoralicystis	T. sp.	Araneograptus murrayi zone	A common cornute.	
Thoralicystis	T. zagoraensis	?Baltograptus jacksoni zone	A rare cornute.	
Villebrunaster	V. fezouatensis	Araneograptus murrayi zone	A chinianasterid somasteroid, a sea star-like echinoderm with a broad pentagonal body. Originally described in a new genus, Cantabrigiaster, but subsequently referred to Villebrunaster.	
Vizcainocarpus	V. sp.	Araneograptus murrayi zone	A rare mitrate.	

=== Molluscs ===
Molluscs of the Fezouata Formation
Genus	Species	Stratigraphy	Notes	Images
Alococoncha?	A.? sp.	"Azygograptus interval"	A rare ctenodontid protobranch bivalve. It was likely an infaunal deposit feeder.	
Babinka	B. prima	?Cymatograptus protobalticus zone, ?Baltograptus jacksoni zone, "Azygograptus interval"	A common bivalve, tentatively identified as one of the oldest lucinids (hatchet shells). It was likely an infaunal filter-feeder capable of rapid vertical movement within sediment. Like modern lucinids, it may have been a specialist in oxygen-poor environments thanks to endosymbiotic sulfide-oxidizing bacteria.	
Bactroceras	B. sp.	"late early to mid Floian"	A very rare baltoceratid "nautiloid" cephalopod in the order Orthocerida.	
Bathmoceras	B. australe	"late early to mid Floian"	A very rare bathmoceratid "nautiloid" cephalopod in the order Ellesmerocerida.	
Bathmoceras	B. taichoutense	"late early to mid Floian"	A very rare bathmoceratid "nautiloid" cephalopod in the order Ellesmerocerida.	
Calvapilosa	C. kroegeri	Araneograptus murrayi zone	A mollusc in the group Sachitida (the proposed clade containing living aculiferans and their extinct stem group relatives such as halkieriids). It had a flattened body with an extensive radula, a mantle covered in bristle-like sclerites, and a single flat calcareous shell on the head.	
Carcassonnella	C. courtessolei	?Cymatograptus protobalticus zone, ?Baltograptus jacksoni zone	A common tergomyan monoplacophoran.	
Carcassonnella	C. sp.	Araneograptus murrayi zone, ?Cymatograptus protobalticus zone?	A common tergomyan monoplacophoran known from tiny juveniles which died in relatively deep, oxygen-poor waters.	
Carcassonnella	C. vizcainoi	?Cymatograptus protobalticus zone	A common tergomyan monoplacophoran.	
Cardiolaria?		"Azygograptus interval"	A rare afghanodesmatid protobranch bivalve. It may have been an infaunal filter-feeder.	
Cienagomya?	C.? sp.	?Cymatograptus protobalticus zone,	A very rare actinodontid bivalve in the family Intihuarellidae. It was likely an infaunal filter-feeder.	
Coxiconchia	C. guiraudi	?Cymatograptus protobalticus zone, "Azygograptus interval"	A common bivalve, tentatively identified as one of the oldest lucinids (hatchet shells). It was likely an infaunal filter-feeder capable of rapid vertical movement within sediment. Like modern lucinids, it may have been a specialist in oxygen-poor environments thanks to endosymbiotic sulfide-oxidizing bacteria.	
Destombesiceras	D. zagorense	"late early to mid Floian"	An apicrinoceratid "nautiloid" cephalopod in the order Discosorida. The least rare nautiloid found in the formation, though still uncommon.	
Ekaterodonta	E. courtessolei	?Cymatograptus protobalticus zone, ?Baltograptus jacksoni zone	A rare afghanodesmatid protobranch bivalve. It was likely an infaunal deposit feeder.	
Glyptarca	G. sp.	?Cymatograptus protobalticus zone,	A rare arcid bivalve. It was likely an infaunal filter-feeder.	
Lesueurilla	L. prima	?Cymatograptus protobalticus zone, ?Baltograptus jacksoni zone, Baltograptus minutus zone	A lesuerillid gastropod.	
Pelecyogyra	P. fezouataensis	Araneograptus murrayi zone	A common onychochilid paragastropod, an extinct group of gastropod-like molluscs with asymmetrically coiled shells. It was gregarious and primarily found in shallow oxygenated waters represented at the Oued Beni Zoli locality.	
Polymeres	P. sp.	"late early to mid Floian"	A rare polymerid "nautiloid" cephalopod in the order Dissidocerida.	
Praenucula?	P.? sp.	?Cymatograptus protobalticus zone,	A very rare praenuculid protobranch bivalve known from a single specimen. It was likely an infaunal deposit feeder.	
Protocyptendoceras	P. longicameratum	"late early to mid Floian"	A very rare protocameroceratid "nautiloid" cephalopod in the order Endocerida.	
Redonia	R. michelae	?Cymatograptus protobalticus zone, ?Baltograptus jacksoni zone, "Azygograptus interval"	A very common actinodontid bivalve in the family Redoniidae. It was likely a shallowly infaunal filter-feeder capable of rapid reburial, with the majority of the shell embedded in sediment.	
Ribeiria	R. sp.	Upper Fezouata	A rostroconch.	
Rioceras	R. sp.	"late early to mid Floian"	A very rare rioceratid "nautiloid" cephalopod in the order Ellesmerocerida.	
Sinuites	S. sp.	?Baltograptus jacksoni zone	A rare bellerophontoid gastropod.	
Thoralispira	T. laevis	?Baltograptus jacksoni zone	A common tergomyan monoplacophoran.	

=== Conodonts ===
Conodonts from the Fezouata Formation are mostly coniform elements of Early Ordovician species. Overall diversity is rather low, and species which were common in temperate and tropical seas are apparently absent. The Fezouata Formation appears to be an exemplar of the "subpolar domain", an assemblage of cold-water coastal conodonts native to the South Polar region of the Early Ordovician. Similar conodont faunas are known from Early Ordovician deposits in Central Europe, which was also located near the South Pole. The "subpolar domain" survived into the Middle Ordovician and expanded into areas now found in the Middle East.

Fezouata conodonts are difficult to correlate to biostratigraphic systems in nearby temperate regions such as Baltica. Most species appear to correspond to the time interval stretching from the Oelandodus elongatus-Acodus deltatus subzone of the Paroistodus proteus zone (uppermost Tremadocian) up through the Prioniodus oepiki zone (lower Floian).

Conodonts of the Fezouata Formation
Genus	Species	Notes	Images
Acodus	A. deltatus	An acodontid prioniodontid	
Cornuodus	C. longibasis	A strachanognathid	
Drepanodus	D. arcuatus	A drepanoistodontid or protopanderodontid	
Drepanoistodus	D. cf. forceps	A drepanoistodontid	
Paltodus	P. cf. inaequalis	A drepanoistodontid	
Paltodus	P. spp.	A drepanoistodontid	
Parapaltodus	P. cf. flexuosus	An acanthodontid	
Parapaltodus	P. aff. simplicissimus	An acanthodontid	
Paroistodus	P. cf. parallellus	A drepanoistodontid	
Paroistodus	P. proteus	A drepanoistodontid	
Periodon	P. cf. primus	A periodontid ozarkodinid	
Periodon	P. cf. selenopsis	A periodontid ozarkodinid	
Prioniodus	P. cf. gilberti	A balognathid prioniodontid	
Protopanderodus	P. cf. leonardii	A protopanderodontid	
Scalpellodus	S. aff. gracilis	An acanthodontid	
Scolopodus	S. aff. krummi	A protopanderodontid	
Semiacontiodus	S. cf. cornuformis	A protopanderodontid	
Semiacontiodus	S. sp.	A protopanderodontid	
Stolodus	S. cf. stola	A belodellid	
Tripodus	T. aff. laevis	An acodontid	
Tripodus	T. cf. sweeti	An acodontid	

=== Graptolites ===
Graptolites in the Fezouata Formation are important for biostratigraphic correlation to other regions. Most species found in the formation are assigned to planktic (graptoloid) groups, though some mesh-shaped taxa (like Araneograptus and Rhabdinopora) may have been transitional between sessile (dendroid) graptolites and free-floating graptoloids. Sessile forms, such as Didymograptus, Dictyonema, Webbyites, and rhabdopleurids, are also present but much more rare.

The graptolites of the Fezouata Formation are distributed over 10 biozones. In order, these zones are: the Anisograptus matanensis zone (1), Rhabdinopora flabelliformis anglica zone (2), "Adelograptus" tenellus zone (3), Aorograptus victoriae zone (4), Araneograptus murrayi zone (5), Hunnegraptus copiosus zone (6), ?Cymatograptus protobalticus zone (7), ?Baltograptus jacksoni zone (8), Baltograptus minutus zone (9), and the "Azygograptus interval" (10). Not all of the index taxa which these zones are named for are known from the Fezouata Formation. The Tremadocian-Floian boundary is approximately at the level between the Hunnegraptus copiosus and ?Cymatograptus probalticus zones.

The most well-preserved fossils in the Fezouata Formation generally come from strata of the late Tremadocian (late Araneograptus murrayi zone and early Hunnegraptus copiosus zone) and the mid-late Floian (late Baltograptus minutus zone and early "Azygograptus interval").

Graptolites of the Fezouata Formation
Genus	Species	Graptolite biozone	Notes	Images
"Adelograptus"	"A." tenellus	"Adelograptus" tenellus zone	A multiramous anisograptid (basal graptoloid).	
Ancoragraptus	A. bulmani	Aorograptus victoriae zone	A "psigraptid"-type anisograptid, with a small number of reclined stipes.	
Anisograptus	A. cf. matanensis	Anisograptus matanensis zone	A multiramous anisograptid. Very rare, only a single fossil may indicate its presence.	
Araneograptus	A. murrayi	Araneograptus murrayi zone	A common basal graptoloid with a mesh-like conical colony form. Potentially a species of Sagenograptus.	
Azygograptus	A. eivionicus	"Azygograptus interval"	A rare "azygograptid", a unique type of early graptoloid with a single uniserial stipe, convergently similar to the Silurian-Devonian monograptids.	
Baltograptus	B. deflexus	Baltograptus minutus zone	A didymograptid graptoloid, with two subhorizontal to pendent stipes.	
Baltograptus	?B. jacksoni	?Baltograptus jacksoni zone	A didymograptid graptoloid, with two subhorizontal to pendent stipes.	
Baltograptus	?B. kurcki	Baltograptus minutus zone	A didymograptid graptoloid, with two subhorizontal to pendent stipes.	
Baltograptus	B. minutus	Baltograptus minutus zone	A didymograptid graptoloid, with two subhorizontal to pendent stipes.	
Choristograptus	C. louai	Aorograptus victoriae zone	A small and rare anisograptid.	
Clonograptus	C. multiplex	?Cymatograptus protobalticus zone, ?Baltograptus jacksoni zone	A large and common multiramous dichograptid.	
Clonograptus	C. rigidus	Araneograptus murrayi zone, Hunnegraptus copiosus zone	A large and common multiramous dichograptid.	
?Cymatograptus	?C. protobalticus	?Cymatograptus protobalticus zone	A rare didymograptid.	
"Didymograptus"	"D." sp.	Araneograptus murrayi zone, Hunnegraptus copiosus zone	A rare didymograptid.	
Expansograptus	E. sp.	?Baltograptus jacksoni zone	A rare didymograptid with two horizontal stipes.	
Holograptus	H. sp.	Baltograptus minutus zone	A multiramous dichograptid.	
Hunnegraptus	H. copiosus	Hunnegraptus copiosus zone	A multiramous anisograptid.	
"Kiaerograptus"	"K." supremus	Araneograptus murrayi zone, Hunnegraptus copiosus zone	A "psigraptid"-type anisograptid, with a small number of reclined stipes.	
Paradelograptus	P. norvegicus	Araneograptus murrayi zone, Hunnegraptus copiosus zone	A multiramous sigmagraptid graptoloid.	
Paradelograptus	P. tenuis	Araneograptus murrayi zone	A multiramous sigmagraptid graptoloid.	
Paratemnograptus	P. magnificus	Araneograptus murrayi zone, Hunnegraptus copiosus zone	A large and common multiramous anisograptid.	
Rhabdinopora	R. flabelliformis anglica	Rhabdinopora flabelliformis anglica zone	A basal graptoloid with a mesh-like conical colony form transitional between dendroids (such as Dictyonema) and early graptoloids such as anisograptids.	
Rhabdinopora	R. flabelliformis canadensis	Anisograptus matanensis zone	A basal graptoloid with a mesh-like conical colony form transitional between dendroids (such as Dictyonema) and early graptoloids such as anisograptids.	
Rhabdinopora	R. flabelliformis flabelliformis	Anisograptus matanensis zone, Rhabdinopora flabelliformis anglica zone	A basal graptoloid with a mesh-like conical colony form transitional between dendroids (such as Dictyonema) and early graptoloids such as anisograptids.	
Rhabdinopora	R. flabelliformis socialis	Anisograptus matanensis zone	A basal graptoloid with a mesh-like conical colony form transitional between dendroids (such as Dictyonema) and early graptoloids such as anisograptids.	
indeterminate rhabdopleurid		Sagenopterus (Araneograptus) murrayi zone	Tubes of Rhabdopleura-like pterobranchs have been found growing around the edge of a cephalopod shell, one of the few examples of hard substrate to be found in the formation. This association is similar to the ecology reported for Yuknessia from the Burgess Shale.	
Schizograptus	?S. sp.	Baltograptus minutus zone	A common multiramous dichograptid, also sometimes classified as Holograptus.	
"Tetragraptus"	"T. bulmani"	Araneograptus murrayi zone	A common tetragraptid graptoloid with two to four reclined to pendent stipes.	
"Tetragraptus"	Other Tetragraptus species	Araneograptus murrayi zone, ?Baltograptus jacksoni zone	A common tetragraptid graptoloid with two to four reclined to pendent stipes.	
Webbyites	W. felix	"probable late Tremadocian"	An enigmatic feather-shaped organism identified as a sessile graptolite.	

=== Brachiopods ===
Brachiopods of the Fezouata Formation
Genus	Species	Stratigraphy	Notes	Images
Acrothele	A. sp.	Lower Fezouata	An acrothelid linguliform.	
Angusticardinia	A. sp.	Upper Fezouata	An angusticardiniid orthid.	
Lingula	L. salteri	Upper Fezouata	A lingulid linguliform.	
Orbithele	O. vana	Upper Fezouata	An acrothelid linguliform.	
Paurorthis	P. tadristensis	Upper Fezouata	A paurorthid orthid.	
Plectorthis	P. simplex	Lower Fezouata	A plectorthid orthid.	
Ranorthis	R. fasciata	Lower and Upper Fezouata	A ranorthid orthid.	
Tarfaya	T. marocana	Upper Fezouata	A heterorthid orthid.	

=== Sponges ===
Many sponges from the Fezouata biota remain unnamed, including protomonaxonid demosponges (leptomitids, "choiids", hamptoniids, piraniids), a hazeliid, reticulosan hexactinellids (asthenospongiids, etc.), and other indeterminate forms. Many of the sponges have affinities with Cambrian taxa common in Burgess Shale-type faunas. Though at least 27 sponge species have been recorded in the biota, nearly all occurrences are monospecific death assemblages, with the exception of Pirania auraeum, which has a broader and less dense distribution in the formation. Periodic unstable seafloor conditions (potentially related to seasonal disruptions) would have favored species-poor colonization events over short time periods, rather than a stable and diverse equilibrium.

This is unusual relative to other Ordovician sponge ecosystems, such as the Builth Inlier of Wales. Another difference is how Fezouata's sponge fauna consists mostly of protomonaxonids, with a few reticulosans occupying course-grained shallow seabeds. Conversely, in Wales, there is a clear succession of diverse and sturdy lithistids and thick-walled hexactinellids in shallow reefs and other energetic areas, with protomonaxonids at intermediate depths, and reticulosans in the deepest and calmest environments.

Sponges of the Fezouata Formation
Genus	Species	Stratigraphy	Notes	Images
Choia	C. sp.	Upper Fezouata	A "choiid".	
Choiaella	C. sp.		A "choiid".	
Hamptonia	H. sp.		A hamptoniid.	
'Hamptonia'	'H.' christi	Upper Fezouata	An indeterminate protomonaxonid. Previously considered a species of Hamptonia, but likely belongs to a new genus.	
Pirania	P. auraeum	Upper Fezouata	A piraniid.	
Valospongia?	V.? sp.		A reticulosan.	

=== Other animals ===
Many animals from the Fezouata biota remain unnamed and undescribed, including bryozoans, chordate "dermal plates", annelid worms, priapulids, problematica, and at least five new species of lobopod, including an armored form.

Other animals of the Fezouata Formation
Genus	Species	Stratigraphy	Notes	Images
Archaeoconularia	A. sp.	Lower and Upper Fezouata	A common large conulariid, up to 50 centimetres (20 in) tall.	
Cavernolites	C. senex	Upper Fezouata	A hyolith.	
Elegantilites	E. sp.	Upper Fezouata	A hyolith.	
Eoconularia	E. sp.	Lower and Upper Fezouata	An abundant small conulariid (less than 5 centimetres (2.0 in) tall). Frequently found attached to brachiopods or even other conulariids.	
Gamalites?	G.? sp.	Upper Fezouata	A hyolith.	
Gompholites	G. sp.	Upper Fezouata	A hyolith.	
Nephrotheca	N. sp.	Upper Fezouata	A hyolith.	
Palaeoscolex?	P.? tenensis	Araneograptus murrayi zone	A palaeoscolecid worm. Though most palaeoscolecids are inferred to be burrowing carnivores, remains from the Fezouata Formation are more consistent with an opportunistic epibenthic lifestyle, patrolling for organic matter on the surface of the seabed.	
Pauxillites	P. thaddei	Upper Fezouata	A medium-sized pauxillitid hyolith.	
Plumulites	P. bengtsoni	Araneograptus murrayi zone	A machaeridian (armored annelid worm). This species is the only machaeridian known to preserve soft tissue and jaw material, helping to demonstrate their affinities with aphroditiform polychaetes (scaleworms and kin).	
Sphenothallus	S. spp.	Lower and Upper Fezouata	A tubular organism likely closely related to conulariids.	

=== Other organisms ===
Chitinozoans, acritarchs, and algae have been recorded from the formation.
