= Hamptoniella =

Hamptoniella Temporal range: Burgess Shale

Scientific classification
- Kingdom: Animalia
- Phylum: Porifera
- Class: Demospongiae
- Order: †Protomonaxonida
- Family: †Hamptoniidae
- Genus: †Hamptoniella; Rigby & Collins, 2004

Species
- Hamptoniella foliata Rigby & Collins, 2004; Hamptoniella hirsuta Rigby & Collins, 2004

Extinct genus of sponges

Hamptoniella is an extinct genus of sponges known from the Middle Cambrian Burgess Shale.
