= Ulospongiella =

Ulospongiella Temporal range: Burgess Shale

Scientific classification
- Kingdom: Animalia
- Phylum: Porifera
- Class: Demospongiae
- Order: †Protomonaxonida
- Genus: †Ulospongiella; Rigby & Collins, 2004
- Species: †U. ancyla

Binomial name
- †Ulospongiella ancyla Rigby & Collins, 2004

Extinct genus of sponges

Ulospongiella is a genus of sponge known only from the Burgess Shale deposit. It contains only one species, Ulospongiella ancyla.

The generic name is derived from the Greek words oulus ("wooly" or "curly") and spongia ("sponge"), referring to the curled or curved spicules forming the skeleton. The specific name, ancyla, is from the Greek ankylos ("bent" or "hooked"), also referring to the curved spicules.
