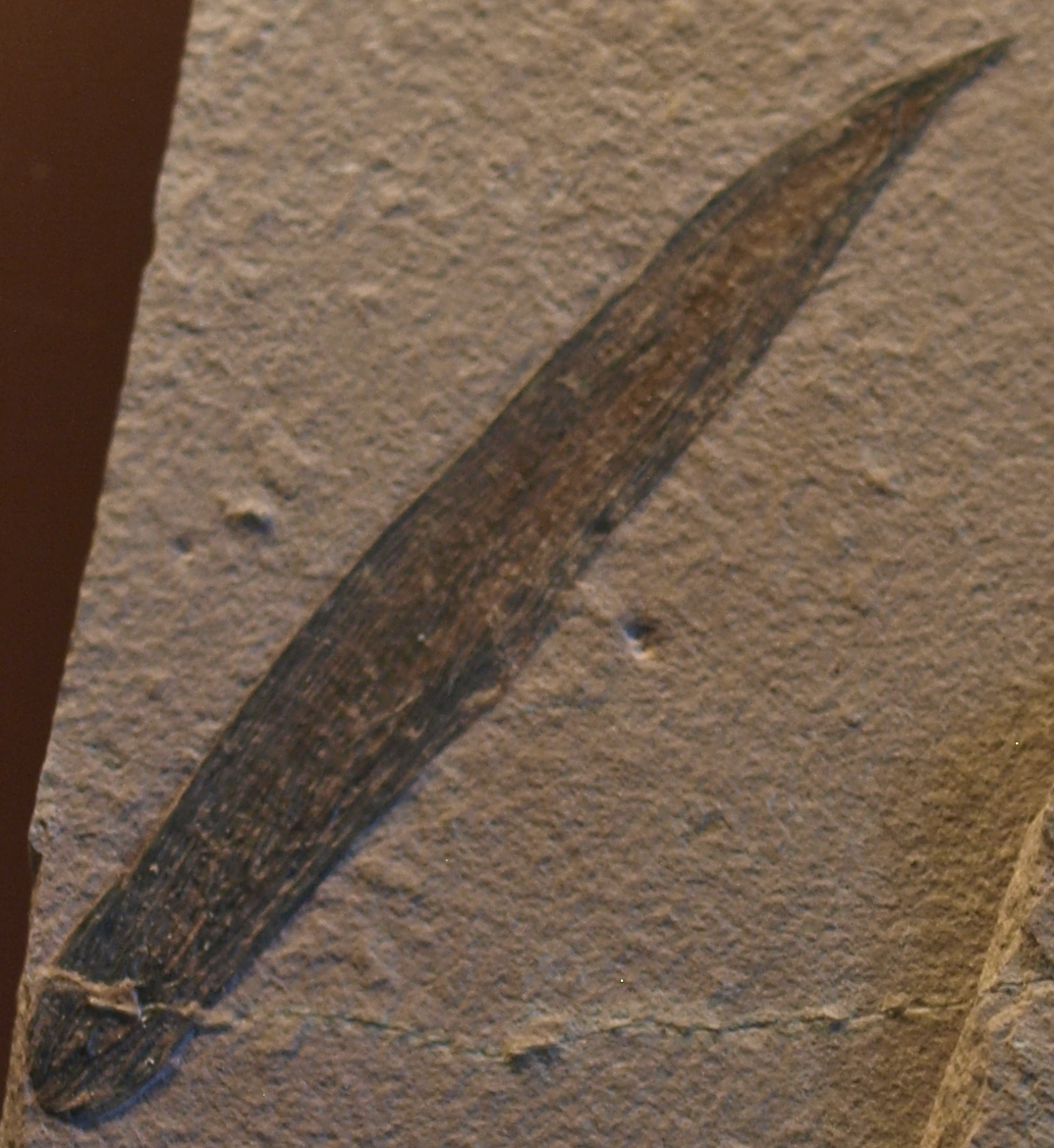
- Fossil detail of a Halichondrites elissa, on display at the Naturhistorisches Museum, Vienna.

Scientific classification
- Domain: Eukaryota
- Kingdom: Animalia
- Phylum: Porifera
- Class: Demospongiae
- Order: †Protomonaxonida
- Family: †Halichondritidae
- Genus: †Halichondrites; Dawson, 1889

Species
- Halichondrites confusus Dawson, 1889; Halichondrites elissa Walcott, 1920; Halichondrites? actiniformis Howell & Landes, 1936; Halichondrites? robustus Howell & Landes, 1936

= Halichondrites =

Halichondrites Temporal range: Middle Cambrian

Genus of sponges

Halichondrites, sometimes mis-spelt Halicondrites is an extinct genus of sea sponge known from the Middle Cambrian Burgess Shale. 7 specimens of Halichondrites are known from the Greater Phyllopod bed, where they comprise < 0.1% of the community.

== Taxonomy and species ==
The genus Halichondrites was erected by John William Dawson in 1889, who described the species Halichondrites confusus from the Ordovician of Quebec at Little Métis.

In 1920, Charles Doolittle Walcott, considering H. confusus to be inadequately described, himself described Halichondrites elissa from the Middle Cambrian Burgess Shale, placing it as the type species of the genus.

In 1936, Howell & Landes described and provisionally placed in the genus two further species from the Lower Ordovician of Wisconsin, Halichondrites? actiniformis and Halichondrites? robustus.

Another species, "Halichondrites graphitiferus", was described by George Frederick Matthew in 1890 from the Precambrian of Saint John, New Brunswick. However, the organic nature of this species has been questioned; according to Miller (1987), who examined the holotype, the "spicules" described by Matthew are more likely a combination of scratches and cleavage on graphite.
