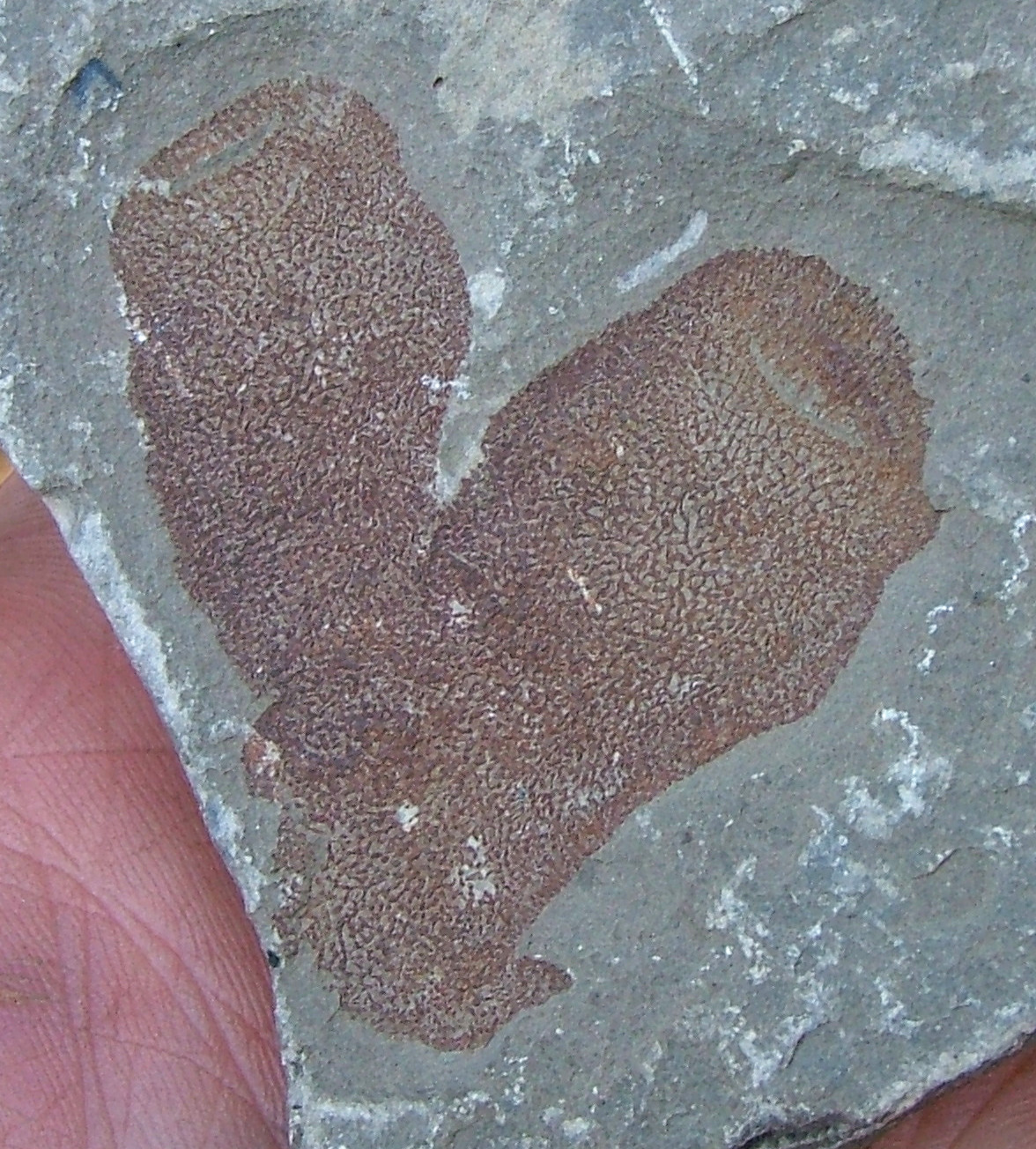
- A specimen of Hazelia at the Mount Stephen Trilobite Beds

Scientific classification
- Domain: Eukaryota
- Kingdom: Animalia
- Phylum: Porifera
- Class: Demospongiae
- Order: †Protomonaxonida
- Family: †Hazeliidae
- Genus: †Hazelia; Walcott, 1920

Species
- H. palmata Walcott, 1920 (type); H. conferta Walcott, 1920; H. crateria Rigby, 1986; H. delicatula Walcott, 1920; H. dignata (Walcott, 1920) Rigby & Collins, 2004; H. grandis Walcott, 1920; H. luteria Rigby, 1986; H. obscura Walcott, 1920; H. lobata Rigby & Collins, 2004

= Hazelia =

Hazelia Temporal range: Chengjiang–Middle Ordovician

Extinct genus of sponges

Hazelia is a genus of spicular Cambrian demosponge known from the Burgess Shale, the Marjum formation of Utah, and possibly Chengjiang. It was described by Charles Walcott in 1920.

Its tracts are mainly radial and anastomose to form an irregular skeleton. Its oxeas form a fine net in the skin of the sponge.
