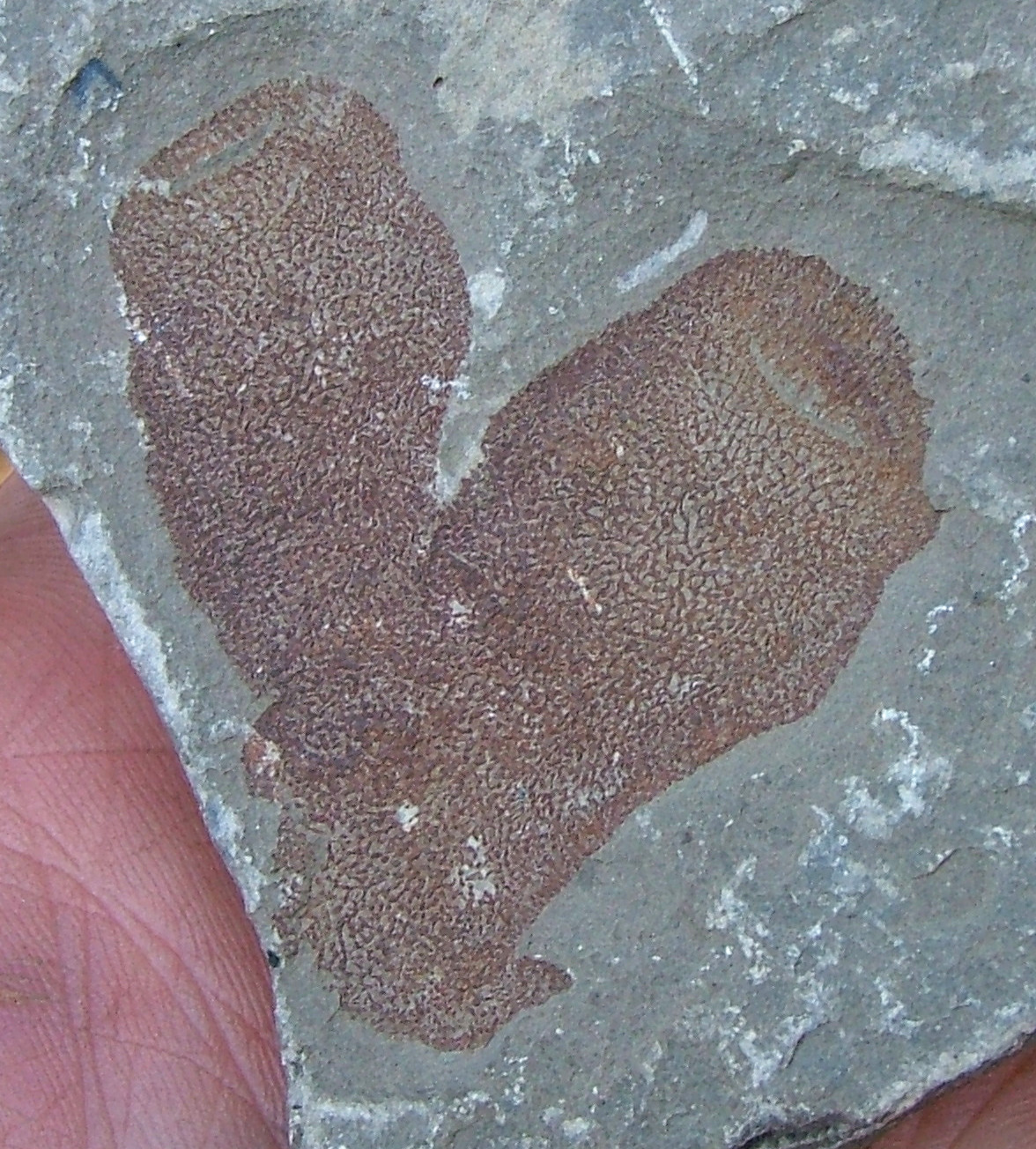
- A specimen of Hazelia at the Mount Stephen Trilobite Beds

Scientific classification
- Kingdom: Animalia
- Phylum: Porifera
- Class: Demospongiae
- Order: †Protomonaxonida
- Family: †Hazeliidae; Walcott, 1920

Genera
- Falospongia Rigby, 1986; Hazelia Walcott, 1920; Crumillospongia Rigby, 1986

= Hazeliidae =

Hazeliidae Temporal range: Chengjiang–Middle Ordovician

Extinct family of sponges

Hazeliidae is an extinct family of spicular Cambrian sea sponges known from the Burgess Shale, the Marjum Formation of Utah, and possibly Chengjiang. It was described by Charles Walcott in 1920.
