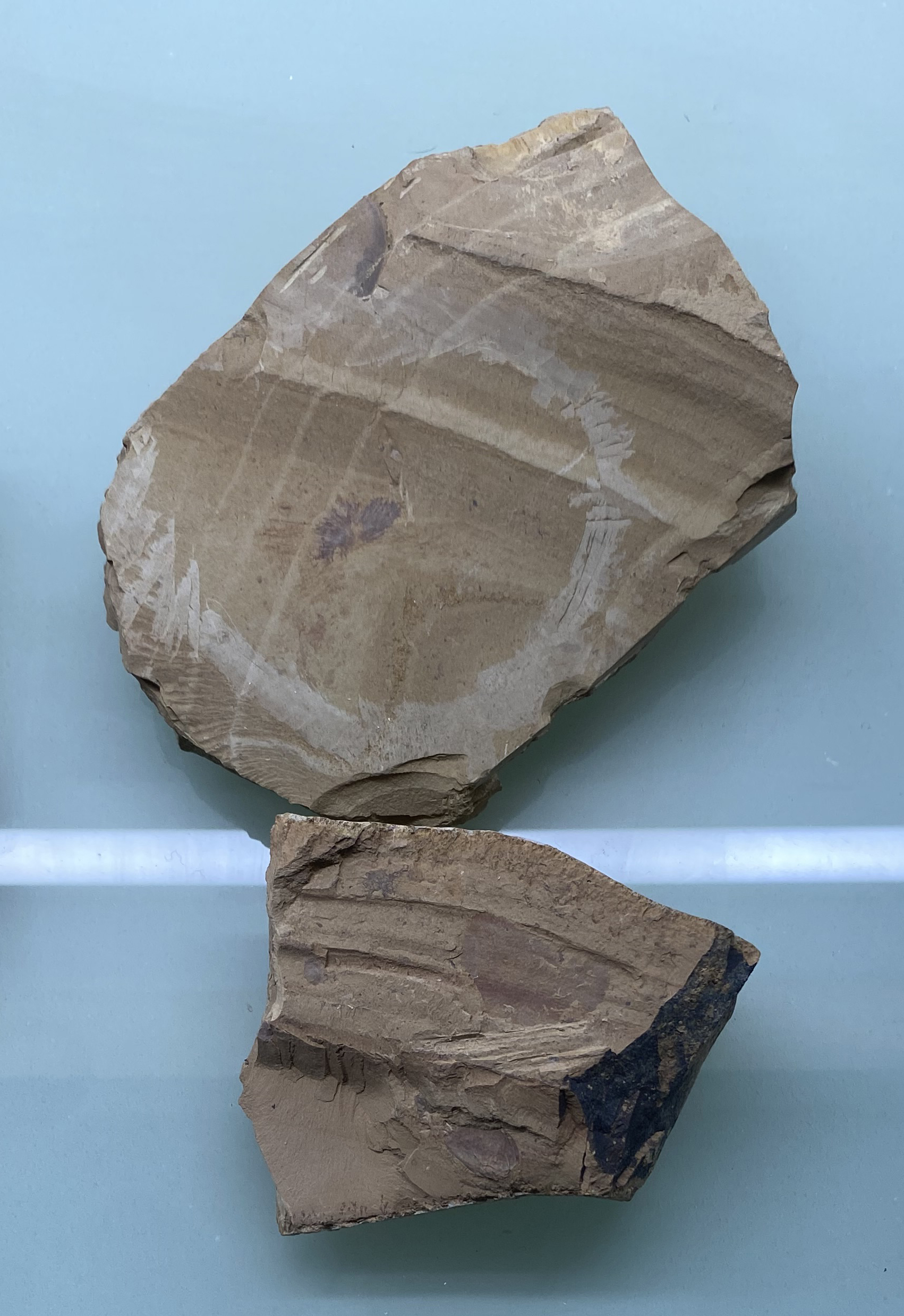
- Fossil of Hamptonia chengjiangensis in Yuxi Museum

Scientific classification
- Kingdom: Animalia
- Phylum: Porifera
- Class: Demospongiae
- Order: †Protomonaxonida
- Family: †Hamptoniidae
- Genus: †Hamptonia; Walcott, 1920

Type species
- Hamptonia bowerbanki Walcott, 1920s

Species
- Hamptonia bowerbanki Walcott, 1920; Hamptonia christi Botting, 2007; Hamptonia elongata Rigby & Collins, 2004; Hamptonia jianhensis Wang et al., 2019; Hamptonia limatula Botting & Peel, 2016; Hamptonia parva Rigby et al., 2010

= Hamptonia =

Hamptonia Temporal range: Burgess Shale–Lower Ordovician

Extinct genus of sponges

Hamptonia is an extinct genus of sea sponge known from the Middle Cambrian Burgess Shale and the Lower Ordovician Fezouata formation. It was first described in 1920 by Charles Doolittle Walcott. 48 specimens of Hamptonia are known from the Greater Phyllopod bed, where they comprise < 0.1% of the community.
