= Wapkia =

Wapkia Temporal range: Middle Cambrian

Scientific classification
- Kingdom: Animalia
- Phylum: Porifera
- Class: Demospongiae
- Order: †Protomonaxonida
- Family: †Wapkiidae
- Genus: †Wapkia; Walcott, 1920

Species
- Wapkia grandis Walcott, 1920; Wapkia elongata Rigby & Collins, 2004

Extinct genus of sponges

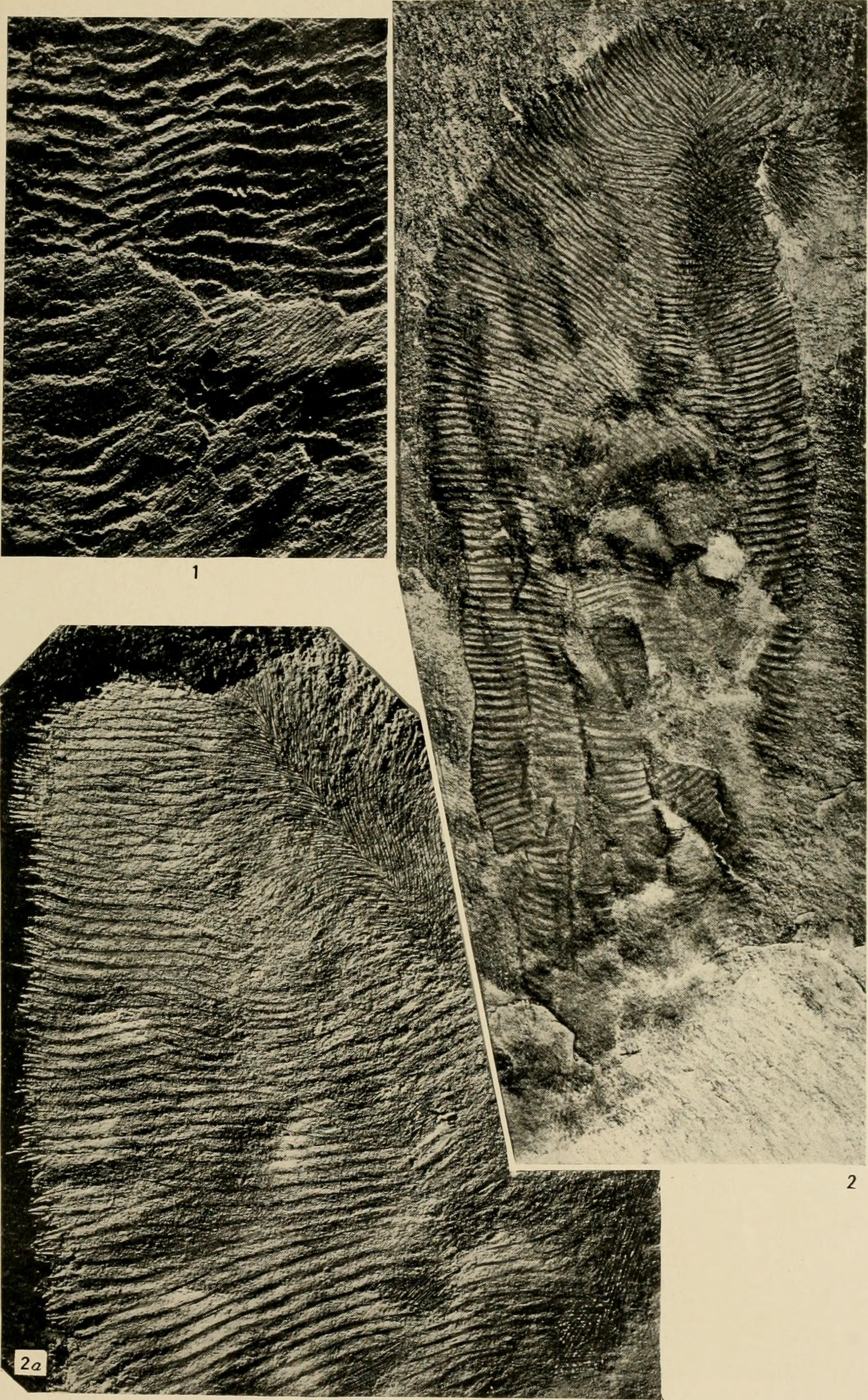
Wapkia Grandis fossils

Wapkia is an extinct genus of sea sponge with radial sclerites, known from the Middle Cambrian Burgess Shale. It was first described in 1920 by Charles Doolittle Walcott. 32 specimens of Wapkia are known from the Greater Phyllopod bed, where they comprise 0.06% of the community.
