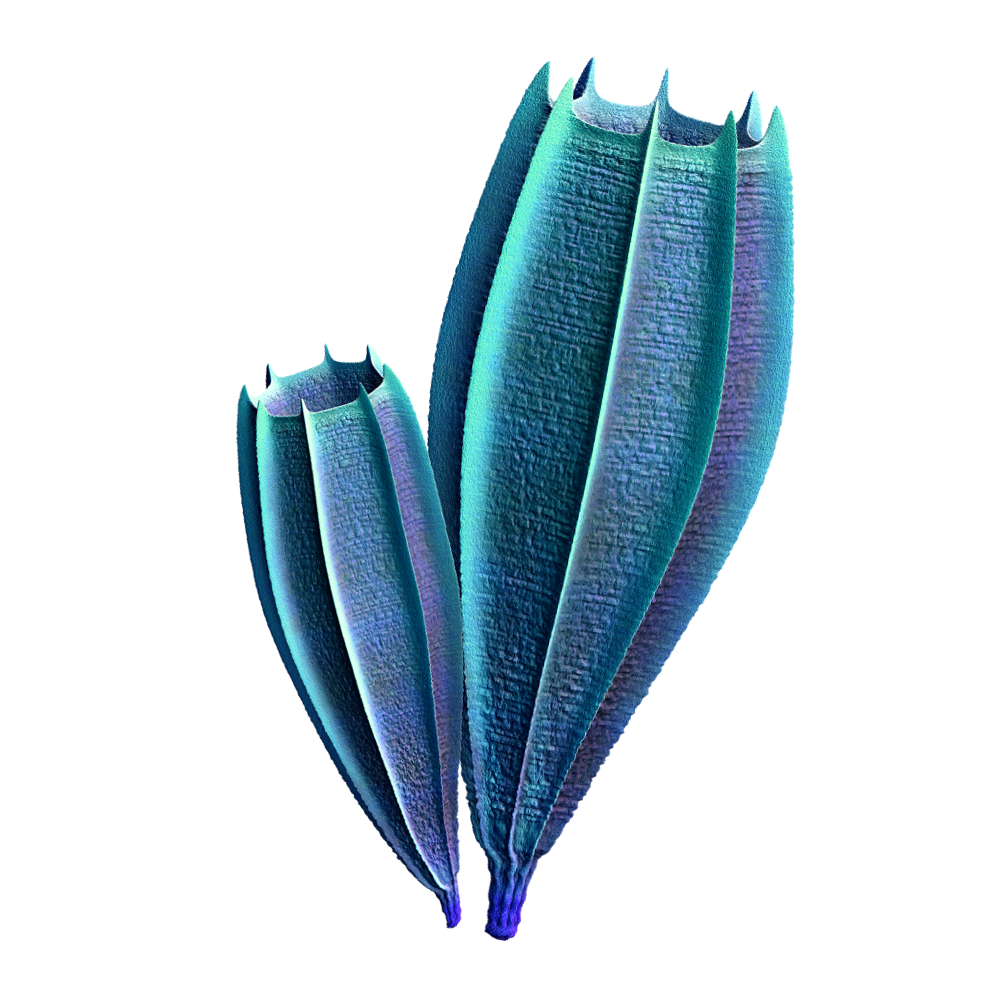
- Reconstruction of Takakkawia lineata

Scientific classification
- Kingdom: Animalia
- Phylum: Porifera
- Class: Demospongiae
- Order: †Protomonaxonida
- Family: †Takakkawiidae
- Genus: †Takakkawia; Walcott, 1920

Species
- Takakkawia lineata Walcott, 1920; Takakkawia sp. nov. Chen et al. 1996

= Takakkawia =

Takakkawia Temporal range: Chengjiang to Middle Cambrian

Extinct genus of sponges

Takakkawia is a genus of sponge in the order Protomonaxonida and the family Takakkawiidae. It is known from the Middle Cambrian Burgess Shale that reached around 4 cm in height. Its structure comprises four columns of multi-rayed, organic spicules (perhaps originally calcareous or siliceous) that align to form flanges. The spicules form blade-like structures, ornamented with concentric rings.

It was first described in 1920 by Charles Doolittle Walcott. Takakkaw Falls which mark the start of the trail to Fossil Ridge. 1377 specimens of Takakkawia are known from the Greater Phyllopod bed, where they comprise 2.62% of the community.
