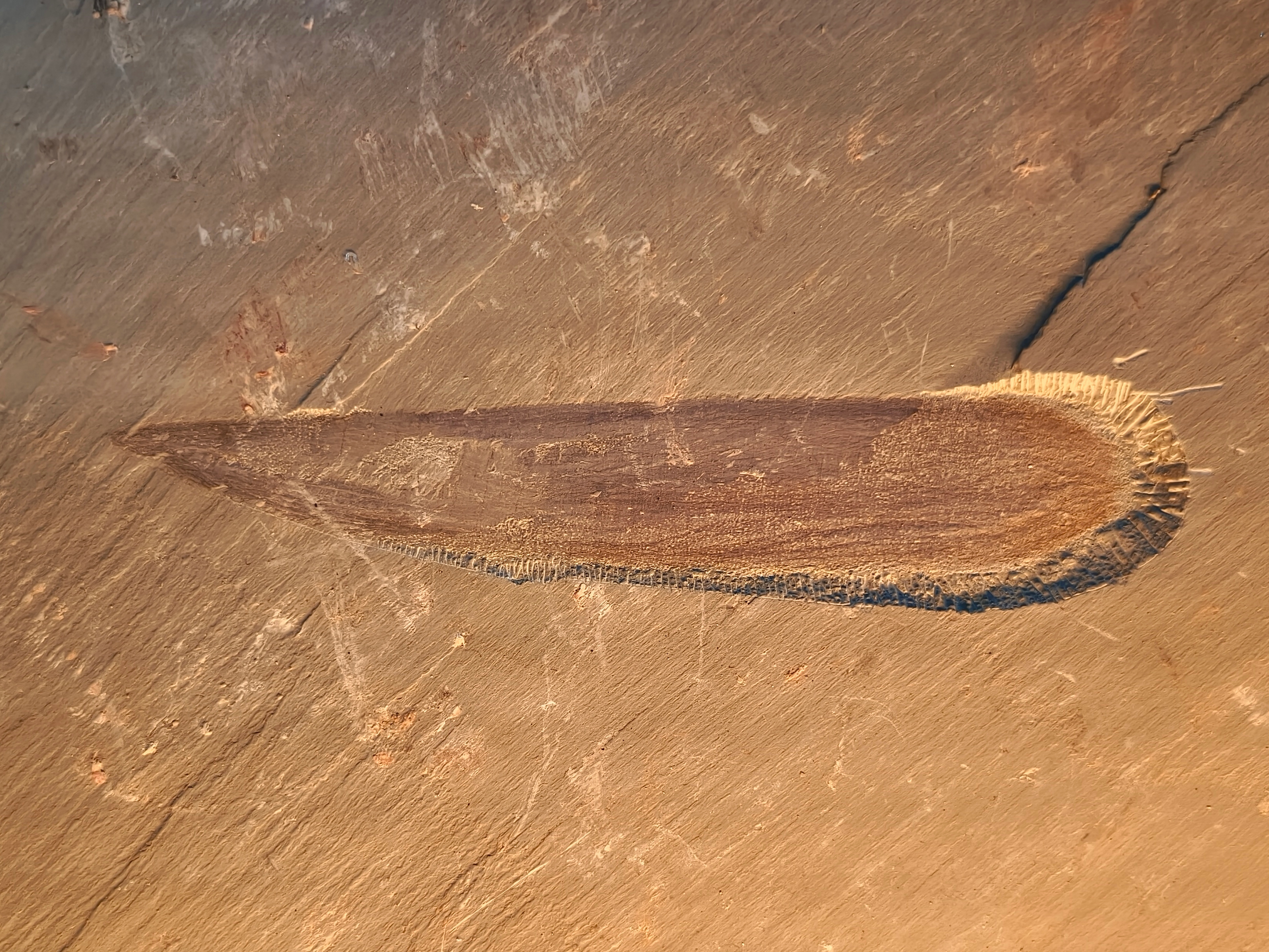
- Fossil specimen of L. teretiusculus

Scientific classification
- Kingdom: Animalia
- Phylum: Porifera
- Class: Demospongiae
- Order: †Protomonaxonida
- Family: †Leptomitidae
- Genus: †Leptomitus; Walcott, 1886

Type species
- Leptomitus zitteli Walcott, 1886

Species
- L. conicus García-Bellido et al., 2007; L. lineatus (Walcott, 1920) Rigby & Collins, 2004; L. metta Rigby, 1983; L. teretiusculus Chen, Hou & Lu, 1989; L. undulatus Rigby & Collins, 2004; L. zitteli Walcott, 1886

Synonyms
- †Tuponia Walcott, 1920

= Leptomitus =

Leptomitus Temporal range: Middle Cambrian

Genus of sponges

Leptomitus is a genus of demosponge known from the Middle Cambrian Burgess Shale. Its name is derived from the Greek lept ('slender') and mitos ('thread'), referring to the overall shape of the sponge. 138 specimens of Leptomitus are known from the Greater Phyllopod bed, where they comprise 0.26% of the community.
