= Protomonaxonida =

Protomonaxonida Temporal range: 516.0–150 Ma

Scientific classification
- Kingdom: Animalia
- Phylum: Porifera
- Class: Demospongiae
- Order: †Protomonaxonida; Finks et al. 2004

Families
- †Choiidae; †Halichondritidae; †Hamptoniidae; †Hazeliidae; †Leptomitidae; †Lobatospongia; †Piraniidae; †Takakkawiidae; †Ulospongiellidae; †Wapkiidae

Extinct order of sponges

Protomonaxonida is an extinct order of sea sponges. It is a paraphyletic group gathering the most ancient species from the Burgess Shale to modern sponges.

== Families and genera ==
- Family †Choiidae Laubenfels, 1925
  - Genus †Allantospongia Rigby & Hou, 1995
  - Genus †Choia Walcott, 1920
  - Genus †Choiaella Rigby & Hou, 1995
  - Genus †Lenica Goryanskiy, 1977
  - Genus †Neochoiaella Keupp & Schweigert, 2012
- Family †Halichondritidae Rigby, 1986
  - Genus †Halichondrites Walcott, 1920
  - Genus †Pohlispongia Rigby & von Bitter, 2005
- Family †Hamptoniidae De Laubenfels, 1955
  - Genus †Hamptonia Walcott, 1920
  - Genus †Hamptoniella Rigby & Collins, 2004
- Family †Hazeliidae De Laubenfels, 1955
  - Genus †Crumillospongia Rigby, 1986
  - Genus †Falospongia Rigby, 1986
  - Genus †Hazelia Walcott, 1920
- Family †Leptomitidae De Laubenfels, 1955
  - Genus †Leptomitus Walcott, 1886
  - Genus †Paraleptomitella Chen et al., 1989
  - Genus †Pseudoleptomitus Botting et al., 2019
  - Genus †Wareiella Rigby & Harris, 1979
- Genus †Lobatospongia Rigby et al., 2007
- Family †Piraniidae De Laubenfels, 1955
  - Genus †Moleculospina Rigby, 1986
  - Genus †Pirania Walcott, 1920
- Family †Takakkawiidae De Laubenfels, 1955
  - Genus †Takakkawia Walcott, 1920
- Family †Ulospongiellidae Rigby & Collins, 2004
  - Genus †Hapalospongia Rigby & Collins, 2004
  - Genus †Ulospongiella Rigby & Collins, 2004
- Family †Wapkiidae De Laubenfels, 1955
  - Genus †Wapkia Walcott, 1920

The following families from the order Hadromerida are also sometimes placed in Protomonaxonida:

- Family Sollasellidae von Lendenfeld, 1887
  - Genus †Luterospongia Rigby et al., 2008
  - Genus †Mckittrickella Rigby et al., 2007
  - Genus †Monaxoradiata Rigby & Bell, 2006
  - Genus †Opetionella Zittel, 1878
  - Genus †Rhizopsis Schrammen, 1910
  - Genus †Stramentella Gerasimov, 1960
  - Genus †Trichospongiella Rigby, 1971
- Family Tethyidae Gray, 1867
  - Genus Tethya Lamarck, 1814
