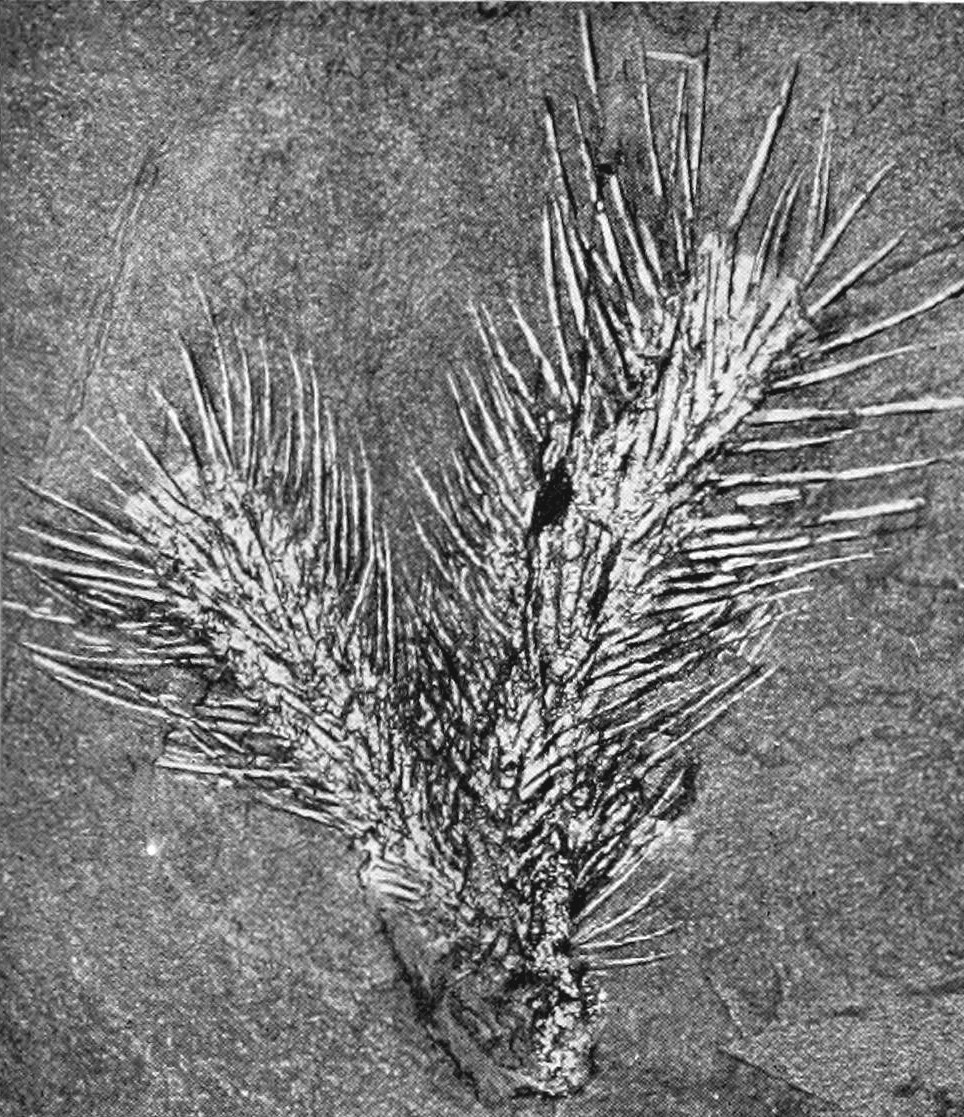
- Fossil specimen
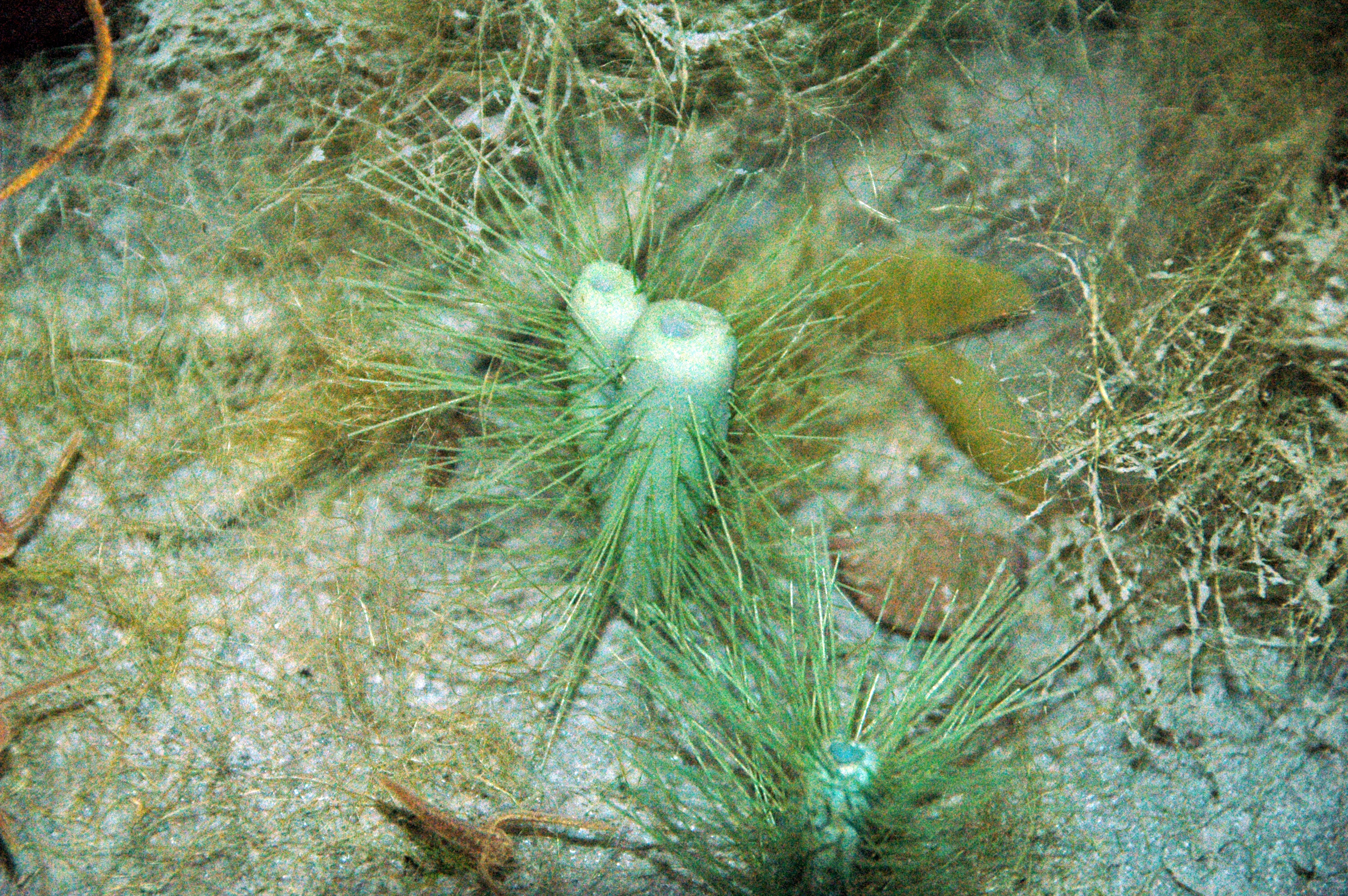
- Restoration model

Scientific classification
- Kingdom: Animalia
- Phylum: Porifera
- Class: Demospongiae
- Order: †Protomonaxonida
- Family: †Piraniidae
- Genus: †Pirania; Walcott, 1920

Type species
- Pirania muricata Walcott, 1920

Species
- Pirania auraenum Botting, 2007; Pirania llanfawrensis Botting, 2004; Pirania muricata Walcott, 1920

= Pirania =

Pirania Temporal range: Burgess Shale–Middle Ordovician

Extinct genus of sponges

Pirania is an extinct genus of sea sponge known from the Middle Cambrian Burgess Shale and the Ordovician Fezouata formation. It is named after Mount St. Piran, a mountain situated in the Bow River Valley in Banff National Park, Alberta. It was first described in 1920 by Charles Doolittle Walcott. 198 specimens of Pirania are known from the Greater Phyllopod bed, where they comprise 0.38% of the community.
