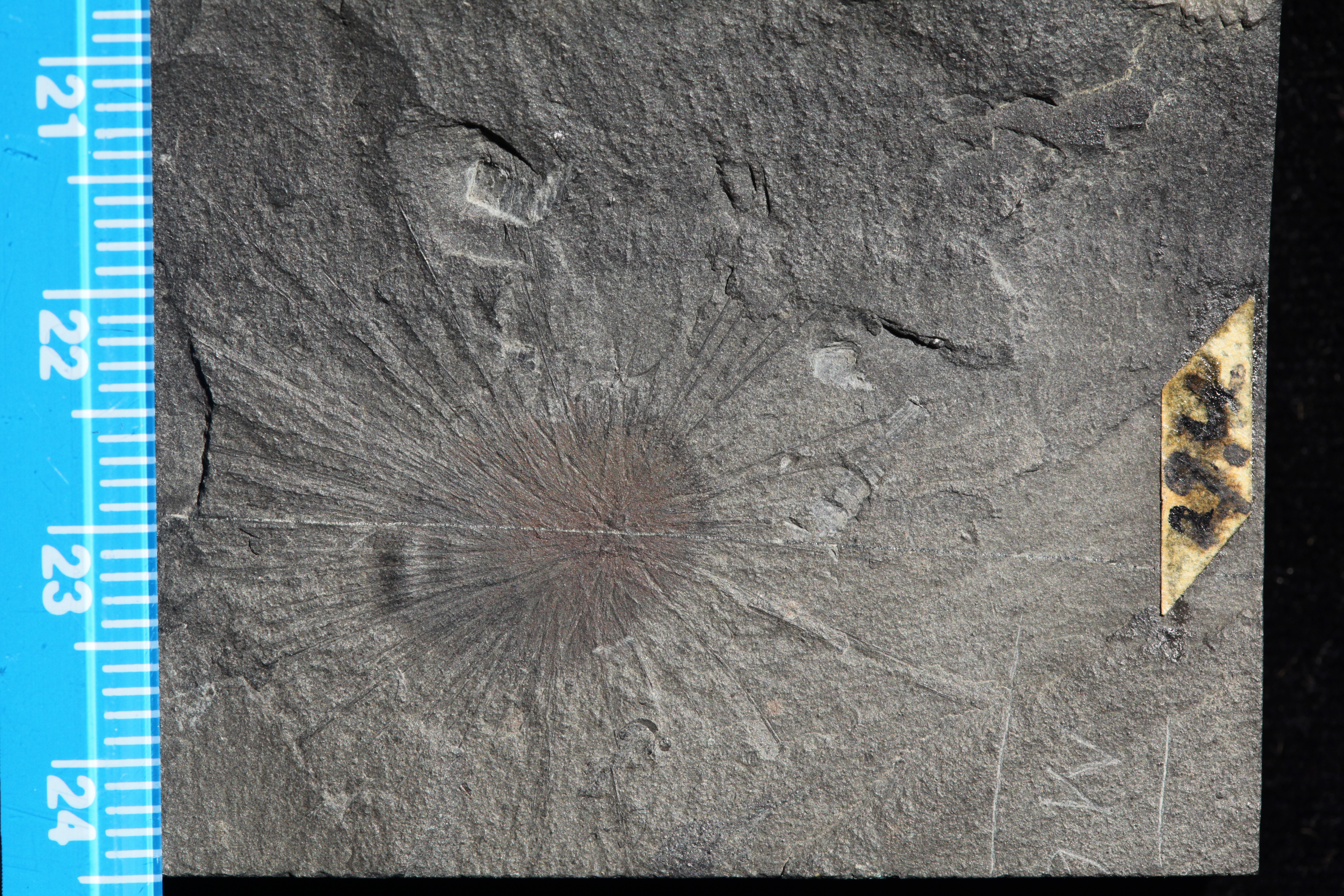
- Fossil of Choia carteri from the Burgess Shale

Scientific classification
- Kingdom: Animalia
- Phylum: Porifera
- Class: Demospongiae
- Order: †Protomonaxonida
- Family: †Choiidae
- Genus: †Choia; Walcott, 1920

Type species
- †Choia carteri Walcott, 1920

Species
- †C. carteri Walcott, 1920; †C. hindei (Dawson, 1896); †C. utahensis Walcott, 1920; †C. ridleyi Walcott, 1920; †?C. striata Xiao et al., 2005; †C. xiaolantianensis Hou et al. 1999; †C. qingjiangensis Wu et al., 2025; †C. textura Wu et al., 2025

= Choia =

Choia Temporal range: Cambrian Stage 3–Arenig

Genus of sponges

Choia is a genus of extinct demosponge ranging from the Cambrian until the Lower Ordovician periods. Fossils of Choia have been found in the Burgess Shale in British Columbia; the Maotianshan shales of China; the Wheeler Shale in Utah; the Itajaí Basin in Brazil; and the Lower Ordovician Fezouata formation. It was first described in 1920 by Charles Doolittle Walcott.

== Life habit ==
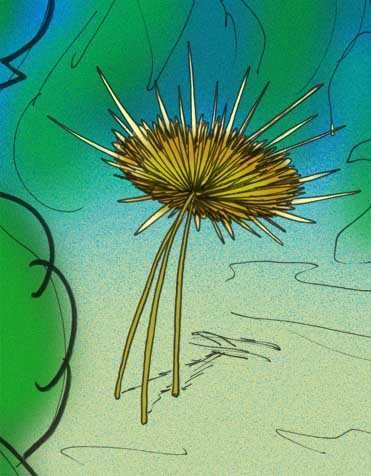
Reconstruction of C. carteri, as according to the Fezouata specimens

Choia was originally thought to be not attached to the sea bed: the living animal was originally thought to rest directly on the substrate, with the radiating spines from the edge of its flattish, conical body, giving an appearance not unlike that of the peak of a big top, with guy lines. Recently discovered fossils from Lower Ordovician Morocco show that the living animal was actually suspended high above the seafloor, attached via stalk-like spines derived from spicules. Water is assumed to have entered the sponge parallel to the spines, being expelled, presumably, from a central opening. Species reached up to an average of 28 mm in diameter.

== Distribution ==
127 specimens of Choia are known from the Greater Phyllopod bed, where they comprise 0.2% of the community.

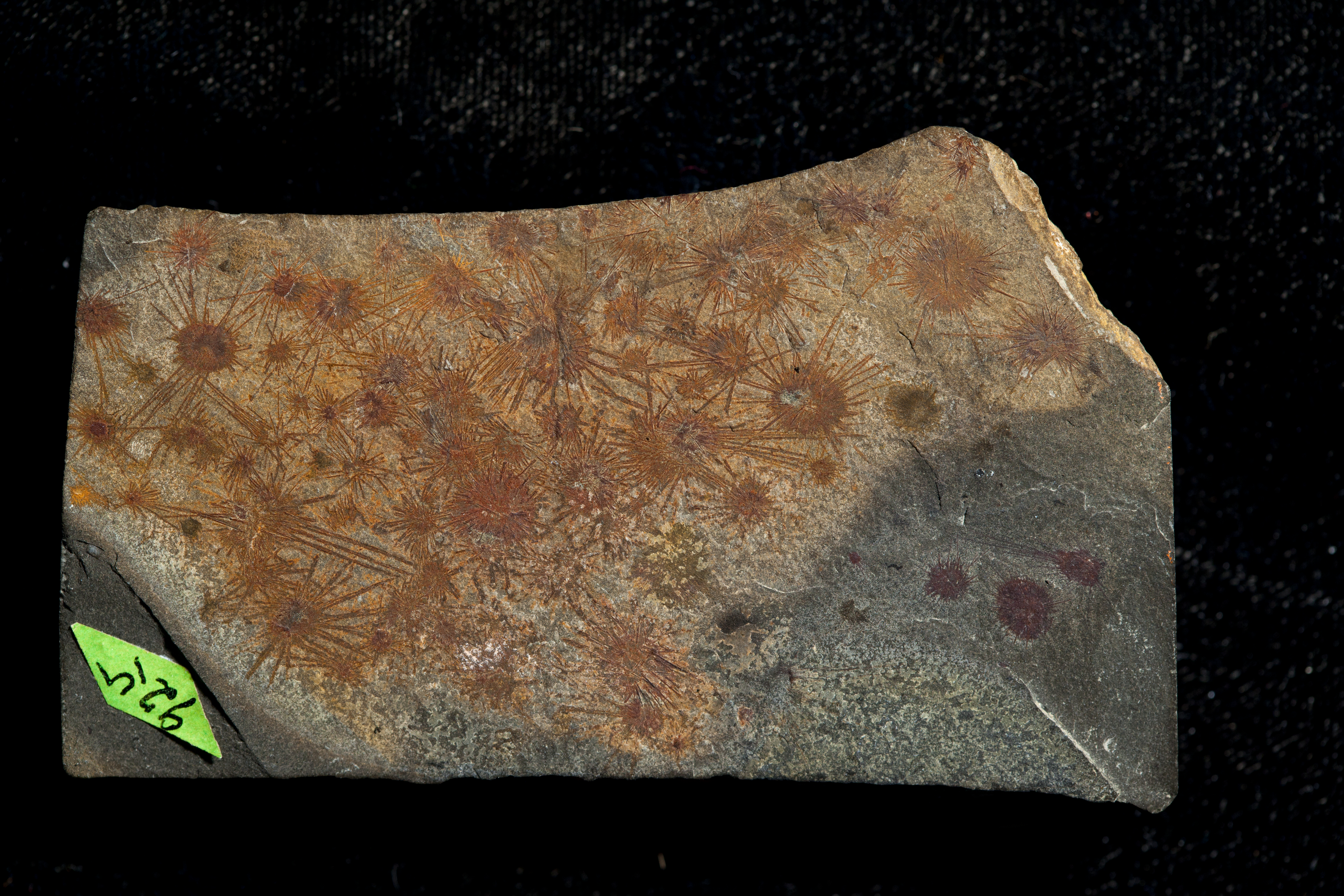
Fossils of C. ridleyi from the Burgess Shale

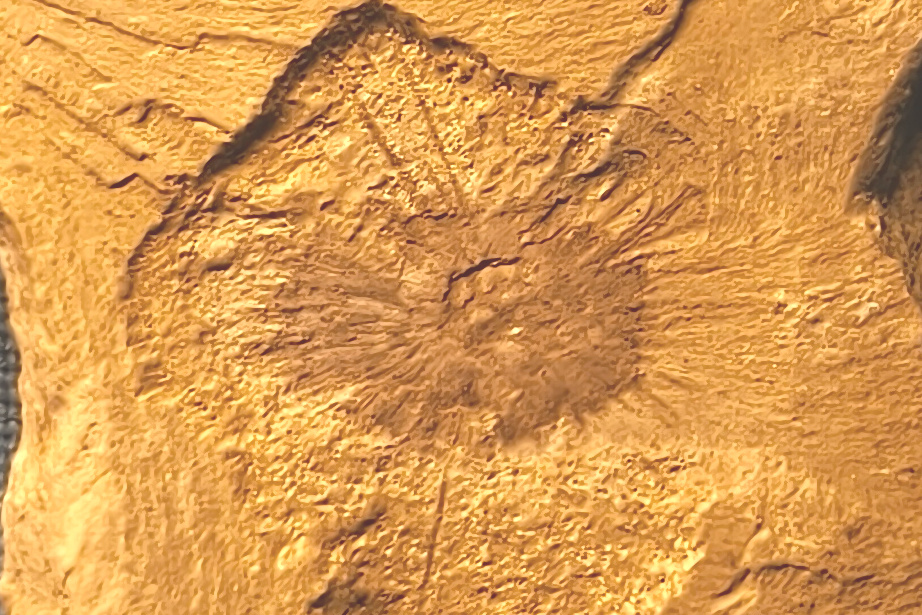
Fossil of C. xiaolantianensis from the Maotianshan Shales

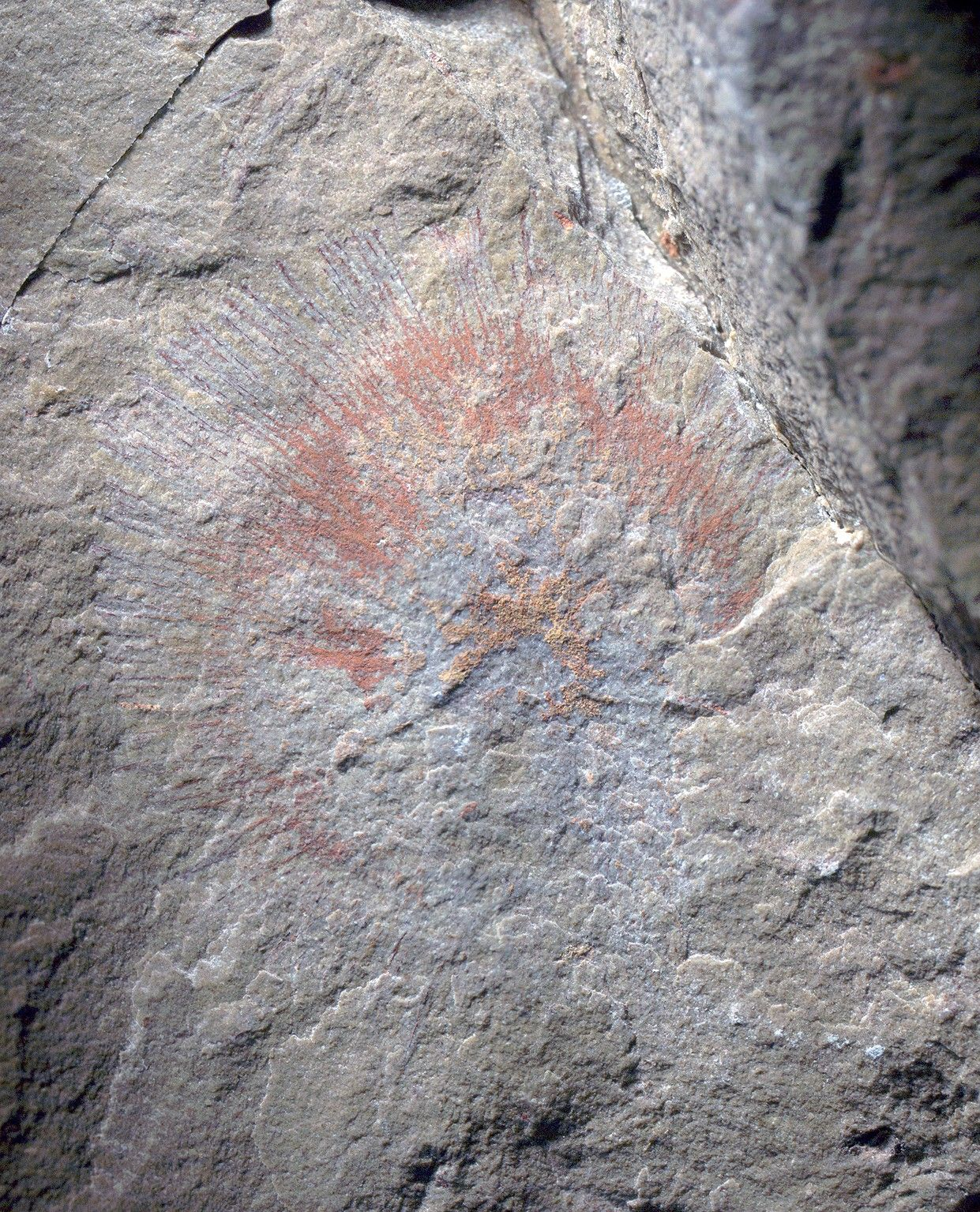
Fossil of C. sp from the Fezouata biota

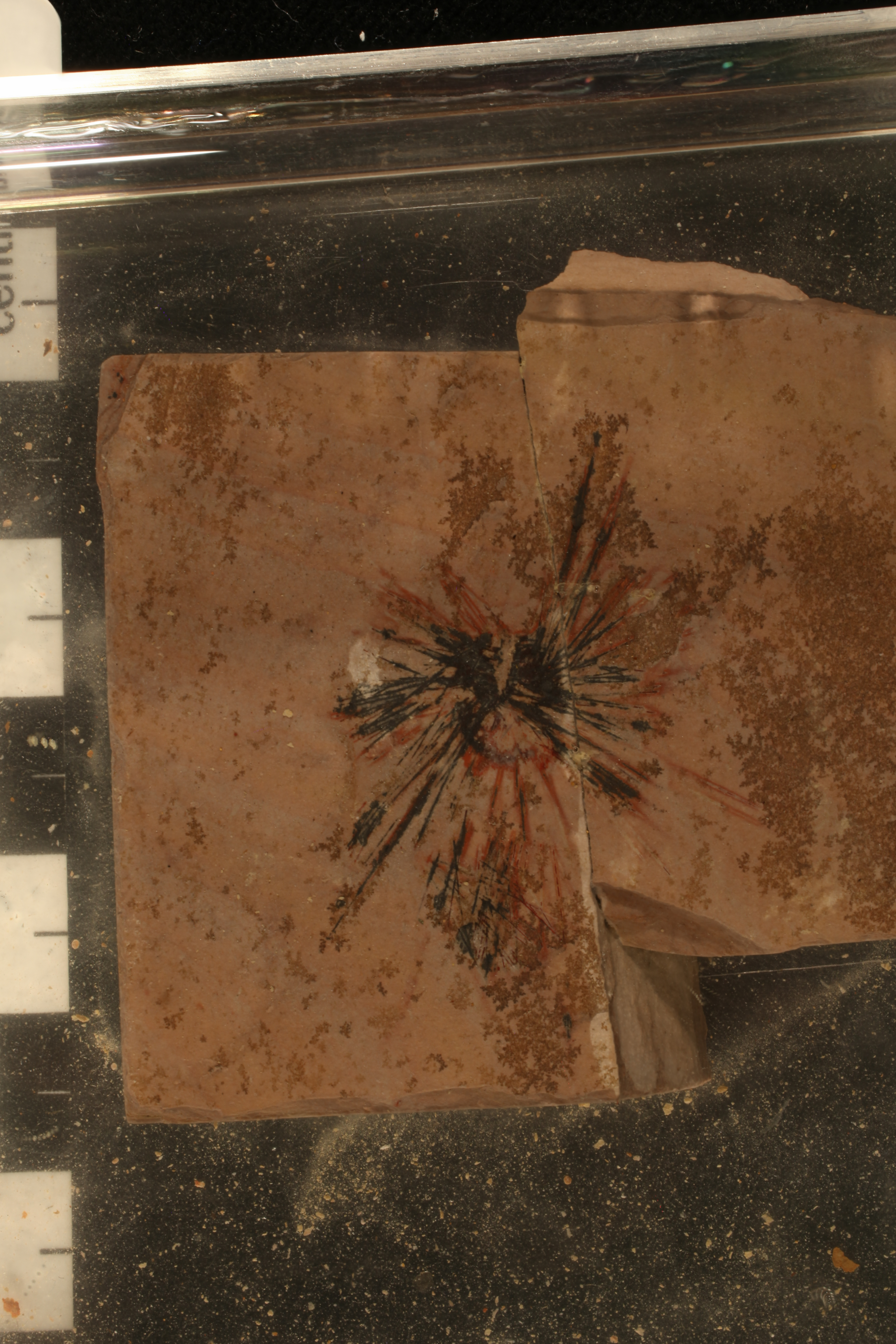
Fossil of C. utahensis from the Wheeler Shale
