= List of prehistoric sponge genera =

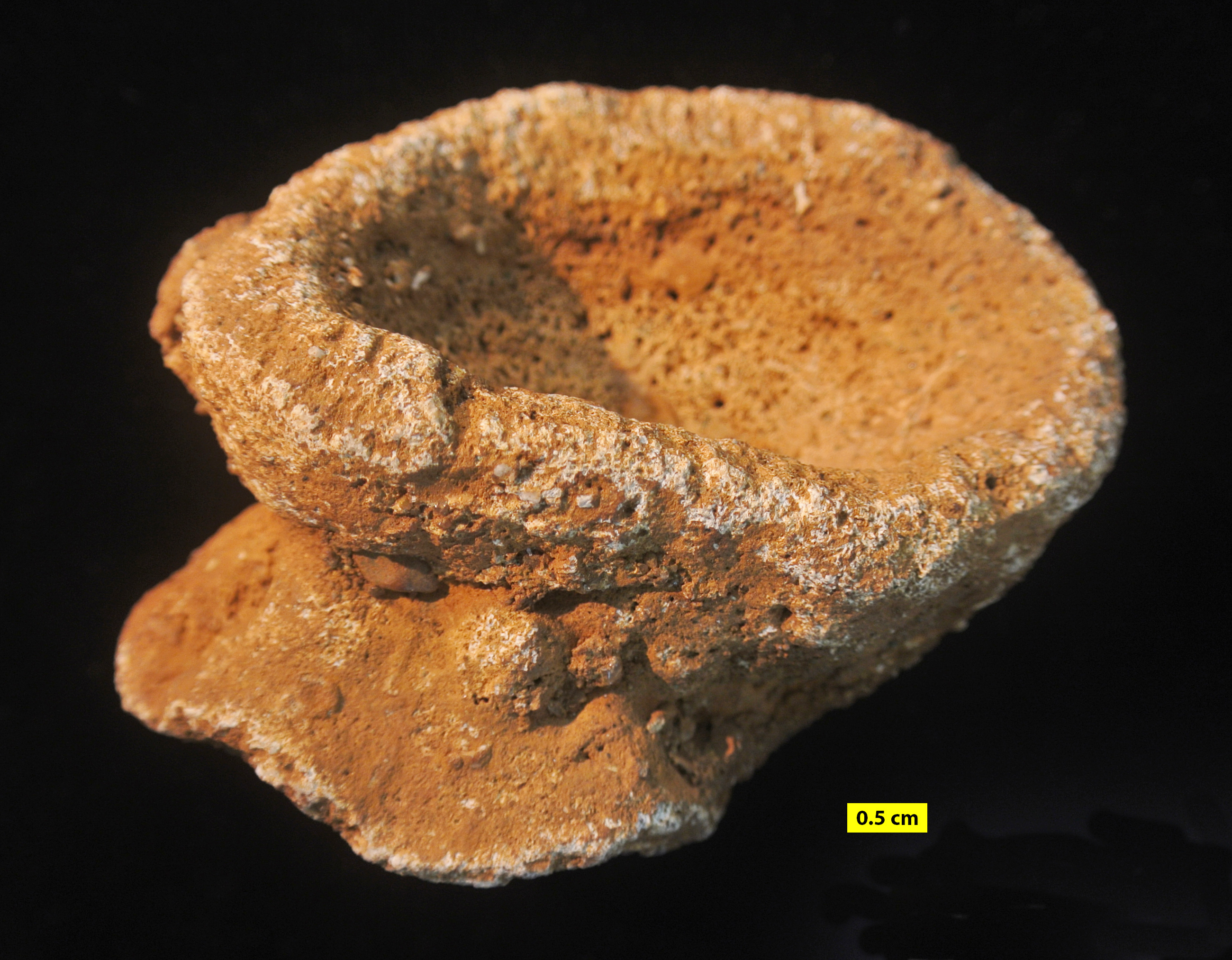
Raphidonema faringdonense, a fossil sponge from the Cretaceous period of England.

This list of prehistoric sponges is an attempt to create a comprehensive listing of all genera that have ever been included in the phylum Porifera, excluding purely vernacular terms. The list includes all commonly accepted genera, but also genera that are now considered invalid, doubtful (nomina dubia), or were not formally published (nomina nuda), as well as junior synonyms of more established names, and genera that are no longer considered to be sponges.

== Naming conventions and terminology ==
Naming conventions and terminology follow the International Code of Zoological Nomenclature. Technical terms used include:

- Junior synonym: A name which describes the same taxon as a previously published name. If two or more genera are formally designated and the type specimens are later assigned to the same genus, the first to be published (in chronological order) is the senior synonym, and all other instances are junior synonyms. Senior synonyms are generally used, except by special decision of the ICZN, but junior synonyms cannot be used again, even if deprecated. Junior synonymy is often subjective, unless the genera described were both based on the same type specimen.
- Nomen nudum (Latin for "naked name"): A name that has appeared in print but has not yet been formally published by the standards of the ICZN. Nomina nuda (the plural form) are invalid, and are therefore not italicized as a proper generic name would be. If the name is later formally published, that name is no longer a nomen nudum and will be italicized on this list. Often, the formally published name will differ from any nomina nuda that describe the same specimen.
- Nomen oblitum (Latin for "forgotten name"): A name that has not been used in the scientific community for more than fifty years after its original proposal.
- Preoccupied name: A name that is formally published, but which has already been used for another taxon. This second use is invalid (as are all subsequent uses) and the name must be replaced. As preoccupied names are not valid generic names, they will also go unitalicized on this list.
- Nomen dubium (Latin for "dubious name"): A name describing a fossil with no unique diagnostic features. As this can be an extremely subjective and controversial designation, this term is not used on this list.

Contents:	A B C D E F G H I J K L M N O P Q R S T U V W X Y Z — See also

== A ==
- Acanothyia
- Acanthactinella
- Acanthastrella
- Acanthochaetetes
- Acanthocoryna
- Acanthodictya
- Acanthophora
- Acanthopyrgus (synonym of Yukonensis; name was already occupied by a genus of grasshoppers (Acanthopyrgus, Descamps & Wintrbert 1966)
- Acanthoraphis
- Acanthospongia
- Achrochordiella
- Achrochordonia
- Acloeodictya
- Acoelia
- Acosmostroma
- Actinocoelia
- Actinodictya
- Actinodictyon
- Actinofungia
- Actinolites
- Actinostromaria
- Actinostromarianina
- Actinostromella
- Actostroma
- Aculatostroma
- Adrianella
- Adriatella
- Afiacyathus
- Agastrocyathus
- Aglithodictya
- Agyrekocyathus
- Ajacicyathellus
- Ajacicyathus
- Aka
- Aksopora
- Alaskacoscinus
- Alaskaspongia
- Alasonia
- Alataucyathus
- Alconeracyathus
- Alectona
- Allantospongia
- Alleynodictyon
- Allomera
- Allonia
- Allosaccus
- Allossospongia
- Alosculum
- Alphacyathus
- Alpinothalamia
- Altaicyathus
- Amblysiphonella
- Amblysiphonelloides
- Amnestostroma
- Amphilectella
- Amphipora
- Amphispongia
- Amphorithalamia
- Amsassia
- Anaptyctocyathus
- Andreaea (sponge)
- Angaricyathus
- Angullongia
- Annaecoelia
- Annulocyathella
- Annulocyathus
- Annulofungia
- Anomoclonella
- Anomorphites
- Anostylostroma
- Antarcticocyathus
- Anthaspidella
- Anthomorpha
- Anthracosycon
- Antoniocoscinus
- Antrispongia
- Antrospongia
- Aphlebospongia
- Aphrocallistes
- Aphrosalpinx
- Aplosphecion
- Aplysinofibra
- Apocoelia
- Aporosocyathus
- Aptocyathella
- Aptocyathus
- Arakespongia
- Araneosustroma
- Arborohindia
- Arbuscula
- Archaeocyathus (originally spelled Archeocyathus)
- Archaeodoryderma
- Archaeolynthus
- Archaeopharetra
- Archaeoscyphia
- Archaeosycon
- Archiasterella
- Arctostroma
- Ardrossacyathus
- Arimasia
- Armstrongia
- Arrythmocricus
- Arthaberia
- Arturocyathus
- Arystidictyon
- Asteractinella
- Asteriospongia
- Asterocyathus
- Asterospongia
- Asterotumulus
- Asthenospongia
- Astraeoconus
- Astraeospongium
- Astrobolia
- Astrocladia
- Astroconia
- Astrolemma
- Astropegma
- Astroporina
- Astrosclerida
- Astrostylopsis
- Astylomanon
- Astylospongia
- Astylospongiella
- Ataxiocyathus
- Atelodictyon
- Atopostroma
- Atrochaetetes
- Attungaia
- Aulacera
- Aulacosia
- Aulacospongia
- Aulaxinia
- Auliscocyathus
- Aulocopella
- Aulocopina
- Aulocopium
- Aulocricus
- Aulocyclus
- Aulodomus
- Aulophax
- Aulosoma
- Aulospongia
- Auroria
- Australispongia
- Azorica
- Azyrtalia

== B ==
- Baccispongia
- Bactronella
- Baikalocyathus
- Balantionella
- Balatonia
- Barrandeolites
- Barroisia
- Bathotheca
- Batschykicyathus
- Battaglia
- Bauneia
- Beaussetia
- Becksia
- Belemnospongia
- Belemnostroma
- Belonisia
- Beltanacyathus
- Belubulaia
- Belubulaspongia
- Bicolumnostratum
- Bicoscinus
- Bifariostroma
- Bipallicyathus
- Blastinia
- Blastinoidea
- Blastochaetetes
- Blastulospongia
- Boikothalamia
- Bolidium
- Bolitesia
- Bolojerea
- Bolospongia
- Boonderooia
- Borocyathus
- Bothoteca
- Bothrochlaenia
- Bothroconis
- Bothrolemma
- Botocyathus
- Botroclonium
- Botryodictya
- Botryosella
- Bottonaecyathus
- Brachiospongia
- Bractocyathus
- Brevisiphonella
- Brianispongia
- Brochodora
- Bullulodictyon
- Burgundia
- Butakovicyathus

== C ==
- Cadniacyathus
- Caesaria
- Calamopora (synonym of Hindia)
- Calathiscus
- Calathospongia
- Calcihexactina
- Calcistella
- Calicia
- Caliculospongia
- Callicylix
- Callodictyon
- Callopegma
- Calthropella
- Calycocoelia
- Calycospongia
- Calymmatina
- Calyptocoscinus
- Calyptrella
- Cambrocyathells
- Camellaspongia
- Cameroptychium
- Camerospongia
- Canistrumella
- Capsospongia
- Capsulocyathus
- Carinacyathus
- Carnegiea
- Carphites
- Carpicyathus
- Carpospongia
- Carta
- Carterella
- Caryoconus
- Caryomanon
- Caryospongia
- Caseispongia
- Cassianochaetes
- Cassianostroma
- Cassianothalamia
- Catenispongia
- Cauliculospongia
- Caulophacus
- Cavispongia
- Cavusonella
- Cellicyathus
- Celyphia
- Ceotinella
- Cephalites
- Cephaloraphidites
- Ceraostroma
- Ceratodictya
- Ceratoporella
- Ceriodictyon
- Chaetetella
- Chaetetes
- Chaetetipora
- Chaetetopsis
- Chakassicyathus
- Chalaropegma
- Chancelloria
- Changicyathus
- Chankacyathus
- Chaunactis
- Cheilosporites
- Chenendopora
- Chiastoclonella
- Chirospongia
- Choia
- Choiaella
- Chondrocladia
- Chonellopsis
- Chouberticyathus
- Churanocyathus
- Cinclidella
- Cincliderma
- Cinnabaria
- Circopora
- Cladocoropsis
- Cladodermia
- Cladodia
- Cladolithosia
- Cladorhiza
- Claruscoscinus
- Clathricoscinus
- Clathricyathus
- Clathrispongia
- Clathrithalamus
- Clathrocoilona
- Clathrodictyella
- Clathrodictyon
- Clathrospongia
- Clathrostroma
- Clavidictyon
- Cleodictya
- Clepsydrospongia
- Clifdenella
- Climacospongia
- Cliona
- Cnemaulax
- Cnemicopanon
- Cnemidiastrum
- Coelocladia
- Coelocladiella
- Coeloconia
- Coelocorypha
- Coeloptychium
- Coeloscyphia
- Coelosphaeroma
- Coenostella
- Coenostroma
- Collatipora
- Colossolacis
- Colpospongia
- Columellaespongia
- Columna
- Columnostroma
- Compositocyathus
- Compsaspis
- Conannulofungia
- Condylacanthus
- Coniatopenia
- Coniculospongia
- Conispongia
- Conocoelia
- Constellatospongia
- Copleicyathus
- Corallidium
- Corallistes
- Cordilleracyathus
- Cordobicyathus
- Cornuaspongia
- Corralio
- Corticium
- Corticospongia
- Corticulospongia
- Corymbospongia
- Corynella
- Coscinaulus
- Coscinocyathella
- Coscinocyathellus
- Coscinocyathus
- Coscinodiscus
- Coscinopora
- Coscinoptycta
- Coscinospongia
- Cotylahindia
- Cotyliscus
- Còyptoporocyathus
- Craniella
- Crassicoscinus
- Crateromorpha
- Craticularia
- Crawneya
- Cribrospongia
- Cribrothalamia
- Crispispongia
- Crucispongia
- Crumillospongia
- Cryptocoelia
- Cryptodictya
- Cryptophragmus
- Cucumaltina
- Cupulina
- Cyathocricus
- Cyathodictya
- Cyathophycus
- Cyathophyscus
- Cyathospongia
- Cycloclema
- Cyclocyathella
- Cyclostigma
- Cylicoopsis
- Cylindrophyma
- Cymbochlaenia
- Cypellia
- Cypellospongia
- Cyrtobolia
- Cysticyathus
- Cystispongia
- Cystistroma
- Cystocerium
- Cystostroma
- Cystothalamia
- Cystothalamiella
- Cytoracea

== D ==
- Dactylites
- Dactylocalycites
- Dactylocalyx
- Daharella
- Dailycyathus
- Deceptioncyathus
- Defordia
- Degeletticyathus
- Denaecyathus
- Dendroclonella
- Deningeria
- Densastroma
- Densocyathus
- Dentatocoscinus
- Dermatostroma
- Desmidopora
- Desmoderma
- Desmopora
- Desmostroma
- Devonoscyphia
- Devonospongia
- Diacyparia
- Diagoniella
- Diaplectia
- Diasterofungia
- Dichojerea
- Dicranoclonella
- Dictyocoelia
- Dictyocyathus
- Dictyofavus
- Dictyophyton
- Dictyorhabdus
- Dictyospongia
- Dictyosycon
- Didymocyathus
- Didymosphaera
- Diecithalamia
- Dierespongia
- Diestosphecion
- Dimorpha
- Diphyllospira
- Diplochaetetes
- Diplocyathellus
- Diplodictyon
- Diplopleura
- Diplostoma
- Diplostroma
- Discispongia
- Discocoeila
- Discodermia
- Discodermites
- Discophyma
- Discosiphonella
- Discostroma
- Disjectopora
- Disparistromaria
- Ditraenella
- Divaricospongia
- Docoderma
- Dokidocyathella
- Dokidocyathus
- Doryderma
- Dracolychnus
- Drosdoria
- Drosdovia
- Dunhillia
- Dupliporocyathus
- Dyoconia
- Dyocopanon
- Dysidea
- Dystactospongia

== E ==
- Ecblastesia
- Ecclimadictyon
- Echidnina
- Ectenodictya
- Edelsteinia
- Edriospongia
- Eiffelia
- Elasma
- Elasmalimus
- Elasmocoelia
- Elasmoierea
- Elasmostoma
- Ellesmerespongia
- Ellipsactinia
- Emploca
- Enaulofungia
- Endoplegma
- Endostoma
- Enoplocoelia
- Ensiferites
- Eochaunactis
- Eocoryne
- Eospongia
- Epeudea
- Epiplastospongia
- Epistomella
- Epitheles
- Erbocyathus
- Eremitacyathus
- Erineum
- Erismacoscinus
- Erugatocyathus
- Erylus
- Esperites
- Etalloniella
- Etheridgia
- Ethmocoscinus
- Ethmocyathus
- Ethmophyllum
- Eubrochis
- Eubrochus
- Eudea
- Eudictyon
- Euepirrhysia
- Euleraphe
- Euplectella
- Eurete
- Euryamphipora
- Eurydiscites
- Eusiphonella
- Eustrobilus
- Eutactostomium
- Euzittelia
- Euzkadiella
- Exanthesis
- Exochopora
- Exodictydia

== F ==
- Faciledictyon
- Fallocyathus
- Falospongia
- Faniathalamia
- Fansycyathus
- Farrea
- Farreopsis
- Favilynthus
- Favosichaetetes
- Feifelia
- Felixium
- Fenestrocyathus
- Fenestrospongia
- Ferestromatopora
- Fieldospongia
- Finksella
- Fissispongia
- Fistellaspongia
- Fistulimurina
- Fistulisponga
- Flabellispongia
- Flexanulus
- Flexiostroma
- Flosculus
- Foerstella
- Follicalena
- Forcepia
- Formosocyathus
- Forolina
- Fragilicyathus
- Fransuasaecyathus
- Frinalicyathus
- Fusiferella

== G ==
- Gabelia
- Gabrielsocyathus
- Gagarinicyathus
- Garraspongia
- Gaspespongia
- Gatagacyathus
- Geniculicyathus
- Geocyathus
- Geodia
- Geodiopsis
- Geodites
- Gerronodictyon
- Gerronostroma
- Gevreya
- Gigantospongia
- Gignouxia
- Gillettia
- Ginkgospongia
- Girtycoelia
- Glenodictyum
- Glomocystospongia
- Gloriosocyathus
- Glyptostromoides
- Gnaltacyathus
- Gomphites
- Gonamispongia
- Gondekia
- Gongylospongia
- Gordonicyathus
- Gordonifungia
- Goreauiella
- Graminospongia
- Graphoscyphus
- Gravestockia
- Griphodictya
- Grossotubenella
- Guadalupia
- Guettardiscyphia
- Guitarra
- Guizhouchaetetes
- Gumbycyathus
- Gyrispongia

== H ==
- Habrosium
- Habrostroma
- Halichondrites
- Halina
- Hallirhoa
- Hallodictya
- Halysicyathus
- Hamacantha
- Hammatostroma
- Hamptonia
- Hapalopegma
- Haplistion
- Haplistionella
- Hartmanina
- Hazelia
- Heckericyathus
- Heftastylis
- Helicodictya
- Helicolocellus
- Heliospongia
- Helminthophyllum
- Helobrachium
- Heloraphinia
- Hemidiscella
- Hemithalamocyathus
- Henricellum
- Heptastylis
- Hermatoporella
- Hermatostroma
- Hermatostromella
- Hesperocoelia
- Heteroraphidites
- Heterospongia
- Heterostella
- Heterostinia
- Hexactinella
- Hexactractiella
- Hexastylostroma
- Himatella
- Hindia
- Hintzesnonaia
- Hintzespongia
- Hippalimus
- Hispidopetra
- Hodsia
- Holasterella
- Holcospongia
- Holocoelia
- Holodictyon
- Homalodora
- Hormathospongia
- Hormospongia
- Hudsonella
- Hudsonospongia
- Hunanospongia
- Hupecyathellus
- Hupecyathus
- Hyaloderma
- Hyalonemia
- Hyalospongia
- Hyalostelia
- Hyalotragos
- Hydnoangulus
- Hydnoceras
- Hydnocerina
- Hydnodictya
- Hydriodictya
- Hymedesmia
- Hypothyra
- Hyptocyathus

== I ==
- Ichnospongia
- Ichnusocyathus
- Idiodictyon
- Idiostroma
- Iljinicyathus
- Imbricatocoelia
- Imperatoria
- Imponodictyon
- Inacyathella
- Incurvocyathus
- Inessocyathellus
- Inessocyathus
- Infexiostella
- Ingentilotus
- Inobolia
- Inodia
- Insulipora
- Intexodictyon
- Intextum
- Intrasporeocoelia
- Intratubospongia
- Iophon
- Iouea
- Iowaspongia
- Irinaecyathus
- Irpaspongia
- Irregulatopora
- Ischadia
- Isispongia
- Isiticyathus
- Isoraphinia
- Itararella
- Ithacadictya

== J ==
- Jablonskyia
- Jakutocarinus
- Jangudacyathus
- Japhanicyathus
- Jawonya
- Jebileticoscinus
- Jerea
- Jereica
- Jereina
- Jereomorpha
- Jereopsis
- Jianghania
- Jima
- Joanaecyathus
- Jugalicyathus

== K ==
- Kalimnospongia
- Kalpinella
- Kaltatocyathus
- Karatubulus
- Kasyricyathus
- Kazania
- Kechikacyathus
- Kellericyathus
- Kentrosia
- Keriocoelia
- Keriocyathus
- Keriogastrospongia
- Khalfinaea
- Khasaktia
- Kidjasocyathus
- Kijacyathus
- Kisasacyathus
- Kiwetinokia
- Kiwicyathus
- Kolbicyathus
- Koleostoma
- Komia
- Konyrium
- Kordecyathus
- Korovinella
- Korshunovicyathus
- Kotuyicoscinus
- Kozlowskispongia
- Krasnopeevacyathus
- Kruseicnema
- Kyarocyathus
- Kymbecyathus
- Kyphoclonella

== L ==
- Labechia
- Labechiella
- Ladaecyathus
- Lamellata
- Lamellistroma
- Lamellopora
- Landercyathus
- Lanicyathus
- Laocaetis
- Lasiocladia
- Lasiothrix
- Latrunculia
- Laubenfelsia
- Lebedictya
- Lecanella
- Lecomptella
- Lefroyella
- Leinia
- Leiocarenus
- Leiochaetetes
- Leiochonia
- Leiodermatium
- Leiodorella
- Leiophyllum
- Leiospongia
- Leiostracosia
- Lemonea
- Lenica
- Lenocyathus
- Lepidospongia
- Leptolacis
- Leptomitella
- Leptomitus
- Leptophragma
- Leptopoterion
- Leptosocyathellus
- Leptosocyathus
- Lerouxia
- Leuconia
- Lewinia
- Lichuanopora
- Lichuanospongia
- Licmosinion
- Lindstroemispongia
- Lineastroma
- Linochone
- Linonema
- Liscombispongia
- Lissocoelia
- Lithopora
- Lithostrobilis
- Litophyllum
- Loculicyathus
- Loganiella
- Lonsda
- Lopadophorus
- Lopanella
- Lophiostroma
- Ludictyon
- Lumectospongia
- Lunulacyathus
- Lychniscaulus
- Lyidium
- Lymnorea
- Lyrodictya
- Lysactinella

== M ==
- Macandrewia
- Macandrewites
- Mackenziecyathus
- Macrobrochus
- Madonia
- Maiandrocyathus
- Makiyama
- Malinowskiella
- Malluviospongia
- Malumispongium
- Mamelohindia
- Marginospongia
- Marinduqueia
- Markocyathus
- Marshallia
- Mastodictya
- Mastodictyum
- Mastophorus
- Mastophyma
- Mastosia
- Mattajacyathus
- Mattaspongia
- Matthewcyathus
- Mawsonicoscinus
- Meandripetra
- Meandrospongia
- Meandrostia
- Megalelasma
- Megalithistida
- Megaloraphium
- Megarhiza
- Megastroma
- Megastylia
- Melkanicyathus
- Melonanchora
- Melonella
- Membranacyathus
- Mennericyathus
- Merlia
- Metaldetes
- Metamsassia
- Metschnikowia
- Metyacyathellus
- Microblastidium
- Microcoryne
- Microdendron
- Microhemidiscia
- Microrhizophora
- Microstaura
- Mikhnocyathus
- Milleporella
- Milleporidium
- Mimeticosia
- Mixtusdictyon
- Moleculospina
- Molengraafia
- Molybdocyathus
- Monilispongia
- Mootwingeecyathus
- Morenicyathus
- Moretia
- Moretiella
- Moretispongia
- Mortieria
- Moskovia
- Mrassocyathus
- Muchattocyathus
- Muellerithalamia
- Multiloqua
- Multipocula
- Multistella
- Multivasculatus
- Murania
- Murguithalamia
- Myliusia
- Myrioporina
- Myrmecidium
- Myrmeciophytum
- Myrmecioptychium
- Mysterium
- Myxilla

== N ==
- Nabaviella
- Nalivkinicyathus
- Napaeana
- Nelumbia
- Nelumbifolium
- Nematinion
- Nematosalpinx
- Neobeatricea
- Neoguadalupia
- Neohindia
- Neoloculicyathus
- Neopelta
- Neosyringostroma
- Nepheliospongia
- Nephelispongia
- Neuropora
- Nevadathalamia
- Nevadocoelia
- Newellia
- Nibionia
- Nipterella
- Nitidus
- Nochoroicyathus
- Nodulipora
- Norfordia
- Nostrocyathus
- Novitella
- Nucha
- Nuratadictyon

== O ==
- Ocellaria
- Octobrum
- Oculospongia
- Offella
- Okulitchicyathus
- Okulitchina
- Olangocoelia
- Olgaecyathus
- Oligoplagia
- Olkenbachia
- Oncocladia
- Oncophora
- Oncosella
- Oncotoechus
- Opeamorphus
- Opetionella
- Ophiodesia
- Ophiraphidites
- Ophrystoma
- Oppligera
- Orbiasterocyathus
- Orbicoscinus
- Orbicyathellus
- Orbicyathus
- Ordinatus
- Orecyta
- Orienticyathus
- Ornatus
- Orospheciom
- Orthodiscus
- Ortmannia
- Ortmannispongia
- Oslodictyon
- Oxyrhizium
- Ozarkocoelia
- Ozospongia
- Ozotrachelus

== P ==
- Pachastrella
- Pachyascus
- Pachycalymma
- Pachycorynea
- Pachycoscinus
- Pachycothon
- Pachylepisma
- Pachymura
- Pachynion
- Pachypoterion
- Pachypsechia
- Pachyrachis
- Pachysalax
- Pachystylostroma
- Pachyteichisma
- Pachytheca
- Pachytilodia
- Palaeojerea
- Palaeomanon
- Palaeophragmodictya
- Palaeophyma
- Palaeosaccus
- Palaeoschada
- Palaeostauronema
- Palermocoelia
- Palmatohindia
- Palmatospongia
- Palmericyathus
- Pamirochaetetes
- Pamiropora
- Pamirostroma
- Panormida
- Pantokratoria
- Papillocyathus
- Paraaplysinofibria
- Paracoscinus
- Paracraticularia
- Paradeningeria
- Paraleptomitella
- Parallelopora
- Parallelostroma
- Paramblysiphonella
- Paranacyathus
- Paraspelaeum
- Parastromatopora
- Paravesicocaulis
- Parethmophyllum
- Parksia
- Parodospongia
- Paropsites
- Paruvanella
- Patanophyma
- Patellispongia
- Pattersonia
- Pelicaspongia
- Pennastroma
- Peregrinicyathus
- Perimera
- Periphragella
- Periplectum
- Perissocoelia
- Peronella
- Peronidella
- Perplexostroma
- Perissocoelia
- Petalope
- Petraia
- Petroidistroma
- Petrosistroma
- Petrosites
- Petrostroma
- Phacellopegma
- Phalangium
- Phanerochiderma
- Pharetrospongia
- Pheronema
- Phialaspongia
- Phlyctaenium
- Phlyctia
- Phobetractinia
- Pholidocladia
- Phormosella
- Phragmocoelia
- Phragmodictya
- Phrissospongia
- Phyllodermia
- Phymaplecia
- Phymaplectia
- Phymaraphinia
- Phymatella
- Physocalpia
- Physospongia
- Piamaecyathellus
- Pichiostroma
- Pileolites
- Pileospongia
- Pinnatispongia
- Pirania
- Pisothalamia
- Placochlaenia
- Placojerea
- Placonella
- Placoscytus
- Placotrema
- Plakina
- Platiferostroma
- Platispongia
- Platychonia
- Platythalamiella
- Plectascus
- Plecteurette
- Plectinia
- Plectoderma
- Plectodermatium
- Plectospyris
- Plectostroma
- Plectroninia
- Pleroma
- Plethosiphonia
- Pleurochorium
- Pleuromera
- Pleurope
- Pleurophymia
- Pleuropyge
- Pleurostoma
- Plexodictyon
- Plicocyathus
- Pliegatella
- Plinthodermatium
- Plinthosella
- Pliobolia
- Plioboliopsis
- Plococonia
- Plocoscyphia
- Plumatalina
- Pocillospongia
- Podapsis
- Polyactinella
- Polyblastidium
- Polycnemiseudea
- Polycoscinus
- Polycystocoelia
- Polyedra
- Polyendostoma
- Polygonatium
- Polylophidium
- Polyosepia
- Polyplectella
- Polyrhipidium
- Polyrhizophora
- Polyschema
- Polysiphon
- Polysiphonella
- Polysiphospongia
- Polysiponeudea
- Polystigmatium
- Polystoma
- Polysyge
- Polytholosia
- Polythyra
- Polythyris
- Polytretia
- Porefieldia
- Poriferella
- Porkunites
- Porochonia
- Porocoscinus
- Porocypellia
- Porosphaera
- Porosphaerella
- Porospongia
- Postperissocoelia
- Poterionella
- Praeidiostroma
- Praethalamopora
- Precaratoporella
- Precorynella
- Prethmophyllum
- Preverticillites
- Prismodictya
- Procorallistes
- Procyathellus
- Proeuplectella
- Proeurete
- Prohexactinella
- Prokaliapsis
- Promillepora
- Propachastrella
- Propleroma
- Propriolynthus
- Proseliscothon
- Prosiphonella
- Protachilleum
- Protetraclis
- Protoarmstrongia
- Protohyalostelia
- Protoleucon
- Protopharetra
- Protoprisma
- Protospongia
- Protosycon
- Protremadictyon
- Psarodictyon
- Psephosyllogus
- Pseudoactinodictyon
- Pseudoactinostroma
- Pseudoamblysiphonella
- Pseudochaetetes
- Pseudoguadalupia
- Pseudoguettardia
- Pseudohydnoceras
- Pseudoimperatgoria
- Pseudojerea
- Pseudolabechia
- Pseudopalaeoaplysina
- Pseudopemmatites
- Pseudoplocoscyphia
- Pseudoporefieldia
- Pseudoscytalia
- Pseudoseliscothon
- Pseudoseptifer
- Pseudostromatoporella
- Pseudostylodictyon
- Pseudosyringocnema
- Pseudotrupetostroma
- Pseudoverruculina
- Pseudovirgula
- Psilocalyx
- Pterocalpia
- Ptretiosocyathus
- Ptychochaetetes
- Ptychodesia
- Pulchrilamina
- Purisiphonia
- Putapacyathus
- Pycnocalyptra
- Pycnoclonella
- Pycnodesma
- Pycnoidocoscinus
- Pycnoidocyathus
- Pycnopegma
- Pycnospongia
- Pyritonema
- Pyrogochonia
- Pyrospongia
- Pyruspongia

== Q ==
- Quadrolaminiella

== R ==
- Raanespongia
- Rackovskia
- Racodiscula
- Radicanalospongia
- Radicispongia
- Radioplica
- Radiostroma
- Radiothalamos
- Radiotrabeculopora
- Ragadinia
- Rahbahthalmia
- Ramalmerina
- Ramispongia
- Rankenella
- Raphidonema
- Rasetticyathus
- Ratcliffespongia
- Rauffia
- Rectannulus
- Regardrella
- Regispongia
- Regnardia
- Reiswigia
- Reniera
- Retecoscinus
- Retetumulus
- Reticulcoelia
- Reticullina
- Reticullina
- Retifungus
- Rhabdactinia
- Rhabdolynthus
- Rhabdosispongia
- Rhabdospongia
- Rhabdotum
- Rhagosplecion
- Rhakistella
- Rhaxella
- Rhaxelloides
- Rhizocheton
- Rhizomorina
- Rhizopoteronopsis
- Rhizopsis
- Rhizopterion
- Rhizostele
- Rhizotetraclis
- Rhodanospongia
- Rhogostomium
- Rhombedonium
- Rhombodictyon
- Rhopalicna
- Rhopalocoelia
- Rhopaloconus
- Rhopalospongia
- Rhoptrum
- Rhytidoderma
- Riasanospongia
- Rigbyella
- Rigbyetia
- Rigbyspongia
- Ringifungia
- Robertiolynthus
- Robertocyathus
- Robustocyathellus
- Robustocyathus
- Roemerispongia
- Rosella
- Rosenellinella
- Rossocyathella
- Rotundocyathus
- Rozanovicoscinus
- Rozanovicyathus
- Rudanulus
- Russocyathus
- Russospongia
- Rutkowskiella

== S ==
- Saccospongia
- Sadleria
- Saetaspongia
- Sagittularia
- Sahraja
- Sajanocyathus
- Sajanolynthus
- Sakhacyathus
- Salairella
- Salairocyathus
- Salzburgia
- Sanarkocyathus
- Sanarkophyllum
- Sarophora
- Saynospongia
- Scheiia
- Scheiella
- Scheielloides
- Schistodictyon
- Schizolites
- Schrammeniella
- Schumnyicyathus
- Scleritoderma
- Sclerocoelia
- Sclerocyathus
- Sclerokalia
- Scleroplegma
- Sclerothamnopsis
- Scolecosia
- Scolioraphis
- Scribroporella
- Scytalia
- Scythophyma
- Sebargasia
- Sekwicyathus
- Seliscothon
- Semperella
- Senowbaridaryana
- Sentinella
- Septochaetetes
- Seranella
- Sergaelites
- Sestrocladia
- Sestrodictyon
- Sestrostomella
- Shirdagopora
- Shiveligocyathus
- Shuqraia
- Sibirecyathus
- Sigmocoscinus
- Sigmocyathus
- Sigmofungia
- Silicunculus
- Simplexodictyon
- Sinodictyon
- Siphonia
- Siphonocoelia
- Siphostroma
- Solenocoelia
- Sollasia
- Somersetella
- Sontheimia
- Sphaeractinia
- Sphaeriella
- Sphaerocoelia
- Sphaerodictya
- Sphaeropegma
- Sphenaulax
- Spherolichaetetes
- Sphinctonella
- Spinocladia
- Spinosocyathus
- Spinospongia
- Spiractinella
- Spirillicyathella
- Spirolophia
- Spirospongia
- Spitsbergenia
- Spongelites
- Spongeoliomorpha
- Spongiomorpha
- Spongiothecopora
- Sporadoporidium
- Sporadopyle
- Sporadoscinia
- Squamosocyathus
- Stachyodes
- Stachyspongia
- Stamnia
- Staphylopora
- Stapicyathus
- Statanulocyathus
- Stauractinella
- Stauroderma
- Stauronema
- Steinerella
- Steineria
- Steinmanella
- Steliella
- Stellarispongia
- Stelletta
- Stellettites
- Stellispongia
- Stelodictyon
- Stephanella
- Stephanicyathus
- Stephenospongia
- Stereodictyum
- Stevocyathus
- Stichmaptyx
- Stichophyma
- Stictostroma
- Stillicidocyathus
- Stioderma
- Stiodermiella
- Stolleya
- Stramentella
- Stratispongia
- Stratodictyon
- Strephinia
- Streptosolen
- Streptospongia
- Stromaporidium
- Stromatidium
- Stromatoaxinellia
- Stromatocerium
- Stromatodictyon
- Stromatomorpha
- Stromatopora
- Stromatoporella
- Stromatoporellata
- Stromatoporellina
- Stromatoporina
- Stromatorhaxella
- Stromatorhiza
- Stromatospongia
- Stromatostroma
- Stylopegma
- Styloporella
- Stylostroma
- Stylothalamia
- Subascosymplegma
- Subtilocyathus
- Sulcastrella
- Svetlanocyathus
- Sycodictya
- Syltispongia
- Sylviacoscinus
- Synaulia
- Synopella
- Synthetostroma
- Synthetostroma
- Syringocnema
- Syringocyathus
- Syringodictyon
- Syringostroma
- Syringostromella
- Syringostromina
- Syringothalamus

== T ==
- Tabulacyathellus
- Tabulacyathus
- Taeniaecyathellus
- Takakkawia
- Taleastroma
- Talpaspongia
- Taplowia
- Taraxaculum
- Taylorcyathus
- Tchojacyathus
- Tebagathalamia
- Teganium
- Tegerocyathus
- Tennericyathus
- Tercyathellus
- Tercyathus
- Testispongia
- Tetillopsis
- Textispongia
- Thalamnohaliclona
- Thalamocyathus
- Thalamopora
- Thallospongia
- Thamnodictya
- Thamnonema
- Thamnospongia
- Thaumastocoelia
- Thecosiphonia
- Theneopsis
- Theonella
- Tholiasterella
- Thoosa
- Thoracospongia
- Thrombus
- Thyroidium
- Thysanodictya
- Tiddalickia
- Tienodictyon
- Timorella
- Titusvillia
- Tiverina
- Tollicyathus
- Tolminothalamia
- Tologoicyathus
- Toomeyospongia
- Toquimiella
- Toriscodermia
- Torosocyathus
- Tosastroma
- Toulminia
- Trachydictya
- Trachynoton
- Trachyphlyctia
- Trachysinia
- Trachyspecion
- Trachysycon
- Trachytila
- Tragalimus
- Trammeria
- Tremabolites
- Tremadictyon
- Tremaphorus
- Tremospongia
- Tretocalia
- Tretodictyum
- Tretoechus
- Triadocoelia
- Trichospongia
- Trigonostroma
- Trininaecyathus
- Tristratocoelia
- Triticispongia
- Trochobolus
- Trupetostroma
- Tubericyathus
- Tubicoscinus
- Tubispongia
- Tubuliella
- Tubuliporella
- Tumulifungia
- Tumuliolynthus
- Tumulocoscinus
- Tumulocyathus
- Turgidaspongia
- Turonia
- Tuvacnema
- Twenhofelella
- Tylocyathus
- Typhlopleura

== U ==
- Ubiquiradius
- Uphantena
- Uralonema
- Uranosphaera
- Urcyathella
- Urcyathus
- Urnacristata
- Urphaenomenospongia
- Usloncyathus
- Ussuricyathus
- Uvacoelia
- Uvanella
- Uvothalamia

== V ==
- Vaceletia
- Valhalla
- Valospongia
- Varneycoelia
- Vascothalamia
- Vascothalmia
- Vaurealispongia
- Vauxia
- Velellospongia
- Ventriculites
- Vermiculissimum
- Veronicacyathus
- Verrucospongia
- Verruculina
- Verticillites
- Vesicocaulis
- Vetulina
- Vikingia
- Virgaspongia
- Virgula
- Virmula
- Vittia
- Vologdinocyathellus
- Vologdinocyathus

== W ==
- Waagenium
- Wagima
- Walliospongia
- Wanella
- Wapkia
- Wapkiosa
- Wareembra
- Wareiella
- Warrigalia
- Warrriootacyathus
- Welteria
- Wewokella
- Williamicyathus
- Winwoodia
- Wollemannia
- Wongaspongia
- Wrighticyathus

== X ==
- Xestecyathus
- Xizangstromatopora
- Xylospongia

== Y ==
- Yabeodictyon
- Yavorskiina
- Youngella
- Yrrhiza
- Yudjaicyathus
- Yukonella
- Yukonocyathus
- Yukonensis

== Z ==
- Zangerlispongia
- Zanklithalamia
- Zardinia
- Zeravshanella
- Zhuravlevaecyathus
- Zigzagella
- Zittelella
- Zitteleus
- Zittelispongia
- Zittelospongia
- Zlambachella
- Zonacoscinus
- Zonacyathus
- Zunyicyathus
