= Ethmophylloidea =

Ethmophylloidea Temporal range: Cambrian Series 2

Scientific classification
- Kingdom: Animalia
- Phylum: Porifera
- Order: †Ajacicyathida
- Suborder: †Ajacicyathina
- Superfamily: †Ethmophylloidea; Okulitch 1937

Families
- † Carinacyathidae Krasnopeeva 1953; † Ethmophyllidae Okulitch 1937; † Fallocyathidae Rozanov 1969; † Gloriosocyathidae Rozanov 1969; † Kijacyathidae Zhuravleva 1964

Ethmophylloidea is a prehistoric superfamily of sponges in the suborder Ajacicyathina. It was described in 1937, and is known from Cambrian Series 2.
