= Ectyonopsis pluridentata =

Scientific classification
- Kingdom: Animalia
- Phylum: Porifera
- Class: Demospongiae
- Order: Poecilosclerida
- Family: Myxillidae
- Genus: Ectyonopsis
- Species: E. pluridentata

Binomial name
- Ectyonopsis pluridentata (Lévi, 1963)

Synonyms
- Ectyonancora pluridentata Lévi, 1963

Species of demosponge

Ectyonopsis pluridentata, the fused branch sponge, is a species of demosponge from South Africa.

== Description ==
The fused branch sponge is made up of a thick cluster of fused branches arising from an indistinct base. It grows up to 130 mm (5.1 in) long and 160 mm (6.3 in) wide. It is beige to rusty brown in colour. The surface is rough and is covered in small (<1 mm (0.039 in)) circular ostia. While it is firm and compressible, it also breaks easily.

It is a suspension and a filter feeder.

== Distribution and habitat ==
This species is endemic to South Africa. It is found on the South and West coasts of the country, where it lives at depths of 79–201 m (259–659 ft).
