= Guadalupiidae =

Guadalupiidae Temporal range: Pennsylvanian–Norian

Scientific classification
- Kingdom: Animalia
- Phylum: Porifera
- Class: Demospongiae
- Order: Agelasida
- Family: †Guadalupiidae; Girty, 1909

Extinct family of sponges

Guadalupiidae is an extinct family of fossil sponges that lived from the Pennsylvanian (Carboniferous) until the Norian (Late Triassic). It includes the following taxa:

- Cystauletes R. H. King, 1943

- Cystauletes mammilosus R. H. King, 1943

- Cystothalamia Girty, 1908

- Cystothalamia megacysta Finks, 2010
- Cystothalamia nodulifera Girty, 1908

- Diecithalamia Senowbari-Daryan, 1990

- Diecithalamia polysiphonata Dieci et al., 1968

- Exovasa Finks, 2010

- Exovasa cystauletoides Finks, 2010

- Guadalupia Girty, 1908

- Guadalupia auricula Finks, 2010
- Guadalupia cupulosa Finks, 2010
- Guadalupia digitata Girty, 1908
- Guadalupia favosa Girty, 1908
- Guadalupia lepta Finks, 2010
- Guadalupia microcamera Finks, 2010
- Guadalupia minuta Rigby and Bell, 2006
- Guadalupia ramescens Finks, 2010
- Guadalupia vasa Finks, 2010
- Guadalupia williamsi R. H. King, 1943
- Guadalupia zitteliana Girty, 1908

- Incisimura Finks, 2010

- Incisimura bella Finks, 2010

- Lemonea Senowbari-Daryan, 1990

- Lemonea conica Senowbari-Daryan, 1990
- Lemonea cylindrica (Girty, 1908)
- Lemonea polysiphonata Senowbari-Daryan, 1990
- Lemonea simplex Finks, 2010
- "Lemonea" exaulifera (Rigby et al., 1998)
- "Lemonea" micra Rigby et al., 1998

- Polyphymaspongia R. H. King, 1943

- Polyphymaspongia explanata R. H. King, 1943

== See also ==
- List of prehistoric sponges
