= Myxilla ponceti =

Scientific classification
- Kingdom: Animalia
- Phylum: Porifera
- Class: Demospongiae
- Order: Poecilosclerida
- Family: Myxillidae
- Genus: Myxilla
- Species: M. ponceti

Binomial name
- Myxilla ponceti Goodwin, Brewin & Brickle, 2012

Species of sponge

Myxilla ponceti is a species of demosponge first found on the coast of South Georgia island, in the south west Southern Ocean.
