= Fallocyathidae =

Fallocyathidae Temporal range: Early Cambrian

Scientific classification
- Kingdom: Animalia
- Phylum: Porifera
- Clade: †Archaeocyatha
- Order: †Ajacicyathida
- Superfamily: †Ethmophylloidea
- Family: †Fallocyathidae; Rozanov 1969

Type genus
- Fallocyathus Rozanov 1969

Genera
- †Fallocyathus Rozanov 1969; †Sekwicyathus Handfield 1971; †Yukonocyathus Handfield 1971

Extinct family of sponges

Fallocyathidae is a prehistoric family of sponges in the superfamily Ethmophylloidea. It was described in 1969 with type genus Fallocyathus. Fallocyathidae is known from the Early Cambrian.
