= Ectyonopsis ramosa =

Scientific classification
- Domain: Eukaryota
- Kingdom: Animalia
- Phylum: Porifera
- Class: Demospongiae
- Order: Poecilosclerida
- Family: Myxillidae
- Genus: Ectyonopsis
- Species: E. ramosa

Binomial name
- Ectyonopsis ramosa Carter, 1983

Species of sponge

Ectyonopsis ramosa is a species of poriferan of the genus Ectyonopsis. E. ramosa was described by Herbert James Carter in 1883.
