= Ethmophyllidae =

Ethmophyllidae Temporal range: Cambrian Series 2

Scientific classification
- Kingdom: Animalia
- Phylum: Porifera
- Order: †Ajacicyathida
- Superfamily: †Ethmophylloidea
- Family: †Ethmophyllidae; Okulitch 1937

Type genus
- Ethmophyllum Meek 1868

Genera
- †Angaricyathus Zhuravleva 1965; †Aulocricus; †Cordilleracyathus Handfield 1971; †Dupliporocyathus; †Ethmophyllum Meek 1868; †Kolbicyathus; †Parethmophyllum; †Squamosocyathus; †Stephenicyathus Voronova et al. 1987

Ethmophyllidae is a prehistoric family of sponges in the superfamily Ethmophylloidea. It was described in 1937 with type genus Ethmophyllum. Ethmophyllidae is known from Cambrian Series 2, and has been found across North America and Russia.
