= Moret =

Moret may refer to:

- David Moret (born 1979), Swiss judoka
- Didier Moret (born 1975), Swiss ski mountaineer
- Isabelle Moret, Swiss politician
- Léon Moret (1890–1972), French geologist and paleontologist
- Neil Moret, pseudonym of composer Charles N. Daniels
- Norbert Moret, Swiss composer
- Pablo Moret (1933–2025), Argentine actor
- Roger Moret (1949–2020) Puerto Rican professional baseball player
- Segismundo Moret (1833–1913), Spanish politician and writer
- Moret (grape), another name for the French wine grape Gouget noir
- Moret (district), a former district in Ethiopia
- Moret-sur-Loing, a former commune in the Seine-et-Marne department in the Île-de-France region in north-central France
