= Raphidonema =

Raphidonema is the scientific name of two genera and may refer to:

- Raphidomena (alga), a genus of algae in the family Koliellaceae
- Raphidomena (sponge), a genus of sponges
