= Myxilla fusca =

Scientific classification
- Domain: Eukaryota
- Kingdom: Animalia
- Phylum: Porifera
- Class: Demospongiae
- Order: Poecilosclerida
- Family: Myxillidae
- Genus: Myxilla
- Species: M. fusca

Binomial name
- Myxilla fusca Whitelegge, 1906

Synonyms
- Dendoryx fusca Whitelegge, 1906

Species of sponge

Myxilla fusca is a species of demosponge first found on the coast of New South Wales.
