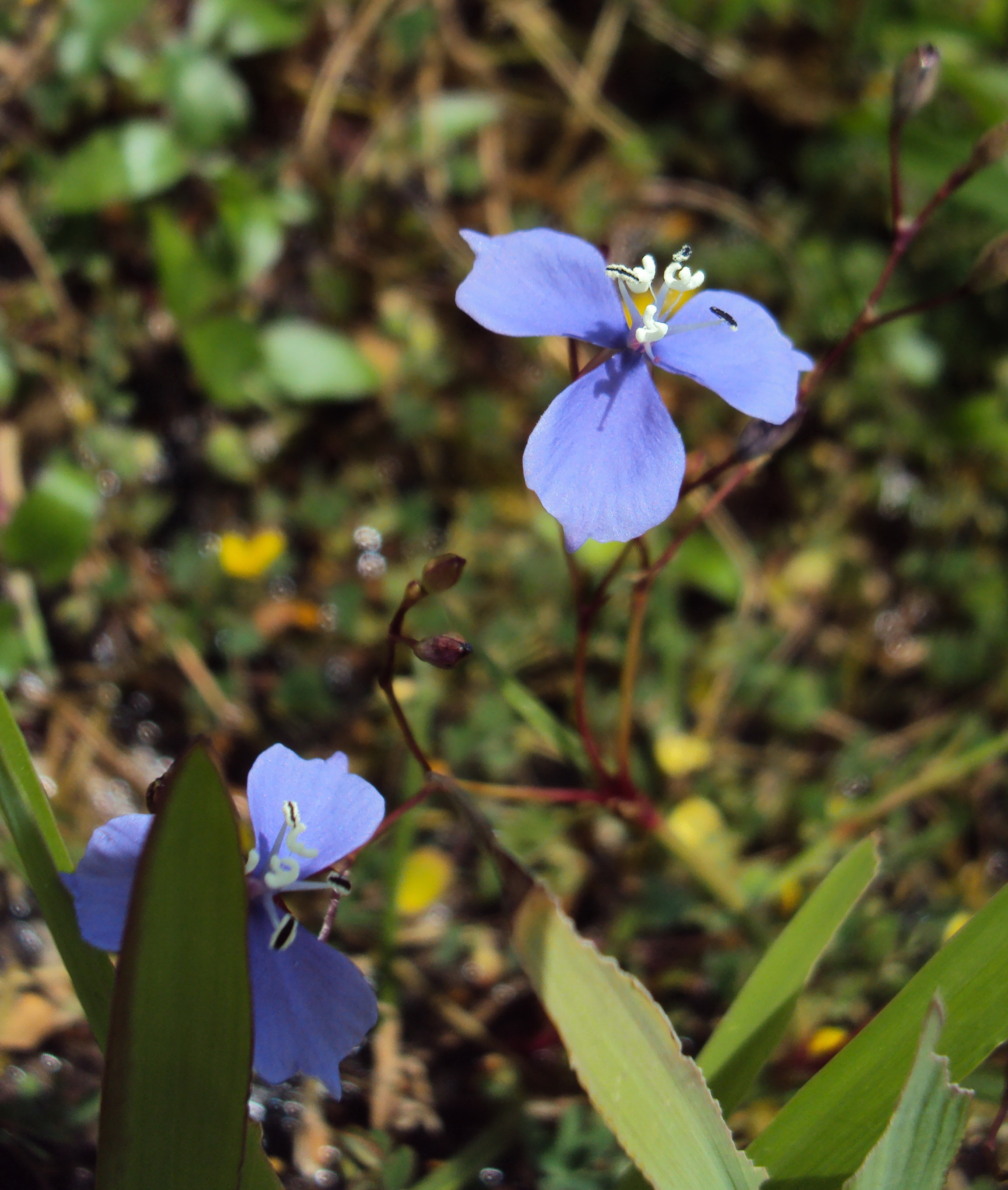

Scientific classification
- Kingdom: Plantae
- Clade: Tracheophytes
- Clade: Angiosperms
- Clade: Monocots
- Clade: Commelinids
- Order: Commelinales
- Family: Commelinaceae
- Genus: Murdannia
- Species: M. semiteres

Binomial name
- Murdannia semiteres (Dalzell) Santapau

Synonyms
- Aneilema semiteres Dalzell; Dichoespermum semiteres (Dalzell) Hassk.

= Murdannia semiteres =

Species of flowering plant

Murdannia semiteres, the panicled dewflower, is a species of flowering plant in the family Commelinaceae. It is an annual erect herb with reddish branches that grows in the seasonally dry tropical biome. The leaves are threadlike, folded, and smooth. It bears blue flowers in panicles with three free sepals. It is native to east-central Africa (Democratic Republic of the Congo, Uganda, Kenya, Rwanda, Burundi, Tanzania, and Zambia), Yemen, Iran, India, and Vietnam.

== Distribution ==
Grows gregariously in habitats near permanently moist, exposed rocks and along stream banks in peninsular India.

== Subspecies ==
Four subspecies are accepted.

- Murdannia semiteres subsp. brenanii Nandikar – Burundi, Democratic Republic of the Congo, Kenya, Rwanda, Tanzania, Uganda, and Zambia
- Murdannia semiteres subsp. juncoides (Wight) Nandikar & Gurav – southwestern India
- Murdannia semiteres subsp. sahyadrica (Ancy & Nampy) Nandikar & Gurav – western India (Maharashtra)
- Murdannia semiteres subsp. semiteres – Yemen, Iran, India, and Vietnam
