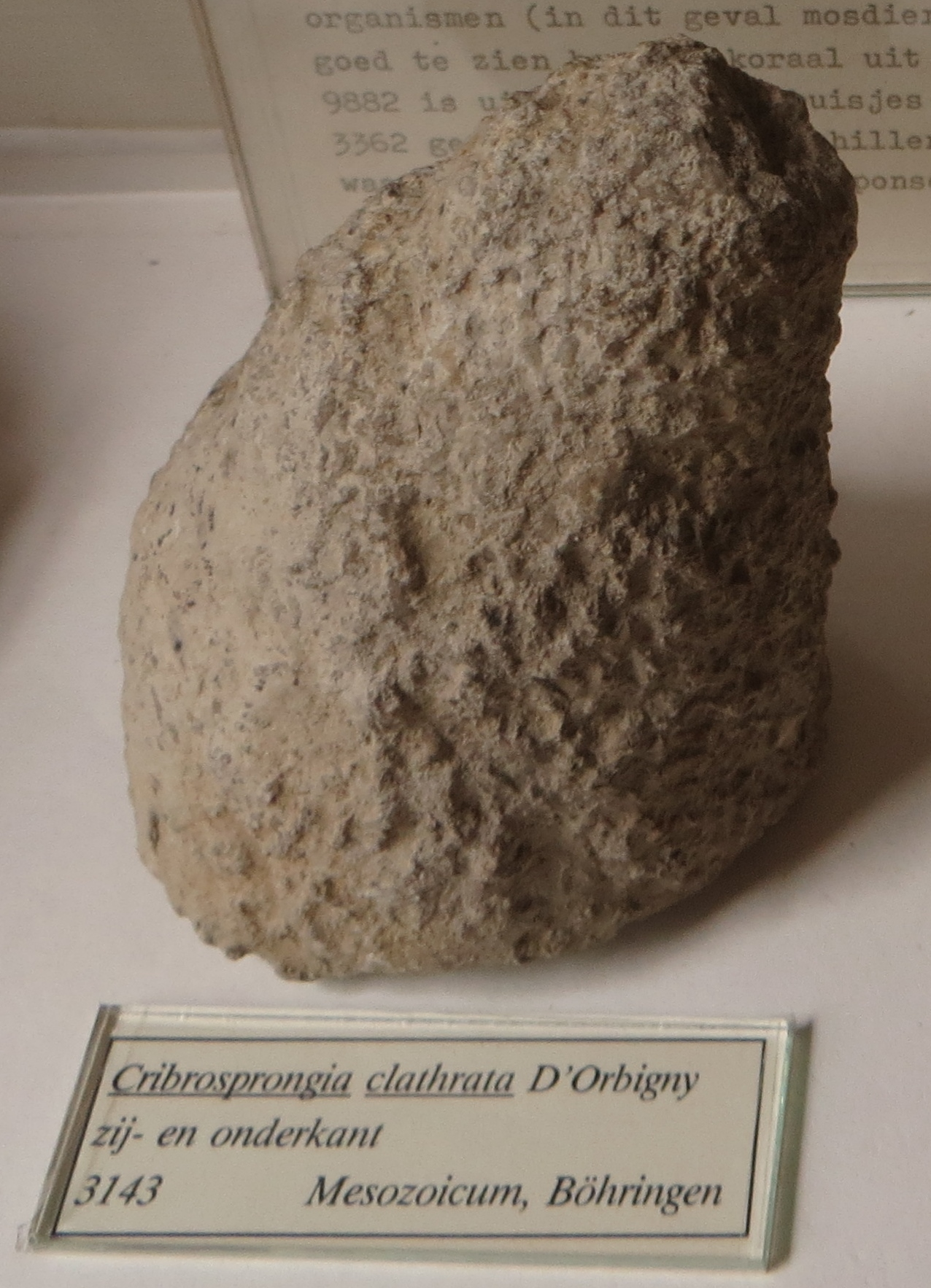
- †Cribrospongia clathrata at Teylers Museum, Haarlem

Scientific classification
- Domain: Eukaryota
- Kingdom: Animalia
- Phylum: Porifera
- Class: Hexactinellida
- Order: Sceptrulophora
- Family: Cribrospongiidae; Roemer, 1864

Genera
- Several fossil genera, one extant genus: †Cribrospongia; Stereochlamis

= Cribrospongiidae =

Cribrospongiidae Temporal range: 456.1–Present Ma

Family of sponges

Cribrospongiidae is a family of glass sponges in the order Sceptrulophora.
