= Clathrodictyella =

Clathrodictyella Temporal range: Silurian (Ludlow Epoch)

Scientific classification
- Kingdom: Animalia
- Phylum: Porifera
- Class: †Stromatoporoidea
- Order: †Amphiporida
- Family: †Amphiporaidae
- Genus: †Clathrodictyella; Bogoyavlenskaya, 1965

Type species
- Amphipora turkestanica Lessovaja, 1962

Extinct genus of sponges

Clathrodictyella is an extinct genus of sea sponges from the Silurian (Ludlow Epoch) of Eastern Europe and Central Asia. It is a member of the order Amphiporida in the extinct class Stromatoporoidea.

== See also ==
- List of prehistoric sponge genera
