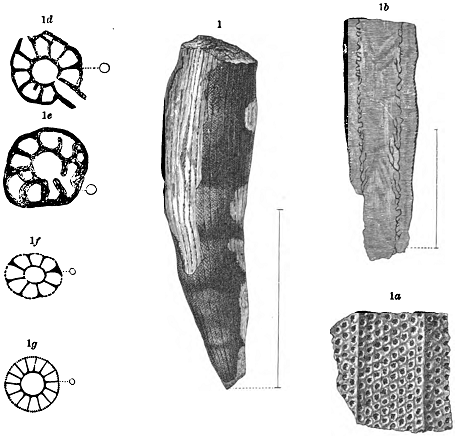
- E. whitneyi

Scientific classification
- Kingdom: Animalia
- Phylum: Porifera
- Order: †Ajacicyathida
- Family: †Ethmophyllidae
- Genus: †Ethmophyllum

= Ethmophyllum =

Extinct genus of sponges

Ethmophyllum is an extinct genus of sea sponge known from the Cambrian period.
