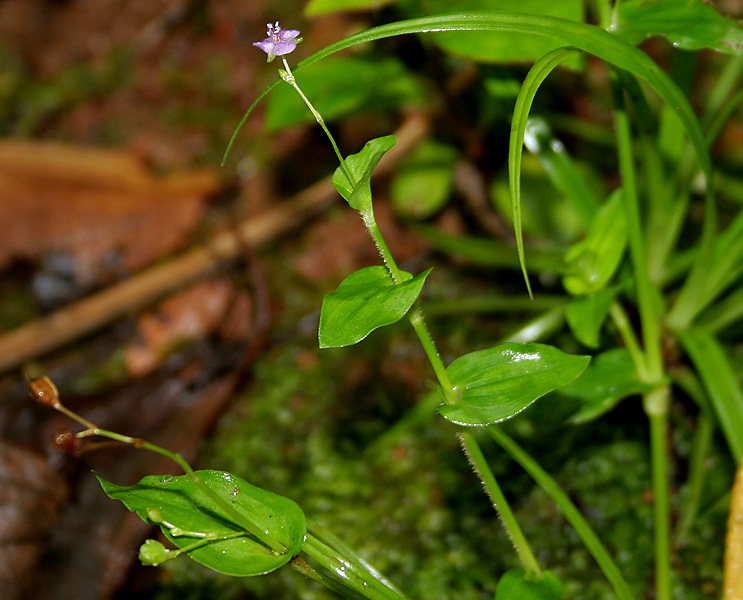

Conservation status
- Least Concern (IUCN 3.1)

Scientific classification
- Kingdom: Plantae
- Clade: Tracheophytes
- Clade: Angiosperms
- Clade: Monocots
- Clade: Commelinids
- Order: Commelinales
- Family: Commelinaceae
- Genus: Murdannia
- Species: M. spirata

Binomial name
- Murdannia spirata (L.) G.Brückn.

Synonyms
- Aneilema canaliculatum Dalzell; Aneilema melanostictum Hance; Aneilema nanum (Roxb.) Kunth; Aneilema spiratum (L.) R.Br.; Aneilema spiratum (L.) Sweet; Aphylax spiralis (L.) Salisb.; Commelina bracteolata Lam.; Commelina nana Roxb.; Commelina pumila Royle ex C.B.Clarke; Commelina spirata L.; Phaeneilema spiratum (L.) G.Brückn.; Streptylis bracteolata (Lam.) Raf.

= Murdannia spirata =

Species of flowering plant

Murdannia spirata, common name Asiatic dewflower, is a tropical plant species native to China, India, Southeast Asia and the islands of the Pacific. It is now also naturalized in Florida, first collected there from the wild in 1965. In Asia, it is found in forests and in wet wastelands, often along streams. In Florida, it has been collected from palm hummocks and marshes in and just north of the Everglades.

Murdannia spirata is a perennial herb with narrowly ovate to lanceolate clasping leaves and pale blue flowers.
