= Amphiporida =

Amphiporida Temporal range: Ludlow–Famennian Possible records from the Wenlock epoch

Scientific classification
- Kingdom: Animalia
- Phylum: Porifera
- Class: †Stromatoporoidea
- Order: †Amphiporida; Rukhin, 1938
- Family: †Amphiporaidae; Rukhin, 1938

Extinct order of sponges

Amphiporida is an extinct order of stromatoporoid sponges which lived from the mid-late Silurian (Wenlock or Ludlow epochs) to the Late Devonian (Famennian stage). Most amphiporids can be easily distinguished by their dendroid (bush-shaped) form, resembling a thicket of thin branches. Each 'branch' has an external frame-like 'sheath' surrounding the internal structure. Pillars (rods diverging up and away from the axis of growth) and isolated longitudinal canals are typical internal components, though the overall texture is more irregular than in other stromatoporoids. Laminae (flat layers) or cyst plates (convex layers) perpendicular to the axis of growth may also develop in some species.

Amphiporida is an order with low diversity, and most species were restricted to waters corresponding to modern Asia. Nevertheless, some species of Amphipora managed to become widespread and abundant reef-builders during the Frasnian stage of the Late Devonian. The order contains a single family, Amphiporaidae. The family was previously spelled "Amphiporidae", but this was emended by the ICZN in 2013 to prevent confusion with a family of ribbon worms.

== Taxonomy ==
- Family Amphiporaidae Rukhin, 1938 (emended 2013)
  - Amphipora Schulz, 1883 [middle Silurian (Wenlock?) – Late Devonian (Famennian)]
  - Clathrodictyella Bogoyavlenskaya, 1965 [late Silurian (Ludlow)]
  - Euryamphipora Klovan, 1966 [Middle Devonian (Givetian) – Late Devonian (Frasnian)]
  - Novitella Bogoyavlenskaya, 1984 [Late Devonian (Frasnian)]
  - Paramphipora Yavorsky, 1955 [middle Silurian (Wenlock?) – Late Devonian (Famennian?)]
