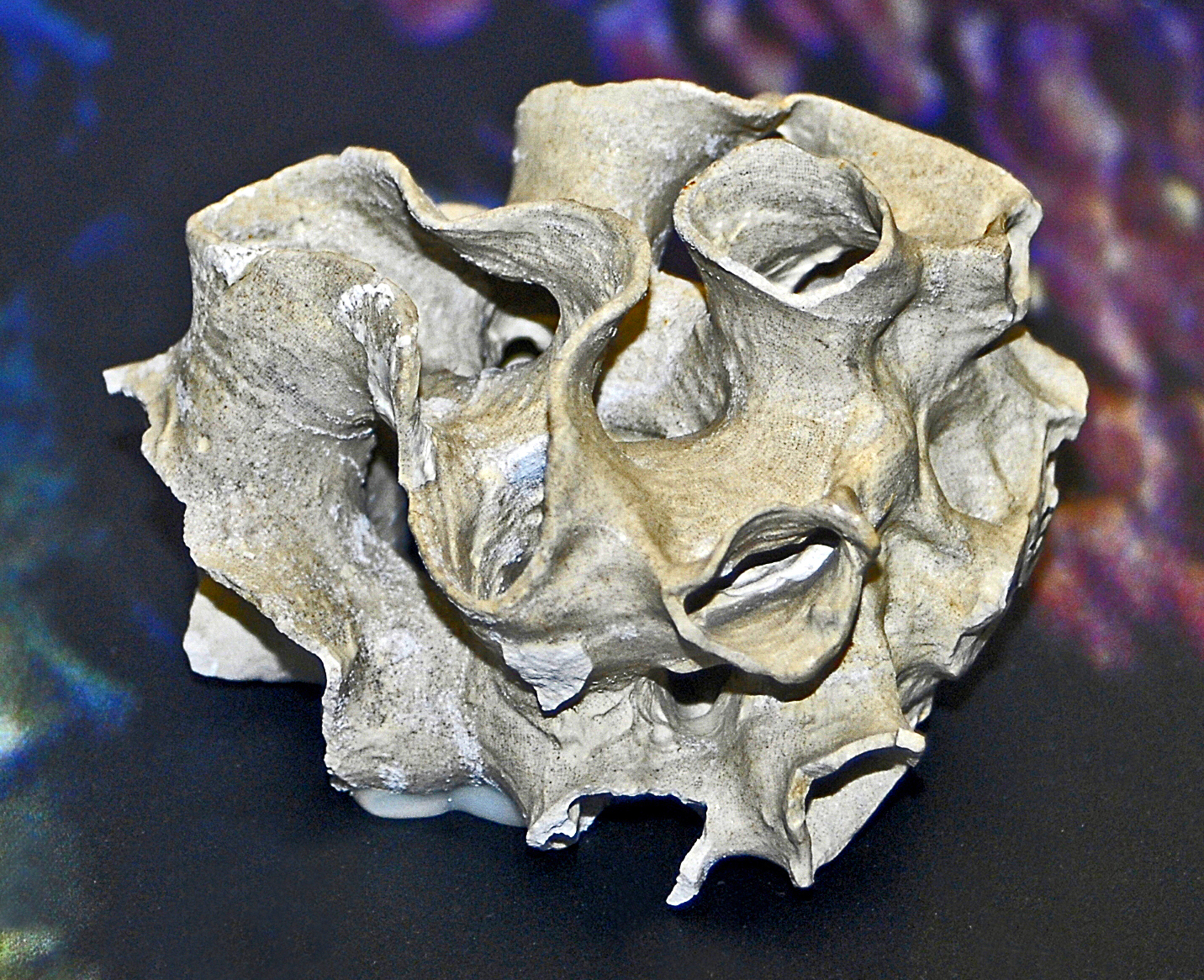
- Fossil of Plocoscyphia labrosa from

Scientific classification
- Domain: Eukaryota
- Kingdom: Animalia
- Phylum: Porifera
- Class: Hexactinellida
- Order: Lychniscosida
- Family: †Callodictyonidae
- Genus: †Plocoscyphia; Reuss, 1846

= Plocoscyphia =

Extinct genus of sponges

Plocoscyphia is an extinct genus of sea sponges belonging to the family Callodictyonidae.

== Fossil records ==
This genus is known in the fossil record from the Permian period to the Eocene (age range from 254.0 to 37.2 million years ago). Fossils of species within this genus have been found in Europe and China.

== Species ==
- Plocoscyphia centuncula Schrammen 1912
- Plocoscyphia communis Moret 1925
- Plocoscyphia elegans Smith 1848
- Plocoscyphia fenestrata Smith and Toulmin 1848
- Plocoscyphia gaultina Moret 1925
- Plocoscyphia labrosa T. Smith
- Plocoscyphia maaki Schrammen 1912
- Plocoscyphia roemeri Leonhard 1897
