= Exovasa =

Exovasa Temporal range: Permian

Scientific classification
- Domain: Eukaryota
- Kingdom: Animalia
- Phylum: Porifera
- Class: Demospongiae
- Order: Agelasida
- Family: †Guadalupiidae
- Genus: †Exovasa; Finks, 2010

Extinct genus of sponges

Exovasa is an extinct genus of sea sponge in the family Guadalupiidae, that existed during the Permian Period in what is now Texas, United States. It was named by Robert M. Finks in 2010, and the type species is Exovasa cystauletoides.
