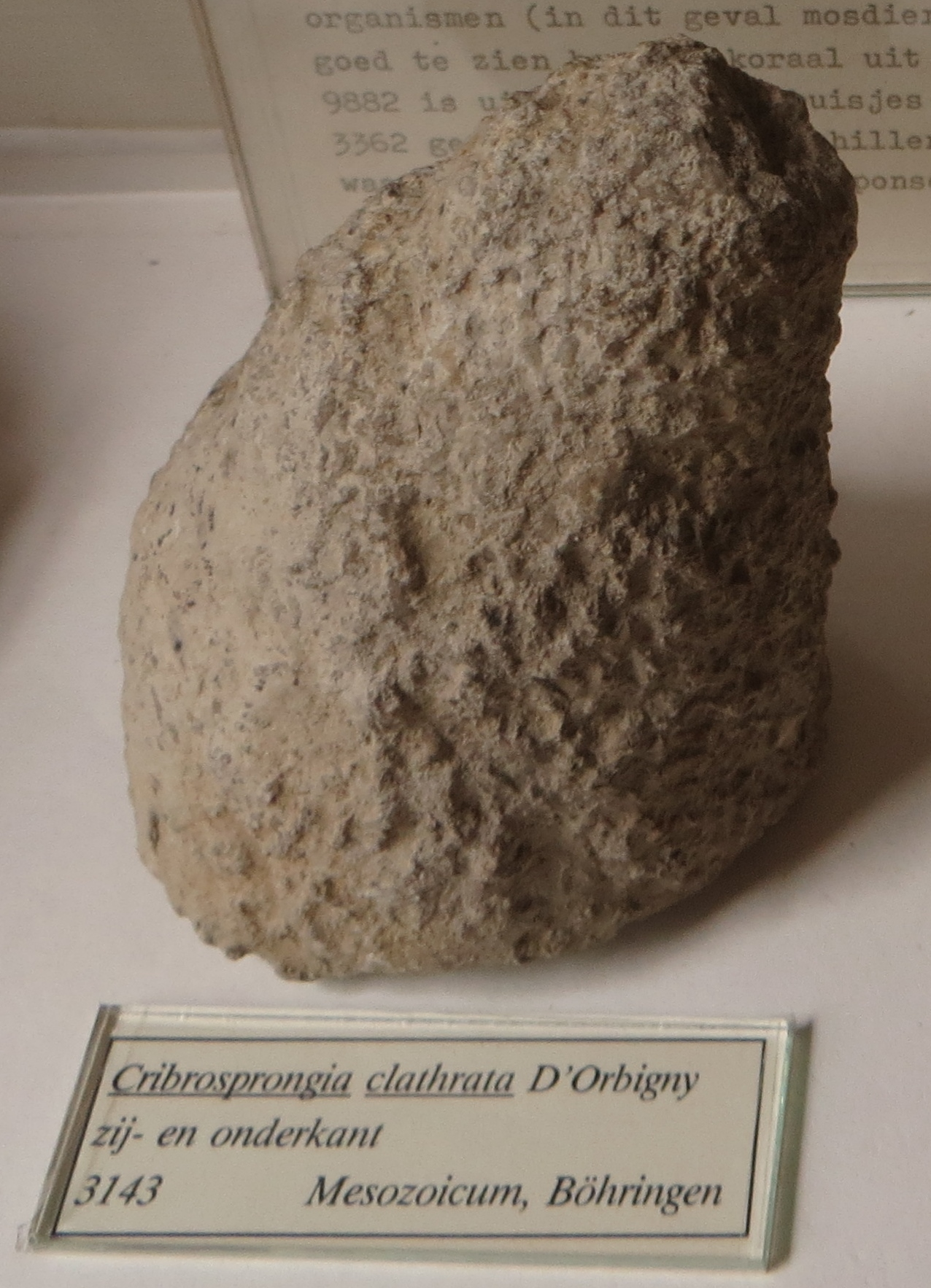
- Cribrospongia clathrata at Teylers Museum, Haarlem

Scientific classification
- Kingdom: Animalia
- Phylum: Porifera
- Class: Hexactinellida
- Order: Sceptrulophora
- Family: Cribrospongiidae
- Genus: †Cribrospongia d'Orbigny, 1849

Species
- †Cribrospongia clathrata d'Orbigny, 1849; †Cribrospongia elegans (Schrammen, 1937), syn. Tremadictyon elegans; †Cribrospongia reticulata (Goldfuss, 1826); †Tremadictyon roemeri Assmann, 1937

Synonyms
- †Tremadictyon Zittel, 1877

= Cribrospongia =

Cribrospongia Temporal range: 247.2–93.5 Ma

Extinct genus of sponges

Cribrospongia is an extinct genus of prehistoric sponges in the family Cribrospongiidae. The species C. elegans is from the Jurassic period and has been found in Germany.

== See also ==
- List of prehistoric sponge genera
