= Amphipora =

Amphipora Temporal range: Silurian to Devonian

Scientific classification
- Domain: Eukaryota
- Kingdom: Animalia
- Phylum: Porifera
- Class: †Stromatoporoidea
- Order: †Amphiporida
- Family: †Amphiporaidae
- Genus: †Amphipora; Schulz, 1883

Species
- see text

Extinct genus of sponges

Amphipora is an extinct genus of sponges, and type genus of the extinct family Amphiporaidae. Species are known from the Silurian to Devonian, over much of the northern hemisphere.

== Species ==
- Amphipora amplusa
- Amphipora aperta
- Amphipora moravica
- Amphipora ninglangensis
- Amphipora ramosa
- Amphipora rhapida
- Amphipora vacuite

== See also ==
- List of prehistoric sponge genera
