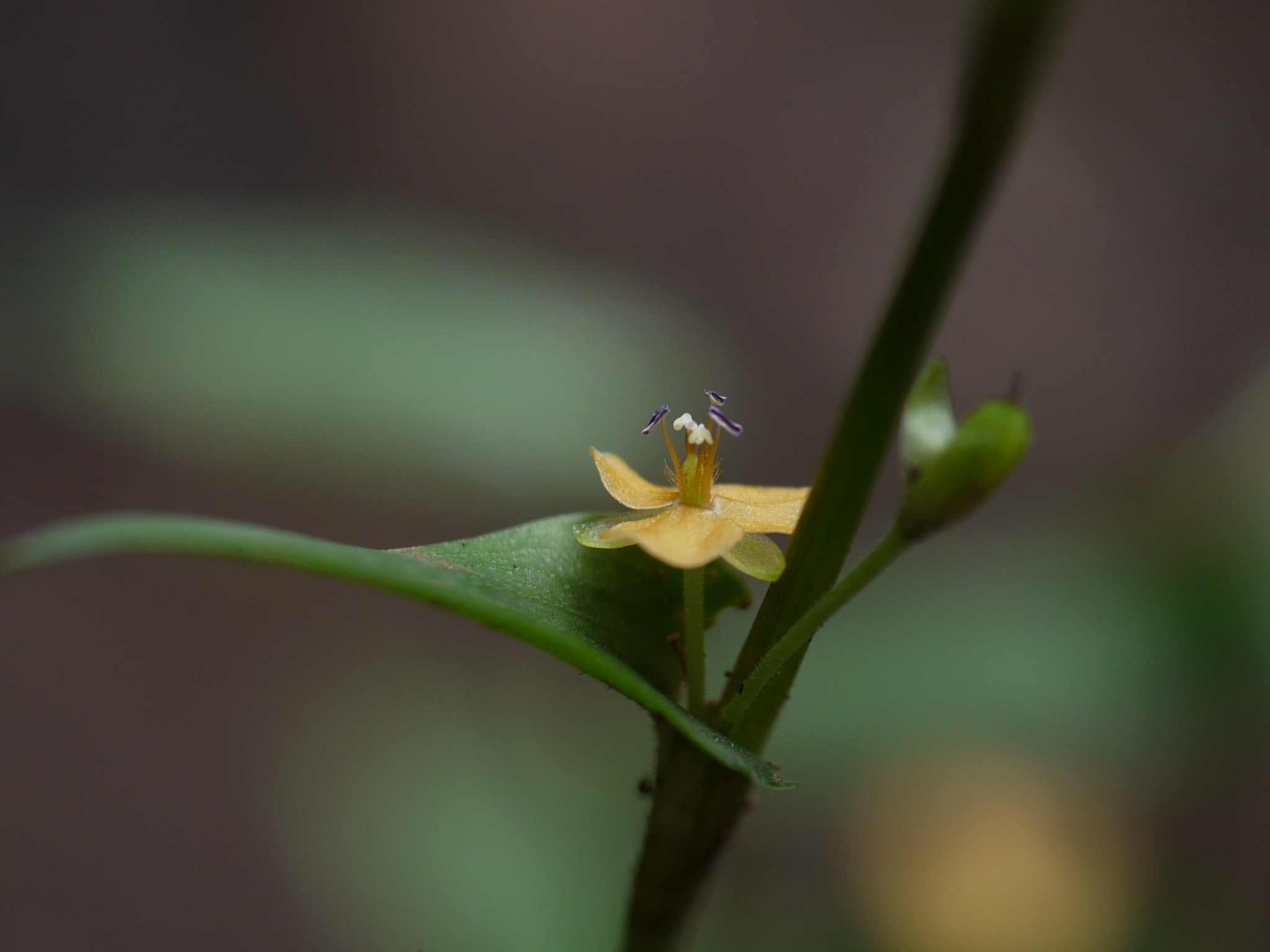

Scientific classification
- Kingdom: Plantae
- Clade: Tracheophytes
- Clade: Angiosperms
- Clade: Monocots
- Clade: Commelinids
- Order: Commelinales
- Family: Commelinaceae
- Genus: Murdannia
- Species: M. crocea

Binomial name
- Murdannia crocea (Griff.) Faden

Synonyms
- Aneilema crocea Griff.

= Murdannia crocea =

Species of flowering plant

Murdannia crocea is a flowering plant in the family Commelinaceae.

== Description ==
This species is an annual, ascending to erect herb, growing 10–25 cm tall.

== Phenology ==
Flowering and fruiting occur from July to October. Flowers open around 9:30 a.m. and fade by approximately 1:30 p.m.
