= Acanothyia =

Acanothyia Temporal range: Cretaceous (Cenomanian)

Scientific classification
- Kingdom: Animalia
- Phylum: Porifera
- Class: Hexactinellida
- Genus: †Acanothyia; Pomel, 1872

Type species
- Camerospongia polydactyla Roemer, 1964

Extinct genus of sponges

Acanothyia is an extinct genus of sea sponge from the Cretaceous (Cenomanian) of Germany. It is potentially a glass sponge in the class Hexactinellida.

== See also ==
- List of prehistoric sponge genera
