= Sekwicyathus =

Sekwicyathus Temporal range: Lower Cambrian 525–515 Ma

Scientific classification
- Kingdom: Animalia
- Phylum: Porifera
- Order: †Ajacicyathida
- Family: †Fallocyathidae
- Genus: †Sekwicyathus
- Species: †S. nahanniensis

Binomial name
- †Sekwicyathus nahanniensis Handfield, 1971

Extinct species of sponge-like organism

Sekwicyathus is a genus of Archaeocyathan poriferan. Archaeocyaths are a taxon of extinct organism that lived in warm, tropical waters during the Early Cambrian period and built reef-like structures in the oceans. They are cup-shaped, with internal and external walls that form a filter feeding system. It is unclear as to whether Archaeocyaths are animals, plants, or some other type of organism. They are similar to modern-day sponges but share traits with other organisms as well. There are 309 discovered genera of Archaeocyaths.

== Discovery ==
Sekwicyathus was first discovered in 1939 by R. Bedford and J. Bedford. It is in the order of Ajacicyathida, the sub-order of Ajacicyathina, the superfamily of Ethmophylloidea, and the family of Fallocyathidae. It was classified into the order and suborder in 1939 by R. Bedford and J. Bedford, into the superfamily by Okulitch in 1937, and family in 1969 by Rozanov. It was fully named Sekwicyathus nahanniensis by Handfield in 1971.

== Morphology ==
Each Archaeocyath is distinguished by the differences in the internal and external walls, as well as by the intervallum. S. nahanniensis has two walls. S. nahanniensis' outer wall has horizontal carcass canal tubes, no external plates, bumps, or additional sheath on the external structure. It has stipules, the carcass perforations are canals, and the outer wall is well defined. The internal structure has a simple structure, with pores on the inner walls, and no stippling or additional sheath. In the intervallum, there are intervallar cells and septa, but no tabulae. S. nahanniensis is a solitary organism.

== Geographic distribution ==
Sekwicyathus nahanniensis is found in Canada, Europe, Russia, and the United States.
