= Incisimura =

Scientific classification
- Domain: Eukaryota
- Kingdom: Animalia
- Phylum: Porifera
- Class: Demospongiae
- Order: Agelasida
- Family: †Guadalupiidae
- Genus: †Incisimura; Finks, 2010

Extinct genus of sponges

Incisimura is an extinct genus of sea sponges in the family Guadalupiidae, that existed during the Permian period in what is now Texas, United States. It was described by Robert M. Finks in 2010, and the type species is Incisimura bella.
