= Ectyonopsis =

Scientific classification
- Kingdom: Animalia
- Phylum: Porifera
- Class: Demospongiae
- Order: Poecilosclerida
- Family: Myxillidae
- Genus: Ectyonopsis; Carter, 1883

Type species
- Ectyonopsis ramosa Carter, 1883

Species
- See text.

Synonyms
- Ectyonancora Lévi, 1963; Ectyonopis; Stelotrochota Bakus, 1966

Genus of sponges

Ectyonopsis is a genus of demosponges in the family Myxillidae. They are mostly known from the waters surrounding Australia and from the Southern Ocean.

== Description ==
This species was originally created for Ectyonopsis ramosa, an Australian species with acanthostyles (spiny styles (spicules with end pointed and the other rounded)) and acanthostrongyles (spiny strongyles (megascleres with both ends rounded)) that form a choanosomal isotropic structure. The genus Ectyonancora, which contained two South African species with acanthostyles, acanthostrongyles, ectosomal tornotes (spicules with both ends sharply pointed), and isochelae spicules (spicules with both ends alike) with protruding processes, was later synonymised with this genus.

All the species in this genus share several features. The tornotes are smooth with triangular/sharply pointed ends. Thick, heavily spined styles are isotopically reticulated and are covered by thick acanthostyles. The microscleres are robust isochelae with processes and broad rounded ends.

== Species ==
The following species are recognised:

- Ectyonopsis flabellata (Lévi, 1963)
- Ectyonopsis hartmani (Bakus, 1966)
- Ectyonopsis panis (Boury-Esnault & van Beveren, 1982)
- Ectyonopsis pluridentata (Lévi, 1963)
- Ectyonopsis ramosa Carter, 1883
- Ectyonopsis ruthae (Mothes & Lerner, 1995)
- Ectyonopsis sigmata Aguilar-Camacho & Carballo, 2012
