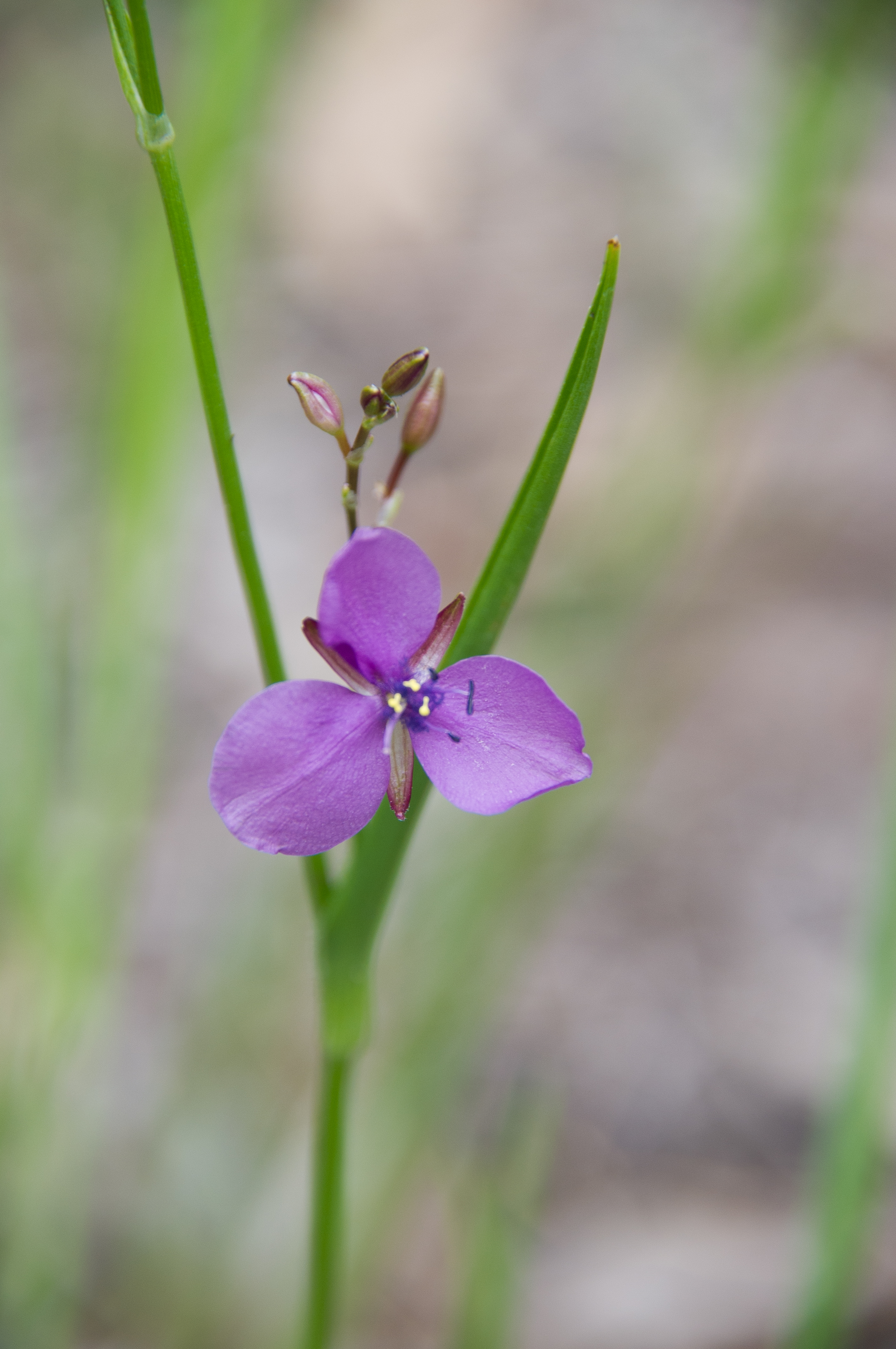

Scientific classification
- Kingdom: Plantae
- Clade: Tracheophytes
- Clade: Angiosperms
- Clade: Monocots
- Clade: Commelinids
- Order: Commelinales
- Family: Commelinaceae
- Genus: Murdannia
- Species: M. graminea

Binomial name
- Murdannia graminea (R.Br.) G.Brückn.

= Murdannia graminea =

Grass lily

Species of flowering plant

Murdannia graminea is a species of flowering plant commonly known as grass lily, in the family Commelinaceae. It is an upright perennial herb with mauve to purple flowers and grows in New South Wales, Queensland, Western Australia and the Northern Territory.

== Description ==
Murdannia graminea is an upright, tufting perennial herb with tuberous roots and ascending stems, up 10–60 cm (3.9–23.6 in) high. Most of the leaves rise from the base, occasionally with a few aerial stems, linear, distinctly veined, 5–30 cm (2.0–11.8 in) long, 2–11 mm (0.079–0.433 in) wide, usually rough to softly hairy and acute at the apex. The flowers are borne in small clusters at the end of stems and have three rounded, mauve, blue or white petals and slender pedicels 3–10 mm (0.12–0.39 in) long. Flowering occurs from December to April and the fruit is an ellipsoid-shaped and 6–10 mm (0.24–0.39 in) long.

== Taxonomy and naming ==
This species was described in 1810 by Robert Brown who gave it the name Aneilema gramineum. In 1930 German botanist Gustav Brückner changed the name to Murdannia graminea and the description was published in Die Naturlichen Pflanzenfamilien. The specific epithet (gramineum) means "grass-like".

== Distribution and habitat ==
Grass lily grows in woodlands, sclerophyll forest in wetter locations in New South Wales, Queensland, Western Australia and the Northern Territory.

== Gallery ==
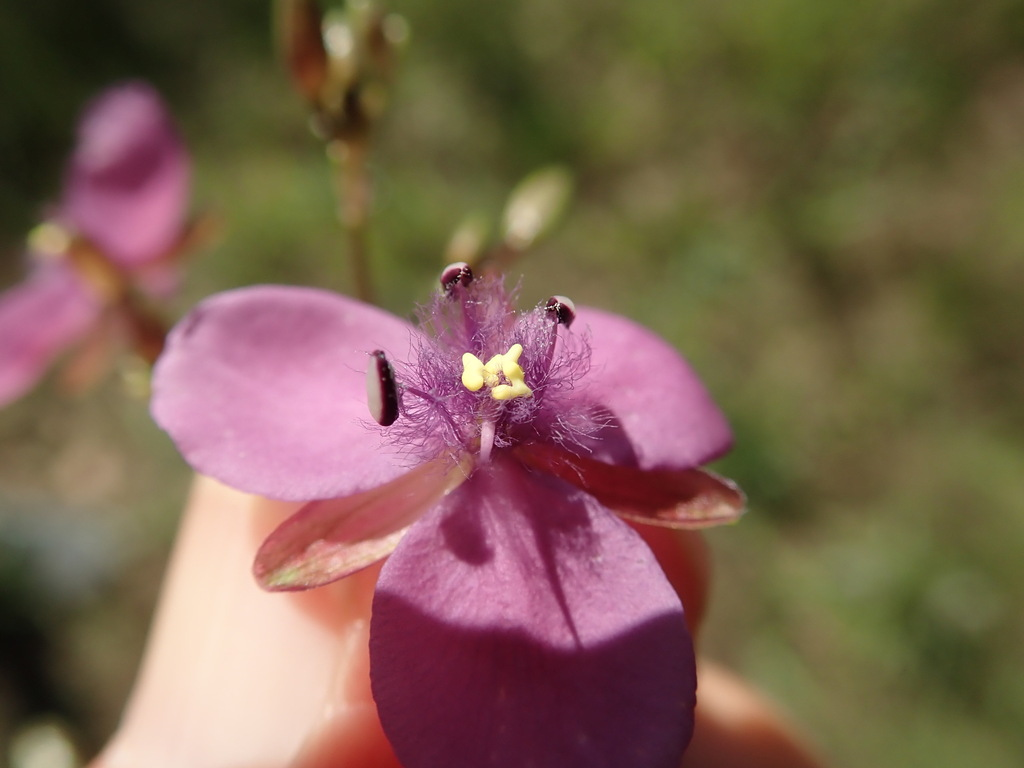
showing the feathery anther filaments and staminodes

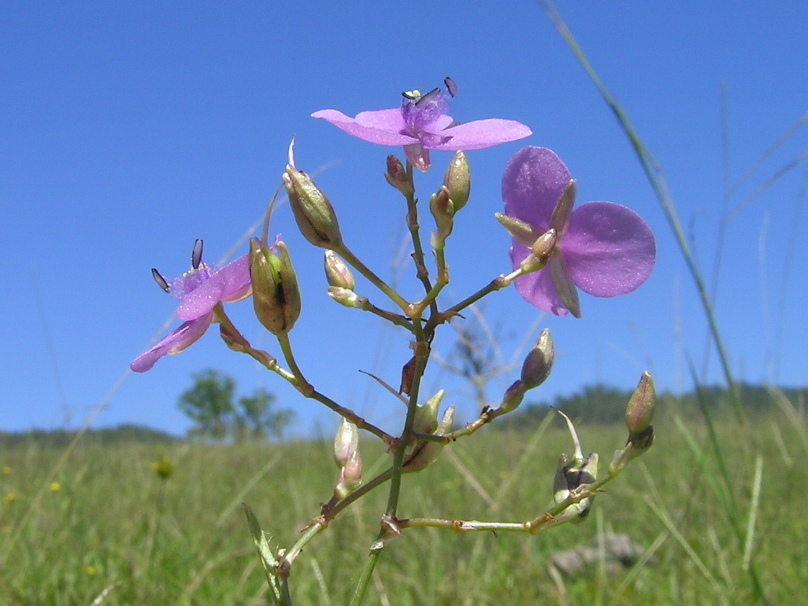
the flower panicles
