= Murdannia sepalosa =

Scientific classification
- Kingdom: Plantae
- Clade: Tracheophytes
- Clade: Angiosperms
- Clade: Monocots
- Clade: Commelinids
- Order: Commelinales
- Family: Commelinaceae
- Subfamily: Commelinoideae
- Tribe: Commelineae
- Genus: Murdannia
- Species: M. sepalosa

Binomial name
- Murdannia sepalosa (C.B.Clarke) C.K.Lee, Fuse & M.N.Tamura (2021)

Synonyms
- Aneilema sepalosum C.B.Clarke (1881); Anthericopsis fischeri Engl. (1895); Anthericopsis sepalosa (C.B.Clarke) Engl. (1897); Anthericopsis tradescantioides Chiov. (1951); Gillettia sepalosa (C.B.Clarke) Rendle (1951)

Genus of flowering plants

Murdannia sepalosa is a species of flowering plant in the family Commelinaceae. It is a tuberous perennial geophyte native to central and eastern Africa (Ethiopia, Somalia, Tanzania, Kenya, Democratic Republic of the Congo, Zambia, Mozambique, and Malawi).
