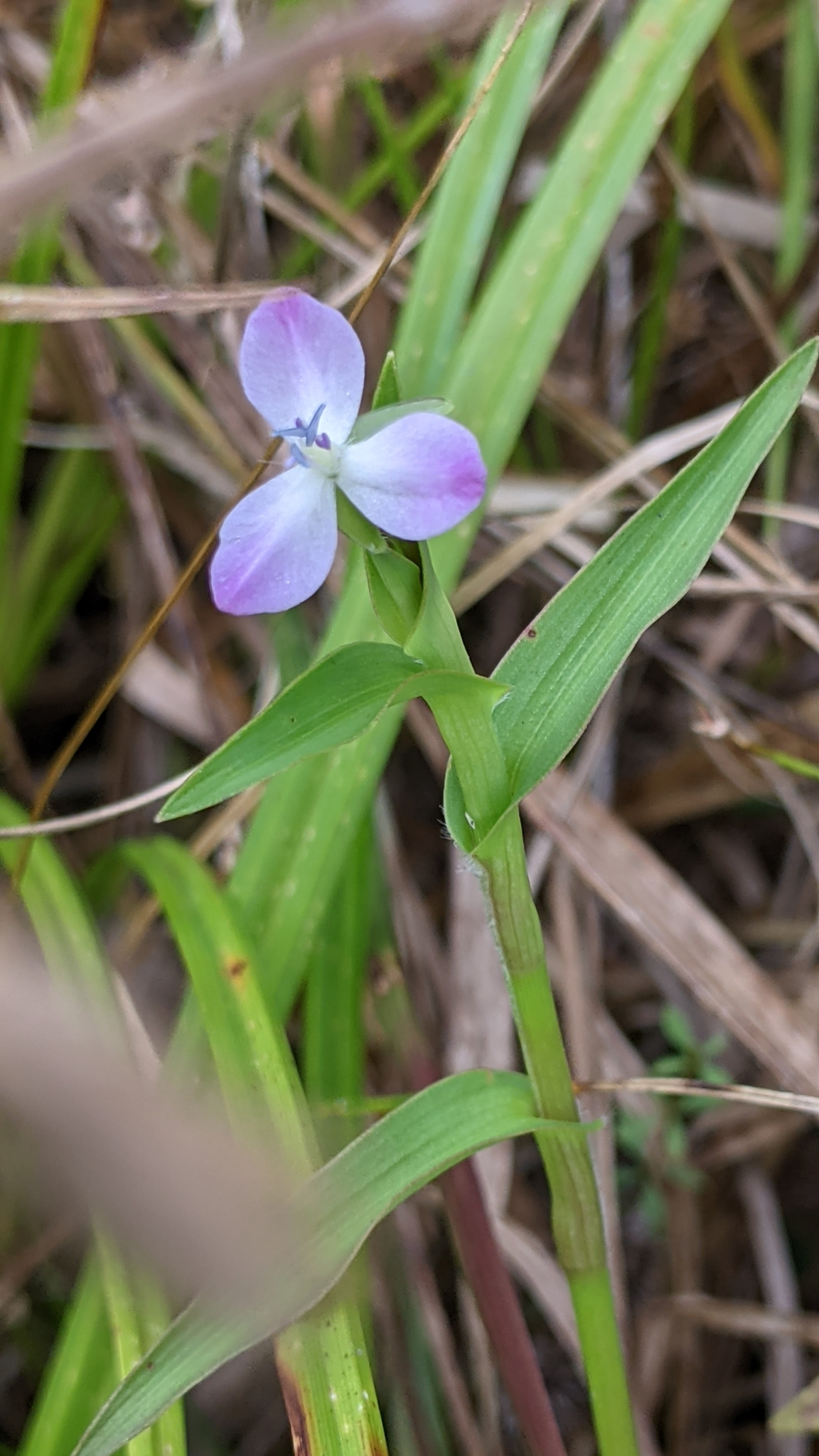

Scientific classification
- Kingdom: Plantae
- Clade: Tracheophytes
- Clade: Angiosperms
- Clade: Monocots
- Clade: Commelinids
- Order: Commelinales
- Family: Commelinaceae
- Genus: Murdannia
- Species: M. keisak

Binomial name
- Murdannia keisak (Hasskarl) Hand.-Mazz

Synonyms
- Aneilema keisak Hassk.

= Murdannia keisak =

Species of plant

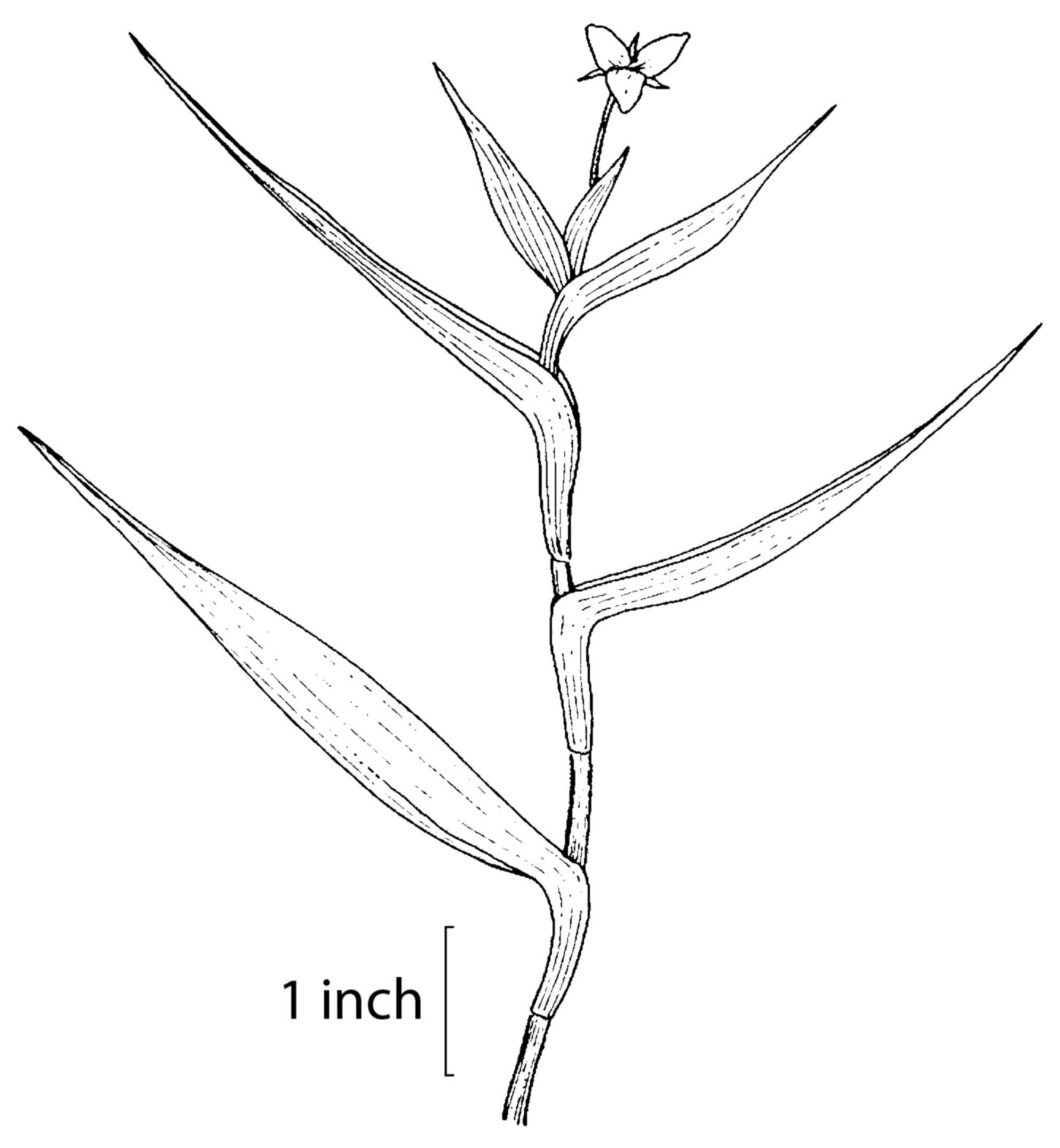
Leaf structure and flower

Murdannia keisak, the marsh dewflower, is an annual, emergent plant in the family Commelinaceae. It is known by several other common names, including aneilema, wart-removing herb, Asian spiderwort, and marsh dayflower. The alternate-leaved plant has succulent, prostrate stems 12 to 20 inches long, and forms new roots at the lower nodes. Three-petaled, perfect flowers, white to bluish-purple or pink, are found in the upper leaf axils and at the ends of stems. The fruit is a capsule with several small seeds. A plant of freshwater marshes and the edges of ponds and streams, Murdannia keisak is associated with the growing of rice in east Asia, where it is native to China, Japan, Korea, and Tibet.

Murdannia keisak is an introduced species in the United States. First records in Louisiana and South Carolina date from the 1920s and 1930s. It is most likely that Murdannia keisak accompanied rice imported for agriculture. Evidence also suggests that the plant was present decades before its first collection. Populations are established in the mid-Atlantic and southeastern US, from New Jersey to Florida and west to Arkansas and Louisiana; it is also known from the Columbia River estuary between Washington and Oregon.

Murdannia keisak can spread aggressively, crowding out other vegetation and forming a solid mat. It can disperse by its small seeds, which are a preferred food of ducks and other waterfowl; it can also reproduce vegetatively.
