= Murdannia triquetra =

Murdania triquetra

Scientific classification
- Kingdom: Plantae
- Clade: Tracheophytes
- Clade: Angiosperms
- Clade: Monocots
- Clade: Commelinids
- Order: Commelinales
- Family: Commelinaceae
- Genus: Murdannia
- Species: M. triquetra

Binomial name
- Murdannia triquetra (Wall.) Brückn.

Species of plant

Murdannia triquetra is a plant in the family Commelinaceae. It is known locally as ‘Roucao’(肉草) in Guangxi, and as ‘fine bamboo-leaf tall grass’(细竹叶高草) in Guangdong.

== Description ==
Murdannia triquetra is an annual herbaceous plant that grows between 50 and 80 cm tall. The stems are round, solid, and highly branched, with nodes that easily produce roots. Leaves are linear-lanceolate, alternately arranged, and resemble bamboo leaves, with sheathing bases that wrap around the stem. Flowers are light purple and have three petals. The fruits are small, oval capsules with tiny and grayish-black seeds.

== Distribution and habitat ==
Found in Vietnam, Cambodia, Taiwan, India, Laos, and mainland China—including Guangxi, Sichuan, Hubei, Jiangsu, Yunnan, Hunan, Fujian, Jiangxi, Henan, Zhejiang, Hainan, Guizhou, Shandong, Shaanxi, Guangdong, and other regions. It grows at elevations between 290 and 1,600 meters, typically found along the edges of rice paddies and in wetlands. It has not yet been artificially introduced or cultivated.
