= Ajacicyathina =

Ajacicyathina Temporal range: Early Cambrian

Scientific classification
- Kingdom: Animalia
- Phylum: Porifera
- Order: †Ajacicyathida
- Suborder: †Ajacicyathina; Bedford and Bedford 1939

Superfamilies
- † Annulocyathoidea Krasnopeeva 1953; † Bronchocyathoidea Bedford and Bedford 1936; † Erbocyathoidea Vologdin and Zhuravleva 1956; † Ethmophylloidea Okulitch 1937; † Lenocyathoidea Zhuravleva 1956; † Pretiosocyathoidea Rozanov 1969; † Sigmocyathoidea Krasnopeeva 1953; † Tercyathoidea Vologdin 1939; † Tumulocyathoidea Krasnopeeva 1953

Ajacicyathina is a prehistoric suborder of sponges in the order Ajacicyathida. It was described in 1939, and is known from the Early Cambrian.
