= Murdannia dimorphoides =

Scientific classification
- Kingdom: Plantae
- Clade: Tracheophytes
- Clade: Angiosperms
- Clade: Monocots
- Clade: Commelinids
- Order: Commelinales
- Family: Commelinaceae
- Genus: Murdannia
- Species: M. dimorphoides

Binomial name
- Murdannia dimorphoides Faden

Species of flowering plant

Murdannia dimorphoides is a plant species endemic to Sri Lanka, known from only one location inside Wilpattu National Park.

Murdannia dimorphoides is an annual, trailing herb sometimes rooting at the nodes. Leaves are narrow, up to 12 cm long. Some flowers are hermaphroditic, others staminate only, either way lilac to lavender, up to 15 mm across.
