= Madonia =

Madonia is a family name of Italian origin. It may refer to:

- Danilo Madonia, Italian musician and composer
- Ezio Madonia, Italian sprinter
- Francesco Madonia, Italian mobster
- José Gabriel Madonia, Venezuelan actor and model
- Kristen-Paige Madonia, American writer
- Luca Madonia, Italian singer-songwriter
