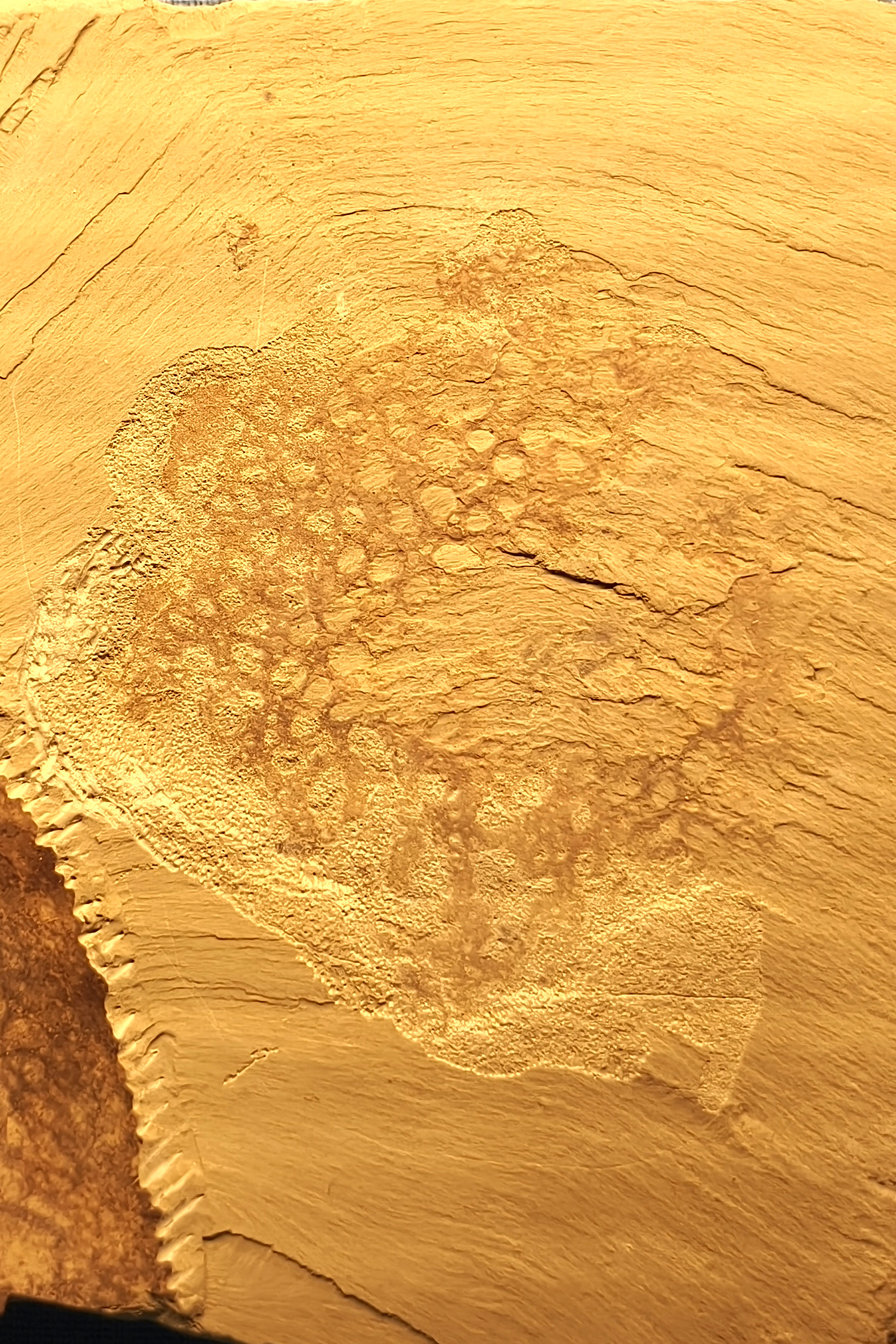
- Fossil of Crumillospongia frondosa

Scientific classification
- Kingdom: Animalia
- Phylum: Porifera
- Class: Demospongiae
- Order: †Protomonaxonida
- Family: †Hazeliidae
- Genus: †Crumillospongia; Rigby, 1986

Species
- C. frondosa (Walcott, 1919) Rigby, 1986; C. biporosa Rigby, 1986

= Crumillospongia =

Crumillospongia Temporal range: Upper Lower Cambrian–Middle Cambrian

Extinct genus of sponges

Crumillospongia is a genus of middle Cambrian sponges known from the Burgess Shale and other localities from the Lower and Middle Cambrian. Its name is derived from the Latin crumilla ("money purse") and spongia ("sponge"), a reflection of its similarity to a small leathery money purse. That is, it has a saclike shape, and its wall has holes of two sizes, with a well-developed internal canal system. 49 specimens of Crumillospongia are known from the Greater Phyllopod bed, where they comprise 0.1% of the community.
