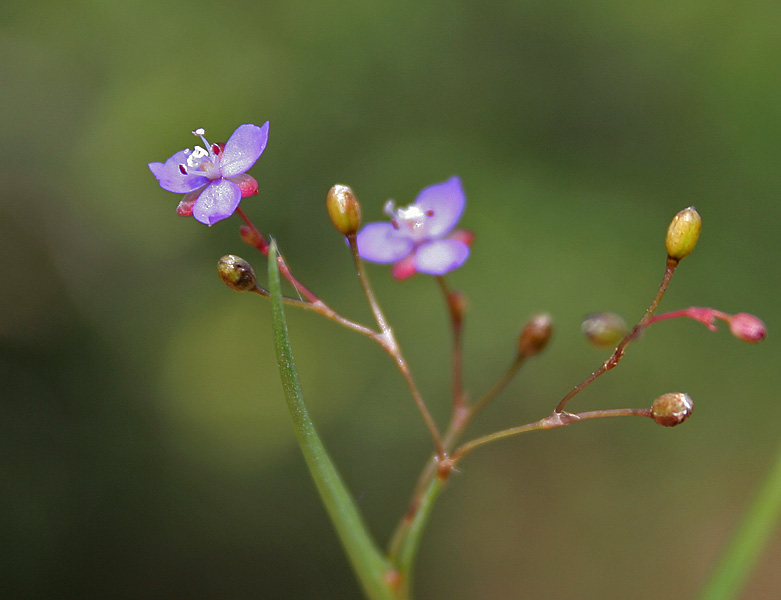
- Murdannia semiteres in Hyderabad, India

Scientific classification
- Kingdom: Plantae
- Clade: Tracheophytes
- Clade: Angiosperms
- Clade: Monocots
- Clade: Commelinids
- Order: Commelinales
- Family: Commelinaceae
- Subfamily: Commelinoideae
- Tribe: Commelineae
- Genus: Murdannia; Royle (1839)

Type species
- M. edulis (Stokes) Faden

Synonyms
- Anthericopsis Engl. (1895); Aphylax Salisb. (1812), nom. nud.; Baoulia A. Chev. (1912); Dichaespermum Wight (1853); Dilasia Raf. (1838); Ditelesia Raf. (1837); Gillettia Rendle (1896); Prionostachys Hassk. (1866); Streptylis Raf. (1838); Talipulia Raf. (1837)

= Murdannia =

Genus of flowering plants

Murdannia is a genus of annual or perennial monocotyledonous flowering plants in the family Commelinaceae.

The genus is one of the largest in the family. They are most easily distinguished from other genera in the family by their three-lobed or spear-shaped antherodes (i.e. non-functional anthers). Also it is the only genus with staminodes (i.e. non-functional stamens) opposite the petals.

Murdannia are found in tropical regions across the globe with extensions into warm temperate areas. Typically, Murdannia species are found in open areas in mesic soils. However, some are semi-aquatic, and a limited few are found in closed forest situations. Three species are naturalized in the United States (Murdannia keisak, M. nudiflora and M. spirata).

The genus is named in honor of Murdan Ali, a plant collector who worked for John Forbes Royle and maintained the herbarium at Saharanpur, India. He was a munshi who took a keen interest in natural history and under the training of Falconer, Royle and Edgeworth had become a proficient botanist who compiled a vernacular flora of northern India and the Himalayas which was however never published.

Species

- Murdannia acutifolia (Lauterb. & K.Schum.) Faden - New Guinea
- Murdannia allardii (De Wild.) Brenan - Congo-Brazzaville, Zaïre
- Murdannia assamica Nampy & Ancy - Assam
- Murdannia audreyae Faden - Sri Lanka
- Murdannia axillaris Brenan - Kenya, Zanzibar, Pemba
- Murdannia blumei (Hassk.) Brenan - Indian Subcontinent, Java, Myanmar, Malaya
- Murdannia bracteata (C.B.Clarke) J.K.Morton ex D.Y.Hong - southern China, Laos, Thailand, Vietnam
- Murdannia brownii Nandikar & Gurav - western India
- Murdannia burchellii (C.B.Clarke) M.Pell. – Bolivia, Venezuela, and north, northeast, and west-central Brazil
- Murdannia citrina D.Fang - Guangxi in China
- Murdannia clandestina (Ridl.) Faden - Peninsular Malaysia
- Murdannia clarkeana Brenan - Central African Republic, Chad, Kenya
- Murdannia crocea (Griff.) Faden - India, Andaman and Nicobar Islands, Myanmar
- Murdannia cryptantha Faden - New Guinea, Queensland, Northern Territory of Australia
- Murdannia dimorpha (Dalzell) G.Brückn. - southern India
- Murdannia dimorphoides Faden - Sri Lanka
- Murdannia divergens (C.B.Clarke) G.Brückn. - southern China, Himalayas, Myanmar, Vietnam
- Murdannia edulis (Stokes) Faden - southern China, Himalayas, Indochina, Java, Bali, Philippines, New Guinea
- Murdannia esculenta (Wall. ex C.B.Clarke) R.S.Rao & Kammathy - India, Sri Lanka
- Murdannia fadeniana Nampy & Joby - Kerala State in India
- Murdannia fasciata (Warb. ex K.Schum. & Lauterb.) G.Brückn. - New Guinea
- Murdannia gardneri (Seub.) G.Brückn. - Brazil
- Murdannia gigantea (Vahl) G.Brückn. - Madagascar, Indian Subcontinent, Southeast Asia, New Guinea, Queensland, Northern Territory, New South Wales
- Murdannia glauca (Thwaites ex C.B.Clarke) G.Brückn. - India, Sri Lanka
- Murdannia graminea (R.Br.) G.Brückn. - Vietnam, Queensland, Northern Territory, New South Wales, Western Australia
- Murdannia hookeri (C.B.Clarke) G.Brückn. - Assam, southern China
- Murdannia japonica (Thunb.) Faden - China, Japan, Indian Subcontinent, Indochina, Borneo
- Murdannia juncoides (Wight) R.S.Rao & Kammathy - Kerala + Tamil Nadu in India
- Murdannia kainantensis (Masam.) D.Y.Hong - southern China
- Murdannia keisak (Hassk.) Hand.-Mazz. - Japan, Korea, Ryukyu Islands, Russia (Amur + Primorye), Taiwan, Laos, Vietnam, Nepal; naturalized in parts of United States
- Murdannia lanceolata (Wight) Kammathy - India, Sri Lanka
- Murdannia lanuginosa (Wall. ex C.B.Clarke) G.Brückn. - southern India
- Murdannia loriformis (Hassk.) R.S.Rao & Kammathy - China, Taiwan, Tibet, Ryukyu Islands, Bonin Islands, Indian Subcontinent, Indochina, Java, Philippines, New Guinea
- Murdannia macrocarpa D.Y.Hong - Yunnan, Guangdong, Cambodia
- Murdannia medica (Lour.) D.Y.Hong - Yunnan, Guangdong, Cambodia, Thailand, Vietnam
- Murdannia nampyana Joby, Rogimon & Nisha – India (Kerala)
- Murdannia nudiflora (L.) Brenan - southern China, Indian Subcontinent, Southeast Asia, New Guinea, Western Australia, Micronesia; naturalized in Hawaii, southeastern United States, Mexico, Central America, West Indies, northern South America, Sierra Leone, Congo-Brazzaville, Cook Islands
- Murdannia paraguayensis (C.B.Clarke ex Chodat) G.Brückn. - Paraguay, Brazil
- Murdannia pauciflora (G.Brückn.) G.Brückn. - southern India
- Murdannia saddlepeakensis M.V.Ramana & Nandikar – Andaman Islands
- Murdannia sahyadrica Ancy & Nampy - Maharashtra
- Murdannia satheeshiana Joby, Nisha & Unni - southern India
- Murdannia schomburgkiana (Kunth) G.Brückn. - Guyana, Brazil
- Murdannia semifoliata (C.B.Clarke ex S.Moore) G.Brückn. - Brazil
- Murdannia semiteres (Dalzell) Santapau - Zaire, Burundi, Rwanda, Kenya, Tanzania, Uganda, Zambia, Iran, Yemen, India, Vietnam
- Murdannia sepalosa (C.B.Clarke) C.K.Lee, Fuse & M.N.Tamura – Ethiopia, Kenya, Malawi, Mozambique, Somalia, Tanzania, Zambia, and Zaïre
- Murdannia simplex (Vahl) Brenan - sub-Saharan Africa, Madagascar, Indian Subcontinent, southern China, Indochina, Queensland
- Murdannia spectabilis (Kurz) Faden - southern China, Indochina, Philippines
- Murdannia spirata (L.) G.Brückn. - southern China, Indian Subcontinent, Indochina, Java, Philippines; naturalized in Florida + Samoa
- Murdannia stenothyrsa (Diels) Hand.-Mazz. - Sichuan, Yunnan
- Murdannia striatipetala Faden - Sri Lanka
- Murdannia stricta Brenan - Zaire, Rwanda
- Murdannia tenuissima (A.Chev.) Brenan - tropical Africa
- Murdannia triquetra (Wall. ex C.B.Clarke) G.Brückn. - southern China, Indochina, Himalayas
- Murdannia ugemugei R.B.Kamble, Somkuwar & Nandikar - India
- Murdannia undulata D.Y.Hong - Yunnan
- Murdannia vaginata (L.) G.Brückn. - southern China, Indian Subcontinent, Indochina, Java, Philippines, Queensland, Northern Territory
- Murdannia versicolor (Dalzell) G.Brückn. - India, Vietnam, Philippines
- Murdannia yunnanensis D.Y.Hong - Yunnan
- Murdannia zeylanica (C.B.Clarke) G.Brückn. - India, Sri Lanka
