= Protoprisma =

Protoprisma Temporal range: Burgess Shale

Scientific classification
- Kingdom: Animalia
- Phylum: Porifera
- Class: Hexactinellida
- Order: †Reticulosa
- Genus: †Protoprisma
- Species: †P. annulata

Binomial name
- †Protoprisma annulata Rigby and Collins, 2004

Extinct genus of sponges

Protoprisma is a genus of sponge known from the Burgess Shale.
