= Hyaloderma =

Scientific classification
- Kingdom: Fungi
- Division: Ascomycota
- Class: Sordariomycetes
- Informal group: Sordariomycetes incertae sedis
- Genus: Hyaloderma; Speg. (1884)

Type species
- Hyaloderma imperspicuum Speg. (1884)

Genus of fungi

Hyaloderma is a genus of fungi in the class Sordariomycetes. The relationship of this taxon to other taxa within the class is unknown (incertae sedis).
