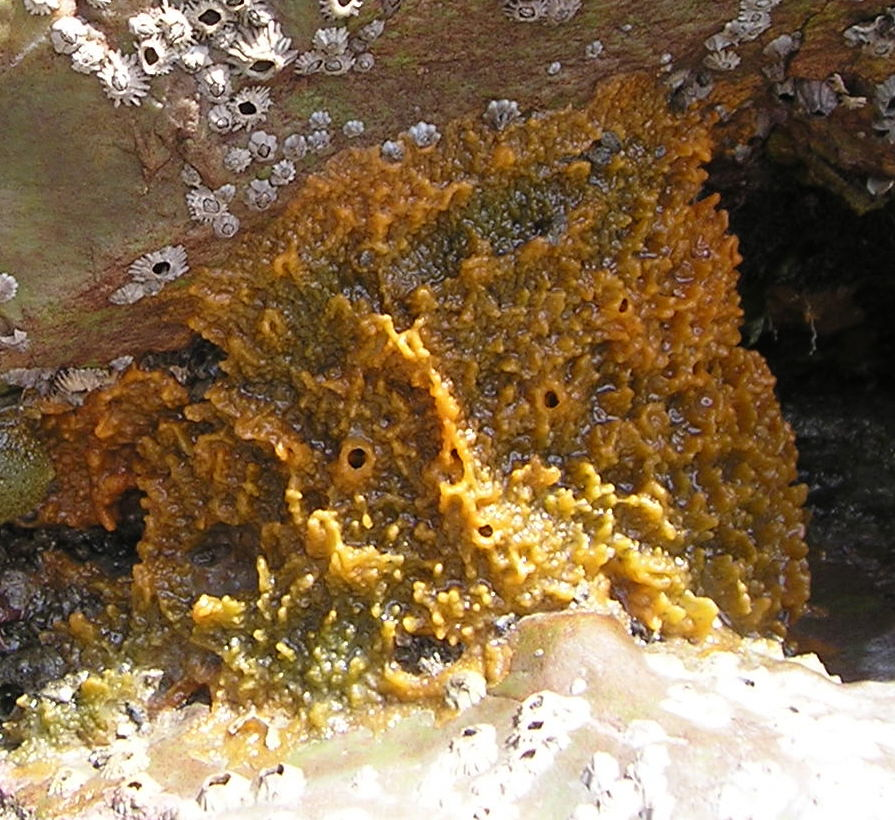
- Myxilla incrustans

Scientific classification
- Domain: Eukaryota
- Kingdom: Animalia
- Phylum: Porifera
- Class: Demospongiae
- Order: Poecilosclerida
- Family: Myxillidae
- Genus: Myxilla; Schmidt, 1862

Species
- See text

Synonyms
- Esperella (Myxilla) Schmidt, 1862

= Myxilla =

Genus of sponges

Myxilla is a genus of demosponge belonging to the family Myxillidae. These sponges usually form encrustations on rock surfaces.

== Species ==
The following species are recognized in the genus Myxilla:

- Subgenus Myxilla (Burtonanchora) Laubenfels, 1936
  - Myxilla (Burtonanchora) araucana Hajdu, Desqueyroux-Faúndez, Carvalho, Lôbo-Hajdu & Willenz, 2013
  - Myxilla (Burtonanchora) asigmata (Topsent, 1901)
  - Myxilla (Burtonanchora) asymmetrica Desqueyroux-Faúndez & van Soest, 1996
  - Myxilla (Burtonanchora) crucifera Wilson, 1925
  - Myxilla (Burtonanchora) gracilis (Lévi, 1965)
  - Myxilla (Burtonanchora) hastata Ridley & Dendy, 1886
  - Myxilla (Burtonanchora) lissostyla Burton, 1938
  - Myxilla (Burtonanchora) myxilloides (Lévi, 1960)
  - Myxilla (Burtonanchora) pedunculata Lundbeck, 1905
  - Myxilla (Burtonanchora) pistillaris Topsent, 1916
  - Myxilla (Burtonanchora) ponceti Goodwin, Brewin & Brickle, 2012
  - Myxilla (Burtonanchora) sigmatifera (Lévi, 1963)
- Subgenus Myxilla (Ectyomyxilla) Hentschel, 1914
  - Myxilla (Ectyomyxilla) arenaria Dendy, 1905
  - Myxilla (Ectyomyxilla) beauchenensis Goodwin, Jones, Neely & Brickle, 2016
  - Myxilla (Ectyomyxilla) chilensis Thiele, 1905
  - Myxilla (Ectyomyxilla) dracula Desqueyroux-Faúndez & van Soest, 1996
  - Myxilla (Ectyomyxilla) hentscheli Burton, 1929
  - Myxilla (Ectyomyxilla) janeae Van Soest & Hooper, 2020
  - Myxilla (Ectyomyxilla) kerguelensis (Hentschel, 1914)
  - Myxilla (Ectyomyxilla) mariana Ridley & Dendy, 1886
  - Myxilla (Ectyomyxilla) massa Ridley & Dendy, 1887
  - Myxilla (Ectyomyxilla) methanophila (Maldonado & Young, 1998)
  - Myxilla (Ectyomyxilla) parasitica Lambe, 1893
  - Myxilla (Ectyomyxilla) tornotata Brøndsted, 1924
- Subgenus Myxilla (Myxilla) Schmidt, 1862
  - Myxilla (Myxilla) acribria de Laubenfels, 1942
  - Myxilla (Myxilla) agennes de Laubenfels, 1930
  - Myxilla (Myxilla) austini Ott, Reiswig, McDaniel & Harbo, 2019
  - Myxilla (Myxilla) australis (Topsent, 1901)
  - Myxilla (Myxilla) barentsi Vosmaer, 1885
  - Myxilla (Myxilla) basimucronata Burton, 1932
  - Myxilla (Myxilla) behringensis Lambe, 1895
  - Myxilla (Myxilla) bivalvia Tanita, 1967
  - Myxilla (Myxilla) burtoni Van Soest & Hooper, 2020
  - Myxilla (Myxilla) caliciformis Sarà, 1978
  - Myxilla (Myxilla) columna Bergquist & Fromont, 1988
  - Myxilla (Myxilla) compressa Ridley & Dendy, 1886
  - Myxilla (Myxilla) crassa (Bowerbank, 1875)
  - Myxilla (Myxilla) dentata (Topsent, 1904)
  - Myxilla (Myxilla) distorta Burton, 1954
  - Myxilla (Myxilla) diversiancorata Lundbeck, 1905
  - Myxilla (Myxilla) elastica Koltun, 1958
  - Myxilla (Myxilla) elongata Topsent, 1917
  - Myxilla (Myxilla) fibrosa Levinsen, 1893
  - Myxilla (Myxilla) fimbriata (Bowerbank, 1866)
  - Myxilla (Myxilla) flexitornota Rezvoi, 1925
  - Myxilla (Myxilla) fusca (Whitelegge, 1906)
  - Myxilla (Myxilla) hastatispiculata Swartschevsky, 1905
  - Myxilla (Myxilla) hiradoensis Hoshino, 1981
  - Myxilla (Myxilla) incrustans (Johnston, 1842)
  - Myxilla (Myxilla) inequitornota Burton, 1931
  - Myxilla (Myxilla) insolens Koltun, 1964
  - Myxilla (Myxilla) iophonoides Swartschevsky, 1906
  - Myxilla (Myxilla) iotrochotina (Topsent, 1892)
  - Myxilla (Myxilla) lacunosa Lambe, 1893
  - Myxilla (Myxilla) lobata Hoshino, 1981
  - Myxilla (Myxilla) macrosigma Boury-Esnault, 1971
  - Myxilla (Myxilla) mexicensis Dickinson, 1945
  - Myxilla (Myxilla) mirabilis (Whitelegge, 1907)
  - Myxilla (Myxilla) mollis Ridley & Dendy, 1886
  - Myxilla (Myxilla) mucronata Pulitzer-Finali, 1986
  - Myxilla (Myxilla) nodaspera (Topsent, 1913)
  - Myxilla (Myxilla) novaezealandiae Dendy, 1924
  - Myxilla (Myxilla) perspinosa Lundbeck, 1905
  - Myxilla (Myxilla) producta Hoshino, 1981
  - Myxilla (Myxilla) prouhoi (Topsent, 1892)
  - Myxilla (Myxilla) pumicea (Whitelegge, 1906)
  - Myxilla (Myxilla) ramosa Kieschnick, 1896
  - Myxilla (Myxilla) reses (Topsent, 1892)
  - Myxilla (Myxilla) rosacea (Lieberkühn, 1859)
  - Myxilla (Myxilla) septentrionalis Fristedt, 1887
  - Myxilla (Myxilla) setoensis Tanita, 1961
  - Myxilla (Myxilla) seychellensis Thomas, 1981
  - Myxilla (Myxilla) simplex (Baer, 1906)
  - Myxilla (Myxilla) swartschewskii Burton, 1930
  - Myxilla (Myxilla) tarifensis Carballo & García-Goméz, 1996
  - Myxilla (Myxilla) victoriana Dendy, 1896
- Subgenus Myxilla (Styloptilon) Cabioch, 1968
  - Myxilla (Styloptilon) acanthotornota Goodwin, Jones, Neely & Brickle, 2011
  - Myxilla (Styloptilon) ancorata (Cabioch, 1968)
  - Myxilla (Styloptilon) canepai Schejter, Bertolino, Calcinai, Cerrano & Bremec, 2011
  - Myxilla (Styloptilon) fromontae Van Soest & Hooper, 2020
- Subgenus unassigned
  - Myxilla brunnea Hansen, 1885
  - †Myxilla dendyi Hinde & Holmes, 1892
  - Myxilla funalis (Bowerbank in Jeffreys & Norman, 1875)
