= Protoleucon =

Scientific classification
- Kingdom: Animalia
- Phylum: Porifera
- Class: Calcarea
- Order: Leucosolenida
- Family: Grantiidae
- Genus: Protoleucon
- Species: P. pavlovi

Binomial name
- Protoleucon pavlovi Bolkhovitinova, 1923

Extinct genus of calcareous sponge

Protoleucon is an extinct genus of calcareous sponges that belongs to the Leucosolenid family Grantiidae. The genus contains the species Protoleucon pavlovi. It lived in the Moscow region of Russia during the Carboniferous period.
