= Gabelia =

Gabelia (Georgian: გაბელია) is a Georgian surname. Notable people with the surname include:

- Gulnara Gabelia (born 1985), Georgian football striker
- Otar Gabelia (born 1953), Georgian football manager and a former player
