= Guadalupia =

Guadalupia Temporal range: Pennsylvanian–Norian

Scientific classification
- Domain: Eukaryota
- Kingdom: Animalia
- Phylum: Porifera
- Class: Demospongiae
- Order: Agelasida
- Family: †Guadalupiidae
- Genus: †Guadalupia; Girty, 1908

Extinct genus of sponges

Guadalupia is an extinct genus of sea sponges. It includes a number of extinct species including: Guadalupia auricula, G. cupulosa, G. ramescens, G. microcamera, and G. vasa.

Fossils of Guadalupia zitteliana Girty, 1908a and Guadalupia explanata (King, 1943) have been found in the Upper Permian limestone near the Carlsbad Caverns in New Mexico.
