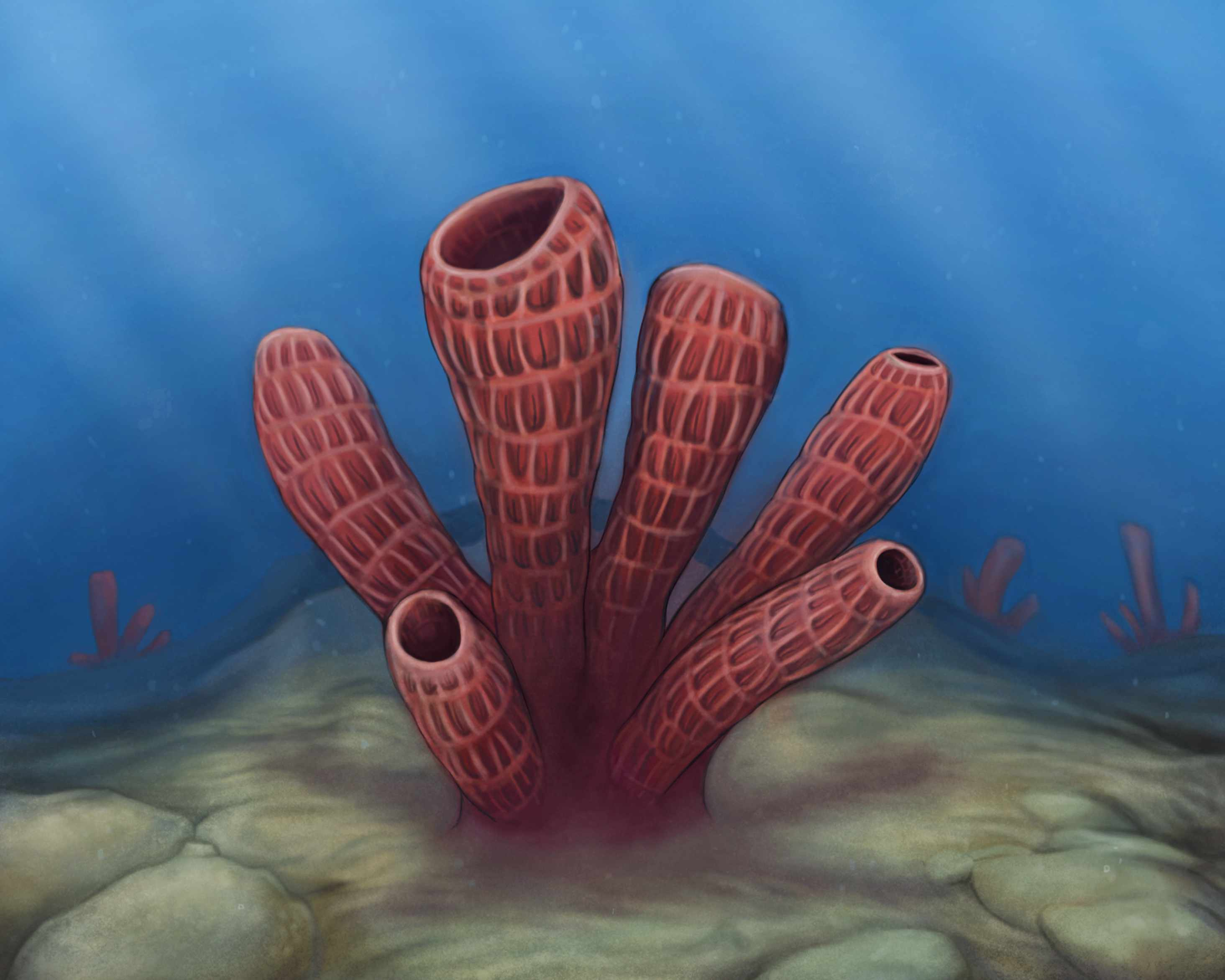
- Illustration of Falospongia ramosa

Scientific classification
- Kingdom: Animalia
- Phylum: Porifera
- Class: Demospongiae
- Order: †Protomonaxonida
- Family: †Hazeliidae
- Genus: †Falospongia; Rigby, 1986

Species
- F. falata Rigby, 1986 (type); F. ramosa Rigby & Collins 2004

= Falospongia =

Falospongia Temporal range: Burgess Shale

Extinct genus of sponges

Falospongia is a genus of sponge made up of radiating fronds, known from the Middle Cambrian Burgess Shale. Its name is derived from the Latin fala ("scaffold") and spongia ("sponge"), referring to the open framework of the skeleton. It superficially resembles Haplistion but is monaxial. 5 specimens of Falospongia are known from the Greater Phyllopod bed, where they comprise under 0.1% of the community.
