= Cystothalamia =

Scientific classification
- Kingdom: Animalia
- Phylum: Porifera
- Class: Demospongiae
- Order: Agelasida
- Family: †Guadalupiidae
- Genus: †Cystothalamia; Girty, 1908

Extinct genus of sponges

Cystothalamia is an extinct genus of sea sponges in the family Guadalupiidae that existed during the Permian and Triassic in what is now Austria, Hungary, Slovenia, Tajikistan, Croatia, Iran, Italy, Russia, Thailand, Tunisia, the United States (New Mexico and Texas), and Venezuela. It was described by G.H. Girty in 1909, and the type species is Cystothalamia nodulifera.

== Species ==
- Cystothalamia conica
- Cystothalamia crassa
- Cystothalamia megacysta
- Cystothalamia nana
- Cystothalamia nodulifera
- Cystothalamia ramosa
- Cystothalamia vandegraafi
- Cystothalamia surmaqensis
