= Fieldospongia =

Fieldospongia Temporal range: Burgess Shale

Scientific classification
- Kingdom: Animalia
- Phylum: Porifera
- Class: Demospongiae
- Family: †Anthaspidellidae
- Genus: †Fieldospongia

Extinct genus of sponges

Fieldospongia is a genus of sea sponge known from the Middle Cambrian Burgess Shale. Just five specimens of Fieldospongia are known from the Greater Phyllopod bed, where they comprise less than 0.1% of the community.

Described in 1920 as Tuponia bellilineata by Walcott in his monograph on sponges from the Burgess Shale, this form has now been placed within a separate genus, Fieldospongia, erected by Rigby in 1986. The only known specimen purportedly came from the Mount Whyte Formation
