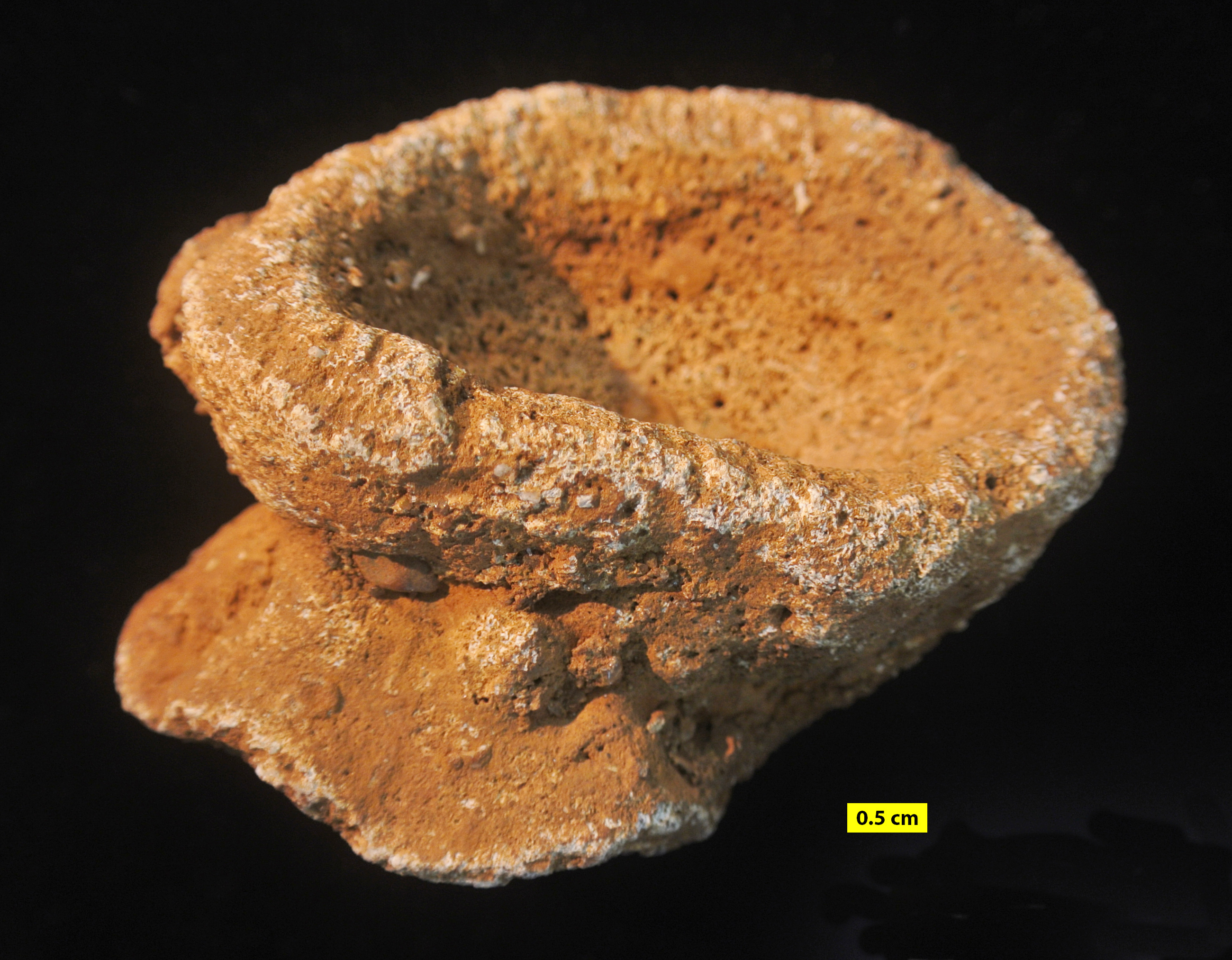
- Raphidonema faringdonense uncovered from the Faringdon Sand (Faringdon Sponge Gravels) of England.

Scientific classification
- Kingdom: Animalia
- Phylum: Porifera
- Class: Calcarea
- Order: †Stellispongiida
- Family: †Endostomatidae
- Genus: †Raphidonema; Hinde, 1883

= Raphidonema (sponge) =

Raphidonema Temporal range: Cretaceous–Eocene
- A unknown Raphidonema from England.

Extinct genus of calcareous sponges

Raphidonema is an extinct genus of calcareous sponges that belong to the family Endostomatidae.

== Fossil record ==
This genus is known in the fossil records from the Cretaceous period of France and United Kingdom around 136.5 million years ago to the Eocene of India around 37.2 million years ago.

This genus can be found in the Faringdon Sands (Faringdon Sponge Gravel Member) and Atherfield Clay Formation. Species found there include R. contortum, R. porcatum, R. farringdonensis, R. macropora and R. pustulatum. A species belonging to this genus (Raphidonema indica) has been reported in the Fulra Limestone Formation of Kutch, India dating to the middle Eocene epoch.

== Species ==
- Raphidonema contortum Hinde, 1884
- Raphidonema farringdonense Sharpe, 1854
- Raphidonema indica Rigby, J. K., & Mohanti, M., 1990
- Raphidonema macropora Sharpe, 1854
- Raphidonema porcatum Sharpe, 1854
- Raphidonema pustulatum Hinde, 1884
