= Léon Moret =

Léon Marie Louis Moret (4 July 1890 – 22 November 1972) was a French geologist and paleontologist. Initially trained in medicine he became a paleontologist and wrote several books on fossil plants and animals while also examining alpine geology. He supported the view that all rocks and soils were susceptible to flow over geological time.

Moret was born in Annecy, Haute-Savoie where his father was a notary. He took an early interest in natural history, and went to study medicine at Lyon as several members of the family were doctors. He studied medicine and was enlisted into World War I in 1914. He received a Croix de Guerre and after being demobilized he received his doctorate in 1919 with a thesis titled Contribution à l’étude des exostoses ostéogéniques. He then decided to study geology and became an assistant to Maurice Gignoux at Strasbourg. He moved to the University of Grenoble as a lecturer in geology in 1923. He succeeded Wilfrid Kilian in 1926 as chairman of the geology department and in 1953, he succeeded Gignoux at Strasbourg.

Moret's thesis in geology on fossil sponges in 1926. He then worked on a manual of animal paleontology, Manuel de paléontologie animale (1939), followed by Paléontologie végétale (1942) dealing with plant paleontology.

Moret was married to Elizabeth Denarié and they had four children. He was also a watercolour artist and painted several landscapes which were exhibited.
