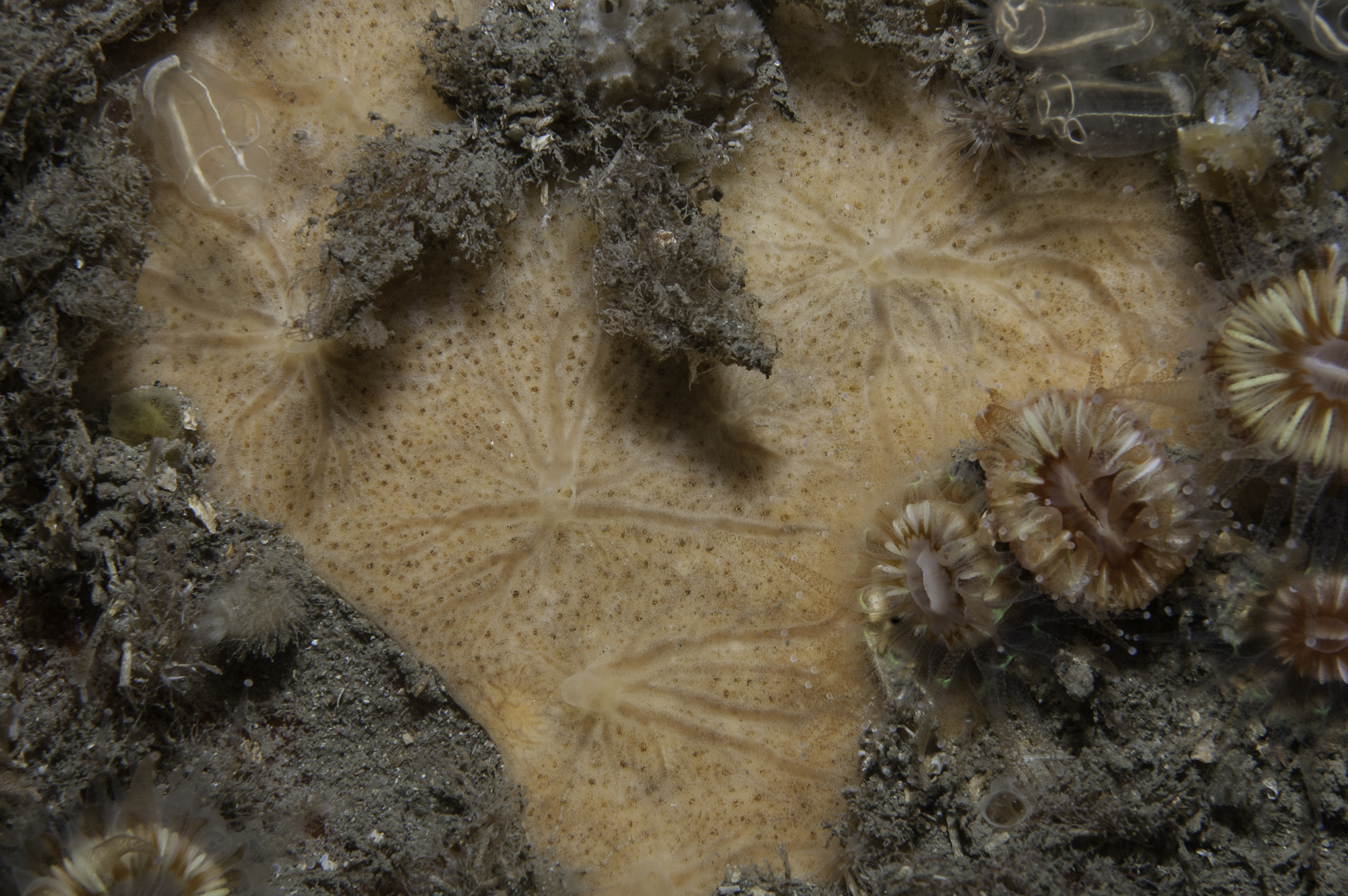
- Plocamiancora arndti

Scientific classification
- Kingdom: Animalia
- Phylum: Porifera
- Class: Demospongiae
- Order: Poecilosclerida
- Family: Myxillidae; Dendy, 1922

Genera
- See text

= Myxillidae =

Family of sponges

Myxillidae is a family of marine demosponges.

== Genera ==
- Damiriopsis Burton, 1928
- Ectyonopsis Carter, 1883
- Hymenancora Lundbeck, 1910
- Melonanchora Carter, 1874
- Myxilla Schmidt, 1862
- Plocamiancora Topsent, 1927
- Psammochela Dendy, 1916
- Stelodoryx Topsent, 1904
