= Ajacicyathida =

Ajacicyathida Temporal range: Early Cambrian

Scientific classification
- Kingdom: Animalia
- Phylum: Porifera
- Clade: †Archaeocyatha
- Order: †Ajacicyathida; Bedford and Bedford 1939

Suborders
- † Ajacicyathina Bedford and Bedford 1939; † Dokidocyathina Vologdin 1957; † Erismacoscinina Debrenne et al. 1989

Extinct order of sponges

Ajacicyathida is a prehistoric order of sponges in the class Archaeocyatha. It was described in 1939, and is known from the Early Cambrian.

== Taxonomy ==
In addition to the suborders Ajacicyathina, Dokidocyathina, and Erismacoscinina, the following genera are placed incertae sedis within Ajacicyathida:

- †Botocyathus
- †Kidjasocyathus Rozanov 1960
- †Procyathellus
- †Ptretiosocyathus Rozanov 1966
- †Stephanicyathus Voronova et al. 1987
