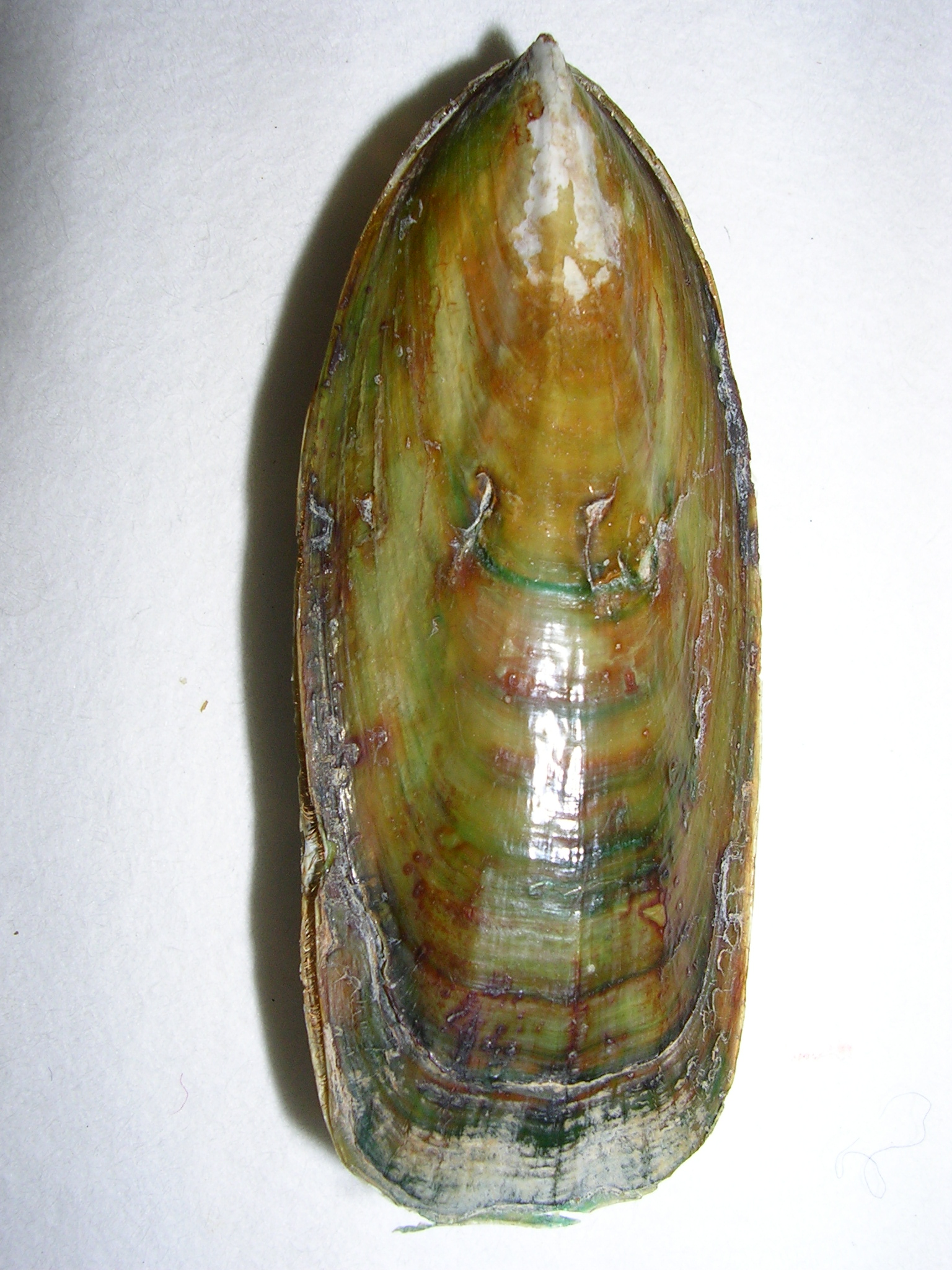
- Lingula anatina, shell (top), full habitus (bottom)
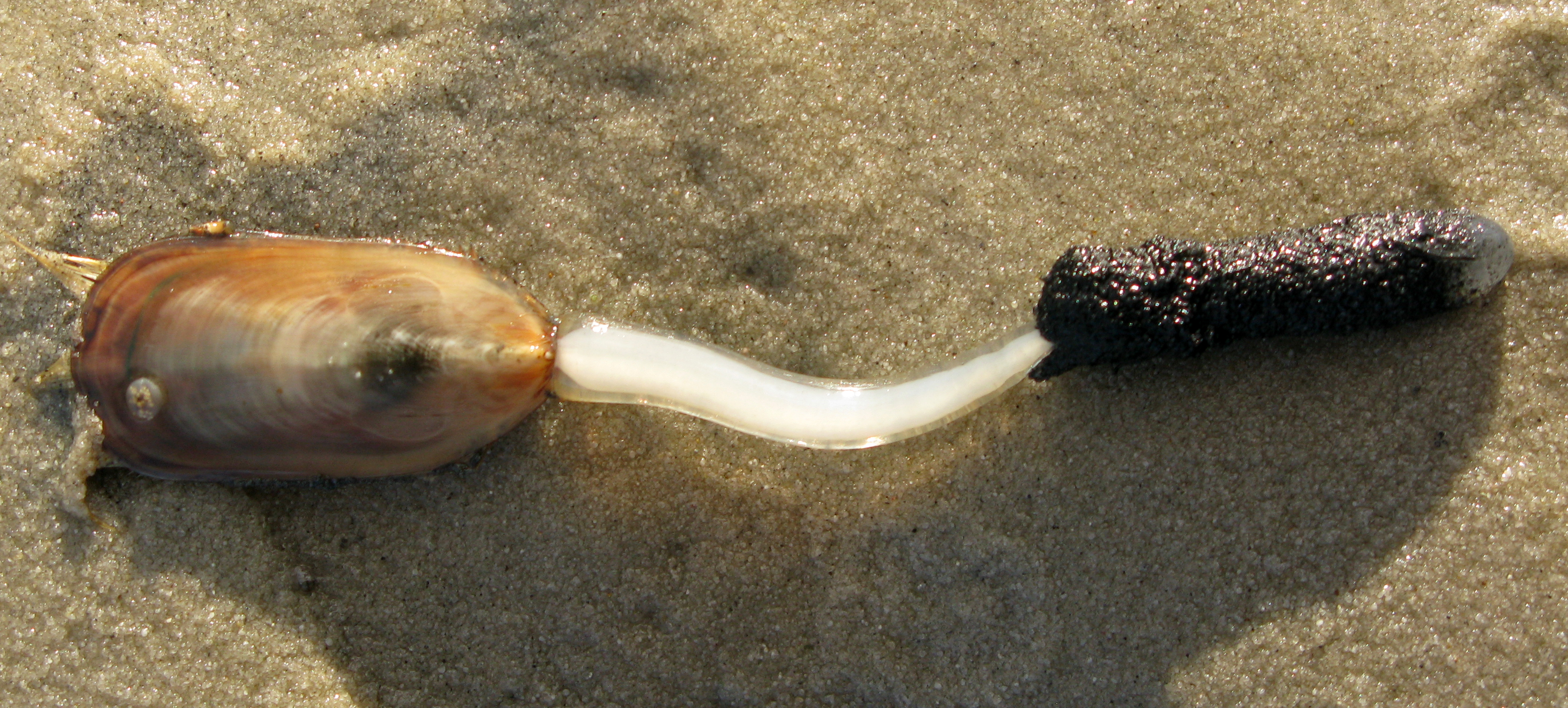

Scientific classification
- Kingdom: Animalia
- Phylum: Brachiopoda
- Class: Lingulata
- Order: Lingulida
- Family: Lingulidae
- Genus: Lingula; Bruguière, 1791

Type species
- Lingula anatina Lamarck, 1801

Species
- L. adamsi Dall, 1873; L. anatina Lamarck, 1801 = L. affinis, L. hirundo, L. lepidula, L. murphiana, L. nipponica, L. smaragdina, L. unguis, Tertiary to recent; L. dregeri Andreae, 1893; L. eocenica Moroz & Ermokhyna, 1990, Lower Eocene; L. parva Smith, 1871; L. reevii Davidson, 1880 = L. ovalis; L. rostrum (Shaw, 1798) = Mytilus rostrum, L. bancrofti, L. exusta, L. hians, L. jaspidea, Lower Pliocene to recent; L. tenuis Sowerby, 1812; L. translucida Dall, 1921; L. tumidula Reeve, 1841 = L. compressa; L. waikatoensis Pen, 1930

Synonyms
- Ligula, Ligularius, Lingularius, Pharetra

= Lingula (brachiopod) =

Lingula Temporal range: Cenozoic–Recent

Genus of brachiopods within the class Lingulata

Lingula is a genus of brachiopods within the class Lingulata. Lingula has been historically considered a 'living fossil' with members stretching back to the Cambrian, but those fossils likely represent other genera in the order Lingulida and the genus likely first originated in the early Cenozoic or late Cretaceous. Like its relatives, it has two unadorned organo-phosphatic valves and a long fleshy stalk. Lingula lives in burrows in barren sandy coastal seafloor and feeds by filtering detritus from the water. It can be detected by a short row of three openings through which it takes in water (sides) and expels it again (middle).

== Anatomy and morphology ==
=== Shell ===
A shell encloses the organs and other internal parts of the body, except for a long, fleshy stalk (or pedicle) that extends from the tail (or posterior) end of the shell. This shell has two nearly identical tan or bronze valves, that are often tinged greenish or bluegreenish. These are held together by muscles between them. The valves are secreted by two mantle folds, one on the dorsal and one on the ventral side of the body. The valves are composed of chitin, protein, and calcium phosphate and consist of about 50% organic material. The outer surface is covered by a thin glossy layer of protein called periostracum. The high organic content of the shell makes it somewhat soft and flexible. These valves are located on the dorsal and ventral surfaces of the animal. The front (or anterior) end of the shell has a squared off (or truncate) shape and the rear end tapers to a point where the stalk emerges. This point (called apex) is the earliest part of the valve. The shell of the young animal roughly remains the same, adding much material at the front and less at the sides. Many growth lines are visible, parallel to the margins of the shell. The valves widen slightly at the front end, forming a narrow opening (or gape), through which water is pumped in at the sides and out from the middle. The ventral valve is slightly longer and slightly more convex. The margin of the valves is fringed by chitinous tan colored bristle (or chaetae), short at the side of the valves, but much longer at the front where they assist in keeping open the access of the body cavity to the outside water. In death, the gape is closed and the bristles may be absent or short as they become brittle and darker in color when dry.

=== Stalk ===
The stalk (or pedicle) is a long white extension of the body, that emerges at the apex from between the valves, and not, as in articulate brachiopods, from a special opening in the dorsal valve. At the rear end, that is deepest in the sea bed, the skin (or epithelium) secretes a glue-like mucus that binds to the substrate's particles, thus temporarily anchoring the animal. The very thick skin (cuticle) is not composed of cells, and is opaque, being secreted by a very thin white epidermis, which is attached by a very thin layer of connective tissue to the white muscle inside. The muscle fibres are attached to the connective tissue and are wound like helixes. In the centre of the muscle runs an inconspicuous tube-shaped opening along the entire length, which is an extension of, and in open connection with, the body cavity within the shell. It is lined by a layer of one cell thick mesothelium.

=== Internal organs ===
Ovaries have a fine texture and a tan to orange color. Male gonads are coarse-grained and creamy white.

=== Reproduction ===
Species such as Lingula anatina have a breeding season that extends from summer to fall and breed annually. Their larvae are planktonic.

== Living fossil ==
Lingula has long been considered an example of a living fossil; in fact, the perceived longevity of this genus led Darwin to coin this concept. This living fossil status is now considered unjustified. This status is based on the shape of the shell only, and it has been shown that this shape corresponds to a burrowing lifestyle, occurring in different brachiopod lineages, with different and evolving internal structures.

== Taxonomy ==
The genus Lingula was created in 1791 by Jean Guillaume Bruguière. George Shaw describe Mytilus rostrum in 1798, but this species was later assigned to Lingula. In 1801 Jean-Baptiste Lamarck described L. anatina, its type species.

=== Possible etymologies ===
Lingula is probably derived from the Latin word for tongue "lingua" and a diminutive suffix -ula, so small tongue. Alternatively it may be derived from the Latin word for spoon (Lingula) directly. The origin of the epithet anatina is not known, but in Latin "anatina" means "belonging to the duck", possibly due to its resemblance to a duck bill. Another possible derivation could be from the French anatife ('goose barnacle'), for its likeness.

=== Reassigned species ===
The following species, previously assigned to Lingula are now considered better placed in other genera:

- L. albida = Glottidia albida
- L. alveolata = †Dignomia alveolata
- L. attenuata = †Palaeoglossa attenuata
- L. audebarti = Glottidia audebarti
- L. criei = †Tomasina criei
- L. davisii = †Lingulella davisii
- L. imbituvensis = †Langella imbituvensis
- L. lesueuri = †Ectenoglossa lesueuri
- L. nebrascensis = †Trigonoglossa nebrascensis
- L. pinnaformis = †Lingulepis pinnaformis
- L. plumbea = †Monobilina plumbea
- L. polita = †Dicellomus polita
- L. semen = Glottidia semen
- L. subspatulata = †Barroisella campbelli
- L. williamsana = †Lingulipora williamsana

=== Extinct species ===
The following are extinct Lingula species.

- ? †Lingula tenuis Sowerby
- †Lingula dregeri Andreae, 1893
- †Lingula waikatoensis Pen, 1930
- ? †Lingula eocenica Moroz & Ermokhyna, 1990

Extinct Glottidia or Lingula species:

- Glottidia dumortieri (Nyst, 1843)
- Glottidia antarctica (Buckman, 1910)
- Glottidia inexpectans Olsson, 1914
- Glottidia bravardi Figueiras & Martinez, 1995

== Ecology ==
Lingula inhabits a vertical burrow in soft sediments, with the front face upward near the surface of the sea bed. The cilia on the lophophore create a current through the mantle cavity, which ensures the supply of food particles and oxygen. Although Lingula is one of the most euryhaline brachiopods, it tolerates only moderate salinity variations (down to about half seawater salt concentration) and is optimally marine.

== Cuisine ==
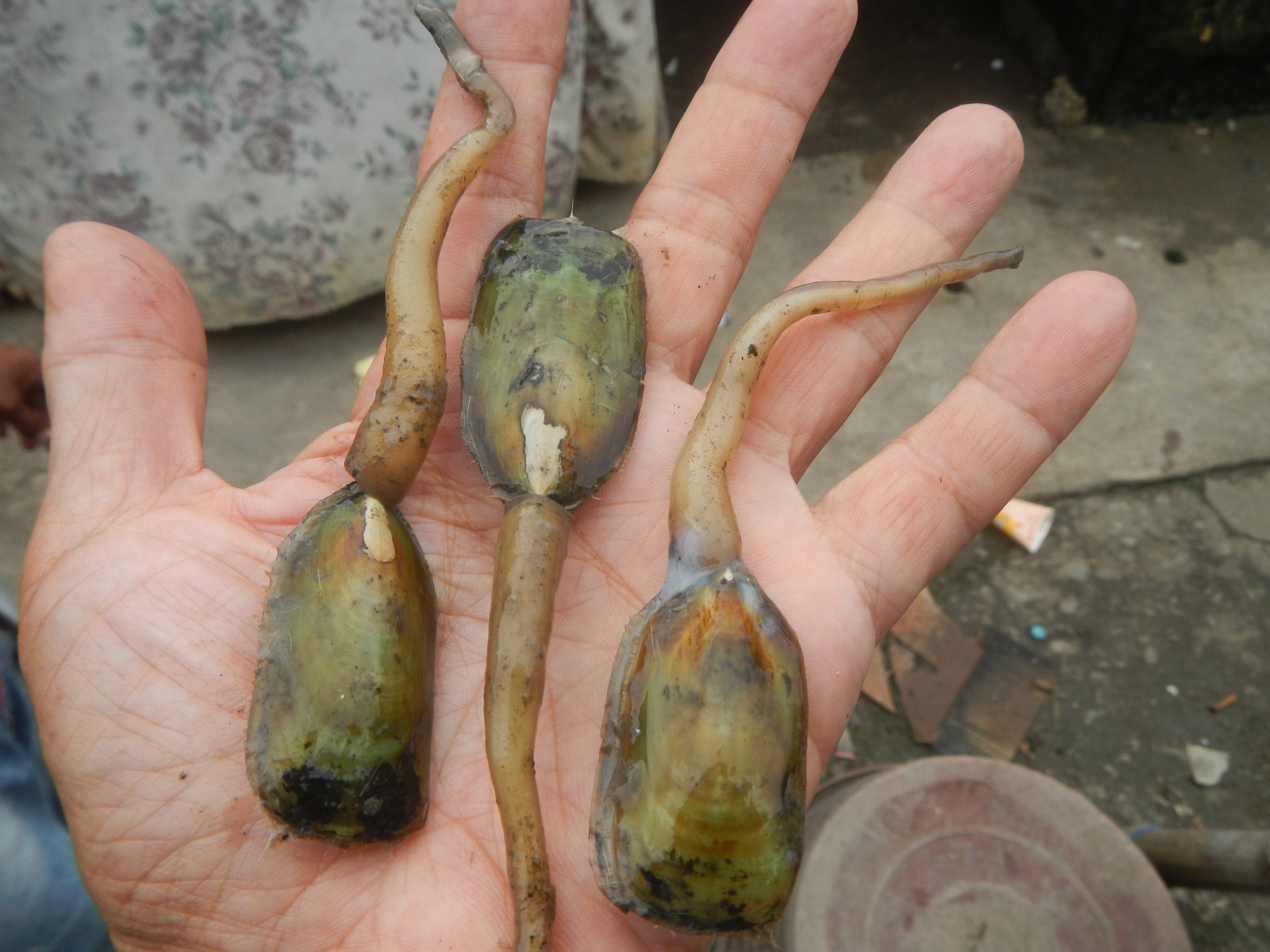
Lingula anatina sold as shellfish in a marketplace in Hagonoy, Philippines.

It is eaten in various parts of the world, such as Vietnam. Because they live in mud, they first need to be cleansed in fresh water. The most popular part is the stalk, which is crunchy to eat. They are also fermented.

== Gallery ==
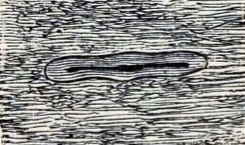
The sole evidence of the presence of Lingula anatina is a small three-lobed slit on the surface of the substrate

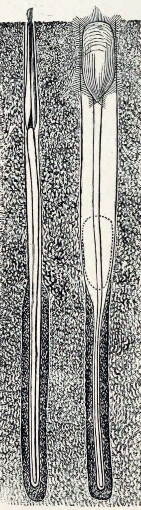
Lingula anatina in tubes in the sand, lateral and dorsal or ventral views; the dotted line indicates position in retraction

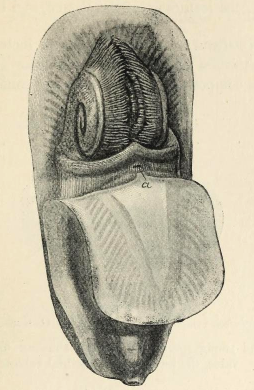
Lingula anatina: animal removed from the shell, mantle reflected, coiled arms separated slightly; a) mouth (marginal setae omitted); ventral aspect, three-quarter face

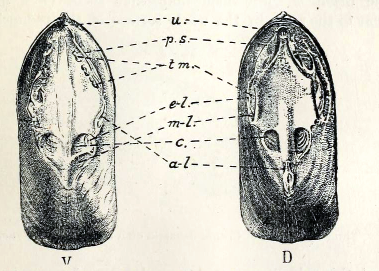
Lingula anatina: interior of the valve showing muscle scars; V. peduncle valve D. brachial valve
