= Aboriginella =

Aboriginella Temporal range: 498.5–488.3 Ma Furongian

Scientific classification
- Kingdom: Animalia
- Phylum: Brachiopoda
- Class: Lingulata
- Order: Lingulida
- Family: †Lingulellotretidae
- Genus: †Aboriginella; Koneva, 1983
- Species: †A. denudata

Binomial name
- †Aboriginella denudata Koneva, 1983

Extinct genus of brachiopods

Aboriginella is an extinct genus of brachiopods found in Aksayan to Batyrbaian strata in Kazakhstan. It was a facultatively mobile infaunal suspension feeder.
