= Lingula reevii =

Scientific classification
- Domain: Eukaryota
- Kingdom: Animalia
- Phylum: Brachiopoda
- Class: Lingulata
- Order: Lingulida
- Family: Lingulidae
- Genus: Lingula
- Species: L. reevii

Binomial name
- Lingula reevii Davidson, 1880

Species of marine lamp shell

Lingula reevii is an inarticulated brachiopod species assigned to the family Lingulidae. L. reevii is rare and is known to occur in shallow, sandy reef flats in Kaneohe Bay, Oahu, Hawaii, as well as in Japan, and Ambon, Indonesia.

== Description ==
The shell is oblong oval, broadest in the middle, and rather narrow. The sides are very gently curved outwardly; the posterior edge tapers to a sharp point. The shell valves are moderately convex with a smooth surface. Color is blue-green or emerald and verdigris-green, especially along the middle. The lophophore consists of a fold of the body wall that possesses a crown of ciliated tentacles surrounding the mouth. The lateral cilia create a water current and fine plankton are transported down the tentacles to the brachial groove and into the mouth. It is ammonotelic.

== Ecology ==
L. reevii is a filter-feeding invertebrate that burrows vertically in sandy sediment, leaving a three-hole siphonal opening at the surface. When disturbed, a rapid contraction of the pedicle pulls the animal below the surface and the siphonal openings are reduced to a slit. This species is capable of upward burrowing through a sediment layer, even if the animal has to autotomize (detach) the pedicle.

== Reproduction ==
Lingula has separate sexes, and gametes are shed into the water column for external fertilization. Embryos develop into a free swimming larva that looks like a tiny adult; they develop a shell while planktonic. As additional shell material is laid down, the animal becomes heavy, sinks to the bottom, and takes up its adult existence. There is no metamorphosis in Lingula. The lifespan of Lingula spp. is estimated to be 5 to 8 years.

== Threats and conservation ==
The species has declined in density from 500 per square meter in the 1960s to a maximum of 4 per square meter. The main threats are: 1) habitat degradation and alteration; 2) overexploitation; 3) marine pollution and sedimentation; 4) a vulnerable life history; and 5) a limited distribution.

Lingula reevii is a U.S. National Marine Fisheries Service Species of Concern. Species of Concern are those species about which the U.S. Government’s National Oceanic and Atmospheric Administration, National Marine Fisheries Service, has some concerns regarding status and threats, but for which insufficient information is available to indicate a need to list the species under the U.S. Endangered Species Act.
