= Castle Bank =

Fossil deposit in Wales

- Stratigraphic range: Middle Ordovician; ~462 Ma
- The locality and stratigraphy of Castle Bank within the Builth–Llandrindod Inlier of Powys, Wales
- Type: Konservat-Lagerstätte
- Unit of: Gilwern Volcanic Formation
- Thickness: 10 m (33 ft)

Lithology
- Primary: Siltstone
- Other: Pyroclastic rock, Tuff

Location
- Coordinates: 52.25°N 3.38°W
- Region: Powys
- Country: Wales

Type section
- Named for: Castle Bank Quarry
- Named by: Botting et al.
- Year defined: 2023

Castle Bank is a Middle Ordovician aged fossiliferous deposit, which is found outcropping within the Gilwern Volcanic Formation of the wider Builth Volcanic Group, near to Llandrindod Wells in Mid Wales. Considered to be a Konservat-Lagerstätte, it contains an abundance of Burgess Shale-type fauna, such as the opabiniid-like panarthropod Mieridduryn bonniae. In other areas of the locality, there is also a notably large collection of sponges from ascospongids, hexactinellids to reticulosans.

== History of research ==
Prior to the formal description of the main locality, the Castle Bank site had been discovered by palaeontologists Joe Botting and Lucy Muir sometime during 2013, although at the time they deemed the site uninteresting, and thus left it. In 2015, they would publish a paper on fossil sponge communities in the Ordovician rocks of the Builth Inlier they had been collecting and studying for 15 years, in which they note that they had found an interesting sponge bed within the Castle Bank site, which contained a notably high number of protomonaxonid sponges, which prompted them to undertake further collections from this new sponge locality at Castle Bank, yielding even more material such as hexactinellid and reticulosan sponges, and which saw the proposed replacement of Protomonaxonida with the new class Ascospongiae.

It wouldn't be until 2020 when they returned to the main locality itself, primarily due to the fact that they could no longer travel to Cardiff were they worked at the Amgueddfa Cymru – Museum Wales as honorary research fellows with the onset of the COVID-19 lockdowns, and the fact it was relatively close to where they lived in the town of Llandrindod Wells. Upon closer inspection, they realised that a small area of the site contained an abundance of fossil material, although this material was far too small for them to properly study. The owners of the farm which the site was found within suggested to Dr. Botting and Muir that they should crowdfund some instruments to permit them to study said material, which they did successfully. With this, during the period between 2020 and 2023, Dr. Botting and Muir, as well as researchers coming in from the Nanjing Institute of Geology and Palaeontology of the Chinese Academy of Sciences (NIGPAS) and Sweden to help, would recover over 170 species, most of which are new to science. The site itself would be formally described and named in 2023, taking its name from Castle Bank Quarry, which it is found outcropping in.

Whilst the collection of new fossil material continues, various new fossil genera have been slowly described from the locality, such as the opabiniid-like panarthropod Mieridduryn bonniae in 2022 prior to the naming of the locality, alongside the bivalved arthropods Ffabach and Gloynia in 2026.

== Geology ==
The Castle Bank site can be found outcropping in the upper layers of the graptolitic siltstone Gilwern Volcanic Formation, near to Llandrindod Wells in Mid Wales, which itself is a part of the wider Builth Volcanic Group. The site itself is predominately composed of inter-bedded siltstones, with substantial deposits of pyroclastic volcanic rock alongside ash laminae, all of which is capped by a 2 m (6.6 ft) layer of tuffaceous rocks, with the overall known thickness of the locality coming in at 10 m (33 ft). The fossil-bearing layers of the site are restricted to a 2 m (6.6 ft) thick interval of siltstone and ash laminae, with the most abundant fossils being found within a thin 20 cm (8 in) coarse-grained silt sequence in the middle of this interval.

The environment of the Castle Bank site at the time of its deposition was likely an open-marine environment along a volcanic island complex, on what was then the microcontinent of Avalonia, which was at the time occupying the temperate southern latitudes of the Middle Ordovician.

== Dating ==
The Castle Bank site has been dated using the notably abundant graptolite fossils, namely of Didymograptus murchisoni and D. foliaceus. This would see the locality placed in the Middle Ordovician Didymograptus murchisoni Biozone, which would thus lithostratigraphically place the deposition of the rocks at the top of this biozone, to around 462 Ma.

== Taphonomy ==
The soft tissue of fossils within Castle Bank are preserved as carbonaceous compressions in the rock, which are usually brown in colouration, and have a fine level of detail, preserving delicate labile tissues and details as small as 10 μm (0.00039 in). The rocks of the locality have been heavily metamorphosed, and exposed layers deeply weathered, resulting in the colouration of the fossils not being as striking as fossils seen in the Chenjiang and Fezouata biotas. The spicules of fossil sponges here are commonly preserved as moulds either within a dark brown to pale brown weathering carbonaceous material, or brown probable iron-oxide replacements of pyrite. Some spicules have also been found with this pyrite still within them if they are in indurated sediments. Spicules can commonly be obscured by preserved soft tissue, rarely showing any sharp details as a result.

== Paleobiota ==
A selection of bivalved arthropods from the Castle Bank Lagerstätte

The Castle Bank site contains a wealth of Burgess Shale-type fauna, rivalling even the best Cambrian deposits in the shear abundance and preservation of fossils, as well as showing major changes that occurred ecologically. The fossils themselves are preserved as carbonaceous remains, with a majority of them being notably small in size, ranging from just 1–5 mm (0–0 in) in most cases, excluding fragments of trilobites and centimetre large sponges. The small size of the fossils may be a result of the miniaturisation of organisms in order to be able to make use of equally small benthic organisms as shelter from larger animals, and thus showing that the transition to small and meiofaunal life habits likely began sometime during the Middle Ordovician and the Great Ordovician Biodiversification Event, filling in a notable gap between the Cambrian fauna and the later Ordovician faunas. A majority of the fossils are also of soft-bodied organisms, such as annelid worms, with the only other Ordovician age site preserving soft-bodied organisms in a high level of detail being from the Fezouata Biota in Morocco. The site has thus been noted to be highly important by Dr. Botting and Muir, as well as many other researchers in the field, potentially to a similar level of importance as the Burgess Shale in Canada.

The biota itself is predominately composed of arthropods, such as the opabiniid-like Mieridduryn bonniae, alongside a myriad of bivalved arthropods such as Caryocaris, Bullaeferum, and Ffabach. The locality also contains a large collection of sponges, something noted to be a common feature in Burgess-shale Type Faunas, such as Choiaella, Nectocollare, Teganiella, and a myriad of undescribed sponges, which are the main dominate fossils of this locality alongside graptolites, suggesting a survival of sponges in Castle Bank that were unable to compete with the increasingly advanced sponges of the Ordovician.

Color key: Taxon / Reclassified taxon / Taxon falsely reported as present / Dubious taxon or junior synonym / Ichnotaxon / Ootaxon / Morphotaxon

Notes
Uncertain or tentative taxa are in small text
~~crossed out~~ taxa are discredited.

=== Arthropoda ===
Arthropoda
Genus	Species	Notes	Images
Mieridduryn	M. bonniae	Opabiniid-like arthropod, likely expending the temporal range of the opabiniids into the Ordovician.	
Ogyginus	O. corndensis	Asaphid trilobite. Only known from the sponge locality.	
Caryocaris	Caryocaris sp.	Caryocaridid arthropod. Lack of diagnostic features precludes species level assignment, though it is noted to likely be C. wrightii. The singular specimen was also found long before any other material was found from here, and also has an arrow scratched into the carapace.	
Ivocaris (?)	Ivocaris (?) sp.	Caryocaridid arthropod. Poor preservation precludes species level assignment, and makes the genus level assignment tentative. If the genus level assignment can be further confirmed with better material, this would extend the geographical range of Ivocaris.	
Bullaeferum	B. llandeiloensis	Bolliid podocope.	
Laterophores	Laterophores sp.	Bolliid podocope.	
Pariconchoprimitia	Pariconchoprimitia sp.	Aechminid podocope.	
Gloynia	G. jonesi	Bivalved arthropod of uncertain affinities.	
Ffabach	F. peryglus	Bivalved arthropod of uncertain affinities.	

=== Hemichordata ===
Hemichordata
Genus	Species	Notes	Images
Didymograptus	D. murchisoni; D. foliaceus	Didymograptid graptolite, the fossils of which have seen the locality dated to the Middle Ordovician within the Didymograptus murchisoni Biozone.	
Dictyonema	Dictyonema sp.	Callograptid graptolite, with one specimen containing a preserved zooid.	

=== Annelida ===
Annelida
Genus	Species	Notes	Images
Llwygarua	L. suzannae	Thalassematid annelid.	

=== Lophotrochozoa ===
Lophotrochozoa
Genus	Species	Notes	Images
Apatobolus	A. micula	Obolid brachiopod.	
Monobolina	M. ramsayi	Brachiopod.	
Schizocrania	S. multistriata	Trematid brachiopod.	

=== Cnidaria ===
Cnidaria
Genus	Species	Notes	Images
Sphenothallus	Sphenothallus sp.	Conulariid cnidarian.	
Paraconularia	Paraconularia sp.	Conulariid cnidarian.	

=== Porifera (Sponges) ===
Porifera
Genus	Species	Notes	Images
Capsospongia (?)	Capsospongia (?) sp.	Anthaspidellid sponge.	
Choiaella	C. hexactinophora	Ascospongid sponge. Species showed that choiid sponges contained hexactins, something previously only known to the hexactinellids, thus seeing a proposal to replace the order Protomonaxonida with the new class Ascospongiae.	
Coniculospongia	Coniculospongia sp.	Sponge.	
Cyathophycus	Cyathophycus sp.	Reticulosan sponge.	
Halichondrites	Halichondrites sp.	Halichondritid sponge.	Specimen of Halicondrites at the Naturhistorisches Museum
Hamptonia	Hamptonia sp.	Hamptoniid sponge.	Hazelia from the Maotianshan Shales
Hazelia	Hazelia aff. H. luteria	Hazeliid ponge.	Hazelia from the Burgess Shale
Sentinelia (?)	Sentinelia (?) sp.	Sponge.	
Teganiella	Teganiella sp.	Hexactinellid sponge, first record outside of the Americas.	
Teganium	T. avalonensis; Teganium sp.	Hexactinellid sponge.	
Nectocollare	N. zakdoueli	Amphidiscophoran sponge, with probable affinities to the hexactinellids.	
Vauxia (?)	Vauxia (?) cf. V. venata	Vauxiid sponge.	Vauxia from the Burgess Shale
cf. Valospongia	cf. Valospongia sp.	Sponge.	
Xylochos	Xylochos sp.	Sponge.	

=== Microorganisms ===
Microorganisms
Genus	Species	Notes	Images
Filisphaeridium	Filisphaeridium sp.	Acritarch.	
Leiosphaeridia	Leiosphaeridia sp.	Acritarch.	

=== Undescribed ===
Undescribed
Genus	Species	Notes	Images
Conulariid-like fossil (NMW.2021.3 G.93)	???	A fossil with a similar appearance to the Conulariida.	
Unidentified acrotretid brachiopod (NMW.2021.3 G.90)	???	An unidentified acrotretid brachiopod.	
Undescribed fenestellid bryozoan (NMW.2021.3 G.62)	???	An undescribed fenestellid bryozoan, found attached to a poorly preserved orthocone nautiloid.	
Probable sipunculan-like worm (NMW.2021.3 G.84)	???	An worm-like fossil, which bears similarities to the sipunculans.	
Probable priapulid-like worm (NIGP175887)	???	An worm-like fossil, which bears similarities to the priapulids.	
Unidentified spinose worm (NMW.2021.3 G.94)	???	A spinose worm of uncertain affinities with a complex jaw apparatus.	
Probable priapulid worm (NMW.2021.3 G.97)	???	A probable priapulid worm.	
Archaeopriapulid worm (NMW.2021.3 G.19)	???	An Archaeopriapulid worm with a complex proboscis.	
Kinorhynch-like worm fossils	???	An myriad of worm fossils, bearing similarities to the Kinorhynch.	
Palaeoscolecid worm with transverse plates (NMW.2021.3 G.88)	???	A Palaeoscolecid worm, with transverse rows of large plates.	
Palaeoscolecid worm with minute plates (NMW.2021.3 G.89)	???	A Palaeoscolecid worm, with notably minute plates.	
Hexpod-like arthropod (NMW.2021.3 G.11)	???	An arthropod fossil, which bears features similar to the Hexapoda.	
Yohoiid-like arthropod (NMW.2021.3 G.83)	???	An arthropod fossil, which bears similarities to the yohoiids.	
Unidentified arthropod (NMW.2021.3 G.34i)	???	Unidentified arthropod, which has a bilobed tail fan, alongside a head-region preserving preserving eyes and presumed neural tissue.	
Stem-group xiphosuran (NMW.2021.3 G.9)	???	Stem-group xiphosuran.	
Cephalocarid-like arthropod (NMW.2021.3 G.14)	???	An arthropod fossil, which bears features similar to the cephalocarids.	
Undetermined podocope ostracode A (NMW.2021.3G.162)	???	Undetermined podocope.	
New bivalved euarthropod (NMW.2021.3G.162)	???	A new bivalved euarthropod, poor preservation precludes formal description and naming.	
Undetermined bivalved arthropod A - I	???	Multiple undetermined bivalved arthropods.	
Undetermined bivalved carapaces without spines	???	Multiple undetermined bivalved arthropods without spines.	
Barnacle-like fossil (NMW.2021.3 G.66)	???	An arthropod fossil, which bears features similar to barnacles.	
Small complex Hexactinellid sponge (NMW.2021.3 G.35)	???	A small, complex Hexactinellid sponge of uncertain affinities.	
Complex Hexactinellid sponge (NMW.2021.3 G.40)	???	A complex Hexactinellid sponge of uncertain affinities.	
Cylindrical Hexactinellid sponge (NIGP175889)	???	A tall, cylindrical Hexactinellid sponge of uncertain affinities.	
Complex conico-cylindrical Hexactinellid sponge (NIGP175889)	???	A complex, conico-cylindrical Hexactinellid sponge of uncertain affinities.	
Rossellid-like sponge (NMW.2021.3 G.39ii)	???	Rossellid-like sponge.	
Stalked ascosponge (NIGP175889)	???	A stalked ascosponge.	
Conical ascosponge (NMW.2021.3 G.39i)	???	A small, conical ascosponge.	
Piraniidae	???	Piraniid sponge.	
Leptomitidae B	???	Leptomitid sponge.	
Musaspongiidae (?)	???	Probable Musaspongiid sponge.	
undescribed ascospongids I-Q	???	Various ascospongid sponges. Previously recorded as protomonaxonids prior to the erection of the replacement class Ascospongiae.	
undescribed reticulosans AI-AL	???	Various reticulosan sponges.	
Multi-branch graptolite (NMW.2021.3 G.43)	???	A multi-branched, benthic graptolite.	
Lophophore-bearing hemichordate (NMW.2021.3 G.44)	???	A hemichordate with a notable lophophore.	
Dendrocystites-like solutans (NMW.2021.3 G.45)	???	Two Dendrocystites-like solutan fossils.	
Undescribed Asterozoan (NMW.2021.3 G.67)	???	A complete asterozoan fossil.	
Conodont fossils	???	A myriad of conodont fossils.	
Tubicolous problematic fossil (NIGP175892)	???	A tubicolous fossil of problematic affinities.	
Inocladus-like fossil (NMW.2021.3 G.86)	???	A frondose fossil, which bears similarities to the dasycladacean algae Inocladus.	
