= Apatobolus =

Apatobolus Temporal range: Ordovician, ~Early Ordovician–Late Ordovician

Scientific classification
- Kingdom: Animalia
- Phylum: Brachiopoda
- Class: Lingulata
- Order: Lingulida
- Family: Obolidae
- Genus: †Apatobolus; Nazarov & Popov 1980

Type species
- Apatobolus plicatus Nazarov & Popov 1980

Synonyms
- Paldiskites Havliček, 1982

Extinct genus of brachiopod

Apatobolus is an extinct genus of brachiopod that belongs to the extinct family Obolidae. They have thin ovular to subcircular shells. These shells are ornamented by growth lines and low irregular radial plications.

Fossils of Apatobolus have been found throughout the Ordovician period ranging from the Floian of the Early Ordovician to the Sandbian of the Late Ordovician between 477.08 and 454.11 million years ago. Fossils of the species Apatobolus micula have been in Castle Bank, an Ordovician fossil deposit located in Mid Wales. Fossils of Apatobolus anoskelidion have also been found in the Upper Ordovician Malongulli Formation of central New South Wales, Australia.

== Taxonomy ==
Apatobolus is a Lingulid brachiopod of the class Lingulata. They belong to the family Obolidae and more specifically within the subfamily Odolinae. The genus Paldiskites, which also belonged to the subfamily Odolinae, has been synomized under Apatobolus.

=== Species ===
The genus contains multiple species with the type species being Apatobolus plicatu. Below is an incomplete list of described species:

- Apatobolus anoskelidion
- Apatobolus australis
- Apatobolus concava Popov, 2000a
- Apatobolus micula
- Apatobolus plicatus Nazarov & Popov, 1980
- Apatobolus subdivitus
