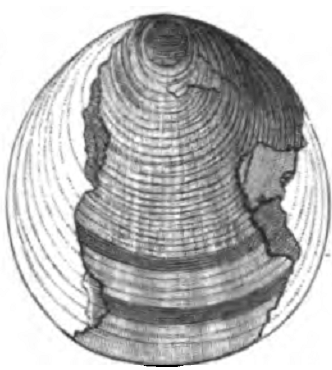
- Lingulella caelata

Scientific classification
- Domain: Eukaryota
- Kingdom: Animalia
- Phylum: Brachiopoda
- Class: Lingulata
- Order: Lingulida
- Superfamily: Linguloidea; Menke, 1828

Families
- †Aulonotretidae; †Dysoristidae; †Elkaniidae; †Eoobolidae; †Lingulasmatidae; †Lingulellotretidae; Lingulidae; †Obolidae; †Paterulidae; †Pseudolingulidae; †Zhanatellidae

= Linguloidea =

Superfamily of marine lamp shells

Linguloidea is a superfamily of brachiopods.
