= Ffabach =

Ffabach Temporal range: Middle Ordovician ~462 Ma
- Holotype specimen and line drawing of the extinct arthropod Ffabach peryglus from Castle Bank, including a close up of its notably long tail spine

Scientific classification
- Kingdom: Animalia
- Phylum: Arthropoda
- Genus: †Ffabach; Pates et al., 2026

Type species
- Ffabach peryglus Pates et al., 2026

Extinct genus of arthropod

Ffabach is an extinct genus of bivalved arthropod of uncertain affinities from the Middle Ordovician aged Gilwern Volcanic Formation of Central Wales. It is a monotypic genus, containing only Ffabach peryglus. Its overall and fine morphology precludes any attempt to assign it to a known group of bivalved arthropods, although what is known is that its notably large appendages likely meant it was a predator, feeding on small invertebrates.

== Discovery and naming ==
Ffabach was discovered in the Darriwilian Castle Bank quarry of the Gilwern Volcanic Formation near Llandrindod, Wales, United Kingdom. The holotype and only known specimen is NMW.2021.3G.12.

The generic name combines the Welsh terms ffa meaning "bean" and bach meaning "little" and is in reference to the shape of Ffabach's carapace. The specific name comes from the Welsh peryglus meaning "dangerous", in reference to the spines on the animal's appendages.

== Description ==
Ffabach has a rounded, preplete bivalved carapace (preplete meaning the point at which the carapace's height is greatest is anterior to the midpoint of the carapace), which is 1 mm (0.04 in) long and 0.5 mm (0.020 in) tall, and bears a darkened 0.1 mm (0.0039 in) rim referred to as a thick doublure. At the anterior end of the carapace, there is a pair of 0.6 mm (0.024 in) long appendages, each consisting of at least 4 podomeres which become shorter distally and end in a sub-triangular structure. Each sub-triangular structure bears at least 4 spines on the ventral margin. Protruding from the carapace at the posterior end are 4 notably short and wide tail segments, with a tail spine 75% the length of the carapace projecting from the last segment.

It has been noted that the "posterior tail spine" could instead be a displaced anterior appendage, with the "anterior" appendages instead being posterior appendages similar to those seen in some bradoriids. In this scenario, the carapace may instead be postplete (meaning the point at which the carapace's height is greatest is posterior to the midpoint of the carapace).

== Taxonomy ==
The taxonomic position of Ffabach is unclear, with it being notably different from the bradoriids, ostracodes and phosphatocopines, which all have their trunk segments covered by the carapace and have all segments bearing appendages. Alongside this, the notably long tail spine is unlike anything seen any of the three afforementioned bivalved euarthropod groups. The carapace has been noted to bear some similarities to the Cambrian eucrustaceans, such as Rehbachiella. Rehbachiella also bears small spines on the inward margin of its antennules, although its carapace outline differs to Ffabach in lacking a marginal rim or doublure, and the spines are shorter than what is seen in Ffabach. Ffabach has also been compared to the hymenocarines, bearing some similarities in its overall morphology to them and other stem-group mandibulates and total-group crustaceans. Alongside this, the hymenocarines have a wide size range, thus making Ffabach's small size a non-issue if it was placed in the order. However, some finer details seen in Ffabach, such as its carapace rim, appendage morphology and elongated tail spine, differ from hymenocarines.

If the interpretation of Ffabach as having a postplete carapace (with the "tail spine" being an anterior appendage and the "anterior appendages" being posterior ones) is correct, then Ffabach does bear similarities to the bradoriid genera Indiana in the outline of its carapace, and Kunmingella with its differentiated posterior appendages. If this is the case, then this would make Ffabach one of four known specimens with preserved, detailed appendages, as well as bolstering knowledge on the longevity of the bradoriids into the Middle Ordovician.

== Paleoecology ==
Due to the notably elongate and spine-bearing anterior appendages of Ffabach, it has been inferred that it likely predated on small invertebrates, unlike some other bivalved arthropods which have more stout and robust appendages built for scavenging.

== Paleoenvironment ==
The Castle Bank lagerstätte where Ffabach was found has preserved remains of a wide variety of extinct organisms. Among those described are at least 17 other taxa of bivalved arthropods, the possible opabiniid Mieridduryn, sponges, worms, graptolites, and many others. The environment itself was open-marine environment deposited near a volcanic island complex on the microcontinent of Avalonia, whilst it was in the southern temperate latitudes of the Middle Ordovician.

== See also ==
- Gloynia — another genus of bivalved arthropod from the Castle Bank lagerstätte that was named in the same paper as Ffabach
