= Discinida =

Discinida Temporal range: Cambrian Stage 2–Recent

Scientific classification
- Domain: Eukaryota
- Kingdom: Animalia
- Phylum: Brachiopoda
- Subphylum: Linguliformea
- Order: Discinida

Superfamilies
Discinoidea
- Discinidae
  - Discina
  - Discinisca
  - Discradisca
  - Pelagodiscus
- †Trematidae
† Botsfordioidea
...
†Acrotheloidea (?)
...

Order of brachiopods

Discinida is an order of brachiopods comprising the extant superfamily Discinoidea, and the extinct superfamilies Botsfordioidea (early—mid-Cambrian) and Acrotheloidea (early Cambrian–Early Ordovician). It represents a sister taxon to the Lingulids, and is possibly paraphyletic with respect to the Acrotretoids.—or the acrotretids are paraphyletic with respect to it. The group displays a broad range of shell structures, some of which incorporate substantial organic or silicified components.
