= Gloynia =

Gloynia Temporal range: Middle Ordovician ~462 Ma
- Holotype specimen and line drawing of the extinct arthropod Gloynia jonesi

Scientific classification
- Kingdom: Animalia
- Phylum: Arthropoda
- Genus: †Gloynia; Pates et al., 2026

Type species
- Gloynia jonesi Pates et al., 2026

Extinct genus of arthropod

Gloynia is an extinct genus of bivalved arthropod of uncertain affinities from the Middle Ordovician aged Gilwern Volcanic Formation of Central Wales. It is a monotypic genus, containing only Gloynia jonesi. Notably, it bears some similarities to myodocope ostracods, although this affinity is tentative, requiring more evidence.

== Discovery and naming ==
Gloynia was discovered in the Darriwilian-aged Castle Bank Lagerstätte, part of Gilwern Volcanic formation, located near Llandrindod, Wales, UK. The holotype is NMW.2021.3G.163, but several other specimens are known.

The generic name is derived from the Welsh glöyn, meaning "butterfly", and refers to the butterfly-shaped outline of the fossils. The specific name honors Clive R. Jones for his research on Ordovician ostracods.

== Description ==
Various fossils of the extinct arthropod genus Gloynia jonesi from Castle Bank.

Gloynia has a paired, bivalved carapace that is typically preserved in a "butterflied" configuration in known fossils, with very little to no compression or wrinkling present. The carapace is lightly rounded, and bears no rostral notch, and ranges from 2.5–3.5 mm (0–0 in) in length, and 4 mm (0 in) in width overall. A dorsal hinge is present, which is either straight or slightly convex. On the valves themselves can be found notable anterodorsal nodes, which are quite prominent, with a faint adductorial sulcus behind these nodes, all of which remains visible even when the carapace is considerably flattened.

== Taxonomy ==
The lack of any preserved soft tissue or discernable diagnostic features on the carapace in Gloynia preclude any confident comparisons with known groups of bivalved arthropods. Despite this, some tentative comparisons can be made to the myodocope ostracods, such as the carapace being notably thin and the presence of large nodes, though the lack of a notch known as a rostral incisure — a major feature known only to the myodocopes — makes any formal assignment to this group difficult. Although the researchers describing Gloynia noted that there are some myodocopes with very subtle rostral incisures, such as Entomozoe and Bolbozoe, the rostral incisure should still be visible if it were present in Gloynia. The two afforementioned myodocopes also share similarities to Gloynia in their raised nodes, although in Entomozoe the nodes are positioned further to the anterior of the carapace, whilst in Bolbozoe they are considerably larger but do sit in the same position.

With this, it has been noted that further evidence is required, preferably with soft tissues preserved, in order to assess whether Gloynia is an early representative of total-group Myodocopa bearing the larger lightly mineralized carapace with a raised area while still being prior to the acquisition of the defining rostral incisure. Until then, Gloynia remains a bivalved arthropod of uncertain affinities.

== Paleoenvironment ==
Other organisms from the Castle Bank Lagerstätte where Gloynia was found include a wide array of worms, sponges, graptolites, and other arthropods (including numerous other bivalved species). The possible opabiniid Mieridduryn was also found at the site. The environment itself was open-marine environment deposited near a volcanic island complex on the microcontinent of Avalonia, whilst it was in the southern temperate latitudes of the Middle Ordovician.

== See also ==
- Ffabach — another genus of bivalved arthropod from the Castle Bank Lagerstätte which was described in the same paper as Gloynia
