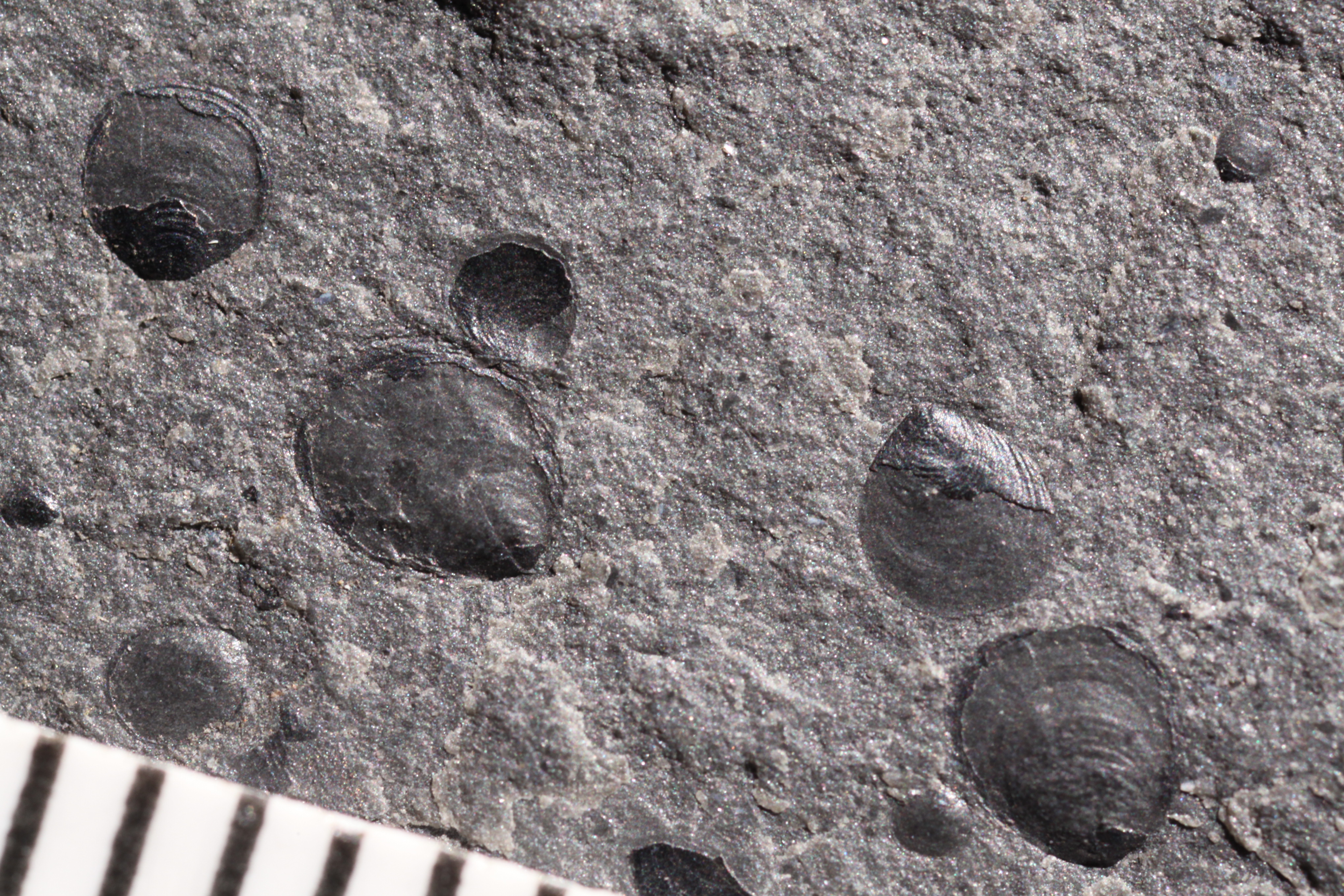
- L. waptaensis fossils from the Burgess Shale

Scientific classification
- Kingdom: Animalia
- Phylum: Brachiopoda
- Class: Lingulata
- Order: Lingulida
- Family: Obolidae
- Genus: Lingulella; Salter, 1886

Type species
- Lingula davisii M'Coy, 1851

Species
- See text

= Lingulella =

Extinct genus of brachiopods

Lingulella is a genus of phosphatic-shelled brachiopod. It is known from the Middle Cambrian Burgess Shale (Canada) to the Upper Ordovician Bromide Formation (United States) in North America. 346 specimens of Lingulella are known from the Greater Phyllopod bed, where they comprise 0.66% of the community.

Some specimens of the brachiopod preserve the pedicle intact, which was long and thin. The brachiopod is thought to have been a generalist, as it appears consistently throughout the strata of the Greater Phyllopod bed.

== Species ==
The following species have been identified:

- L. agaue Mergl & Kordule, 2008
- L. alabamensis
- L. alata Holmer, 1989
- L. alia
- L. allani Walcott, 1912
- L. amabilis Reed, 1917
- L. angustata
- L. angustior Reed, 1917
- L. antiquissima Jeremejew, 1856
- L. arachne Barrande, 1879
- L. arctica Walcott, 1924
- L. arguta
- L. augusta
- L. afga
- L. bella
- L. bellisculpta Clark, 1935
- L. bohemica Koliha, 1921
- L. borealis
- L. brainerdi
- L. brevis Portlock, 1843
- L. bridgei
- L. bukovensis Koliha, 1924
- L. burnetensis
- L. buttsi
- L. bynguanoensis Roberts in Roberts & Jell, 1990
- L. caelata
- L. carrickensis Reed, 1917
- L. chapa
- L. chengjiangensis Jin, Hou & Wang, 1993
- L. chinchiaensis Kobayashi, 1933
- L. chinensis
- L. chuarensis
- L. circa Xu & Liu, 1984
- L. clarkei
- L. clivosa Pelman, 1983
- L. clochensis?
- L. columba
- L. concinna
- L. corralensis Rusconi, 1950?
- L. damesi
- L. davisii (McCoy, 1851)
- L. decorticata
- L. delgadoi
- L. derwentii Postlethwaite, 1897
- L. desiderata
- L. dimorpha
- L. displosa Williams 1974
- L. dotensis Kobayashi, 1934
- L. dusaaulti Patte, 1929
- L. dzhavodiensis Sobolev, 1975
- L. elata Pelman, 1986
- L. ellsi
- L. endopunctata
- L. eucharis Resser, 1939
- L. euglypha
- L. exilis
- L. exortiva
- L. expulsa Barrande, 1879
- L. fenxiangensis Wang, 1978
- L. ferox
- L. ferruginea Salter in Salter & Hicks, 1867
- L. fostermontensis
- L. franklinensis
- L. galba
- L. genei
- L. glypta
- L. grandis
- L. granvillensis
- L. haimantensis
- L. halei
- L. hatai
- L. havliceki Mergl & Slehoferova, 1990
- L. hayaeri
- L. hayesi
- L. hesperia Williams & Curry, 1985
- L. hilli
- L. hinganensis Su, 1980
- L. hitka
- L. howardi Postlethwaite, 1897
- L. hsiensis
- L. humaensis Su, 1980
- L. huronensis
- L. ibicus
- L. idahoensis Resser, 1938
- L. iddingsi
- L. ino
- L. insons Barr.
- L. intermedia Liu, Zhu & Xue, 1985
- L. irene
- L. iris
- L. jakutensis
- L. jerseyensis
- L. kalpinensis Zhang, 1981
- L. kanabensis Resser, 1945
- L. kanlingensis Zhang, 1981
- L. kayseri Sun, 1923
- L. kiddoi
- L. kingstonensis
- L. kitatiensis Aksarina, 1978
- L. lasherensis Rusconi, 1951
- L. lata Koliha, 1924
- L. lepis Salter, 1866
- L. libecovensis Koliha, 1918
- L. lineolata
- L. linguata Pelman, 1977
- L. lirata
- L. lithuanica Korkutis, 1971
- L. liui
- L. lochmanae
- L. longa
- L. longula
- L. major Teixeira, Ribeiro & Silva, 1964
- L. manchuriensis
- L. mania
- L. manticula
- L. marcia Walcott, 1911
- L. martillensis Rusconi, 1952
- L. matthewi Koliha, 1921
- L. mcconnelli Walcott, 1889
- L. mechos/nechos
- L. mehaeigueni Legrand, 1974
- L. miltoni
- L. minus
- L. minuscula Sobolev, 1975
- L. modesta Lochman, 1940
- L. montana Fenton & Fenton, 1936
- L. monticola
- L. moosensis<
- L. morsei
- L. mosia
- L. murcia var. templetonensis Chapman, 1929
- L. narrawayi
- L. nepos
- L. nerva
- L. nicholsoni Callaway, 1877
- L. nina
- L. nicholsoni Callaway, 1877
- L. paliformis
- L. parvula
- L. pela densis Rusconi, 1951
- L. pennsylvanica
- L. perattenuata
- L. petalon Davidson, 1868
- L. pingchouensis
- L. pingchouensis
- L. proveedorensis Cooper, 1952/1954
- L. putilla
- L. quadrilateralis
- L. quaestor Reed, 1917
- L. raymondi Clark, 1924
- L. remius/remus
- L. reticulata
- L. rideauensis
- L. rotunda Pelman, 1977
- L. rugosilinea
- L. sanfangensis
- L. sculptilis
- L. sequens
- L. shansiensis
- L. siliqua
- L. silurica Yadrenkina, 1986
- L. solitariensis Rusconi, 1950
- L. spicata
- L. spitiensis
- L. stonei
- L. ubdivisa Rusconi, 1950
- L. subfusula Su, 1980
- L. subparallela
- L. sufi Mergl & Slehoferova, 1990
- L. sulcata Barrande, 1879
- L. taijiangensis Huang, Wang, Zhao & Dai, 1994
- L. takayamai
- L. tangshihensias
- L. tarpa
- L. tenuitesta
- L. terranovica Howell, 1943
- L. texana
- L. texana
- L. thems mckeei Resser, 1945
- L. tomkolensis Kobayashi, 1934
- L. tsuchidai
- L. turneri
- L. variabilis Pelman, 1977
- L. variolata
- L. vermontensis
- L. virginiensis
- L. viridis Cobbold, 1921
- L. wanniecki
- L. waptaensis
- L. welleri
- L. wirthi
- L. wongi
- L. yabei
- L. yingtzuensie Kobayashi, 1931
- L. yongchengensis Zeng, 1977
- L. yuechiensis Xu, 1978
- L. zejszneri Bednarczyk, 1960
- L. zetus
- L. zeus
- L. zulupeana Rusconi, 1954
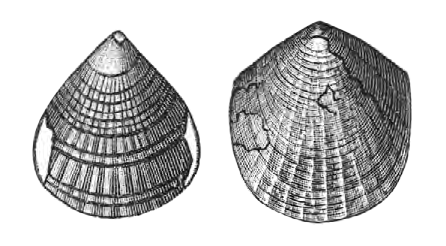
Lingulella caelata

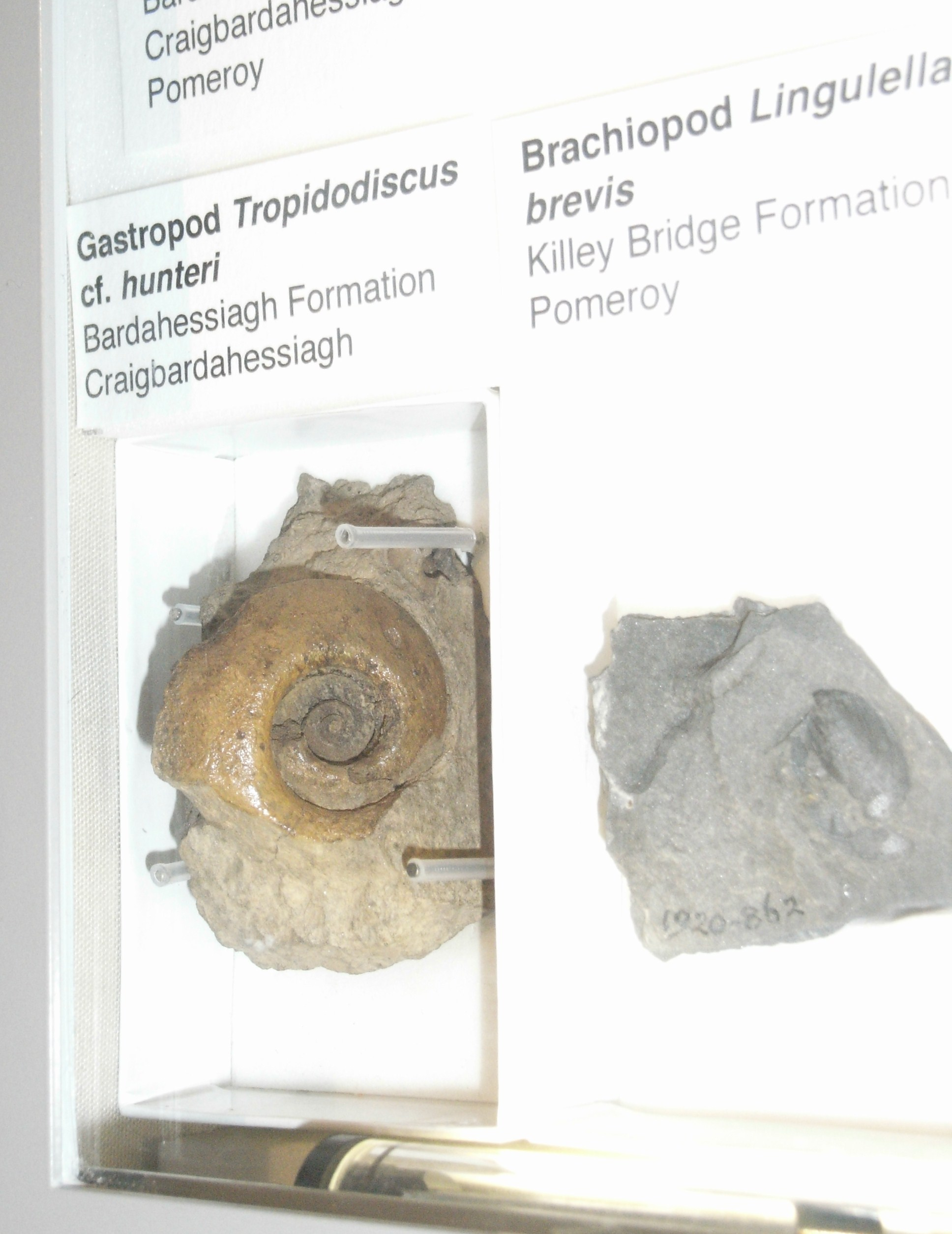
Lingulella brevis (right)

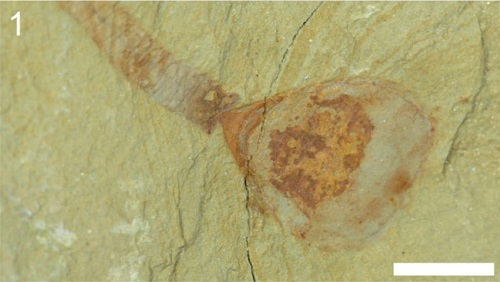
Lingulella chengjiangensis specimen preserving the pedicle

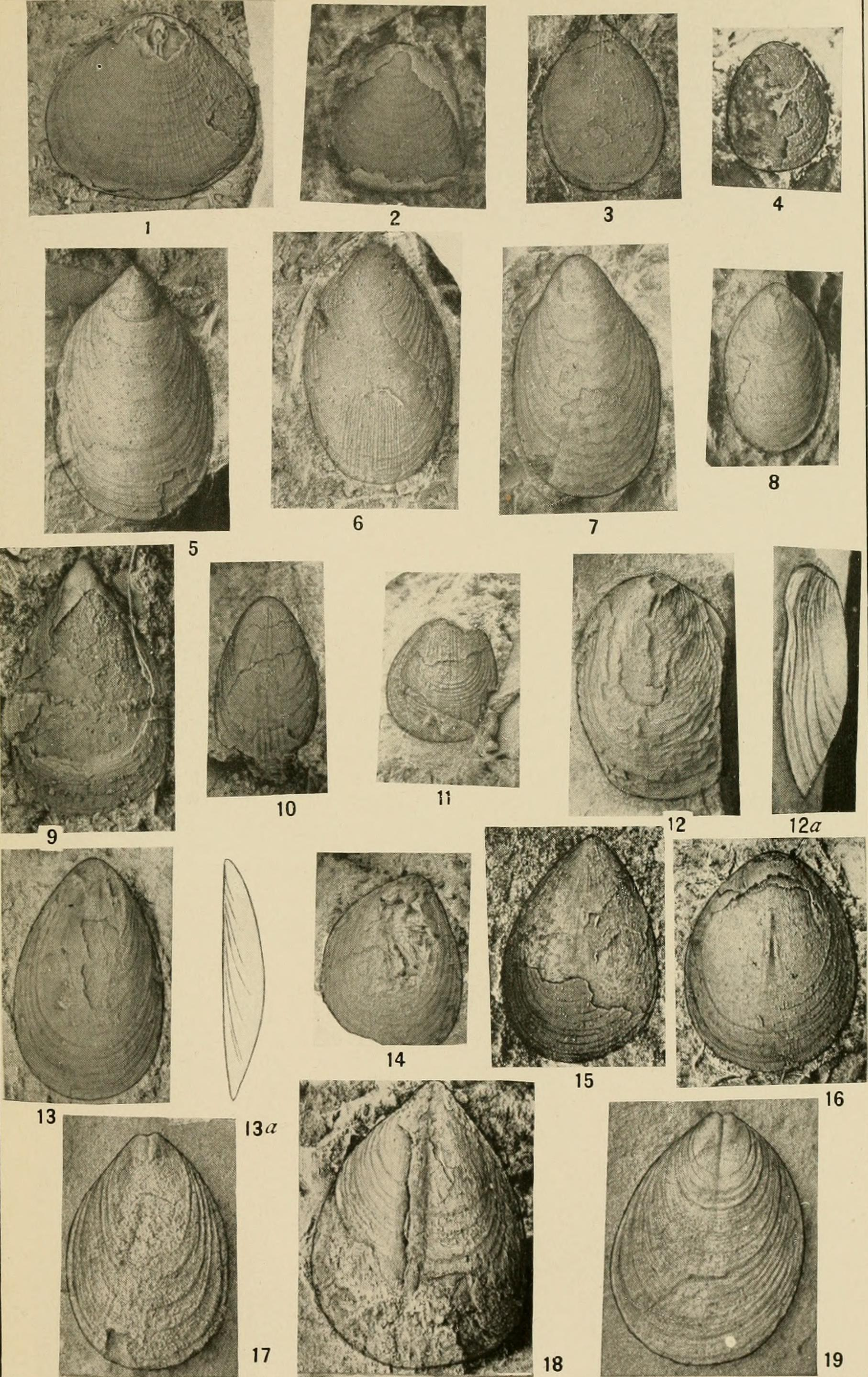
Lingulella ninus

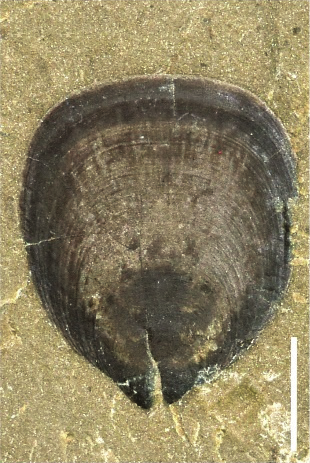
Lingulella sp. from the Linyi Lagerstätte

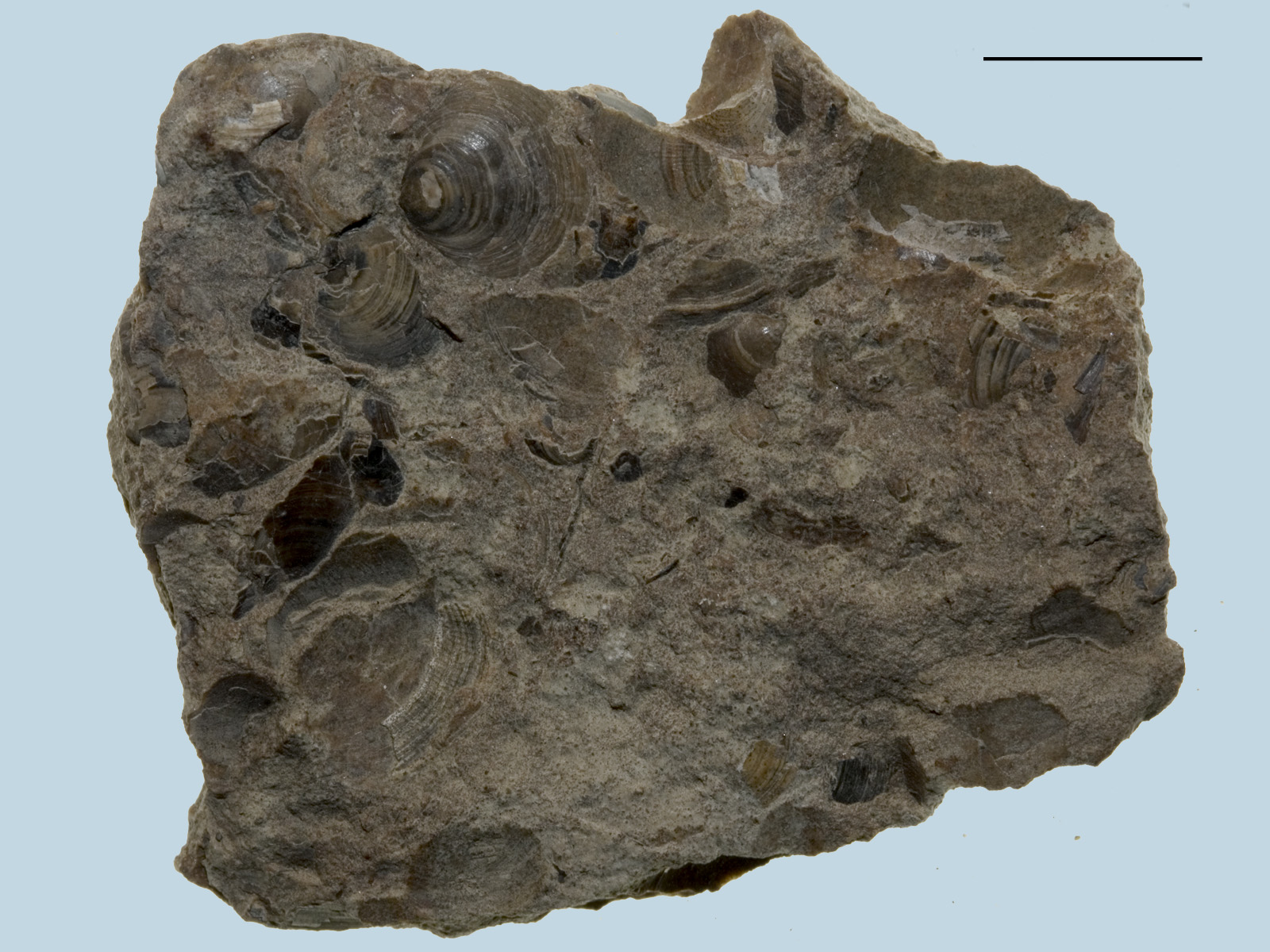
Lingulella ampla

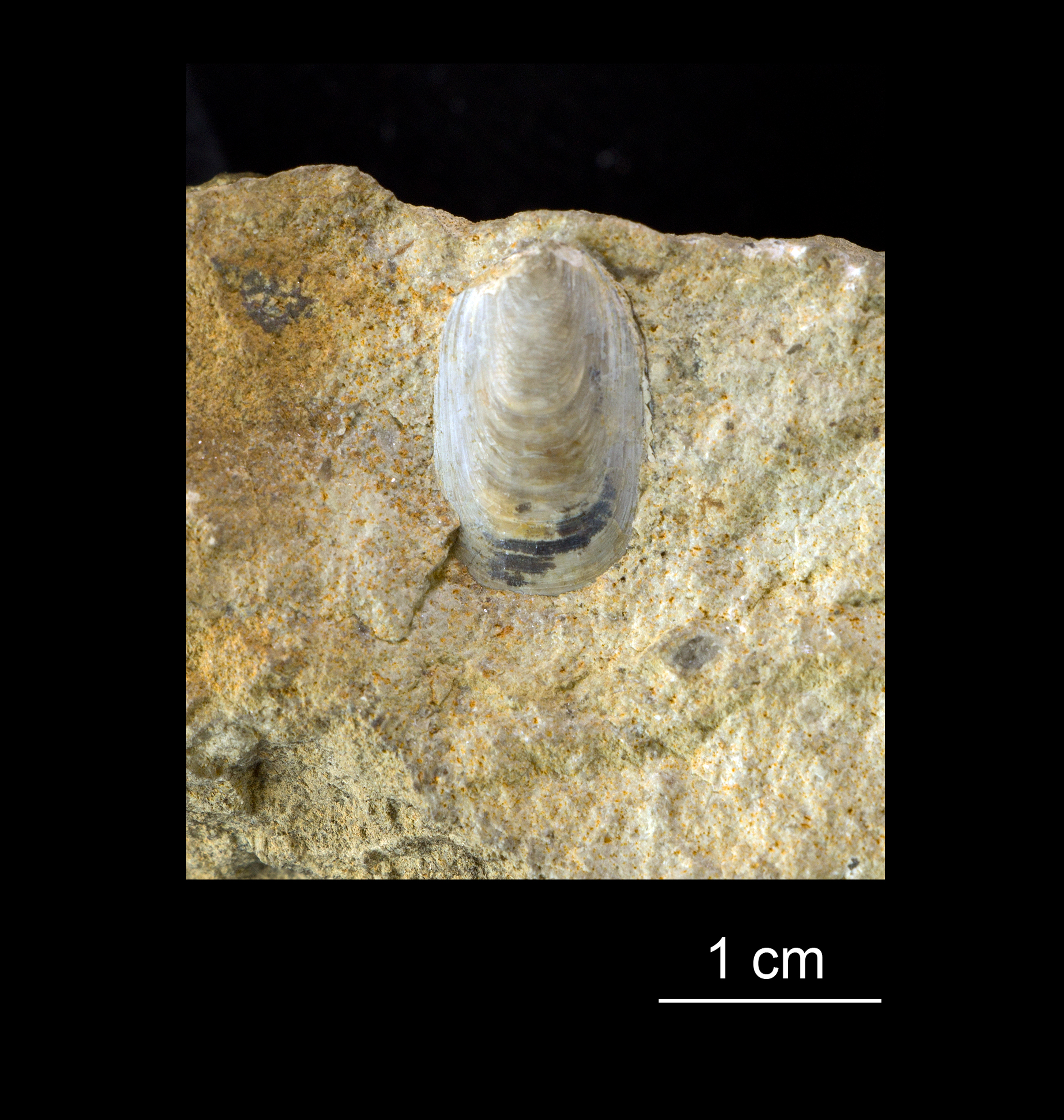
Lingulella lingulaeformis

=== Reclassified species ===
- L. acuminata Walcott, 1908 (current name Lingulepis acuminata Conrad)
- L. acuta Pelman, 1977
- L. acutangula (current name Lingulepis acutangulus Roemer, 1849)
- L. africana Legrand, 1974

== Distribution ==
Fossils of Lingulella have been found in:

Cambrian

Australia, Canada (British Columbia, New Brunswick), China, the Czech Republic, Denmark, Greenland, India, Italy, Kazakhstan, Mexico, New Zealand, Norway, Pakistan, Poland, the Russian Federation, Sweden, the United Kingdom, and the United States (Arizona, California, Idaho, Montana, New York, Pennsylvania, South Dakota, Utah, Wisconsin, Wyoming).

Ordovician

Argentina, Australia, Canada (Newfoundland and Labrador, Quebec), China, Colombia (Serranía de la Macarena, Meta), the Czech Republic, France, Ireland, Mexico, Peru, Poland, the Russian Federation, Spain, Sweden, the United Kingdom, and the United States (Alabama, Kentucky, Montana, Nevada, New York, North Dakota, Oklahoma, Tennessee, Utah, Vermont, Virginia).

Devonian

Vietnam.
