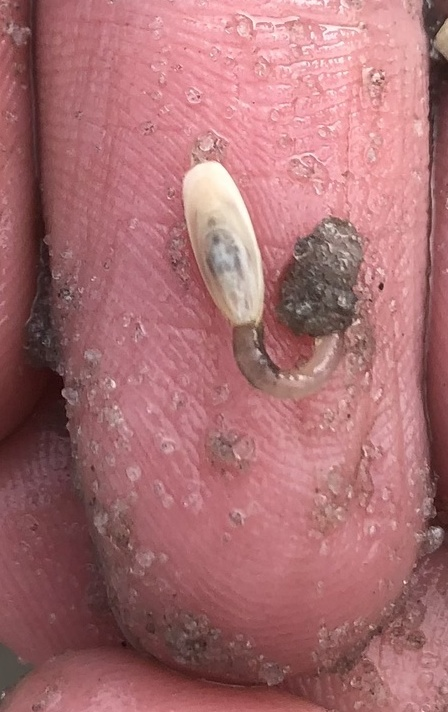
- Glottidia pyramidata, Florida

Scientific classification
- Domain: Eukaryota
- Kingdom: Animalia
- Phylum: Brachiopoda
- Class: Lingulata
- Order: Lingulida
- Family: Lingulidae
- Genus: Glottidia; Dall, 1870

= Glottidia =

Genus of brachiopods

Glottidia is a genus of brachiopods belonging to the family Lingulidae.

The species of this genus are found in Europe and Northern America.

Species:

- Glottidia albida (Hinds, 1844)
- Glottidia audebarti (Broderip, 1835)
- Glottidia bravardi Figueiras & Martinez, 1995
- Glottidia inexpectans Olsson, 1914
- Glottidia palmeri Dall, 1871
- Glottidia pyramidata (Stimpson, 1860)
- Glottidia semen (Broderip, 1835)
