= D. striata =

D. striata may refer to:

- Dendroica striata, the blackpoll warbler, a bird species found in northern North America
- Discina striata, a brachiopod species
