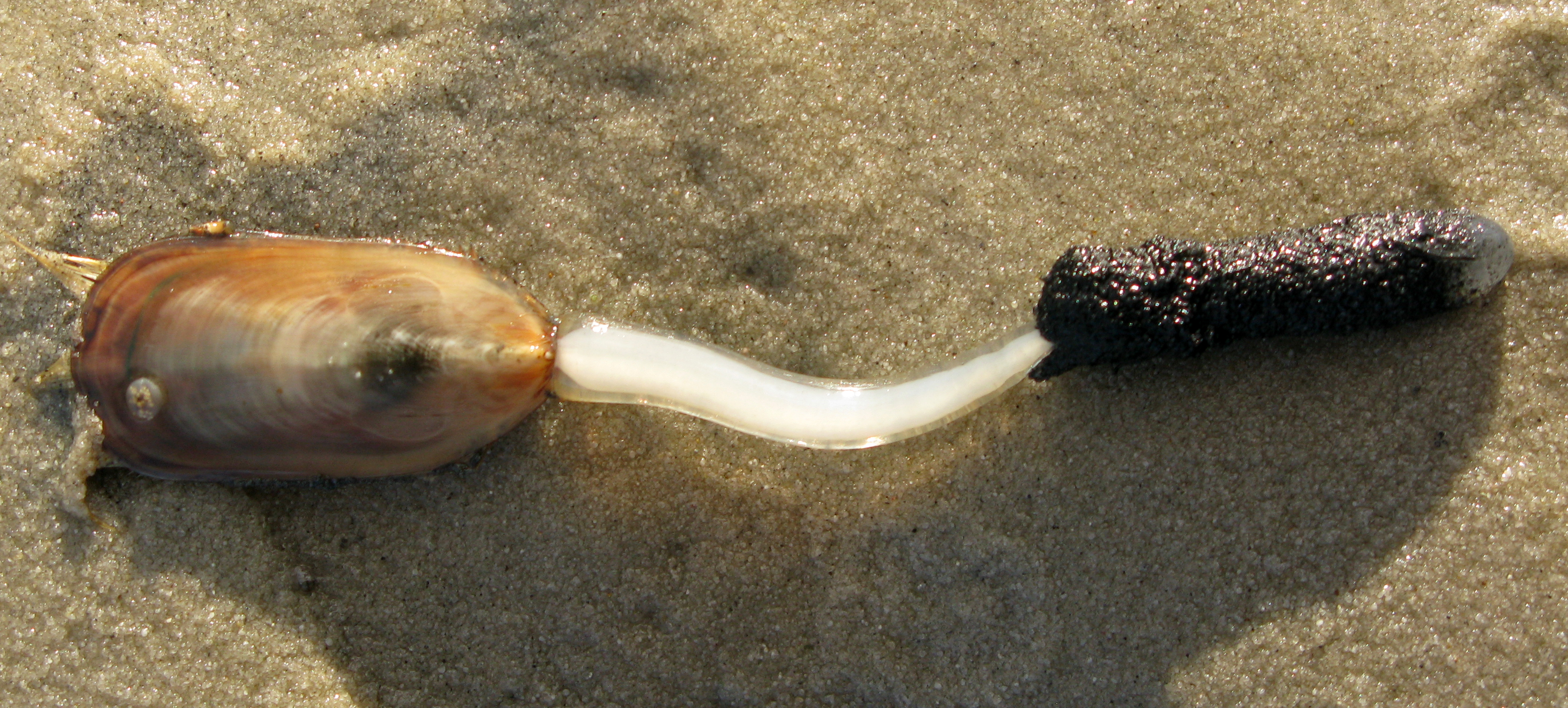
- Lingula anatina from Stradbroke Island, Australia.

Scientific classification
- Kingdom: Animalia
- Phylum: Brachiopoda
- Class: Lingulata
- Order: Lingulida
- Family: Lingulidae
- Genus: Lingula
- Species: L. anatina

Binomial name
- Lingula anatina Lamarck, 1801

= Lingula anatina =

Species of brachiopod

Lingula anatina is a brachiopod species in the genus Lingula. Like others in its genus, L. anatina is a filter feeder that uses a lophophore to extract food from water. They burrow in the sand of their brackish intertidal habitat.

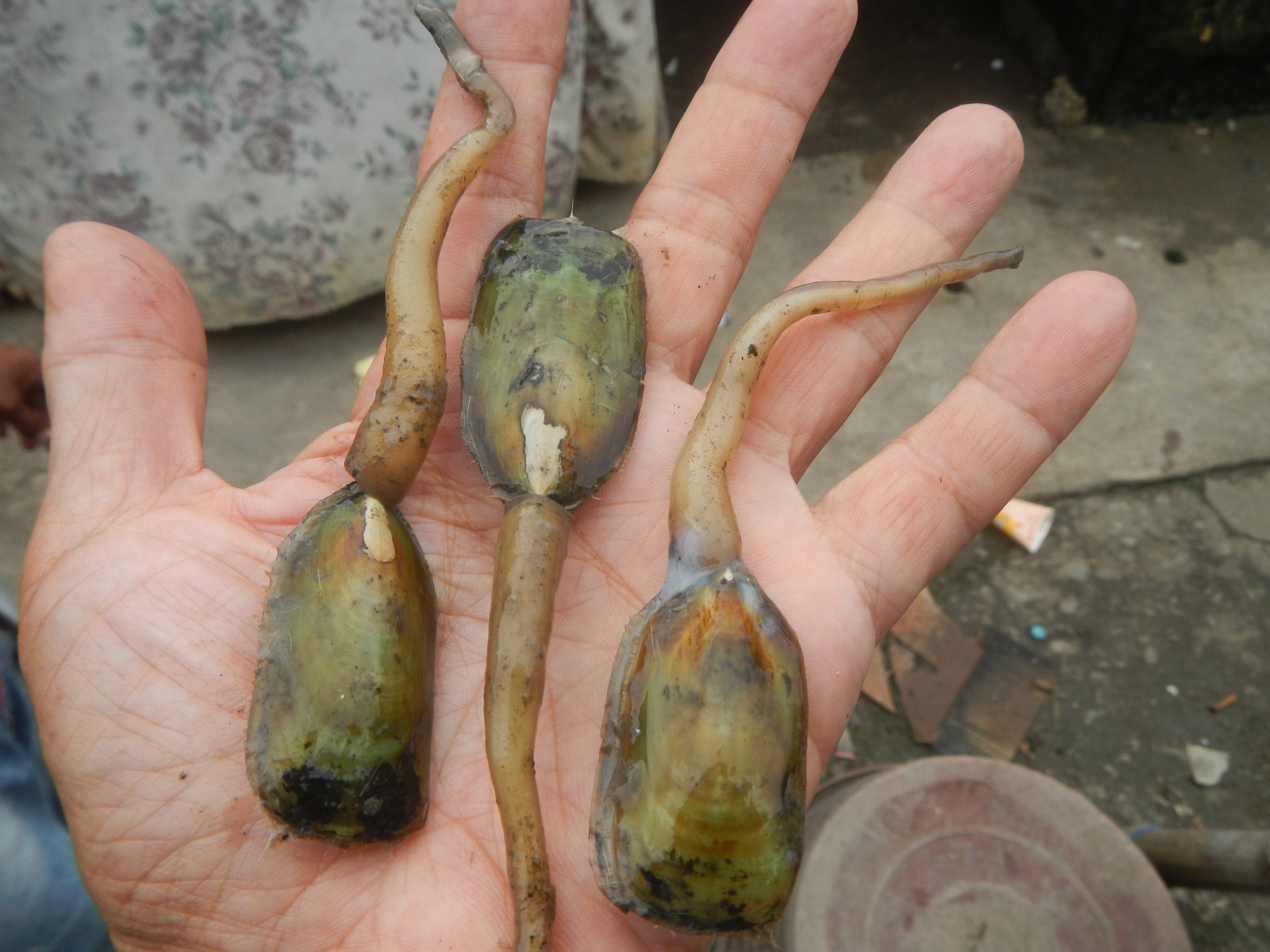
Lingula anatina sold as shellfish in a marketplace in Hagonoy, Philippines.
