= Acanthotretella =

Acanthotretella Temporal range: Miaolingian – ~505 Ma

Scientific classification
- Kingdom: Animalia
- Phylum: Brachiopoda
- Class: Lingulata
- Order: †Siphonotretida
- Genus: †Acanthotretella; Holmer & Caron, 2006

Type species
- Acanthotretella spinosa Holmer & Caron, 2006

Species
- A. decaius; A. spinosa

Extinct genus of brachiopods

Acanthotretella is a genus of brachiopods known from the Burgess Shale and the Guanshan fauna.

Their spines are proposed to be homologous with those of the Siphonotretids.

== Species ==
- Acanthotretella decaius Hu, Zhang, Holmer & Skovsted, 2010
- Acanthotretella spinosa Holmer & Caron, 2006
