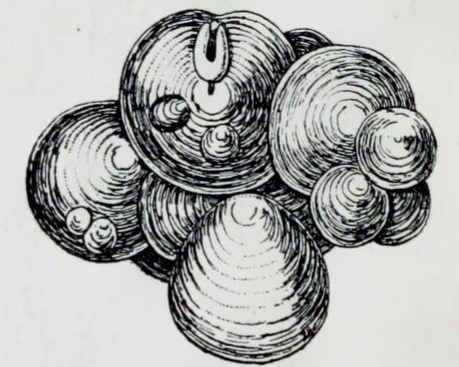
- Discinisca lamellosa, a group of old and young specimens; the largest showing the foramen in the peduncle valve; the rest showing brachial valves

Scientific classification
- Domain: Eukaryota
- Kingdom: Animalia
- Phylum: Brachiopoda
- Order: Discinida
- Family: Discinidae
- Genus: Discinisca; Sowerby, 1822

Species
- D. laevis (Sowerby, 1822); D. lamellosa (Broderip, 1834); D. lamellosa sensu d'Hondt, 1976; D. messi (Damián E. Pérez et al., 2023); D. rikuzenensis (Hatai, 1940); D. suborbicularis (Smirnova et al., 2017); D. tenuis (Sowerby)

= Discinisca =

Discinisca Temporal range: Early Devonian–Recent

Extinct genus of brachiopods

Discinisca is a genus of brachiopods with fossils dating back from the Early Devonian to the Pliocene of Africa, Europe, North America, and New Zealand.

Living individuals incorporate tablets of silica into their shell.
