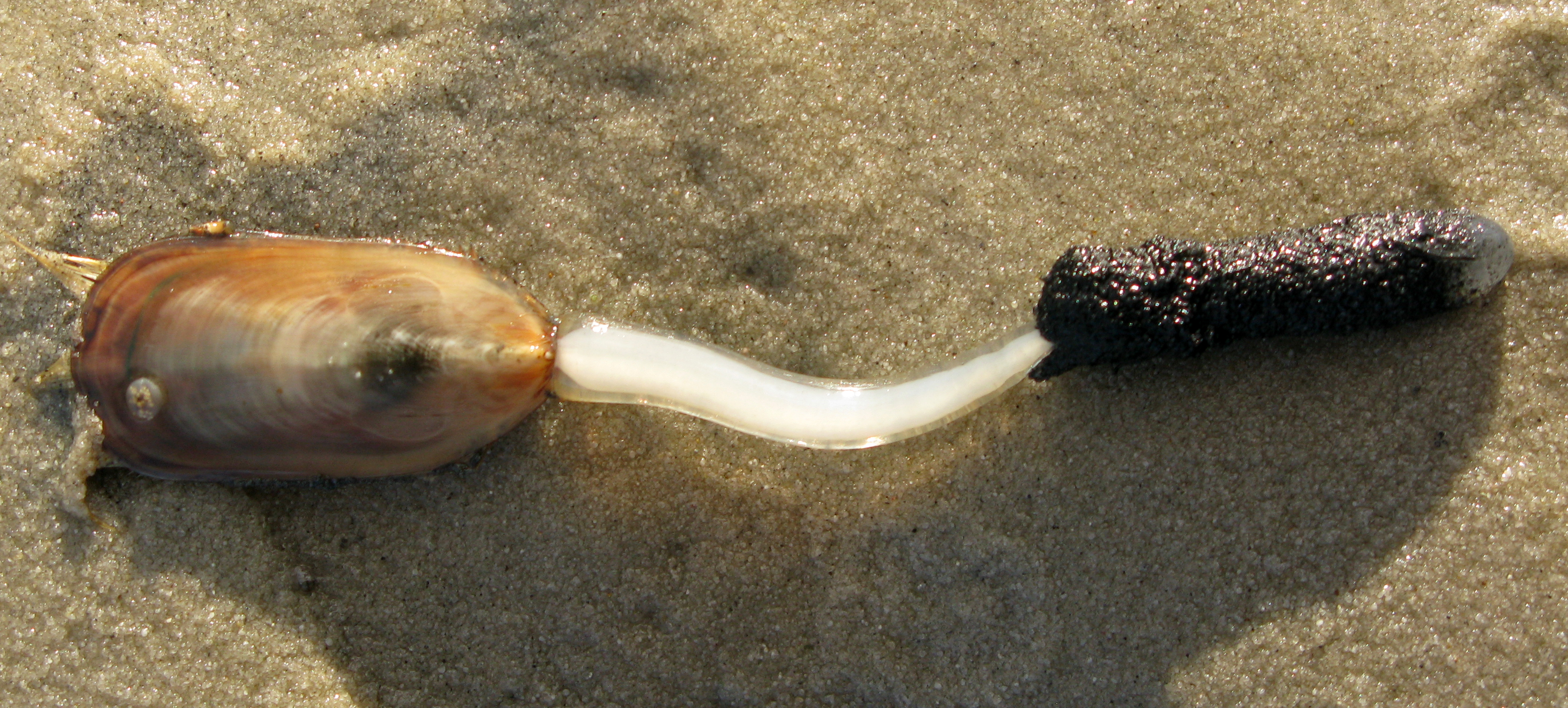

Scientific classification
- Kingdom: Animalia
- Phylum: Brachiopoda
- Class: Lingulata
- Order: Lingulida
- Superfamily: Linguloidea
- Family: Lingulidae; Menke, 1828

Type species
- Lingula anatina Lamarck, 1801

Genera
- †Argentiella Archbold, Cisterna & Sterren, 2005; †Credolingula Smirnova & Ushatinskaya, 2001; †Dignomia Hall, 1871; Glottidia Dall, 1870; Lingula Bruguière, 1791; †Lingularia Biernat & Emig, 1993; †Semilingula Egorov & Popov, 1990; †Sinoglottidia Peng & Shi, 2008; †Sinolingularia Peng & Shi, 2008

= Lingulidae =

Family of brachiopods

Lingulidae is a family of brachiopods.
