= Discradisca =

Scientific classification
- Domain: Eukaryota
- Kingdom: Animalia
- Phylum: Brachiopoda
- Order: Discinida
- Family: Discinidae
- Genus: Discradisca; Stenzel, 1964

Species
- D. antillarum; D. cumingi; D. indica; D. sparselineata; D. stella; D. strigata

Genus of brachiopods

Discradisca is a genus of brachiopods.
