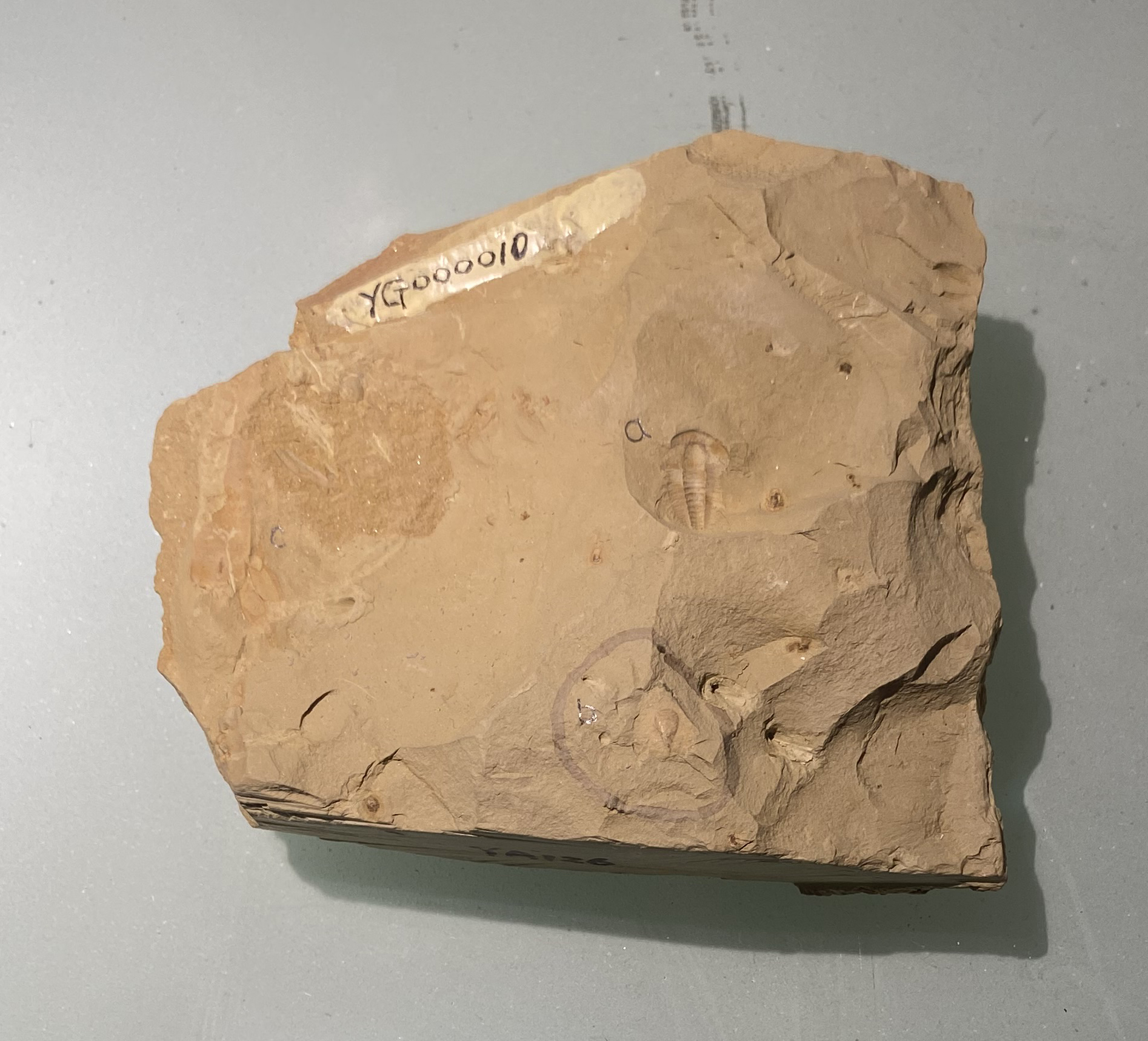
- Fossil of Lingulellotreta malongensis in Yuxi Museum

Scientific classification
- Kingdom: Animalia
- Phylum: Brachiopoda
- Class: Lingulata
- Order: Lingulida
- Family: †Lingulellotretidae; Koneva & Popov, 1983

= Lingulellotretidae =

Lingulellotretidae Temporal range: Cambrian

Extinct family of shelled animals

Lingulellotretidae is an extinct family of brachiopods, with an extended pseudointerarea, including some soft-shelled representatives.

The lingulellotretids are possibly close relatives of the Siphonotretids.

Soft tissue is occasionally known.
