= Acrotheloidea =

Acrotheloidea Temporal range: Cambrian Stage 2–Early Ordovician

Scientific classification
- Domain: Eukaryota
- Kingdom: Animalia
- Phylum: Brachiopoda
- Order: Discinida
- Superfamily: †Acrotheloidea

Families
- Acrothelidae; Botsfordiidae Schindewolf, 1955

Superfamily of brachiopods (fossil)

Acrotheloidea is an extinct superfamily of discinid brachiopods, that lived from the Early Cambrian to Early Ordovician periods, c. 538 – 471 Ma. They are sometimes alternatively ascribed to the lingulids.

There is evidence for an evolutionary transition through the genera Eoobolus, Pustulobolus, and Bostfordia to the Acrotretids. Acrotheloids have an apical foramen.
