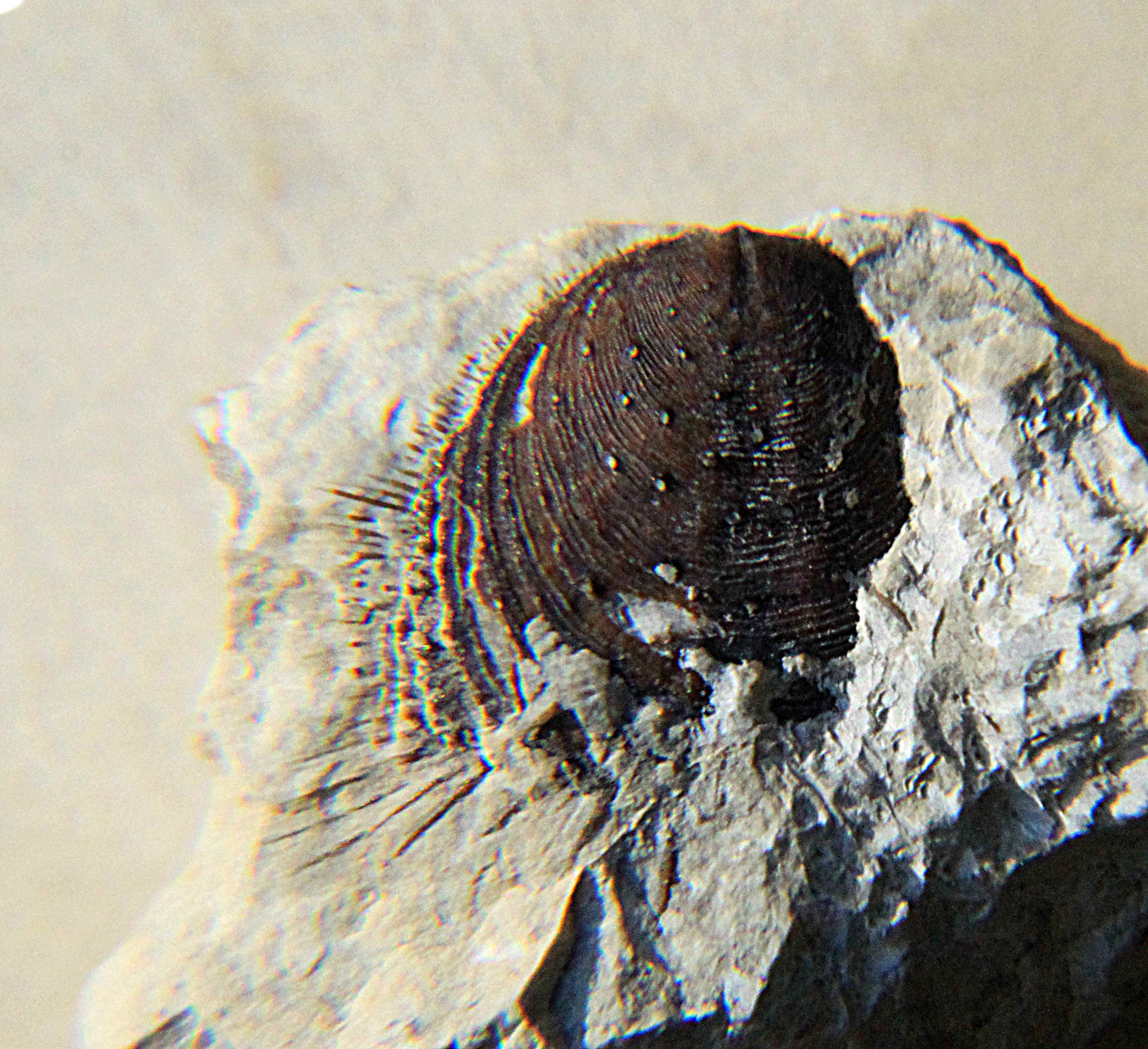
- "Schizambon" [sic] perspinosum, a siphonotretid from the Upper Ordovician of Oklahoma

Scientific classification
- Kingdom: Animalia
- Phylum: Brachiopoda
- Class: Lingulata
- Order: †Siphonotretida; Kuhn, 1949
- Superfamily: †Siphonotretoidea; Kutorga, 1848
- Family: †Siphonotretidae; Kutorga, 1848

= Siphonotretida =

Siphonotretida Temporal range: Cambrian Stage 4–Ludlow

Extinct order of marine lamp shells

Siphonotretida is an extinct order of linguliform brachiopods in the class Lingulata. The order is equivalent to the sole superfamily Siphonotretoidea, itself containing the sole family Siphonotretidae. Siphonotretoids were originally named as a superfamily of Acrotretida, before being raised to their own order.

== Evolution ==
Spihonotretids were most abundant in the late Cambrian and Early Ordovician (Furongian to Floian), and were traditionally considered to have gone extinct in the Upper Ordovician ("Ashgill"). More recently, new siphonotretids have been described as early as Cambrian Stage 4 (Schizambon) and as late as the Ludlow Epoch of the Silurian (Orbaspina). Isolated fragments are even known from the Emsian stage of the Lower Devonian. Archaic Cambrian-style siphonotretids such as Schizambon and Helmersenia, with basic forms of ornamentation, populated the shores of Baltica, Laurentia, and Gondwana by the start of the Ordovician. In the late Tremadocian, advanced Ordovician-style spiny siphonotretids spread out from temperate waters around Gondwana and mostly replaced their older relatives.

== Anatomy ==
Siphonotretids had simple, rounded shells, with an ornamentation of hollow spines or rarely pointed tubercles. The shell is usually ventribiconvex (both valves convex, the ventral valve moreso) and composed of microscopic granules of apatite. The inner surface of the shell tends to be weakly mineralized, so many aspects of the musculature and other soft anatomy are difficult to estimate in most species. Available data supports comparison to the internal structures of lingulids. Siphonotretids may be related to the linguloid families Lingulellotretidae or Dysoristidae.

Similar to acrotretides, the pedicle foramen was set at the apex of the ventral valve, though it is often elongated into a tubular groove opening forwards. This groove lies on a triangular extension of the ventral valve, known as a pseudointerarea, which overhangs the dorsal valve. Unlike acrotretides, the adult shell is spinose while the larval shell lacks a pitted texture.

The possible siphonotretid Acanthotretella is known from several exceptionally-preserved specimens which reveal lingulid-like traits such as setae, a spirolophous lophophore and U-shaped gut. However, the shell was poorly mineralized and sends out a very long, stalk-like pedicle, which in one specimen was attached to a fragment of algae. Combined with a lightweight shell, the pedicle likely helped to suspend the body above the seabed, an epibenthic lifestyle dissimilar to the infaunal (burrowing) lingulids.

== List of genera ==
- Acanthambonia Cooper, 1956 (Ordovician, "Arenig" to "Ashgill")
- Acanthotretella? Holmer & Caron, 2006 (mid-Cambrian, "Stage 4" to Miaolingian; provisionally assigned to Siphonotretoidea)
- Alichovia Goryanskij, 1969 (Ordovician, "Tremadoc" to "Caradoc")
- Collarotrella Mergl, 1997 (Ordovician, "Arenig")
- Celdobolus Havlíček, 1982 (Ordovician, "Arenig")
- Cyrbasiotreta Williams & Curry, 1985 (Middle Ordovician, "Arenig")
- Eosiphonotreta Havlíček, 1982 (Lower to Middle Ordovician, "Arenig" to "Llanvirn")
- Gorchakovia Popov & Khazanovitch (in Popov et al., 1989) (Upper Cambrian)
- Helmersenia Pander (in von Helmersen, 1861) (Upper Cambrian to Ordovician)
- Karnotreta Williams & Curry, 1985 (Middle Ordovician, "Arenig")
- Mesotreta Kutorga, 1848 (Lower to Middle Ordovician, "Arenig")
- Multispinula Rowell, 1962 (Middle to Upper Ordovician, "Arenig" to "Ashgill")
- Nushbiella Popov (in Kolobova & Popov, 1986) (Middle to Upper Ordovician, "Arenig" to "Caradoc")
- Oaxaquiatreta Streng, Mellbin, Landing & Keppie, 2011 (Upper Cambrian to Tremadocian)
- Orbaspina Valentine & Brock, 2003 (Silurian, late Llandovery to Ludlow)
- Quasithambonia? Bednarczyk & Biernat, 1978 (Ordovician, "Arenig")
- Schizambon Walcott, 1884 (Middle Cambrian to Ordovician, "Arenig")
- Siphonobolus Havlíček, 1982 (Ordovician, "Tremadoc" to "Arenig")
- Siphonotreta de Verneuil, 1845 (Ordovician, "Arenig" to "Caradoc")
- Siphonotretella Popov & Holmer, 1994 (Lower Ordovician, "Tremadoc" to "Arenig")
