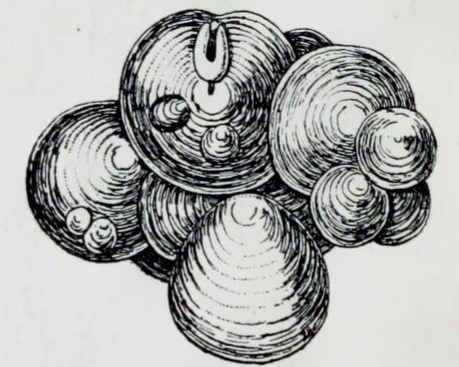

Scientific classification
- Domain: Eukaryota
- Kingdom: Animalia
- Phylum: Brachiopoda
- Order: Discinida
- Superfamily: Discinoidea
- Family: Discinidae

Genera
- Discina; Discinisca; Discradisca; Pelagodiscus

= Discinidae =

Family of shelled animals

Discinidae is a family in the brachiopod superfamily Discinoidea. Unlike most brachiopods, which have uniformly calcitic or phosphatic shells, modern-day discinids incorporate tablets of silica into their valves. These are covered with vesicles into which the siliceous tablets are cemented, much like a closely packed mosaic, and held together with apatite. These vesicles eventually degrade, but nevertheless still leave an imprint on the shell itself. It has been suggested that this siliceous biomineralisation might also have occurred amongst some of the earliest Paleozoic brachiopods because similar patterns of shell imprints have been observed amongst them too.
