= Botsfordioidea =

Botsfordioidea Temporal range: Cambrian Series 2–Miaolingian

Scientific classification
- Domain: Eukaryota
- Kingdom: Animalia
- Phylum: Brachiopoda
- Order: Discinida
- Superfamily: †Botsfordioidea

Superfamily of marine lamp shells

Botsfordioidea is a superfamily of Discinid brachiopods.
