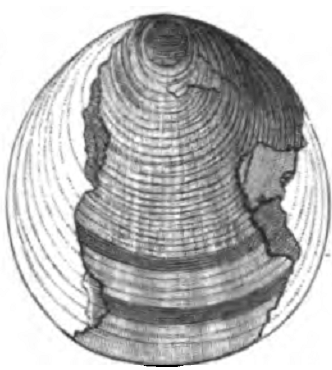
- Lingulella caelata
- Fordinia perfecta

Scientific classification
- Kingdom: Animalia
- Phylum: Brachiopoda
- Class: Lingulata
- Order: Lingulida
- Superfamily: Linguloidea
- Family: Obolidae; King, 1846

Subfamilies
- Elliptoglossinae; Glossellinae; Obolinae

= Obolidae =

Extinct family of brachiopods

Obolidae is an extinct family of brachiopods that belongs to the superfamily Linguloidea. Obolids occurred during the Paleozoic from the Cambrian period and lasted until the Carboniferouse period.

== Description ==
Fossil of Pseudobolus.

Obolid brachiopods exhibit a great amount of shell shape and outline variability from genera to genera. Their shells are either unequivalved of subequivalved meaning that they are unequal or slightly unequal in size. Their larval shells are smooth.

The shells of genera belonging to the subfamily Obolinae have rounded and elongated shells that have subovular to subtriangular morphology. Their shells are also unequivalved.

== Ecology ==
Members of this family are thought to be burrowers and were the dominant group from the Late Cambrian to Middle Ordovician. During the Late Ordovician, their diversity rapidly declined which is thought to have been due to competition with burrowing bivalves. Their burrowing is also thought to have increased bioturbation of their environments is thought to have contributed to their extinction. The subfamily Elliptoglossinae went extinct in the Ordovician with Glossellinae occurring into the Silurian with a possible Devonian fossil record. The last subfamily, Obolinae, occurred into the Carboniferous period before becoming extinct.

== Taxonomy ==
The family contains many genera that are organized into several subfamilies. The type genus of Obolidae is Obolus. Below is a list of subfamilies and genera placed within them:

- Elliptoglossinae
  - Elliptoglossa
  - Lingulops
- Glossellinae
  - Anx
  - Casquella
  - Ectenoglossa
  - Fezzanoglossa
  - Glossella
  - Glyptoglossella
  - Lachrymula
  - Leptobolus
  - Libyaeglossa
  - Pachyglossella
  - Plectoglossa
  - Rafanoglossa
  - Spondyglossella
  - Tunisiglossa
- Obolinae
  - Aksarinaia
  - Anomaloglossa
  - Apatobolus
  - Atansoria
  - Barbatulella
  - Dicellomus
  - Expellobolus
  - Experilingula
  - Fordinia
  - Foveola
  - Gorjanskya
  - Leontiella
  - Leptembolon
  - Lindinella
  - Lingulepis
  - Lingulobolus
  - Notiobolus
  - Obolopsis
  - Obolus
  - Oepikites
  - Palaeobolus
  - Palaeoglossa
  - Palaeoschmidtites
  - Pseudobolus
  - Schmidtites
  - Sinoglossa
  - Spinilingula
  - Squamilingulella
  - Trigonoglossa
  - Westonia
  - Westonisca
- Uncertain Subfamily
  - Eodicellomus
  - Lingulella
