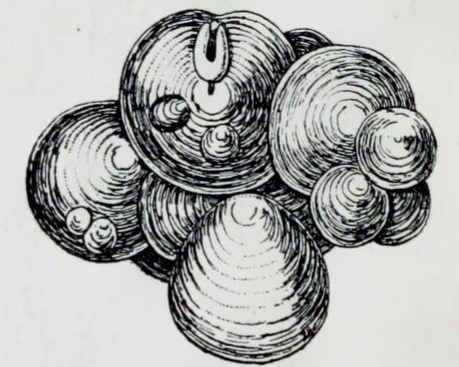
- Discinisca lamellosa

Scientific classification
- Domain: Eukaryota
- Kingdom: Animalia
- Phylum: Brachiopoda
- Order: Discinida
- Superfamily: Discinoidea

Families
- Discinidae; †Trematidae

= Discinoidea =

Superfamily of marine lamp shells

Discinoidea is a superfamily of Discinid brachiopods. For discussion of Discinid taxonomy, see Discinidae. The history of the superfamily Discinoidea spans almost the entire Phanerozoic Eon, and has been described as ″one of the few ′living fossils′ that has survived all major catastrophic events in the Phanerozoic history of the Earth.″
