= Discina striata =

Scientific classification
- Domain: Eukaryota
- Kingdom: Animalia
- Phylum: Brachiopoda
- Order: Discinida
- Family: Discinidae
- Genus: Discina; Lamarck, 1819
- Species: D. striata

Binomial name
- Discina striata (Schumacher, 1817)

Genus of brachiopods

Discina is a monotypic genus of Discinidae brachiopods, comprising the species Discina striata.
