= Trematidae =

Trematidae Temporal range: 463.5–353.8 Ma Ordovician to Late Devonian

Scientific classification
- Domain: Eukaryota
- Kingdom: Animalia
- Phylum: Brachiopoda
- Order: Discinida
- Superfamily: Discinoidea
- Family: Trematidae

Genera
- †Drabodiscina; †Schizobolus; †Schizocrania; †Trematis

Extinct family of brachiopods

Trematidae is an extinct family in the brachiopod superfamily Discinoidea.
