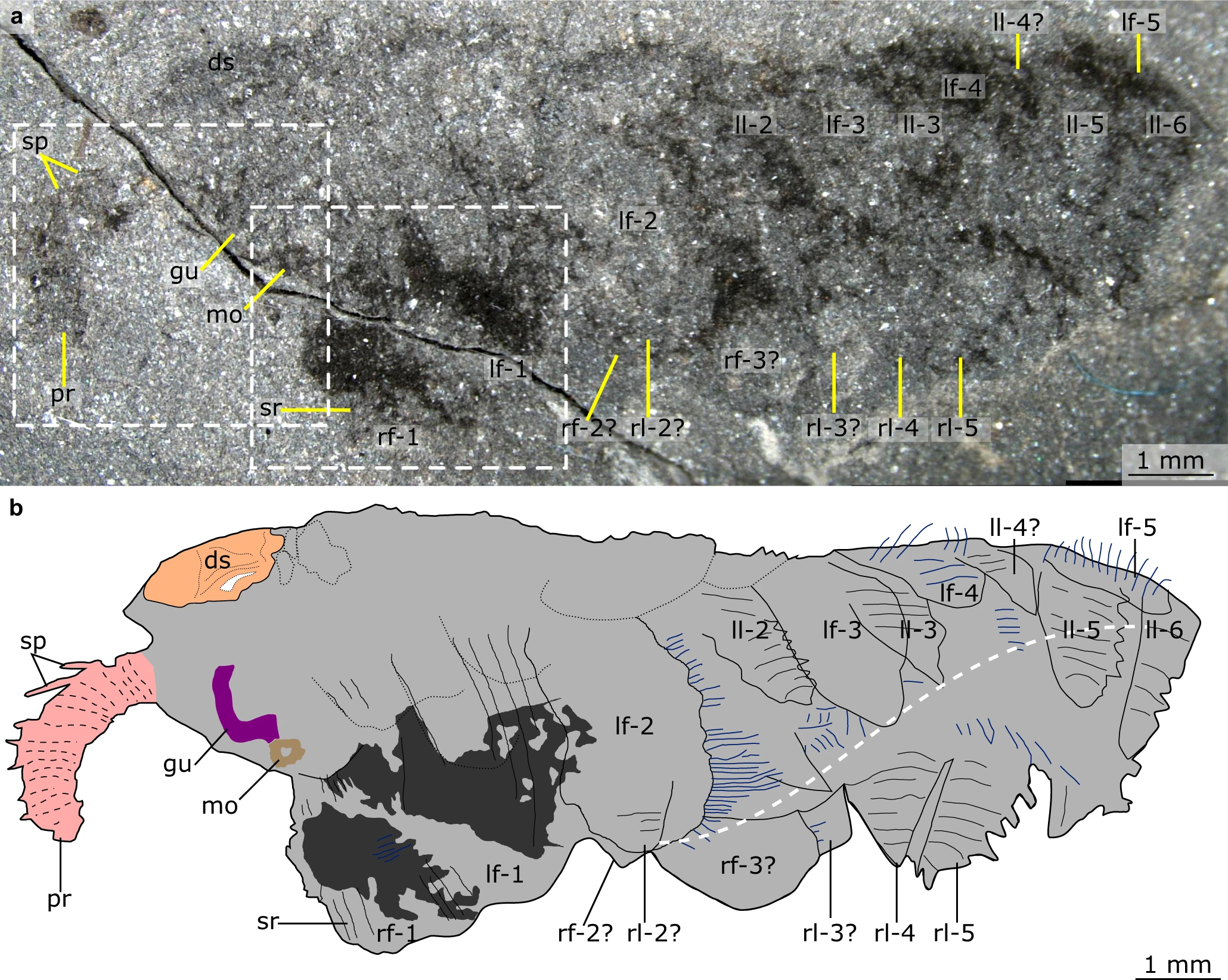
- Holotype specimen and interpreted drawing
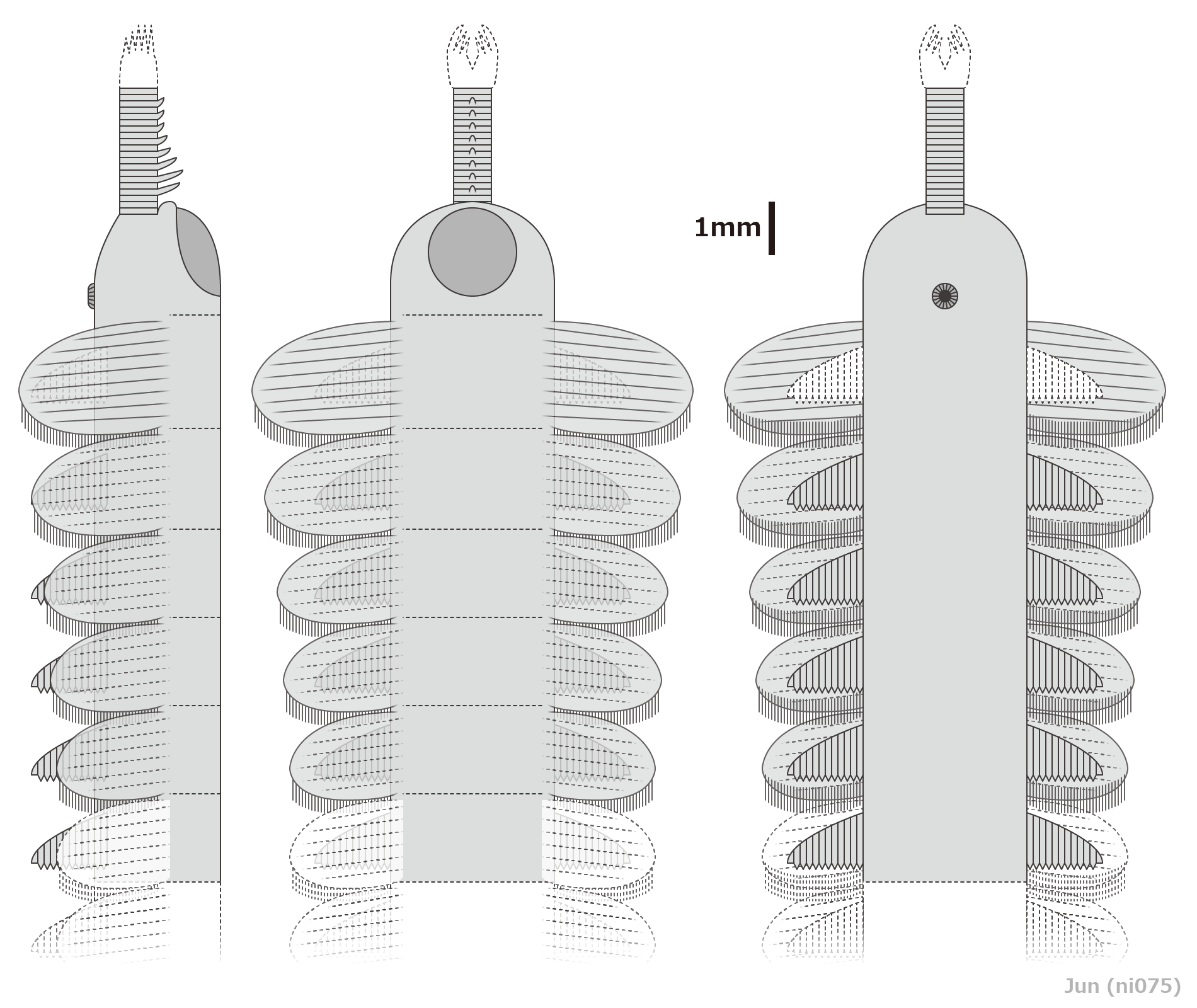
- Diagrammatic reconstruction

Scientific classification
- Kingdom: Animalia
- Stem group: Arthropoda
- Class: †Dinocaridida
- Order: †Opabiniida
- Family: †Opabiniidae
- Genus: †Mieridduryn; Pates et al, 2022

Type species
- Mieridduryn bonniae Pates et al, 2022

= Mieridduryn =

Mieridduryn Temporal range: Middle Ordovician ~462 Ma

Extinct genus of arthropod

Mieridduryn (MI-eri-thi-RYN) is a genus of dinocaridid (a group of extinct arthropods) that lived during the Middle Ordovician of what is now the United Kingdom. This animal was described in 2022 based on a single fossil found in Castle Bank, a Burgess shale-type lagerstätte located in the country of Wales. Mierridduryn's affinities (relation to other arthropods) are somewhat uncertain, with two possibilities currently being favored.

== Taxonomy and research history ==
The genus name is a composite of two Welsh words; mieri and duryn, which means "bramble snout". The species name bonniae is named after Bonnie Douel, the fossil site owners' niece; the family heavily supported the research on the site after the discovery of the biota.

The one specimen confirmed to be of this species, the holotype found in Castle Bank, was described in 2022. Initially, the focus of studies on this site was on the fossils of sponges, but later studies started to focus on the preserved arthropod fauna. The fossil was collected from a quarry on private land near Llandrindod Wells; the specific quarry is a part of the larger Gilwern Volcanic Formation, and the graptolites found dated the site to the Darriwilian of the Middle Ordovician.

This animal's taxonomic affinities are somewhat unclear, as the fossil shows a combination of traits associated with both opabiniids and radiodonts. The major opabiniid-like feature is the single central proboscis; radiodont-like features include the spines on the proboscis, possibly associated with sclerotization. If Mieridduryn is indeed an opabiniid, it would extend that family's known range by 40 million years, into the Ordovician. If in fact it is a radiodont, this would imply that an Opabinia-like proboscis is a basal trait of the larger arthopod clade which includes Opabinia, radiodonts, and all living arthropods, which was secondarily lost in the latter two groups

== Description ==
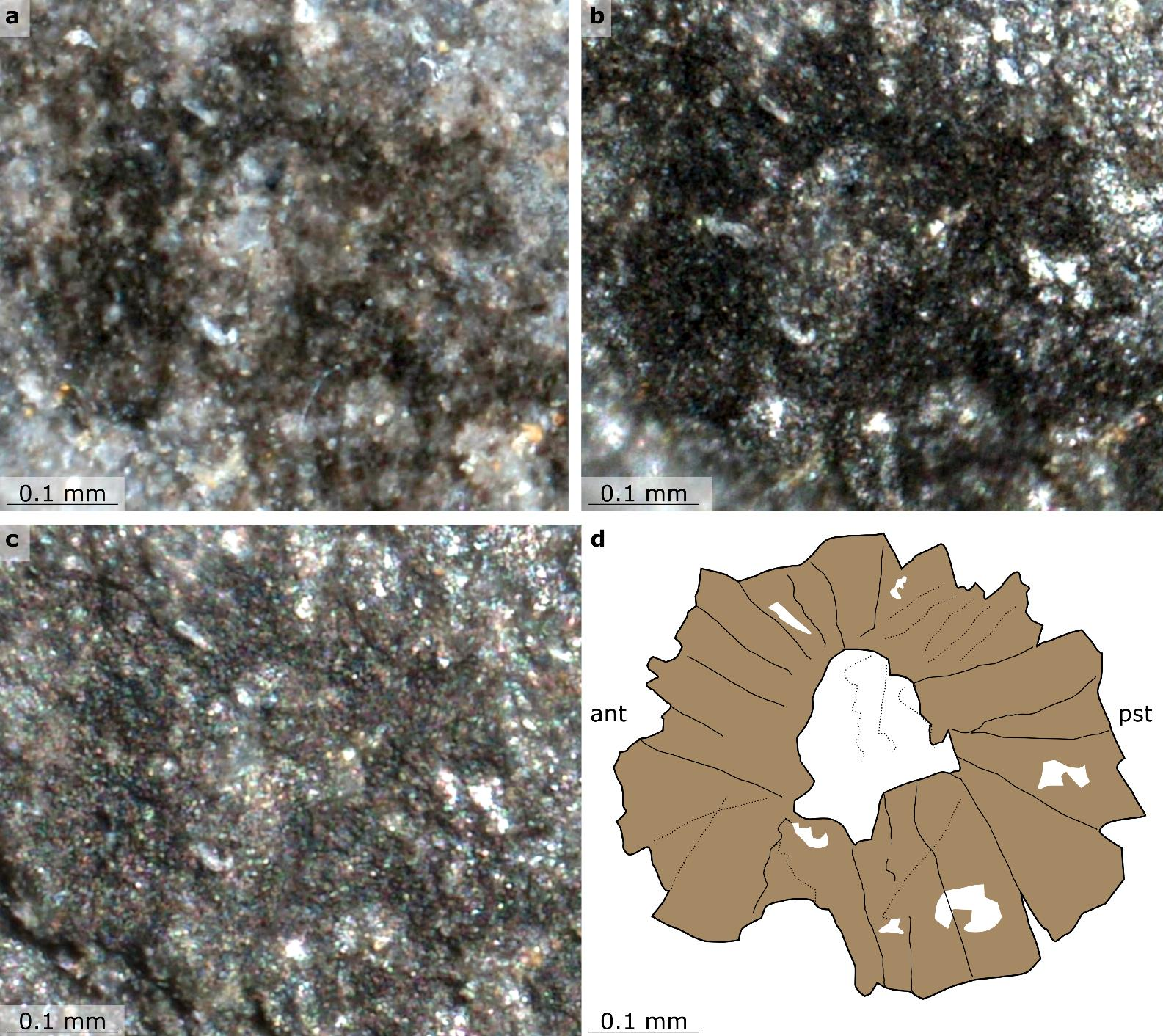
Oral cone

This animal shares many features that are characteristic of dinocaridids (including tetra-radial mouthparts, flapping trunk appendages, and lobopod-like legs). The specimen measures around 13 millimetres (0.51 in) in length along the dorsal margin of the fossil. The head of the creature bore a fused proboscis that had slender spines on the dorsal surface, and could have also possessed a claw-like appendage. On the top of the head was a circular-shaped dorsal sclerite (similar to the ones seen in radiodonts). The mouth of this animal, known as an oral cone, was 0.4 mm in length, and preserved several lightly sclerotized plates. The trunk region had two types of appendages, being lobopod-like limbs along with dorsolateral flaps, which are significant as they were thought to be exclusive to opabiniids and radiodonts, which helped support the naming of this creature as a new genus.

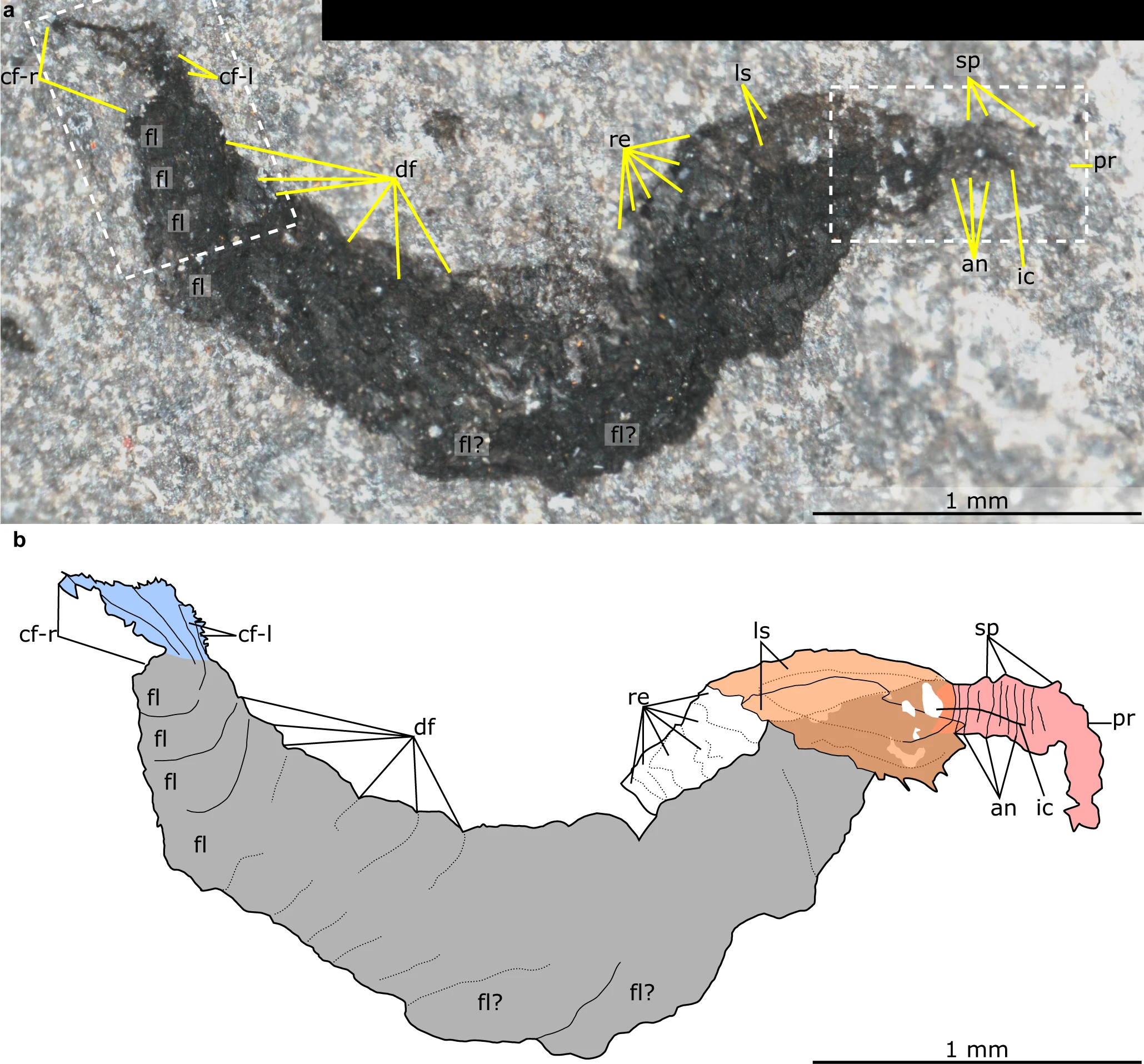

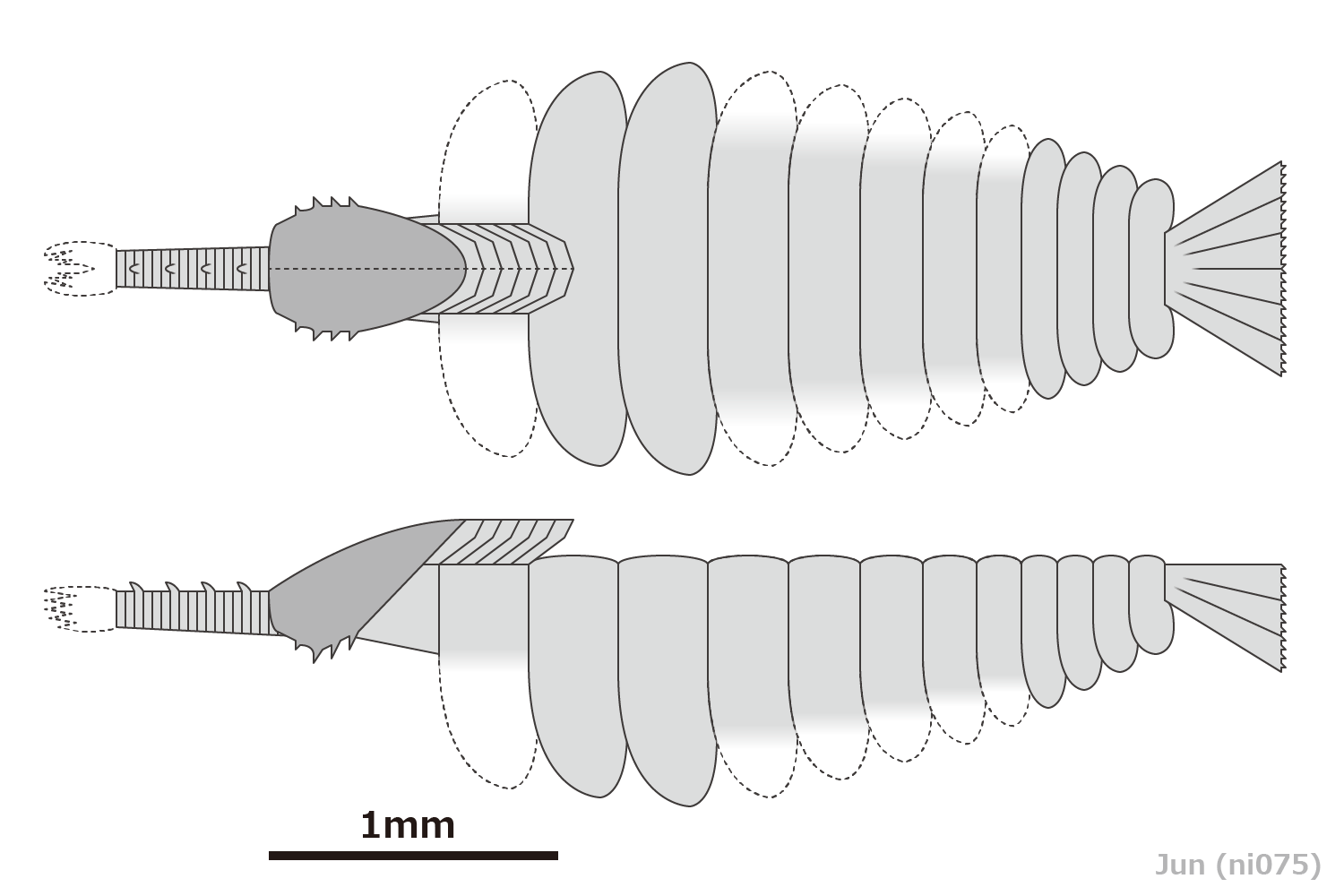
Interpretations of NMW.2021.3 G.8

Another fossil arthropod specimen known from Castle Bank (NMW.2021.3 G.8) resembles Mieridduryn and the opabiniids. This animal is far smaller than Mieridduryn, and has a slightly different anatomy. This animal was not named in the 2022 paper due to the enigmatic qualities of the specimen. It is thought that specimen may represent the larval stage of Mieridduryn due to the certain qualities that resemble the larval stage of other arthropods. It was also suggested, however that this specimen represents an entirely distinct genus and species due to its unique appearance.

=== Significance ===
Before this species' discovery, it was thought that hurdiid radiodonts (like Aegirocassis, Pseudoangustidontus and Schinderhannes) were the only dinocaridids that survived past the Cambrian. This creature's existence suggests that dinocaridids could have been more diverse and abundant in the post-Cambrian oceans than previously thought. If this creature proves to be an opabiniid, it would suggest that these creatures survived far longer into the middle Ordovician, and did not go extinct in the Cambrian.

== Classification ==
Two main classifications were done on this creature, and the two found different results. One study found that this animal forms a monophyletic group with radiodonts and the deuteropods. The other study instead found this animal to be a late-surviving opabiniid. The true classification of this animal, however, is still being debated, though this taxon does show that the opabiniid bauplan was around far longer than what was originally thought.

- Pambdelurion
- - Opabiniidae
  - - Mieridduryn
    - - Radiodonta
      - Deuteropoda

== Further Information ==
- Co-discoverer Joseph Botting discusses Mieridduryn
