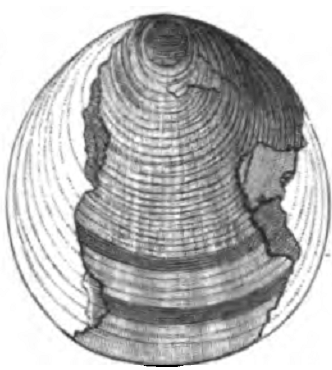
- Lingulella caelata

Scientific classification
- Domain: Eukaryota
- Kingdom: Animalia
- Phylum: Brachiopoda
- Class: Lingulata
- Order: Lingulida; Waagen, 1885

Superfamilies
- Linguloidea; †Obolidae; †Acrotheloidea; Discinoidea

= Lingulida =

Order of brachiopods

Lingulida is an order of brachiopods.

== Extinct species ==
The following are extinct species and genera belonging to the family Lingulidae.

- Lingularia Biernat & Emig, 1993
  - Lingularia ex gr. tenuissima (Bronn, 1837)
  - Lingularia similis Biernat & Emig, 1993
  - Lingularia siberica Biernat & Emig, 1993
  - Lingularia smirnovae Biernat & Emig, 1993
  - Lingularia michailovae Smirnova & Ushatinskaya, 2001
  - Lingularia sp. Hori & Campbell, 2004
  - Lingularia notialis Holmer & Bergston, 2009
  - Lingularia salymica Smirnova, 2015 in Smirnova & al. (2015)
  - ? Lingula mytilloides Sowerby, Lingula elliptica Phillips, and Lingula parallela Phillips
  - ? Lingula straeleni Demanet
  - ? Lingula lumsdeni Graham
  - ? Lingula squamiformis Phillips
  - ? Lingula aoraki Campbell, 1987
- Credolingula Smirnova & Ushatinskaya, 2001
  - Credolingula olferievi Smirnova & Ushatinskaya, 2001
  - Credolingula subtruncata Smirnova & Ushatinskaya, 2001
- Dignomia Hall, 1871
  - Dignomia munsterii (d'Orbigny, 1842)
  - ? Dignomia submarginata (d'Orbigny, 1850)
  - Dignomia alveata (Hall, 1863)
  - Dignomia lepta (Clarke, 1912)
  - ? Dignomia lineata (Steinman & Hoek, 1912)
- Sinolingularia Peng & Shi, 2008
  - Sinolingularia huananensis Peng & Shi, 2008
  - Sinolingularia yini Peng & Shi, 2008
  - Sinoglottidia Peng & Shi, 2008
  - Sinoglottidia archboldi Peng & Shi, 2008
- Argentiella Archbold, Cisterna & Sterren, 2005
  - Argentiella stappenbecki Archbold, Cisterna & Sterren, 2005
- Semilingula Egorov & Popov, 1990
  - Semilingula miloradovichi (Ifanova, 1972)
  - Semilingula taimyrensis (Einor)
- ? Apsilingula Williams, 1977
- ? Baroisella Hall & Clark 1892
