= Paleobiota of the Burgess Shale =

Fossil flora and fauna of the Burgess Shale

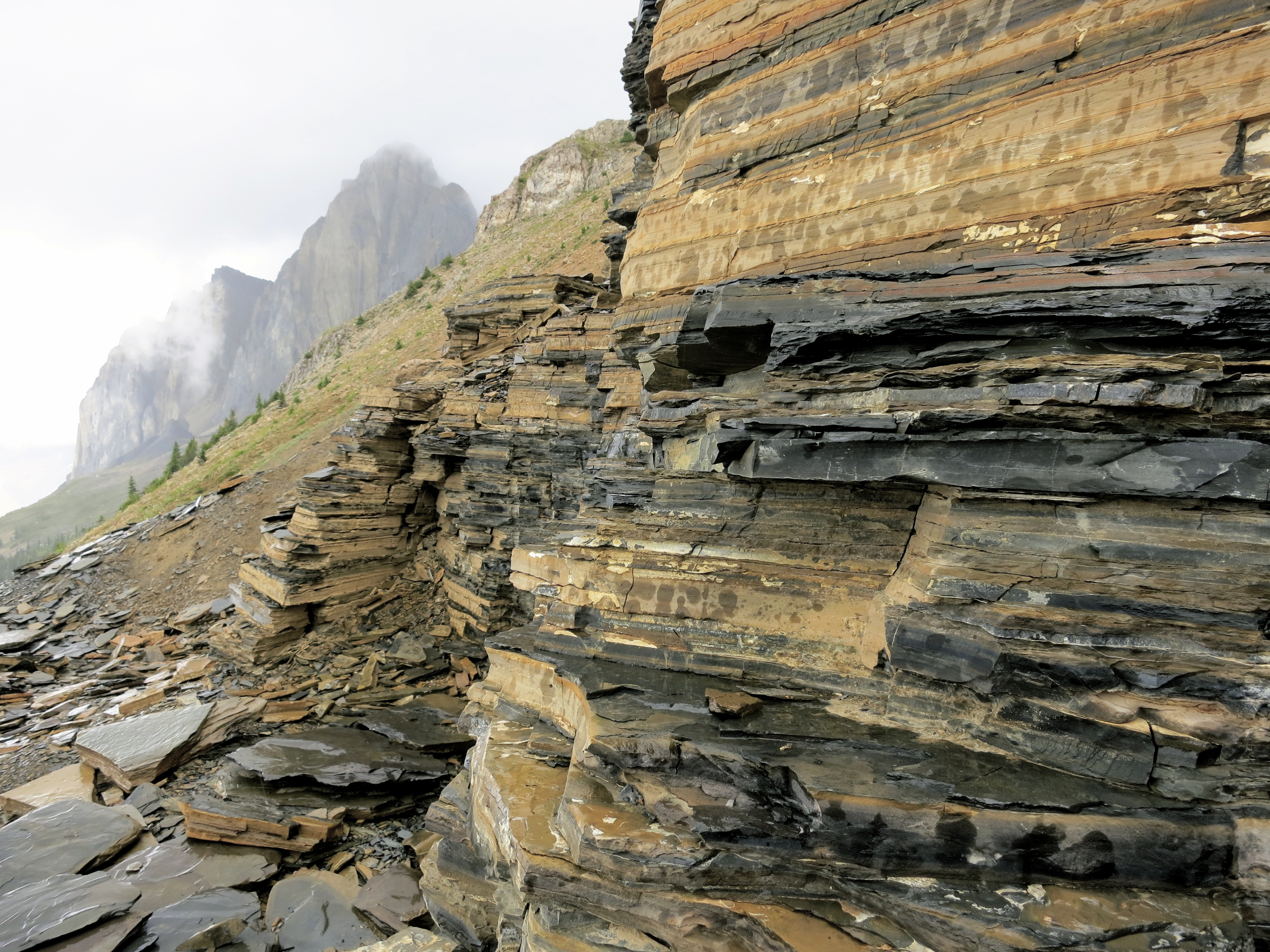
Outcrop of the Burgess Shale in Yoho National Park, Canada.

This is a list of the biota of the Burgess Shale, a Cambrian lagerstätte located in Yoho National Park in Canada.

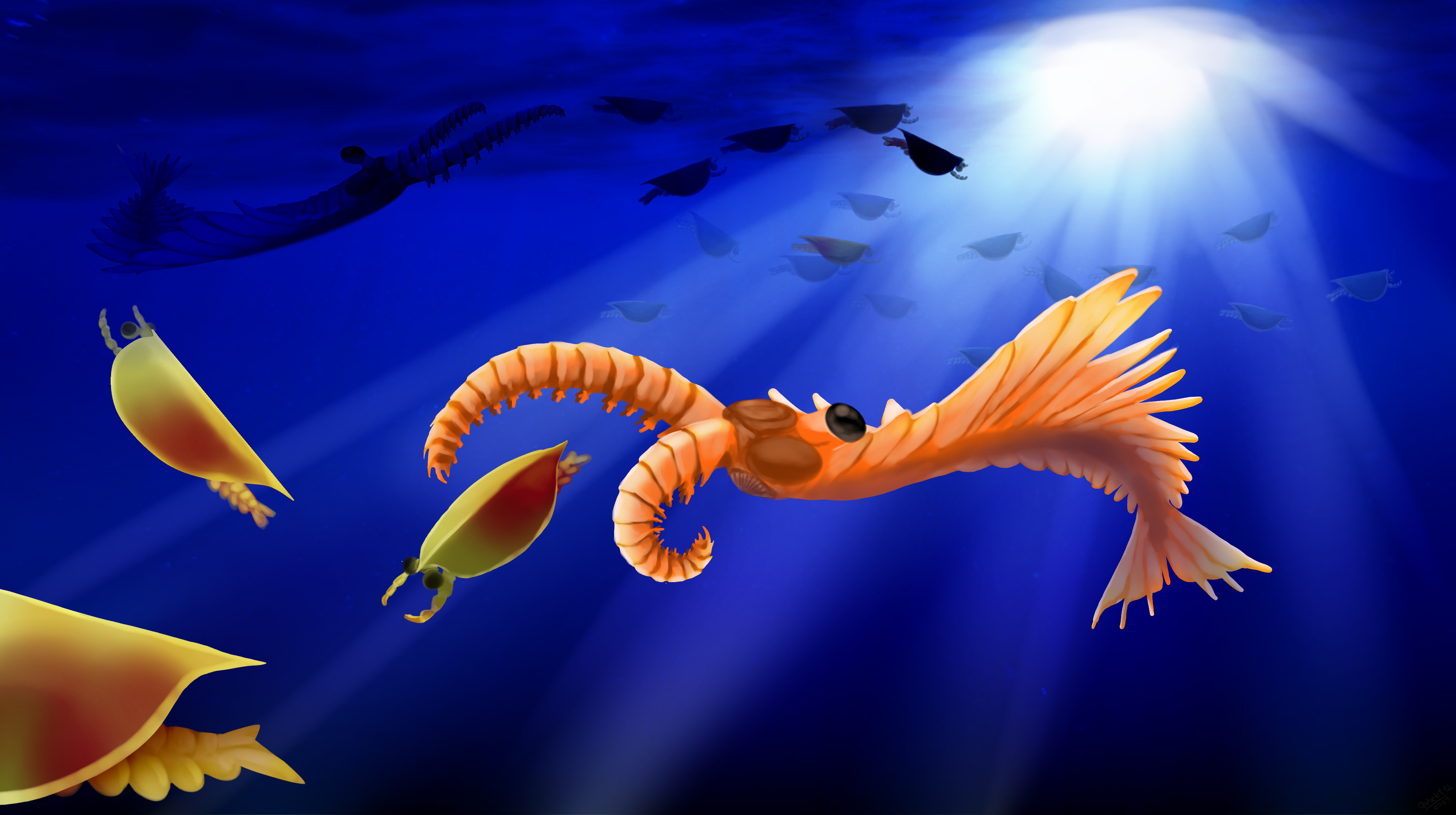
Restoration of the nektonic environment of the site, showing a pair of Anomalocaris canadensis hunting a school of Isoxys acutangulus.

The Burgess Shale is a fossil-bearing deposit exposed in the Canadian Rockies of British Columbia, Canada. It is famous for the exceptional preservation of the soft parts of its fossils. At 508 million years old (middle Cambrian), it is one of the earliest fossil beds containing soft-part imprints. During the Cambrian, the ecosystem of the Burgess Shale sat under 100 to 300 metres (330 to 1000 feet) of water at the base of a submarine canyon known as the Cathedral Escarpment, which today is a part of the Canadian Rockies. The ecosystem would have sat in dimly lit water, most likely at the edge, or in the Mesopelagic zone. The ecosystem was preserved by rapid mudslides that quickly buried organisms near, or on the seafloor, which helps explain the rarity of nektonic organisms at the site. The shale would have supported unique environments like brine pools that could have also helped to preserve the fossils. Notable areas that expose the Burgess Shale include the Walcott Quarry, Marble Canyon, Stephen Formation, Tulip Beds, Stanley Glacier, the Trilobite Beds and the Cathedral Formation. With each site occupying a varying depth, and distance from the base of the escarpments.

== Arthropoda ==
Crown-group arthropods (euarthropods such as trilobites) and their stem-group relatives (such as radiodonts) are extremely diverse and some species are abundant in the Burgess Shale. Along with their earlier-diverging cousins, the "Lobopodians", they provide great information on early Panarthropod evolution.

Arthropods
Genus	Phylum	Higher taxon	Locality of Origin	Notes	Images
Opabinia	Stem-group Arthropoda	Opabiniidae	Walcott Quarry; Raymond Quarry	An opabiniid stem-group arthropod. This animal had five stalked eyes, a set of swimming trunk appendages, and a proboscis tipped with a claw-like appendage.	
Anomalocaris	Stem-group Arthropoda	Radiodonta	Trilobite Beds; Tulip Beds; Walcott Quarry; Raymond Quarry; Collins Quarry; Stanley Glacier	The largest radiodont from the Burgess Shale, and the ecosystem’s apex predator. What it ate has been somewhat controversial due to the possible softness of its oral cone (mouthpart).	
Hurdia	Stem-group Arthropoda	Radiodonta	Marble Canyon; Walcott Quarry; Raymond Quarry; Collins Quarry; Tulip Beds; Stanley Glacier	A hurdiid radiodont that possessed a large frontal head sclerite. This animal is known from deposits in North America.	
Peytoia	Stem-group Arthropoda	Radiodonta	Walcott Quarry; Tulip Beds	A close relative of Hurdia that was originally named as a jellyfish, but was later recognized as the oral cone of the creature. This creature is also known from European deposits.	
Mosura	Stem-group Arthropoda	Radiodonta	Raymond Quarry; Marble Canyon; Tokumm Creek	A unique hurdiid known from around sixty specimens. Similarly to Stanleycaris, this taxon possesses a third median eye, and lacks P-elements. Also notable is its extreme tagmatization, and small size.	
Stanleycaris	Stem-group Arthropoda	Radiodonta	Stanley Glacier	A basal hurdiid radiodont known from a variety of Cambrian deposits in North America. Although looking more like anomalocaridid and amplectobeluid radiodonts, it has features that more closely align it with the hurdiids.	
Cambroraster	Stem-group Arthropoda	Radiodonta	Marble Canyon	A unique looking hurdiid that bore a distinct horseshoe shaped head sclerite. This radiodont was first described in 2019, and was named after the fictional Millennium Falcon, which its dorsal carapace resembles.	
Titanokorys	Stem-group Arthropoda	Radiodonta	Marble Canyon	The largest hurdiid from the shale, and one of the largest Cambrian animals (up to a foot long). This radiodont was originally thought to have been a giant specimen of Cambroraster until late 2021.	
Amplectobelua	Stem-group Arthropoda	Radiodonta	Tulip Beds	Radiodont distinguished by its claw-shaped frontal appendages, another species A. symbrachiata, is known from China	
Waptia	Arthropoda	Order Hymenocarina	Walcott Quarry; Raymond Quarry	A hymenocarine that possessed a shrimp-like body and is one of the earliest known examples of parental care in the fossil record.	
Canadaspis	Arthropoda	Order Hymenocarina	Walcott Quarry	A hymenocarine that is thought to have been benthic feeders that moved mainly by walking and possibly used its biramous appendages to stir mud in search of food. They have been placed within the Hymenocarina, which includes other bivalved Cambrian arthropods.	
Fibulacaris	Arthropoda	Order Hymenocarina	Marble Canyon	A small, odarid hymenocarine that most likely swam in an inverted position in the water column. It most likely lived as a nektonic suspension feeder.	
Balhuticaris	Arthropoda	Order Hymenocarina	Marble Canyon	A large hymenocarine arthropod that most likely lived a mainly nektonic lifestyle. This creature had about 110 pairs of biramous limbs, the most of any Cambrian aged arthropod.	
Loricicaris	Arthropoda	Order Hymenocarina	Collins Quarry	A hymenocarine with an elongated, spined abdomen. It was found in the Kicking Horse Shale Member of the shale	
Odaraia	Arthropoda	Order Hymenocarina	Walcott Quarry; Raymond Quarry	A hymenocarine arthropod that bore a large pair of eyes at the front of its body, and may have had two smaller eyes in between. It had a tubular body with at least 45 pairs of biramous limbs, and its tail had three fins – two horizontal, one vertical – which were used to stabilise the animal as it swam on its back.	framess
Pakucaris	Arthropoda	Order Hymenocarina	Marble Canyon	A hymenocarine that ranged in length from 11.65 to 26.6 millimetres (0.459 to 1.047 in). The main bivalved carapace covers around 80% of the body, with the pygidium covering the remaining 20%.	
Perspicaris	Arthropoda	Order Hymenocarina	Marble Canyon; Walcott Quarry; Tulip Beds; Trilobite Beds	Two named species are known from the Burgess Shale; Perspicaris dictynna and Perspicaris recondita, which differ in maximum size (66 millimetres (2.6 in) in P. recondita vs 29 millimetres (1.1 in) in P. dictynna), as well as proportions of the tail.	
Nereocaris	Arthropoda	Order Hymenocarina	Tulip Beds; Collins Quarry	A large hymenocarine. This genus, including both species, is diagnosed by the presence of two lateral stalked eyes and one median eye, the possession of a laterally compressed bivalved carapace with hook-like elements, and a telson with a triangular medial process and a three-segmented elongate lateral process.	
Tokummia	Arthropoda	Order Hymenocarina	Marble Canyon	A hymenocarine known from the Marble canyon deposits that was one of the first animals that evolved claws. The genus name Tokummia named after Tokumm Creek which runs through the Marble Canyon. The species name katalepsis means Greek word for "seizing", "gasping" or "holding".	
Branchiocaris	Arthropoda	Order Hymenocarina	Marble Canyon; Walcott Quarry; Raymond Quarry; Collins Quarry; Tulip Beds	A hymenocarine that had a pair of short segmented tapered antennules with at least 20 segments, as well as a pair of claw appendages. It was likely an active swimmer, and used the claw appendages to bring food to the mouth.	
Plenocaris	Arthropoda	Order Hymenocarina	Walcott Quarry; Raymond Quarry; Colins Quarry	This hymenocarine was originally described as a species of Yohoia by Walcott in 1912, but was placed into its own genus in 1974.	
Tuzoia	Arthropoda	Order Hymenocarina	Marble Canyon; Walcott Quarry; Raymond Quarry; Collins Quarry; Tulip Beds	A genus of large hymenocarine known from Early to Middle Cambrian marine environments from what is now North America, Australia, China, Europe and Siberia. The large, domed carapace reached lengths of 180 millimetres (7.1 in), making them amongst the largest known Cambrian arthropods.	
Burgessia	Arthropoda	Unassigned	Walcott Quarry	Along with an uncertain placement in the arthropod family tree, Burgessia had a delicate structure below its round carapace. The largest individuals were only a little over four centimetres in length, and the smallest about half a centimetre from the front of the carapace to the tip of the rear spine.	
Carnarvonia	Arthropoda	Unassigned	Raymond Quarry	An arthropod of uncertain placement. Only known from a single bivalved carapace that bears veins.	
Worthenella	Arthropoda	Family Kootenichelidae	Walcott Quarry	An elongate arthropod of uncertain affinities, only known from a single specimen with 44 body segments with limbs.	
Kootenichela	Arthropoda	Family Kootenichelidae	Stanley Glacier	Kootenichela has appendages bound to the trunk are poorly sclerotised. It was approximately 4 centimetres (1.6 in) long. Most prominent are the claw-like, spinose cephalic appendages, which seem to suggest affinities with Megacheira, the "great appendage" arthropods. However, study in 2015 researchers could not confirm neither the head configuration nor the megacheiran interpretation of the anatomy. Kootenichela has been subsequently suggested to be a chimera of various arthropods such as a bivalved arthropod.	
Liangshanella	Arthropoda	Bradoriida	Marble Canyon; Walcott Quarry; Raymond Quarry	A bradoriid arthropod. 6263 specimens of Liangshanella are known from the Greater Phyllopod bed, where they are 11.9% of the community.	
Marrella	Arthropoda	Marrellomorpha	Marble Canyon; Walcott Quarry; Raymond Quarry; Tulip Beds	The most common organism of the Burgess Shale fauna. It was initially called the "Lace Crab" by Walcott, and was described more formally as an odd trilobite. In 1971, Whittington undertook a thorough redescription of the animal and, on the basis of its legs, gills and head appendages, concluded that it was neither a trilobite, nor a chelicerate, nor a crustacean. It carried a shield extending from its head over its gills. The brush-like appendages of its head probably swept food into its mouth. It is likely to have been an active swimmer with its swimming appendages used in a backstroke motion, with the large spines acting as stabilizers.	
Skania	Arthropoda	Marrellomorpha?	Walcott Quarry; Raymond Quarry	A somewhat enigmatic arthropod that has been speculated to have belonged to the Marrellomorpha.	
Primicaris	Arthropoda	Marrellomorpha?	Marble Canyon	An arthropod originally thought to have been a nektaspid, but is now considered a possible marrellomorph.	
Emeraldella	Arthropoda	(unranked) Artiopoda	Walcott Quarry	A vicissicaudatan arthropod that was aligned close to the trilobites. This creature had caudal flaps that are present on the terminal tergite, alongside an elongated spine.	
Sidneyia	Arthropoda	(unranked) Artiopoda	Walcott Quarry; Raymond Quarry; Collins Quarry; Tulip Beds; Stanley Glacier	Sidneyia was a large 13 centimeter (5.1 in) long predatory artiopod that most likely was a durophagous predator, due to young trilobites, hyoliths, and brachiopods being commonly found as stomach contents. Other species are known from earlier deposits in China.	
Tegopelte	Arthropoda	(unranked) Artiopoda	Walcott Quarry	A species of large (up to 28 centimetres (11 in) long) soft-bodied arthropod known from two specimens from the Burgess Shale. Trackways that may have been produced by this organism or a close relative are known from the Kicking Horse Shale, stratigraphically below its body fossil occurrences. It is currently classified as a concilitergan arthropod within the Artiopoda.	
Helmetia	Arthropoda	(unranked) Artiopoda	Walcott Quarry; Raymond Quarry	Another concilitergan arthropod. Fossils are both rare and poorly known; the genus was described by Walcott in 1918 and has not been reexamined, though it was briefly reviewed in the 1990s and has been included in a number of cladistic analyses. It has been lumped with the arachnomorphs. One analysis has resolved the Helmetiiida as a robust clade and the closest relatives of trilobites.	
Molaria	Arthropoda	(unranked) Artiopoda	Marble Canyon; Walcott Quarry; Raymond Quarry	An artiopodan arthropod of uncertain affinity. The body of Molaria consisted of a head shield (cephalon), a trunk consisting of eight sections (tergites), and a telson, which included a short ventral spine and a long posterior spine.	
Naraoia	Arthropoda	(unranked) Artiopoda	Marble Canyon; Walcott Quarry; Raymond Quarry; Trilobite Beds; Tulip Beds; Collins Quarry	A nektaspid arthropod that belonged to the family Naraoiidae, that lived from the early Cambrian to the late Silurian period. The species are characterized by a large alimentary system and sideways oriented antennas. It reached small to average sizes (about 2-4.5 cm long).	
Hanburia	Arthropoda	(unranked) Artiopoda	Walcott Quarry; Tulip Beds	A trilobite possibly belonging to the family Dolichometopidae.	
Bathyuriscus	Arthropoda	(unranked) Artiopoda	Trilobite Beds; Tulip Beds; Areas of Fossil Ridge	A member of the Dolichometopidae family, this trilobite was a nekto-benthic predator, and is an important stratigraphic marker for the larger Campsite Cliff Shale Member on Mount Stephen. Its major characteristics are a large forward-reaching glabella, pointed pleurae or pleurae with very short spines, and a medium pygidium with well-impressed furrows.	
Kootenia	Arthropoda	(unranked) Artiopoda	Marble Canyon; Walcott Quarry; Trilobite Beds	A trilobite belonging to the family Dorypygidae. Its major characteristics are that of the closely related Olenoides, including medium size, a large glabella, and a medium-sized pygidium, but also a lack of the strong interpleural furrows on the pygidium that Olenoides has.	
Ogygopsis	Arthropoda	(unranked) Artiopoda	Trilobite Beds	A trilobite belonging to the family Dorypygidae. It is the most common fossil in the Mt. Stephen fossil beds there, but rare in other Cambrian faunas. Its major characteristics are a prominent glabella with eye ridges, lack of pleural spines, a large spineless pygidium about as long as the thorax or cephalon.	Reconstruction of Ogygopsis klotzi in the Burgess Shale
Olenoides	Arthropoda	(unranked) Artiopoda	Walcott Quarry; Trilobite Beds; Tulip Beds	Olenoides is an average size trilobite (up to 9 cm long), broadly oval in outline. Its cephalon is semi-circular. The glabella is parallel-sided, rounded at its front and almost reaches the anterior border. Narrow occular ridges curve backwards from the front of the glabella to the small, outwardly-bowed eyes. The librigenae narrow backward into straight, slender genal spines that reach as far as the third thorax segment. Thorax consists of seven segments that end in needle-like spines.	
Oryctocephalus	Arthropoda	(unranked) Artiopoda	Walcott Quarry; Trilobite Beds	A trilobite belonging to the family Oryctocephalidae. This small- to medium-sized trilobite's major characteristics are prominent eye ridges, pleural spines, long genal spines, spines on the pygidium, and notably four furrows connecting pairs of pits on its glabella. Juvenile specimens have been found with only 5 or 6 thoracic segments and about one eighth of adult size, as well as about 2 mm wide.	
Parkaspis	Arthropoda	(unranked) Artiopoda		A trilobite belonging to the family Zacanthoididae.	
Zacanthoides	Arthropoda	(unranked) Artiopoda	Marble Canyon; Trilobite Beds	A trilobite belonging to the family Zacanthoididae. It was a nektobenthic predatory carnivore. Its major characteristics are a slender exoskeleton with 9 thoracic segments, pleurae with long spines, additional spines on the axial rings, and a pygidium that is considerably smaller than its cephalon.	
Ptychagnostus	Arthropoda	(unranked) Artiopoda	Marble Canyon; Walcott Quarry	Several agnostid artiopods (usually considered trilobites).	
Peronopsis	Arthropoda	(unranked) Artiopoda	Marble Canyon; Areas of Mount Stephen and Odaray	Several agnostid artiopods (usually considered trilobites).	
Pagetia	Arthropoda	(unranked) Artiopoda	Walcott Quarry; Raymond Quarry; Trilobite Beds	Several agnostid artiopods (usually considered trilobites).	
Chancia	Arthropoda	(unranked) Artiopoda	Walcott Quarry; Raymond Quarry; Trilobite Beds	A trilobite belonging to the family Alokistocaridae. Chancia was a particle feeder. Its major characteristics are a normal glabella but an enlarged cephalon due to a pre-glabellar field in front of the glabella, as well as developed eye ridges, medium-sized genal spines, and an extremely small pygidium.	
Ehmaniella	Arthropoda	(unranked) Artiopoda	Marble Canyon; Walcott Quarry; Raymond Quarry; Collins Quarry; Trilobite Beds	A trilobite. Ehmaniellas major characteristics are a wide cranidium, heavy eye ridges, longitudinal striae on the pre-glabellar area, and a small pygidium with few segments.	
Elrathia	Arthropoda	(unranked) Artiopoda	Walcott Quarry	A genus of trilobite belonging to Ptychopariacea. E. kingii is one of the most common trilobite fossils in the USA. It is locally found in extremely high concentrations within the Wheeler Formation in the U.S. state of Utah. E. kingii has been considered the most recognizable trilobite. Commercial quarries extract E. kingii in prolific numbers, with just one commercial collector estimating 1.5 million specimens extracted in a 20-year career.	
Elrathina	Arthropoda	(unranked) Artiopoda	Marble Canyon; Walcott Quarry; Trilobite Beds; Tulip Beds	A genus of trilobite belonging to Ptychopariacea.	
Spencella	Arthropoda	(unranked) Artiopoda		A trilobite belonging to the family Ptychopariidae.	
Habelia	Arthropoda	Chelicerata	Walcott Quarry; Raymond Quarry; Tulip Beds?	While previously enigmatic, a 2017 redescription found that Habelia formed a clade (Habeliida) with Sanctacaris, Utahcaris, Wisangocaris and Messorocaris as a stem-group to Chelicerata. Habelia is thought to have been durophagous, feeding on hard shelled organisms.	
Sanctacaris	Arthropoda	Chelicerata	Collins Quarry	A member of the clade Habeliida, related to chelicerates. Sanctacaris was only first described in 1981. It possessed a large flat tail, suggesting it was a good swimmer, a group of six appendages in each side of its body, and a very streamlined head.	
Mollisonia	Arthropoda	Chelicerata	Marble Canyon; Walcott Quarry; Stanley Glacier; Trilobite Beds	An extinct genus of Cambrian arthropod. An observation published in 2019 suggests this genus is a basal chelicerate, closer to crown group Chelicerata than members of Habeliida.	
Thelxiope	Arthropoda	stem-groupChelicerate	Walcott Quarry	A relative of Mollisonia that possessed a long spine that protruded out of its posterior.	
Leanchoilia	Arthropoda	Megacheira	Walcott Quarry; Raymond Quarry; Tulip Beds	A megacheiran arthropod. Leanchoilia is distinguished from other arthropods by its arms. They split into three appendages, probably to find food, as they lack the spiny characteristic of predators.	
Yohoia	Arthropoda	Megacheira	Walcott Quarry; Raymond Quarry; Collins Quarry	Yohoia was a streamlined megacheiran that had around 20 segments. It has been compared to modern mantis shrimp, where It had two four-fingered hands, and may have preyed on trilobites, smashing or spearing them with its fingers.	
Actaeus	Arthropoda	Megacheira	Walcott Quarry	A megacheiran arthropod containing the single species Actaeus armatus. It is known from a single specimen recovered from the Burgess Shale, and it may be poorly preserved specimen of Alalcomenaeus. The specimen is over 6 cm long and has a body consisting of a head shield, 11 body tergites, and a terminal plate.	
Alalcomenaeus	Arthropoda	Megacheira	Marble Canyon; Walcott Quarry; Raymond Quarry; Collins Quarry	One of the most widespread and longest-surviving arthropod genera of the Early and Middle Cambrian. Its large eyes and the long flagella on its great appendages, combined with its large feeding apparatus and the spines on its inner limb branches, are more consistent with a predatory lifestyle, and the most recent interpretation has it feeding on organisms that lived on or in the surface of the sea floor.	
Yawunik	Arthropoda	Megacheira	Marble Canyon	Yawunik is named after a primordial sea monster in Ktunaxa mythology. Compared to Leanchoilia it bore teeth on great appendages, suggesting an enhanced ability to grasp prey.	
Isoxys	Arthropoda	Family Isoxyidae	Walcott Quarry; Raymond Quarry; Collins Quarry; Tulip Beds; Trilobite Beds; Stanley Glacier	A basal bivalved arthropod, member of the family Isoxyidae. It had a pair of large spherical eyes (which are the most commonly preserved feature of the soft-bodied anatomy), and two large appendages It is possible that these appendages are homologous to the great appendages of radiodonts and megacheirans.	
Surusicaris	Arthropoda	Family Isoxyidae	Marble Canyon	A close relative of Isoxys from the Burgess shale. The only known specimen (ROM 62976), has a roughly semicircular bivalved carapace, which is approximately 1.49 centimetres (0.59 in) long and 0.89 centimetres (0.35 in) tall. The head has a pair of rounded eyes, and a pair of upward-curling segmented frontal appendages with at least five segments, the second, third and fourth of which bear a spine, with three long spines and at least one short spine on the fifth and terminal segment. It alongside Isoxys are considered basal stem-group arthropods.	
Sarotrocercus	Arthropoda	Not applicable	Walcott Quarry	An arthropod of uncertain affinities. In the original description, Sarotrocercus had been interpreted as a pelagic, nektonic animal that swam freely on its back, moving perhaps through movements of the trunk appendages and the action of its long tail tuft. However, based on the redescription by Haug et al. 2011, Sarotrocercus may had been benthic or at least swimming close to the seafloor, as the robust head appendages rather suggest a grasping or raking function.	
Caryosyntrips	Stem-group Arthropoda	Not applicable	Walcott Quarry; Raymond Quarry; Tulip Beds	An enigmatic panarthropod that was characterized by their forward facing grasping appendages. Originally classified as a problematic radiodont. Its name literally translates to "nutcracker".	

== Lobopodians ==
Lobopodians, a paraphyletic grade of worm-like panarthropods from which arthropods arose, were present in the shale, though they’re a rare faunal component compared to other groups.

Lobopodians
Genus		Higher Taxa	Locality of Origin	Notes	Images
Hallucigenia	Panarthropoda	Hallucigeniidae	Walcott Quarry; Raymond Quarry; Tulip Beds	A spined lobopodian. This creature is one of the more iconic taxa from the shale. The generic name reflects the type species' unusual appearance and eccentric history of study; when it was erected as a genus, H. sparsa was reconstructed as an enigmatic animal upside down and back to front. Hallucigenia was later recognized as a lobopodian, a grade of Paleozoic panarthropods from which the velvet worms, water bears, and arthropods arose.	
Entothyreos	Panarthropoda	Luolishaniidae	Tulip Beds	A unique spined Lobopodian mainly known from the tulip beds site of the shale. This recently described panarthropod was a suspension feeder like most of the other members of its family. It is unique for possessing a large amount of sclerotization compared to other lobopodians, comparable to that of true arthropods.	
Aysheaia	Panarthropoda	Aysheaiidae	Walcott Quarry	Aysheaia has ten body segments, each of which has a pair of spiked, annulate legs. The animal is segmented, and looks somewhat like a bloated caterpillar with a few spines added on — including six finger-like projections around the mouth and two grasping legs on the "head". Each leg has a subterminal row of about six curved claws. No jaw apparatus is evident. A pair of legs marks the posterior end of the body, unlike in onychophorans where the anus projects posteriad; this may be an adaptation to the terrestrial habit.	
Ovatiovermis	Panarthropoda	Luolishaniidae	Walcott Quarry	A suspension-feeding lobopodian. Ovatiovermis had nine pairs of lobopods. The first two pairs were elongate and had approximately 20 pairs of spines on each lobopod, with a bifid claw at each tip. The third to sixth pairs of lobopods were shorter and their paired spines were much smaller. On these four pairs of lobopods the spines were only large near the tip. The last three pairs of lobopods did not have the paired spines, showing that these spines were used for filter-feeding.	Animation of O. cribratus showing its purported anchored position and frontal lobopods for suspension feeding
Collinsovermis	Panarthropoda	Luolishaniidae	Areas of Mount Stephen	A heavily armored luolishaniid Lobopodian, and was probably a suspension feeder. It was originally nicknamed the "Collins Monster". It was a tiny worm-like soft bodied animal measuring about 3 cm long with multiple pairs of legs called lobopods. It bears 14 pairs of lobopods, which are closely attached to the main body unlike in other lobopodians. The anterior six pairs are unusual in that they are much longer than the posterior pairs or typical lobopod.	

== Sponges ==
Sponges (Porifera) were extremely diverse in the shale, with many of them belonging to the class Demospongiae.

Porifera
Genus	Class	Locality of Origin	Notes	Images
Capsospongia	Demospongiae	Walcott Quarry	A middle Cambrian sponge genus known from 3 specimens in the Burgess shale. It has a narrow base, and consists of bulging rings which get wider further up the sponge, resulting in a conical shape. Its open top was presumably used to expel water that had passed through the sponge cells and been filtered for nutrients.	
Choia	Demospongiae	Walcott Quarry; Raymond Quarry; Collins Quarry; Trilobite Beds; Tulip Beds	A genus of demosponge ranging from the Cambrian until the Lower Ordovician periods. Fossils of Choia have been found in the Burgess Shale in British Columbia; the Maotianshan shales of China; the Wheeler Shale in Utah; and the Lower Ordovician Fezouata formation. It was first described in 1920 by Charles Doolittle Walcott.	
Crumillospongia	Demospongiae	Walcott Quarry	A genus of middle Cambrian sponges known from the Burgess Shale and other localities from the Lower and Middle Cambrian. Its name is derived from the Latin crumilla ("money purse") and spongia ("sponge"), a reflection of its similarity to a small leathery money purse.	
Diagoniella	Hexactinellida	Walcott Quarry; Trilobite Beds; Tulip Beds; Stanley Glacier	A genus of sponge known from the Burgess Shale. This sponge formed a conical shape, with a diagonally arranged skeleton.	
Eiffelia	Stem-group Hexactinellida	Walcott Quarry; Trilobite Beds; Tulip Beds	A genus of sponges known from the Burgess Shale as well as several Early Cambrian small shelly fossil deposits. It is named after Eiffel Peak, which was itself named after the Eiffel Tower. It was first described in 1920 by Charles Doolittle Walcott. It belongs in the Hexactinellid stem group. Eiffelia generally have star-shaped six-rayed spicules, with rays diverging at 60°, occasionally with a seventh ray perpendicular to the other six.	
Eiffelospongia	Stem-group Hexactinellida	Trilobite Beds	A genus of sponge known from the Mount Stephen Trilobite Beds. It had a small ovoid shape, with a hairy-like root tuft.	
Falospongia	Demospongiae	Walcott Quarry	A genus of sponge made up of radiating fronds, known from the Burgess Shale. Irived from the Latin fala ("scaffold") and spongia ("sponge"), referring to the open framework of the skeleton. It superficially resembles Haplistion but is monaxial.	
Fieldospongia	Demospongiae	Monarch Peak; Parts of Mount Stephen	A genus of demosponge. Described in 1920 as Tuponia bellilineata by Walcott in his monograph on sponges from the Burgess Shale. The only known specimen purportedly came from the Mount Whyte Formation.	
Halichondrites	Demospongiae	Walcott Quarry; Raymond Quarry	A genus of sea sponge. It had an elongated, cone-like structure, with long spicules.	
Hamptonia	Demospongiae	Walcott Quarry; Tulip Beds; Trilobite Beds	A genus of sea sponge. It is known from the Middle Cambrian Burgess Shale and the Lower Ordovician Fezouata formation. It was first described in 1920 by Charles Walcott.	
Hamptoniella	Demospongiae	Trilobite Beds	A three dimensional sponge that was filled with many canals.	
Hazelia	Demospongiae	Walcott Quarry; Raymond Quarry; Collins Quarry; Trilobite Beds; Tulip Beds	A genus of spicular demosponge known from the Burgess Shale, the Marjum formation of Utah, and possibly Chengjiang. It was described by Charles Walcott in 1920. Its tracts are mainly radial and anastomose to form an irregular skeleton. Its oxeas form a fine net in the skin of the sponge. It is one of the more common sponges of the shale.	
Leptomitella	Demospongiae	Tulip Beds	A genus of demosponge.	
Leptomitus	Demospongiae	Walcott Quarry; Collins Quarry; Tulip Beds	A genus of demosponge known from the Burgess Shale. The tallest sponge of the Burgess Shale, Its name is derived from the Greek lept ("slender") and mitos ("thread"), referring to the overall shape of the sponge.	
Petaloptyon	Hexactinellida	Walcott Quarry; Trilobite Beds; Tulip Beds	A goblet-shaped hexactinellid sponge known from rare fragments from the Burgess Shale. The fragments show the living animal had a stalk, and had panels with a lattice pattern.	
Pirania	Demospongiae	Walcott Quarry; Trilobite Beds; Tulip Beds	A genus of cactus-like sea sponge known from the Burgess Shale and the Fezouata formation. It is named after Mount St. Piran, a mountain situated in the Bow River Valley in Banff National Park, Alberta. It was first described in 1920 by Charles Walcott.	
Protoprisma	Hexactinellida	Tulip Beds; Raymond Quarry	This creature was a glass sponge that had long, prismatic branches.	
Protospongia	Hexactinellida	Walcott Quarry	A genus of hexactinellid sponge. Many other sponges from Ordovician and Devonian deposits are placed in this genus due to the architecture of their spicules resembling that of Protospongia.	
Stephenospongia	Hexactinellida	Trilobite Beds	A genus of sponge known from a single specimen in the Trilobite beds of the Burgess Shale. Its body had numerous conspicuous holes.	
Takakkawia	Demospongiae	Walcott Quarry; Raymond Quarry; Tulip Beds	A genus of sponge in the order Protomonaxonida and the family Takakkawiidae. It reached around 4 cm in height, and its structure consisted of four columns of multi-rayed, organic spicules (perhaps originally calcareous or siliceous) that align to form flanges. The spicules form blade-like structures, ornamented with concentric rings. It was named after Takakkaw Falls, which marks the start of the trail to Fossil Ridge.	
Ulospongiella	Demospongiae	Trilobite Beds	A genus of sponge known only from the Burgess Shale deposit. It contains only one species, Ulospongiella ancyla. The generic name is derived from the Greek words oulus ("wooly" or "curly") and spongia ("sponge"), referring to the curled or curved spicules forming the skeleton. The specific name, ancyla, is from the Greek ankylos ("bent" or "hooked"), also referring to the curved spicules.	
Vauxia	Demospongiae	Walcott Quarry; Raymond Quarry; Collins Quarry; Trilobite Beds; Tulip Beds	A genus of demosponge that had a distinctive branching mode of growth. Vauxia had a skeleton of spongin (flexible organic material) common to modern day sponges. Much like Choia and other sponges, Vauxia fed by extracting nutrients from the water. Vauxia is named after Mount Vaux, a mountain in Yoho National Park.	
Wapkia	Demospongiae	Walcott Quarry; Tulip Beds	A genus of sea sponge with radial sclerites, known from the Burgess Shale. It was first described in 1920 by Charles Walcott.	

== Comb-jellies (Ctenophora) ==
Crown-group and stem-group Ctenophores, also known as comb jellies, are moderately common in the shale, with five genera known from the site.

Ctenophora
Genus	Class	Locality of Origin	Notes	Images
Siphusauctum	Stem-group Ctenophora	Tulip Beds	A stem-group ctenophore colloquially known as the "Tulip animal" due to its flower-like appearance. It lived by attaching itself to the substrate by a holdfast, it had a tulip-shaped body, called a calyx, into which it actively pumped water that entered through pores and filtered out and digested organic contents. It grew to a length of only about 20 cm (7.9 in).	
Dinomischus	Stem-group Ctenophora	Walcott Quarry; Raymond Quarry; Tulip Beds	A stem-group ctenophore that sat on the ocean floor with a long stalk, and a small holdfast. The cup-shaped body at the top of the stalk probably fed by filtering the surrounding seawater, and may have created a current to facilitate this.	
Ctenorhabdotus	Ctenophora	Walcott Quarry; Raymond Quarry; Tulip Beds	This ctenophore had rows of cilia to help it swim in the water column. It had around 24 comb rows on its body, around three times as more than extant comb jellies.	
Fasciculus	Ctenophora	Walcott Quarry	This stem-group ctenophore lived around 515 to 505 million years ago. It had two rows of long and short comb rows, a feature not seen in the fossil record or among modern species.	
Xanioascus	Ctenophora	Collins Quarry	This ctenophore had 24 comb rows - in contrast to all modern forms which have only 8, and was described in 1996 by Simon Conway Morris.	

== Hemichordata ==
Many of the Hemichordates from the shale have either remained enigmatic, or were once classified under other groupings.

Hemichordata
Genus	Class	Locality of Origin	Notes	Images
Chaunograptus	Graptolithina?	Walcott Quarry	This enigmatic hemichordate has been interpreted as a possible graptolite.	
Gyaltsenglossus		Odaray Mountain	A basal hemichordate, sharing characters of both pterobranchs and enteropneusts	
Oesia	incertae sedis	Walcott Quarry; Marble Canyon	This common, enigmatic worm-like organism has been interpreted as either a chaetognath, or some kind of hemichordate. Some fossils have been found in Margaretia, which is a mysterious fossil that has been found to possibly represent some kind of organic tube that this hemichordate used as a nest.	
Yuknessia	Pterobranchia	Walcott Quarry; Trilobite Beds	This colonial pterobranch (a grouping of filter feeding hemichordates that live in tubes on the ocean floor) was originally interpreted as a green algae.	
Dalyia	Pterobranchia?	Walcott Quarry; Trilobite Beds	A possible pterobranch.	
Spartobranchus	Enteropneusta	Walcott Quarry	An acorn worm. It is similar to the modern representatives of the family Harrimaniidae, distinguished by branching fiber tubes. It is a believed predecessor of Pterobranchia, but this species is intermediate between these two classes. Studies show that these tubes were lost in the line leading to modern acorn worm, but remained in the graptolites.	

== Annelida ==
A number of different Annelid worms are known from the shale.

Annelids
Genus	Phylum	Class	Locality of Origin	Notes	Images
Burgessochaeta	Annelida	Polychaeta	Walcott Quarry	A bristle worm that used tentacles to feel for food. It had 24 segments, each carrying a pair of appendages used for propulsion. is thought to have been a decomposer or scavenger on organic material. Specimens have been found from both continental slope and deep-water environments, indicating that this was a widespread animal.	
Canadia	Annelida	Polychaeta	Walcott Quarry	A genus of annelid worm. The animal's most notable feature is the many notosetae (rigid setae extending from dorsal branches of notopodia) along the back of the animal that are characteristic of polychaete worms. It would have had the ability to creep along the seafloor using the ventral counterpart of the notopodia, which are termed neuropodia.	
Insolicorypha	Annelida	Polychaeta	Walcott Quarry	a genus of polychaetes known from the Burgess Shale. A single specimen of Insolicorypha is known from the Greater Phyllopod bed. This creature is the rarest polychaete from the shale.	
Peronochaeta	Annelida	Polychaeta	Walcott Quarry	a genus of annelid. 19 specimens of Peronochaeta are known from the Greater Phyllopod bed, where they constitute < 0.1% of the community.	
Stephenoscolex	Annelida	Polychaeta	Walcott Quarry	A slender bristle worm that was covered in a large number of tiny bristles. Stephenoscolex contributes 0.29% of the total faunal community.	
Kootenayscolex	Annelida	non-applicable	Walcott Quarry; Marble Canyon	An annelid worm. It appears to have been an aquatic worm with about 56 bristles on each of up to 25 segments, serving to propel it through mud or water.	
Ursactis	Annelida	non-applicable	Tokumm Creek; Marble Canyon	A small polychaete worm, roughly 3–15 millimetres (0.1–0.6 in) long. The anterior region bears a pair of large palps. It has between 8 and 10 segments, a smaller number than other most polychaetes.	

== Priapulida ==
Various stem-group priapulids are known from the Burgess Shale.

Priapulids
Genus	Phylum	Class	Locality of Origin	Notes	Images
Ancalagon	Priapulida (?)	Archaeopriapulida	Walcott Quarry	An extinct priapulid worm. This worm averaged around 6 centimeters in length. Its proboscis was armed with circum-oral hooks at the anterior. There were about 10 of these hooks, with all of them being equal in size.	
Fieldia	Priapulida (?)	Archaeopriapulida	Walcott Quarry	This priapulid was originally interpreted as an arthropod; its trunk bears a dense covering of spines. It most likely fed on sea-floor mud, evidenced by the frequent presence of sediments preserved in its gut.	
Lecythioscopa	Priapulida	Archaeopriapulida	Walcott Quarry	A genus of Archaeopriapulid.	
Louisella	Priapulida (?)	Archaeopriapulida	Walcott Quarry	A genus of priapulid worm. It was originally described by Charles Walcott in 1911 as a holothurian echinoderm. It's also been interpreted as an annelid and a sipunculan, (neither on particularly compelling grounds) and a priapulid.	
Ottoia	Priapulida (?)	Archaeopriapulida	Walcott Quarry; Raymond Quarry; Collins Quarry; Tulip Beds	This priapulid is the most common worm of the Burgess shale. Ottoia was a burrower that hunted prey with its eversible proboscis. It also appears to have scavenged on dead organisms.	
Scolecofurca	Priapulida (?)	Stem-group	Raymond Quarry	The only known species in the genus, Scolecofurca rara was first described by Conway Morris in 1977 as a possible primitive priapulid, but later shown to belong to the priapulid stem group. Scolecofurca's single fossil specimen is 6.5 centimeters in length. The fossil displays a proboscis, which bore two 3 millimeter-long tentacles at the anterior. The tentacles most likely would have functioned for sensory purposes rather than for feeding.	
Selkirkia	Priapulida (?)	Archaeopriapulida	Walcott Quarry; Raymond Quarry; Collins Quarry; Tulip Beds; Trilobite Beds; Marble Canyon	A genus of predatory, tubicolous priapulid worm. Many burrows of this worm have been found in the shale, but many of them (up to 80%) have been found empty without the worms in them.	

== Mollusca ==
The molluscs of the Burgess shale are diverse in body shapes, the ecological niches they filled, and their enigmatic qualities.

Mollusca
Genus	Phylum	Class	Locality of Origin	Notes	Images
Odontogriphus	Mollusca (?)		Walcott Quarry; Tulip Beds	A bilaterian animal that had a flat, oval shaped body. This creature possessed a rasping tongue covered in multiple rows of teeth. Due to this feature resembling a radula, this creature is thought to represent a basal mollusk.	
Oikozetetes	Animalia	incertae sedis	Walcott Quarry	An enigmatic shelled fossil that is possibly thought to represent a halkieriid, which have been considered early mollusks.	
Orthrozanclus	Mollusca	Halkieriidae	Walcott Quarry	A two centimeter sized mollusk that was covered in a wide array of spines. This creature's name means "Dawn scythe". While this animal's placement is somewhat controversial, it has been aligned with the halkieriids, possibly linking them to Wiwaxia.	
Scenella	Mollusca	Superfamily Scenelloidea	Walcott Quarry; Raymond Quarry; Trilobite Beds	A disk shaped mollusk that is somewhat enigmatic, and has been placed in a number of different groups (Gastropoda, Helcionelloida, or Monoplacophora). This mollusk is common in the shale, where they are often found in dense clusters.	
Wiwaxia	Mollusca?		Walcott Quarry; Raymond Quarry; Collins Quarry; Trilobite Beds; Tulip Beds	This animal possessed a set of carbonaceous scales and spines that protected it from predators. It resembled Orthrozanclus in appearance, but its placement in mollusca is still debated.	

== Brachiopods ==
Many of the brachiopods from the site are members of the class Lingulata.

Brachiopoda
Genus	Class	Locality of Origin	Notes	Images
Acanthotretella	Lingulata	Walcott Quarry	Acanthotretella was a brachiopod of the class Lingulata. Most of the specimens of the genus were found within Walcott quarry, but it is one of the more rare brachiopods found in the site with it accounting for only 0.05% of the entire fauna. It reached a maximum size of around 8 mm in length. Like most brachiopods, it was a suspension feeder, but uniquely it attached itself to the seabed with a long pedicle.	
Acrothyra	Lingulata	Walcott Quarry	A species of gregarious brachiopod. It was originally described by Walcott in 1924. It had a short pedicle, and most likely lived in groups with one another and filter fed with their lophophores.	
Diraphora	Rhynchonellata	Walcott Quarry; Tulip Beds	An early rhynchonellatid brachiopod that had rigid appearance to its shell.	
Dictyonina	Paterinata	Trilobite Beds	A brachiopod belonging to the extinct order Paterinida.	
Lingulella	Lingulata	Walcott Quarry	A genus of phosphatic-shelled brachiopod. It is known from the Burgess Shale to the Upper Ordovician Bromide Formation in North America. Some specimens of the brachiopod preserve the pedicle intact, which is normally rare in the fossil record. This brachiopod is thought to have been a generalist, as it appears consistently common throughout the strata of the Burgess Shale.	
Linnarssonia	Lingulata		A brachiopod belonging to the family Acrotretidae.	
Micromitra	Paterinata	Walcott Quarry; Raymond Quarry; Tulip Beds	This genus is the most ornamented of the Burgess Shale brachiopods. This creature reached a size of around 10 mm in length. Many specimens of Micromitra have been found attached to the sponge Pirania, suggesting an epibenthic lifestyle for this brachiopod. This creature had a large amount of bristles (setae) that extended far beyond the rim of the shell.	
Nisusia	Kutorginata	Walcott Quarry; Tulip Beds	An early rhynchonelliform brachiopod. Nisusias pedicle emerged from between its valves, as displayed by silicified material of N. sulcata, though it still has an opening at the apex of the pedicle valve.	
Paterina	Paterinata	Walcott Quarry; Trilobite Beds	A brachiopod that shows prominent growth lines on its fossils. They are very rare in the Phyllopod bed, with it only making up 0.03% of the community.	

== Cnidaria ==
A wide variety of cnidarians like scyphozoans and conulariids are known from this site.

Cnidaria
Genus	Class	Locality of Origin	Notes	Images
Byronia	Scyphozoa?(Order Byroniida)	Trilobite Beds; Walcott Quarry; Raymond Quarry	Byronia is thought to represent the polyp stage of a scyphozoan cnidarian that built narrow, chitinous tubes (theca) that were attached to the substrate by a disc. How this animal fed is unknown, but compared to other coexisting genera like Cambrorhytium, it is thought to have been a carnivore or a suspension feeder. It is thought to be closely related to coronatid scyphozoans. It was first described back in 1899.	
Cambrorhytium	Staurozoa	Trilobite Beds; Walcott Quarry; Raymond Quarry; Tulip Beds	An enigmatic animal that was first described in 1908, and has been classified under a number of different groups. Currently it is thought to possibly represent a staurozoan cnidarian, more specifically a conulariid. It has also been interpreted as a cnidarian polyp of some description. The other possible affinity is with the hyolithid lophophorates.	
Burgessomedusa	Medusozoa	Raymond Quarry	A free swimming medusa, likely either a stem group to Cubozoa or Acraspeda (the clade containing Staurozoa, Cubozoa and Scyphozoa).	
Sphenothallus sp.	Staurozoa	Trilobite Beds	A problematic genus lately attributed to the holdfasts of conulariids. It was very widespread in paleozoic environments, and has been found attached to other fossils. Sphenothallus is represented in the Mount Stephen trilobite beds (which are a part of the Burgess Shale), where it co-occurs with the coexisting organisms Cambrorhythium and Byronia.	
Tubulella	stem-group	Trilobite Beds; Tulip Beds; Walcott Quarry; Raymond Quarry	A stem-group cnidarian that lived in a slender, conical tube. This creature was most likely related to scyphozoans.	

== Echinodermata ==
The echinoderms of the shale represent extinct groups distantly related to extant groups.

Echinodermata
Genus	Class	Locality of Origin	Notes
Gogia	Eocrinoidea	Walcott Quarry; Trilobite Beds	This echinoderm was a primitive member of the eocrinoid group (which despite the name weren't closely related to crinoids). This creature had a plated body that formed a "bowling pin" shape.
Lyracystis	Eocrinoidea	Walcott Quarry; Raymond Quarry; Collins Quarry; Trilobite Beds	This echinoderm was another eocrinoid, and a close relative of Gogia. This creatures arms formed a shape similar to a lyre.
Walcottidiscus	Edrioasteroidea	Walcott Quarry	This echinoderm is one of the earliest confirmed members of the edrioasteroidea, a grouping of pentagonally shaped echinoderms.

== Chordata ==
Chordates are very rare in the shale, but the two that are known are possibly being very important in the study of these creatures' earlier evolutions.

Chordata
Genus	Locality of Origin	Notes	Images
Metaspriggina	Walcott Quarry; Marble Canyon	A genus of chordate that is considered to represent one of the earliest and most primitive members of the vertebrate lineage. It was likely a filter feeder that lived in the open water column.	
Pikaia	Walcott Quarry	A basal chordate described in 1911 by Walcott as an annelid worm, and in 1979 by Harry B. Whittington and Simon Conway Morris as a chordate. It became the "most famous early chordate fossil." Pikaia swam through the Cambrian oceans like a modern fish. It is noted for some fairly unusual anatomical features, including a pair of tentacles on the head. It is currently thought to be a relatively primitive chordate that is less closely related to modern vertebrates than Metaspriggina is.	

== Gnathifera ==
A number of different gnathiferans, including chaetognaths (arrow worms) and more basal stem-group lineages are known from the Burgess Shale.

Gnathifera
Genus	Phylum	Locality of Origin	Notes	Images
Capinatator	Chaetognatha	Collins Quarry; Walcott Quarry	A giant, 10 centimetres (3.9 in) long arrow worm (chateognaths). It has the distinction of having 50 spines around its mouth. As with modern arrow worms, the spines were used to grasp prey for consumption. C. praetermissus is thought to represent a stage of chaetognathan evolution before arrow worms became planktonic swimmers.	
Amiskwia	Total group Gnathifera	Walcott Quarry	A large, soft bodied animal. Recently it has been interpreted as a gnathiferan, which are generally small spiralians characterized by complex jaws made of chitin, possibly as an early relative of chaetognaths.	
Nectocaris	Total group Chaetognatha	Walcott Quarry; Raymond Quarry; Collins Quarry	A squid like-predator that is rare in the shale. Has been controversially suggested to be a cephalopod, but this is rejected by most scholars, and now it suggested to be an early diverging relative of chaetognaths. This animal had a kite shaped body, and a single pair of tentacles. It was originally considered some kind of arthropod hence its name meaning (Swimming shrimp).	

== Chancellorids ==
An extinct group of enigmatic sponge-like animals covered in hollow spines

Incertae sedis
Genus	Phylum	Class	Locality of Origin	Notes	Images
Chancelloria	non-applicable	Chancelloriidae	Many of the areas of the shale	Superficially, this animal resembles a sea sponge, covered in spine-like sclerites. However it is a member of the extinct group Chancelloriidae, whose relationship to other animals are unclear.	
Archiasterella	non-applicable	Chancelloriidae	Many of the areas of the shale	A genus of chancellorid known from the Burgess Shale and earlier deposits, and originally described as Chancelloria by Walcott. The species may represent form taxa rather than true species.	
Allonnia	non-applicable	Chancelloriidae	Many of the areas of the shale	A genus of chancelloriid.	

== Cyanobacteria ==
Cyanobacteria are photosynthesizers, and would have been important in the shale.

Cyanobacteria
Genus	Phylum	Class	Locality of Origin	Notes	Images
Marpolia	Nostocales	non-applicable	Walcott Quarry; Tulip Beds	This genus has been interpreted as a cyanobacterium, but also resembles the modern cladophoran green algae. It is known from the Middle Cambrian Burgess Shale and Early Cambrian deposits from the Czech Republic. It consists of a dense mass of entangled, twisted filaments. It may have been free-floating or grown on other objects, although there is no evidence of attachment structures.	
Morania	Cyanobacteria	Cyanophyceae	Walcott Quarry	A genus of cyanobacterium preserved as carbonaceous films. it is present throughout the shale, with thousands of specimens being known. It formed filamentous sheets, and resembles the modern cyanobacterium Nostoc. It would have had a role in binding the sediment together, and would have been a food source for such organisms as Odontogriphus and Wiwaxia.	

== Red algae (Rhodophyta) ==
Red algae are found in the shale, with three genera being known.

Rhodophyta
Genus	Class	Locality of Origin	Notes	Images
Bosworthia	Non applicable	Walcott Quarry	A genus of branching photosynthetic alga. 20 specimens of Bosworthia are known from the Greater Phyllopod bed, where they constitute 0.04% of the community. One of its two original species has since been reassigned to Walcottophycus.	
Dictyophycus	Non applicable	Walcott Quarry	A putative red algae. It formed leaf-like lobes that measured around 25mm across. Only the sturdier parts of the skeleton are known.	
Wahpia	Rhodophyceae	Walcott Quarry; Trilobite Beds; Tulip Beds	This small alga had an array of small, slender branches. It constitutes around 0.06% of the Phyllopod Bed community.	
Waputikia	Rhodophyceae	Walcott Quarry	a possible red alga from the Burgess shale. It consists of a main stem about 1 cm across, with the longest recovered fossil 6 cm in length. Branches of a similar diameter emerge from the side of the main branch, then rapidly bifurcate to much finer widths. This genus is the rarest rhodophyte from the shale.	

== Incertae sedis and miscellaneous ==
This section documents organisms from the shale whose taxonomic affinities are not fully understood, or that do not fit into any of the above groups.

Incertae sedis
Genus	Phylum	Class	Locality of Origin	Notes	Images
Banffia	Vetulicolia	Heteromorphida	Raymond Quarry; Collins Quarry	This bizarre deuterostome animal was a member of the Vetulicolia, whose placement in the tree of life has remained controversial. However, due to certain characteristics e.g. lacking gill slits, it may not be a vetulicolian, instead being placed closer to Protostomia.	
Margaretia	Incertae sedis	problematica	Raymond Quarry	This frondose organism has been found with Oesia inside it.	
Echmatocrinus	Animalia	non-applicable	Walcott Quarry; Raymond Quarry	This animal resembles a crinoid or an octocoral in appearance. It had a crown of seven-nine tentacles. This organism lived a solitary lifestyle, although juveniles are sometimes attached to (or budding from) adults.	
Eldonia	Deuterostoma	Unranked Cambroernida	Walcott Quarry; Raymond Quarry	A soft bodied, disk shaped animal. Currently it is thought to have been a cambroernid, which is a group of basal ambulacrarians.	
Herpetogaster	Deuterostoma	Unranked Cambroernida	Walcott Quarry; Raymond Quarry; Collins Quarry; Stanley Glacier	A genus of cambroernid animal. It is most likely to have fed by snaring either small prey or edible particles in the tentacles and bringing the tentacles to the mouth. This animal secured itself to hard surfaces by using an extensible stolon that emerged from the body at about the ninth segment and secured the animal. It is often found secured to the sponge Vauxia.	
Mackenzia	Animalia	Mackenziidae	Walcott Quarry; Raymond Quarry; Tulip Beds	An elongated bag-like animal. It has been found attached directly to hard surfaces, such as brachiopod shells. Mackenzia was originally described by Charles Walcott in 1911 as a holothurian echinoderm. It was later reinterpreted as a cnidarian, and may have been related to modern sea anemones. However, a paper from 2022 discovered that this genus may be closely related to members of the Ediacaran biota.	
Platydendron	Platyhelminthes?	Polycladida?	Unclear	A flatworm-like organism only known from one fossil, with possible preservation of a branching intestine.	
Pollingeria	Animalia	non-applicable	Walcott Quarry; Raymond Quarry	This problematic genus is worm-like in appearance, and is long and thin. Originally it was thought that these fossils represented the chaetae of polychaete worms. More recently, it has been assumed that each individual "chip" represents an entire organism. In the photo, Panels 7, 8 and 9 depict Pollingeria.	
Portalia	Animalia	non-applicable	Walcott Quarry	This creature is one of the many Burgess shale organisms that Walcott interpreted as a sea cucumber. More recently it has been suggested to have been a sponge.	
Scathascolex	Animalia	Palaeoscolecida	Walcott Quarry	A priapulid-like palaeoscolecid worm	
Priscansermarinus	Animalia	non-applicable Arthropoda?	Walcott Quarry; Raymond Quarry	This enigmatic creature was first interpreted as a lepadomorph barnacle. This would push back the origins of this crustacean group by another 200 or so million years. Recently its status as a barnacle, or even an arthropod in general has been questioned.	
Haplophrentis	Lophotrochozoa	Hyolithia	Walcott Quarry; Raymond Quarry; Collins Quarry; Trilobite Beds; Stanley Glacier; Marble Canyon	Haplophrentis was a hyolith, a grouping of strange, conical shelled invertebrates that lived throughout the Paleozoic. This animal was a filter feeder, using its lophophore to extract organic matter from passing seawater. The soft bodied fossils of this genus were important in establishing hyoliths as possible members of the lophophorata alongside brachiopods and bryozoans.	
Fuxianospira				A filamentous fossil considered either to represent an alga or a coprolite.	
Tontoia	Unknown	Unknown		Initially suggested to represent an external mould of an arthropod exoskeleton, but it currently considered a nomen dubium, and it is unclear as to whether it is even an arthropod at all.	
Thaumaptilon	Unknown	Unknown	Walcott Quarry	Thaumaptilon is a genus of feather shaped animal from the shale which some authors have compared to members of the Ediacaran biota, which went extinct long before the Burgess shale was deposited. More specifically, it has been compared to the Ediacaran organism Charnia. It got up to 20 cm long, and attached itself to the sea floor with a holdfast. One side of its surface was covered in spots, which might have been zooids.	
