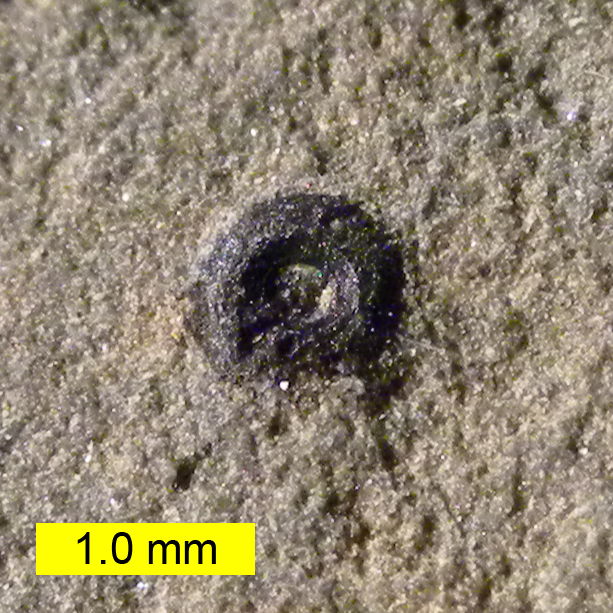
- Sphenothallus holdfast from the Kope Formation (Upper Ordovician), Gunpowder Creek, Kentucky.

Scientific classification
- Kingdom: Animalia
- Phylum: Cnidaria
- Order: †Conulatae
- Clade: †Conulariida
- Genus: †Sphenothallus; Hall, 1847

= Sphenothallus =

Sphenothallus Temporal range: Upper Lower Cambrian–Mississippian (Note: Earliest, upper Lower Cambrian (Van Iten et al 2002); latest, not referenced; at least to Mississippian)

Extinct genus of aquatic animals

Sphenothallus is a problematic extinct genus lately attributed to the conulariids. It was widespread in shallow marine environments during the Paleozoic.

== Occurrence ==
Sphenothallus is represented in the Cambrian period in the Kaili biota and the Mount Stephen trilobite beds, where it co-occurs with the similar organisms Cambrorhythium and Byronia. It is known in younger strata in Canada and the US, surviving at least until the Mississippian.

== Ecology ==
Sphenothallus lived in groups as an opportunist in environments from hardgrounds to soft mud, even if depleted in oxygen. It probably dispersed via larvae.
