= Cambropodus =

Cambropodus Temporal range: Wuliuan, 507 Ma

Scientific classification
- Domain: Eukaryota
- Kingdom: Animalia
- Phylum: Arthropoda
- Class: incertae sedis
- Genus: †Cambropodus; Robison, 1990
- Species: †C. gracilis

Binomial name
- †Cambropodus gracilis Robison, 1990

Extinct genus of arthropod

Cambropodus is a genus of Cambrian arthropod from the Wheeler Shale of Utah. It contains one species, Cambropodus gracilis.

== Description ==
Cambropodus is only known from a partial specimen preserving what seems to be the front end of the body. It preserves nine pairs of appendages, all uniramous and likely used for walking, which bear some similarity to the legs of Scutigeromorpha. Due to their flexibility, they likely had between four and six podomeres, although the exact amount is unclear. The head also preserves two long antenniform structures. However, unlike myriapods, Cambropodus has no specialised head limbs, and instead the first two limb pairs are very similar to the rest. On the head, the limbs are more laterally attached, however they become more ventrally attached on the body. The complete animal is estimated to be roughly 2 cm long, with at least 15 pairs of appendages. The gut is preserved as a light stripe down the middle of the fossil, with no apparent gut diverticula and a likely very long midgut. No respiratory organs are preserved, therefore it likely respired through its thin exoskeleton. Cambropodus shares many similarities to the enigmatic fossil Portalia especially in the limbs, however it may be more derived and closer to Arthropoda due to the antenniform structures and apparently jointed legs. In this it resembles the myriapods more, however it is over 75 million years older than the oldest definitive myriapod, Kampecaris. Cambropodus was likely cursorial and epibenthic, as evidenced by the structure of its legs closely matching other fast arthropods. The placement of this genus within Arthropoda is uncertain, as only the front portion is preserved, alongside no clear specialisation in head limbs that would place it within Mandibulata alongside the other myriapods.

== Etymology ==
Cambropodus is an arbitrary combination of letters which derives from the age of the fossil and the arthropodan affinity of the animal. The species name gracilis comes from the Latin word for "slender", referring to the legs of the animal.
