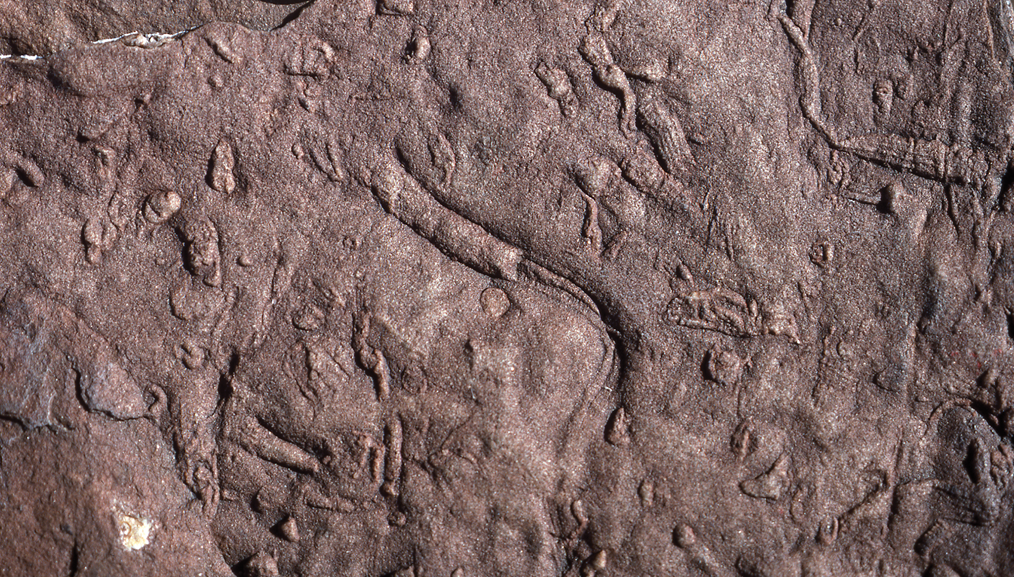
- The holotype fossil of Archaeichnium haughtoni, including other specimens

Scientific classification
- Kingdom: Animalia
- Family: †Mackenziidae (?)
- Genus: †Archaeichnium; Glaessner, 1963
- Species: †A. haughtoni

Binomial name
- †Archaeichnium haughtoni Glaessner, 1963

= Archaeichnium =

Archaeichnium Temporal range: Ediacaran 570–543 Ma

Extinct tubeular organism

Archaeichnium is a member of the Ediacaran biota (635-542 Ma) first described by Martin Glaessner in 1963. It is characterized as a tubular fossil found in the Nama Group (570-543 Ma) of South West Africa, and is a monotypic genus, containing only Archaeichnium haughtoni.

== Discovery ==
The rock containing the fossil that would eventually be named Archaeichnium haughtoni was first discovered in 1927 by Dr. H. F. Frommurze and S. H. Haughton while the two were doing geological mapping in Southwest Africa. The rock was found in the Nama Group of Cambrian age in Central/ Southern Namibia. In 1959, Haughton published the paper that described the fossils as early archaeocyathids, a taxon of sedentary reef-building organisms that doesn't usually appear in the fossil record until the late Cambrian. However, in 1963 Martin Glaessner revisited the rocks and determined that the fossilized animals did not actually distinctly possess the features that would classify it as an archaeocyathid, nor did he find it to share features with any known species. Glaessner dubbed the fossil anew as Archaeichnium haughtoni

== Description ==
Archaeichnium is a tube-shaped fossil that may be preserved as hollow or infilled tubes. The overall shape of the tube is slightly tapered at one end so that it is vaguely conical. The structure is typically between 3–5 cm long with a 0.5 cm diameter, and the walls of the tube are 0.1 cm thick. Typically, the tubes exhibit longitudinal ribbing on the exterior, which creates 10-12 distinct "ribs". Archaeichnium also has latitudinal restrictions that organize it into approximately three sections cranio-caudally. When cross-sectioned, the tube lacks septae. The fossil is typically found in cross-bedded sandstone that is interpreted as a shallow marine depositional environment. Walls of the tube are typically agglutinated with small quartz grains.

== Distribution ==
Archaeichnium fossils are found in the Nasep Quartzite stratigraphic unit within the Nama Group at the following sites:

- Nevada, United States of America
- Namibia, Africa
- Nilpena, Australia

== See also ==
- List of Ediacaran genera
- Ediacaran biota
- Nama Group
