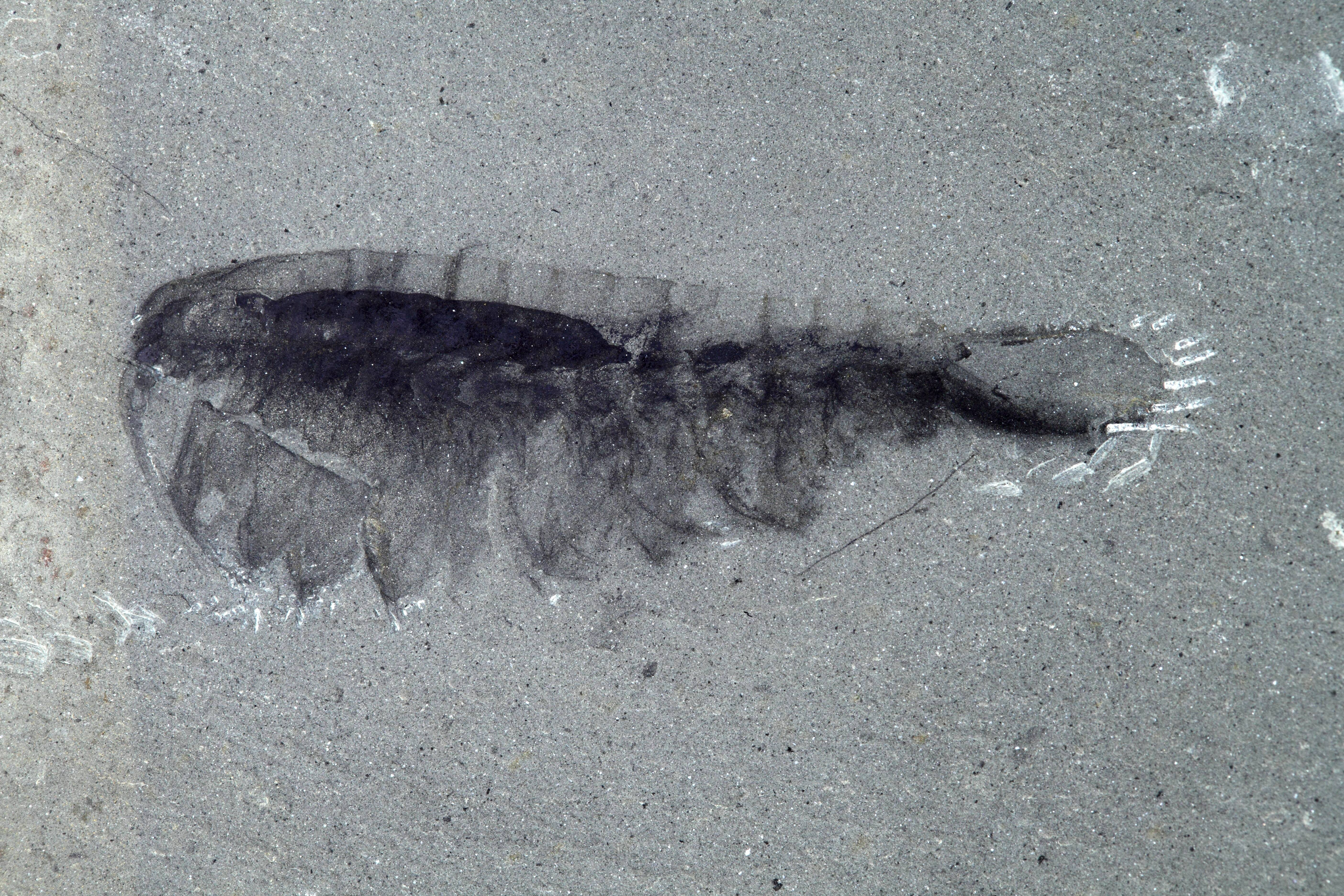
- Fossil holotype
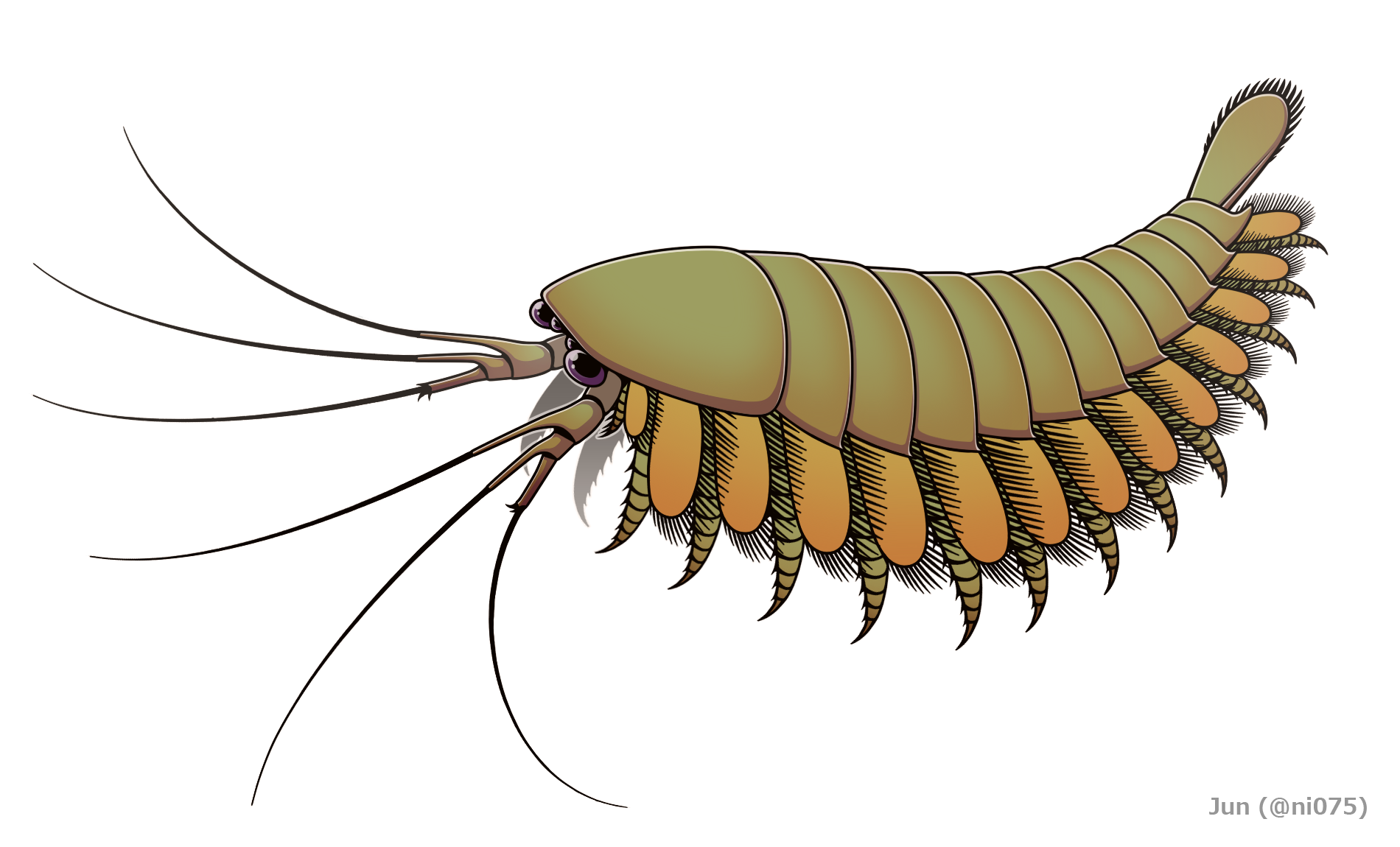
- Life restoration

Scientific classification
- Kingdom: Animalia
- Phylum: Arthropoda
- Class: †Megacheira
- Order: †Leanchoilida
- Family: †Leanchoiliidae; Simonetta & Delle Cave, 1975
- Genus: †Alalcomenaeus; Simonetta, 1970
- Species: †A. cambricus

Binomial name
- †Alalcomenaeus cambricus Simonetta, 1970

= Alalcomenaeus =

Alalcomenaeus Temporal range: Cambrian Stage 3–Mid Cambrian

Extinct genus of arthropods

Alalcomenaeus is one of the most widespread and longest-surviving arthropod genera of the Early and Middle Cambrian. Known from over 300 specimens in the Burgess Shale and the Chengjiang biota. It is a member of the family Leanchoiliidae in the group Megacheira.

== Morphology ==
Alalcomenaeus had three median eyes; two stalked, more lateral eyes; a triflagellate great appendage; and two more head appendages posterior to that. Like its body appendages, these were biramous—their inner branch was spiny, segmented, flexible and leg-like, while the outer portion had a large surface area and resembled a flap.

Alalcomenaeus reached about 6 cm in length, although many smaller specimens are known. Its head was covered with a shield, and its eleven body segments were also covered with an exoskeleton. Its body terminated with a paddle-like telson ("tail") which probably helped to propel the organism; this ended with long flat spikes in the plane of the tail fin.

== Ecology ==
The organism probably swam, wafting its outer flap-limbs in waves along its body to gain propulsion, in the manner of Anomalocaris. Its inner limb branches do not appear to be optimised for walking, although it is possible they helped the organism move along the sea floor. A variety of other functions have been suggested, such as clinging to algal fronds; they seem best suited to grabbing onto, and tearing up, other animals, suggesting that the organism was probably a scavenger. However, its large eyes and the long flagella on its great appendages, combined with its large feeding apparatus and the spines on its inner limb branches, are more consistent with a predatory lifestyle, and the most recent interpretation has it feeding on organisms that lived on or in the surface of the sea floor.

== Affinity ==
Alalcomenaeus was initially thought to fall in the stem group to the crustacea, and was placed in a clade with Leanchoilia, Actaeus and Yohoia. It was subsequently suggested to be related to the opabiniids, mainly on the basis of its great appendage. More up to date analyses place it along with Leanchoilia and Yohoia as well as Sanctacaris, Habelia, Sarotrocercus and Sidneyia, somewhere within the arachnomorpha. The closeness of Sanctacaris and Leanchoilia has been supported by subsequent work, and Actaeus is often excluded from such works as it is poorly understood. Currently, it is included within Megacheira.

== Distribution ==
Alalcomenaeus is very rare in the Walcott quarry of the Burgess Shale, so was described on the basis of half a dozen specimens. As other exposures of the Burgess Shale were unearthed, it became apparent that the creature was, in fact, a dominant member of the fauna. It has also been discovered in the Chengjiang and from Utah, giving it a long stratigraphic range. Including 596 juveniles, 618 specimens of Alalcomenaeus are known from the Greater Phyllopod bed, where they comprise 1.2% of the community.
