= Stephenospongia =

Scientific classification
- Kingdom: Animalia
- Phylum: Porifera
- Class: Hexactinellida
- Order: †Reticulosa
- Family: †Hintzespongiidae
- Genus: †Stephenospongia
- Species: †S. magnipora

Binomial name
- †Stephenospongia magnipora Rigby, 1986

Extinct genus of sponges

Stephenospongia is a genus of sponge known from a single specimen in the Trilobite beds of the Burgess Shale.
