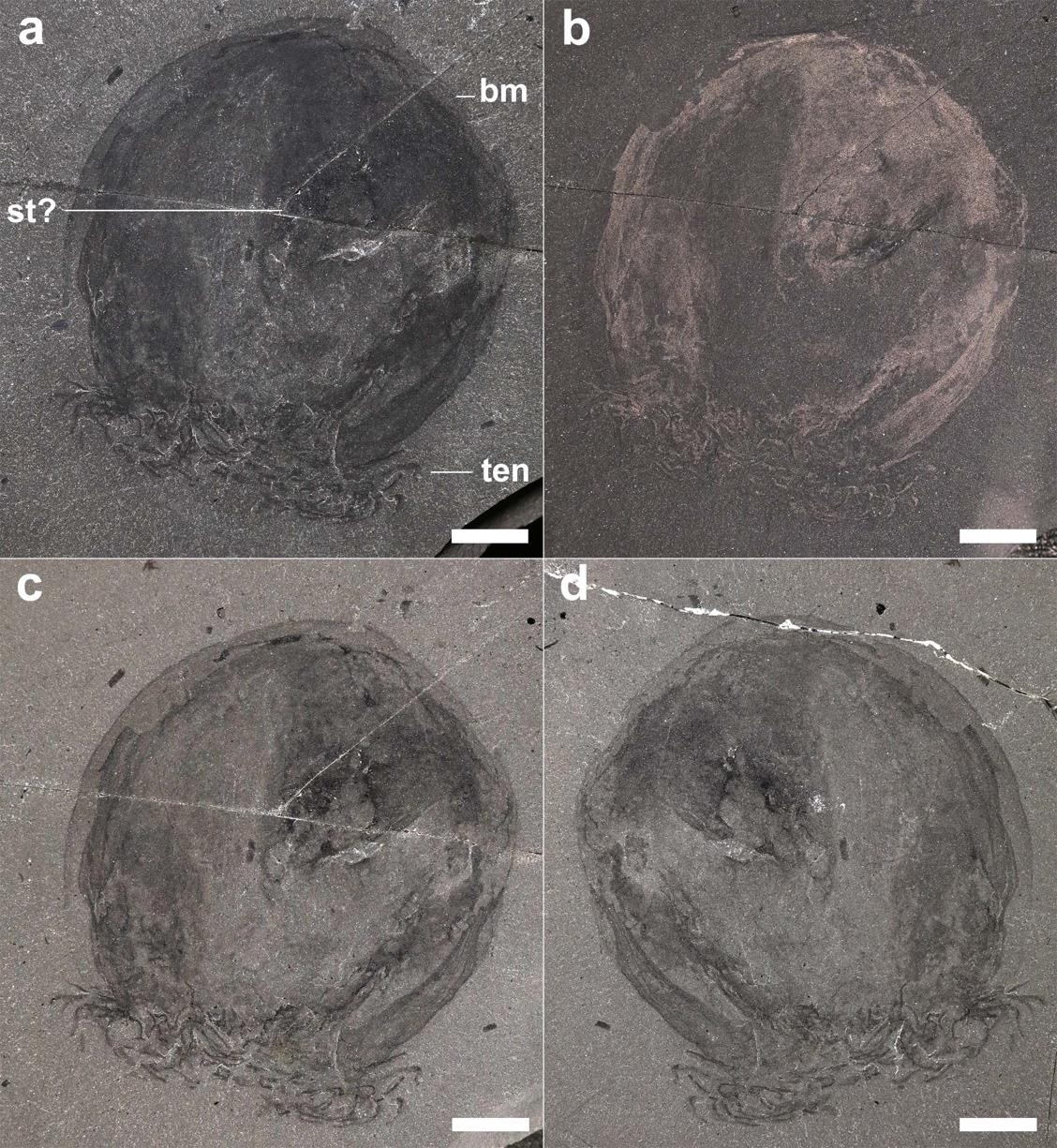
- Burgessomedusa phasmiformis specimen ROMIP65784

Scientific classification
- Kingdom: Animalia
- Phylum: Cnidaria
- Genus: †Burgessomedusa; Moon, Caron & Moysiuk, 2023
- Species: †B. phasmiformis

Binomial name
- †Burgessomedusa phasmiformis Moon, Caron & Moysiuk, 2023

= Burgessomedusa =

Burgessomedusa Temporal range: Middle Cambrian

Genus of cnidarians (fossil)

Burgessomedusa is an extinct, monotypic genus of macroscopic free-swimming cnidarians from the middle Cambrian Burgess Shale in Canada. The type species is Burgessomedusa phasmiformis. The genus was characterized by the bell-like body with about 90 short tentacles. They led a predatory lifestyle and reached a length of 20 cm. It is considered as the oldest unambiguous free-swimming medusa (commonly known as jellyfish), if potential older records from other fossil sites represent ctenophores instead.

== Etymology ==
Genus is a compound name wherein "Burgess" pertains to the geographical area Burgess Shale, and the Latin word medusa relates to the taxonomic group Medusozoa. While the species name phasmiformis is from the combination of the Greek "phasma" and the Latin "forma" words, referring to the ghostly shape of the umbrella. The authors stated that the species name was an oblique reference to the ghosts in the video game Pac-Man.

== Morphology ==
The genus exhibits a cuboidal bell-shaped umbrella, where the width spans around 40% of the umbrella's vertical dimension. More than 90 tentacles resembling fingers are distributed along the edge of the oral cavity, extending to about 15% of the umbrella's height. The stomach cavity is positioned at the highest point of the umbrella, taking up roughly 30% of the total body area.

The central part known as the manubrium extends to a length equivalent to up to two-thirds of the umbrella's size. The reproductive structures, elongated and egg-shaped gonads, occupy approximately 45% of the height of the umbrella. These gonads are situated at the corners of the umbrella, though internally they are positioned at a midpoint between the edge of the umbrella and the manubrium.

== Ecology ==
Burgessomedusa is likely to have swum using a rowing propulsion, with jet propulsion being unlikely due to a lack of structures restricting the opening. Its association with benthic species suggests that it spent at least some of its time close to the ocean floor. It was likely an active predator based on the similar shape of its bell with that of living box jellyfish.

== Classification ==
The study of evolutionary relationships indicates that Burgessomedusa belongs to Medusozoa, probably as a stem group of box jellyfish (Cubozoa) or Acraspeda (a taxon including Staurozoa, Cubozoa, and Scyphozoa), making it the oldest known free-living medusa stage known. Other supposed free-living medusa fossils from the Cambrian, such as those from the Marjum Formation of Utah and Yunannoascus from the Chengjiang biota of China are considered doubtful, and possibly ctenophores instead.

== Discovery ==
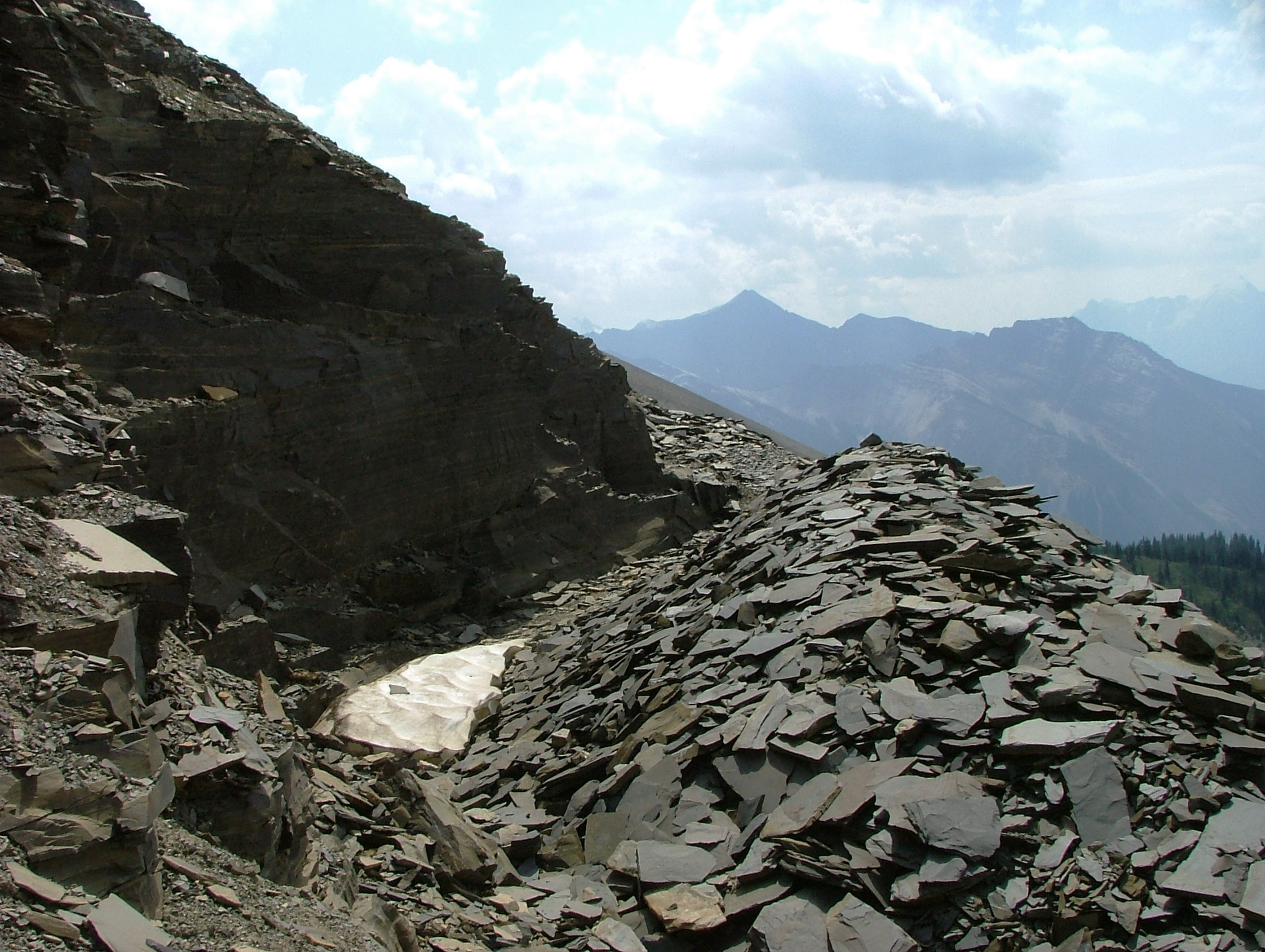
Raymond Quarry in the Burgess Shale, where the fossils were found

This research, which identifies Burgessomedusa, relies on ancient remains found in the Burgess Shale's Raymond Quarry. Researchers found 182 fossils that were mainly unearthed during the late 1980s and 1990s under the supervision of Desmond Collins, the former Curator of Invertebrate Palaeontology in Royal Ontario Museum.

Burgessomedusa fossils are remarkably well conserved within the Burgess Shale, despite jellyfish being approximately 95% water. The Royal Ontario Museum has publicized the identification of the Burgessomedusa phasmiformis as the earliest documented swimming jellyfish in the fossil archive. This breakthrough was officially documented in the journal Proceedings of the Royal Society B.

ROM visitors have the opportunity to observe some of the fossils belonging to Burgessomedusa phasmiformis showcased in the Burgess Shale division of the Willner Madge Gallery, Dawn of Life since its inauguration in 2021.

== See also ==
- Paleobiota of the Burgess Shale
