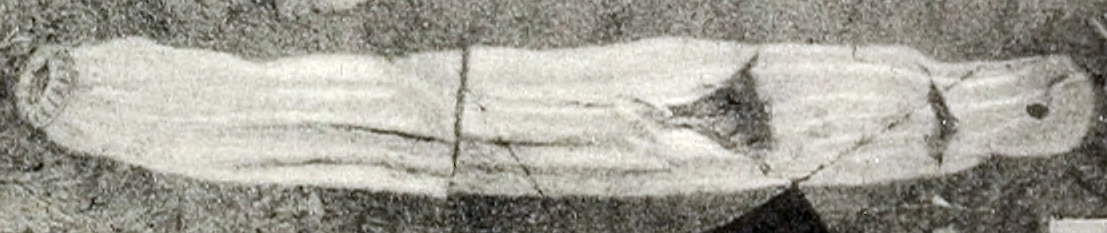
- Fossil of Mackenzia costalis

Scientific classification
- Kingdom: Animalia
- Subkingdom: Eumetazoa
- Family: †Mackenziidae; Conway Morris, 1993

Genera
- †Mackenzia; †Paramackenzia; †Archaeichnium?

= Mackenziidae =

Mackenziidae Temporal range: Cambrian Stage 3 to Wuliuan, 518–508 Ma

Family of enigmatic Cambrian animals

Mackenziidae is a family of enigmatic animals known from the Cambrian period. Their affinity has been disputed, with the type genus Mackenzia being first described as a holothurian echinoderm, before being moved to a relative of sea anemones, and finally in 2022 moved to Eumetazoa incertae sedis. The family may be related to various members of the Ediacaran biota, due to a similar arrangement of tubular modules.
