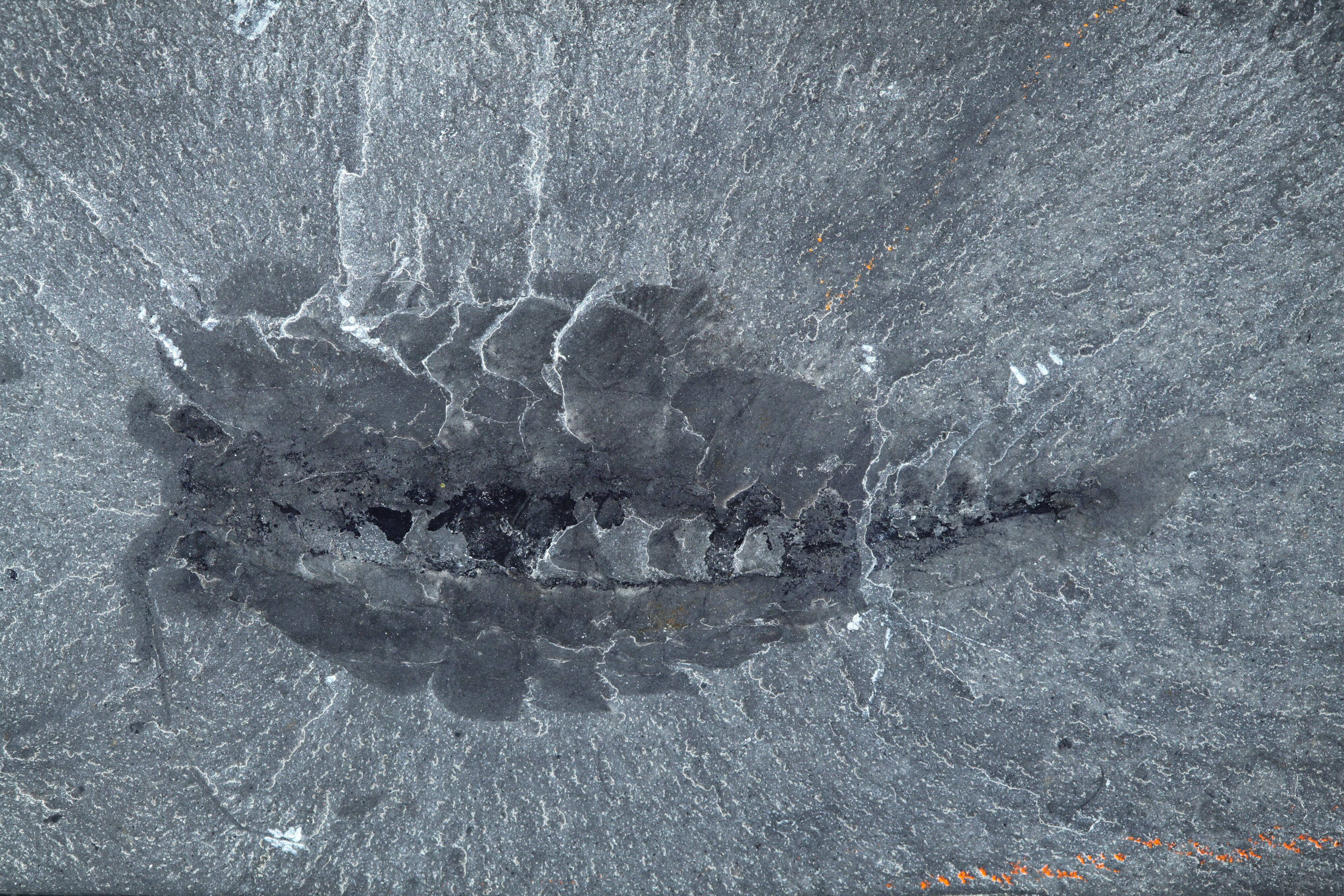
- Holotype specimen
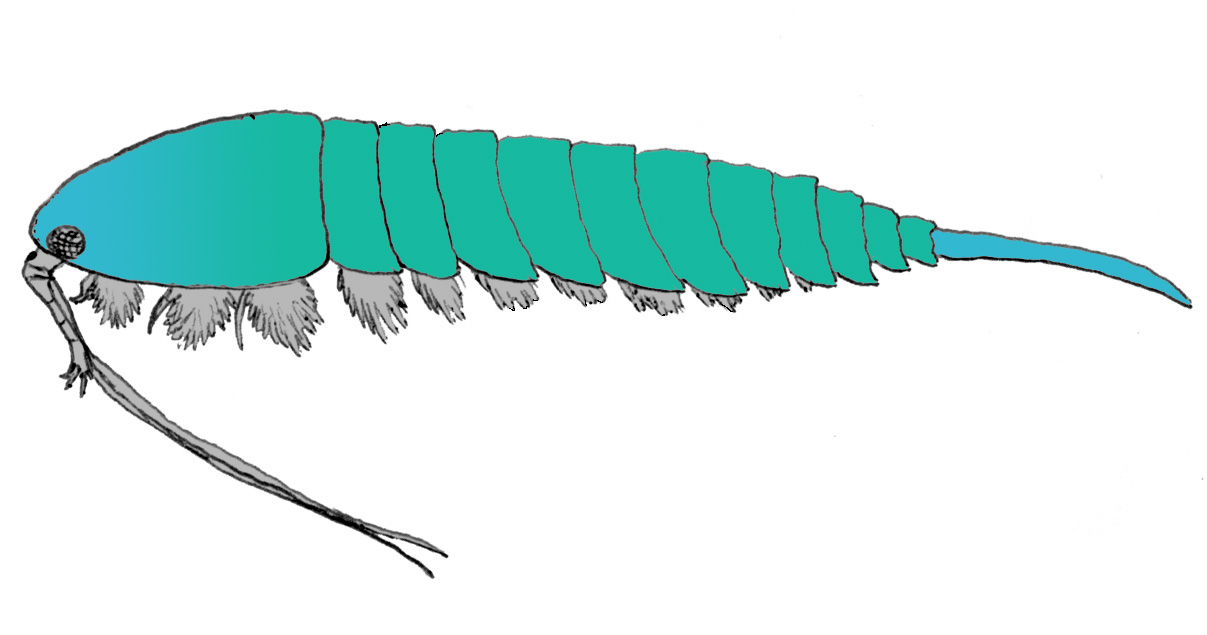
- Reconstruction of Actaeus

Scientific classification
- Kingdom: Animalia
- Phylum: Arthropoda
- Class: †Megacheira
- Order: †Leanchoilida
- Family: †Leanchoiliidae
- Genus: †Actaeus; Simonetta, 1970
- Species: †A. armatus

Binomial name
- †Actaeus armatus Simonetta, 1970

= Actaeus armatus =

Actaeus armatus Temporal range: Middle Cambrian

Extinct genus of arthropods

Actaeus is a genus of leanchoiliid megacheiran arthropod, containing the single species Actaeus armatus. It is known from a single specimen recovered from the Middle Cambrian Burgess Shale of British Columbia, Canada, and it may be actually a poorly preserved specimen of Alalcomenaeus. The specimen is over 6 cm long and has a body consisting of a head shield, 11 body tergites, and a terminal plate. It was named after Actaeus, first king of attica, and armatus a combination of greek and latin words to describe the frontal appendages of the species.
