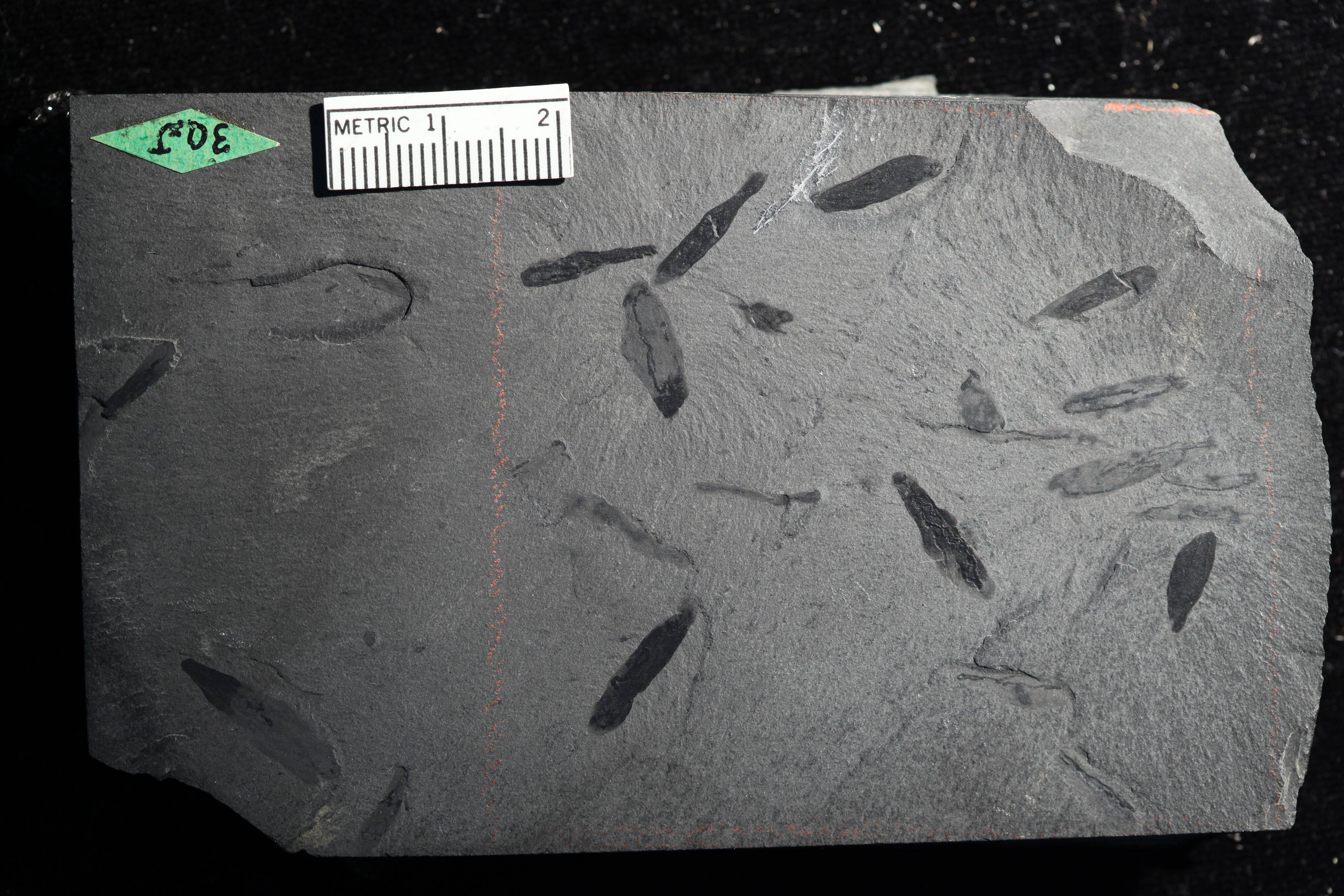
- Several specimens

Scientific classification
- Kingdom: Animalia
- Clade: Bilateria
- Genus: †Pollingeria; Walcott, 1911

Type species
- †Pollingeria grandis Walcott, 1911

= Pollingeria =

Pollingeria Temporal range: Burgess Shale

Problematic Cambrian animal

Pollingeria is a problematic genus of animals of the Middle Cambrian Burgess Shale. 3080 specimens of Pollingeria are known from the Greater Phyllopod bed, where they comprise 5.85% of the community.

== Description ==
Pollingeria are short worms, which are generally elongated and relatively thin, less than an inch long. Their shape varies widely from specimen to specimen.

In a single instance, individuals are grouped together.

== Affinity ==
The classification of Pollingeria is highly problematic: there is no obvious similarity to any organism, living or extinct. Charles Doolittle Walcott, who described the organism in 1911, suggested that it ranked among the annelid polychaete worms, considering the "chips" to represent chaetae.

More recently, Simon Conway Morris and Derek Briggs suggested that the fossils could each represent an entire organism.
