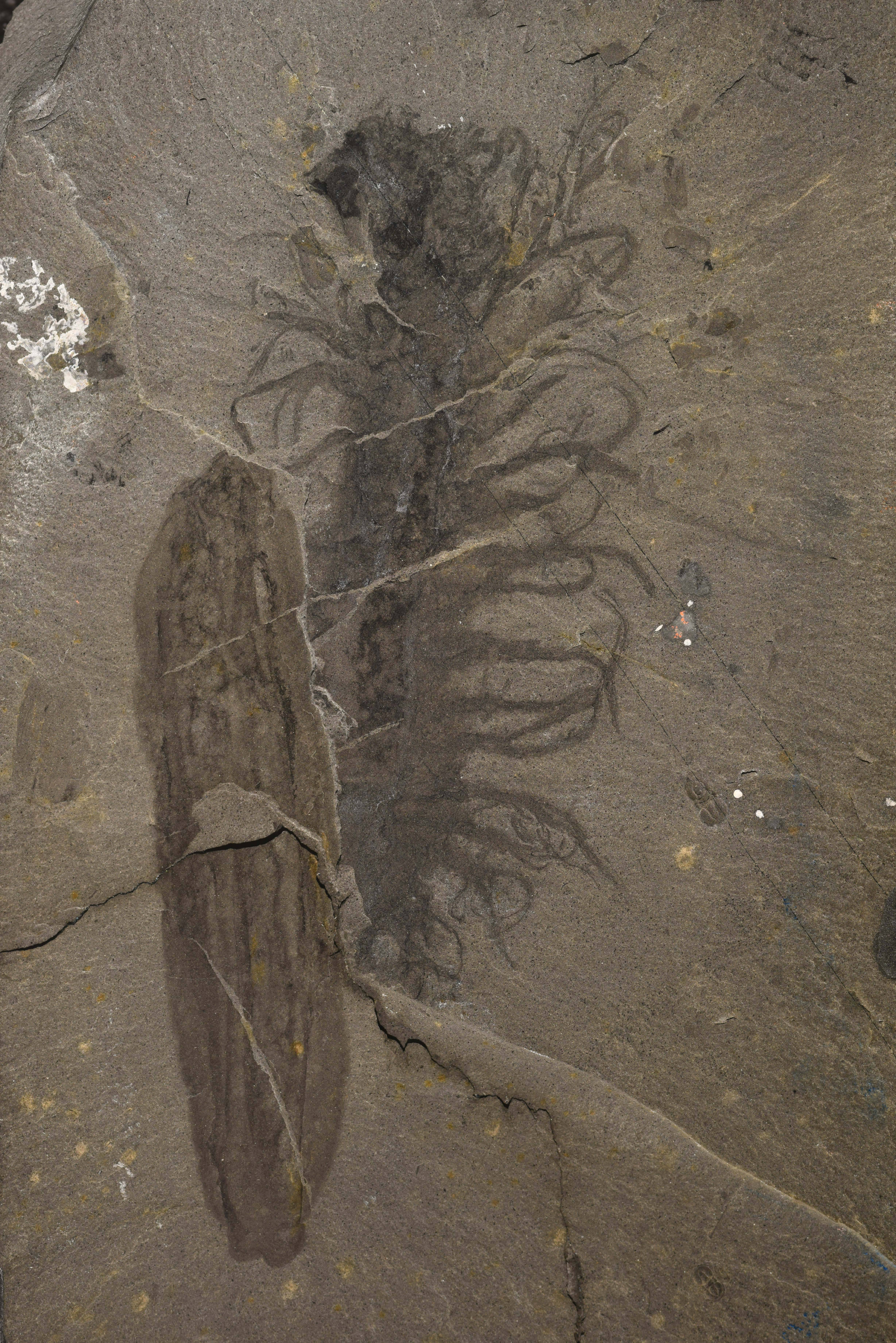
- Holotype specimen of Portalia (right) preserved with Mackenzia (left)

Scientific classification
- Kingdom: Animalia
- Phylum: incertae sedis
- Genus: †Portalia
- Species: †P. mira

Binomial name
- †Portalia mira Walcott, 1918

= Portalia =

Portalia Temporal range: Burgess Shale

Extinct genus of animal

Portalia mira is an extinct species of uncertain placement, described by American paleontologist Charles Walcott from a fossil discovered in the Burgess Shale and initially interpreted as a holothurian echinoderm by Walcott, but this interpretation has been disputed.

== Taxonomy ==
The taxonomy of this species remains unresolved. It was initially posited by Walcott that P. mira was a holothurian, but this was disputed by Frizzell and Exline (1955) and Madsen (1957), the latter of whom believed P. mira to be a kind of primitive sponge. J. Wyatt Durham wrote in 1974 that he felt that P. mira should not be rejected as a holothurian without further study.

== Description ==
When examining the fossil holotype, the main body of P. mira is relatively long and contains a central strand that could represent the alimentary canal. Elongated structures resembling tentacles arise along the length of the body and at one end there is an indistinct area that possibly included the head.
