= Cambrorhytium =

Cambrorhytium Temporal range: Chengjiang - Burgess Shale

Scientific classification
- Kingdom: Animalia
- Phylum: Cnidaria
- Order: †Conulatae
- Clade: †Conulariida
- Genus: †Cambrorhytium (Walcott 1908) Conway Morris and Robison, 1988

Species
- C. elongatum; C. fragilis Walcott 1911; C. gracilis Chang et al. 2018; C. major Walcott 1908 (type)

Extinct genus of marine invertebrates

Cambrorhytium is an enigmatic fossil genus known from the Latham Shale (California), and the Chengjiang (China) and Burgess Shale (Canadian rockies) lagerstätte. 350 specimens of Cambrorhytium are known from the Greater Phyllopod bed, where they comprise 0.7% of the community.

== Etymology ==
Its name is from the Latin rhytium, drinking horn.

== Description ==
The fossil is conical, with iterated linear markings on its walls, parallel to its base. Its wall is thin, and it lacks the keel that is distinctive of hyoliths.

It has been interpreted as a cnidarian polyp, with the interpretation suggesting that the animal lived in the tube and extended tentacles (of which no trace has been found) from the flat aperture. This is supported by similarities to Palaeoconotuba. The other possible, but probably unlikely, affinity is with the hyoliths.

Its similarity with the Lower Cambrian species Torellelloides giganteum may indicate a close relationship. Cambrorhytium has also been compared to the fossil Archotuba and Sphenothallus.

C. elongatum has been described to contain an alimentary canal in a single Chinese specimen.

== Taxonomy ==
C. major was originally described as a member of the hyolith genus Orthotheca.

C. fragilis was originally included by Charles D. Walcott in the genus Selkirkia, – a taxonomy that was retained by later workers until finally questioned and redescribed as Cambrorhytium in the eighties.
