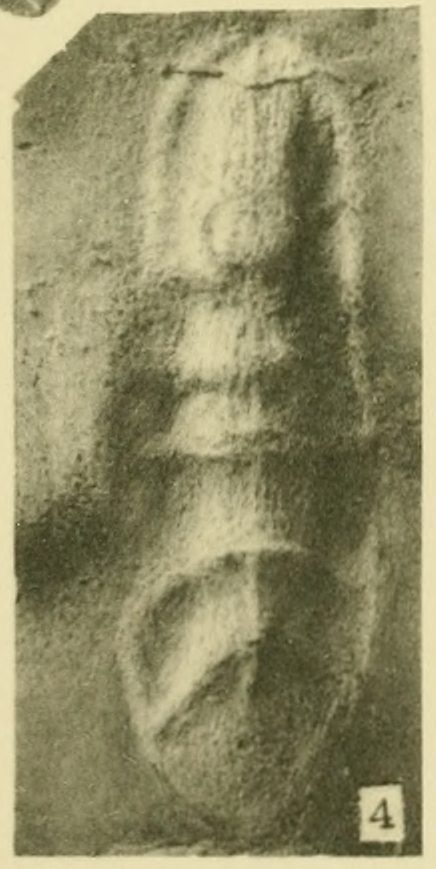
- Fossil of T. kwaguntensis from Walcott Cambrian Geology and Paleontology II

Scientific classification
- Domain: Eukaryota
- Kingdom: Animalia
- Phylum: Arthropoda
- Genus: †Tontoia; Walcott, 1912

Type species
- Tontoia kwaguntensis Walcott, 1912

= Tontoia =

Tontoia Temporal range: Miaolingian

Dubious genus of arthropod

Tontoia is a dubious genus of arthropod known from the Cambrian Burgess Shale, known from a fossil proposed to be the external mould of an arthropod exoskeleton. In its original description by Charles D. Walcott it was initially suggested that Tontoia might be a trilobite, but it is currently considered to be a nomen dubium, and it is unclear whether it even represents an arthropod.
