= Byronia =

Byronia Temporal range: upper Lower Cambrian–Silurian

Scientific classification
- Kingdom: Animalia
- Phylum: Cnidaria
- Class: Scyphozoa
- Order: †Byroniida
- Genus: †Byronia; Matthew, 1899

Extinct genus of jellyfishes

Byronia is a genus of theca-bearing cnidarians with a close affinity to the coronatid scyphozoans.
