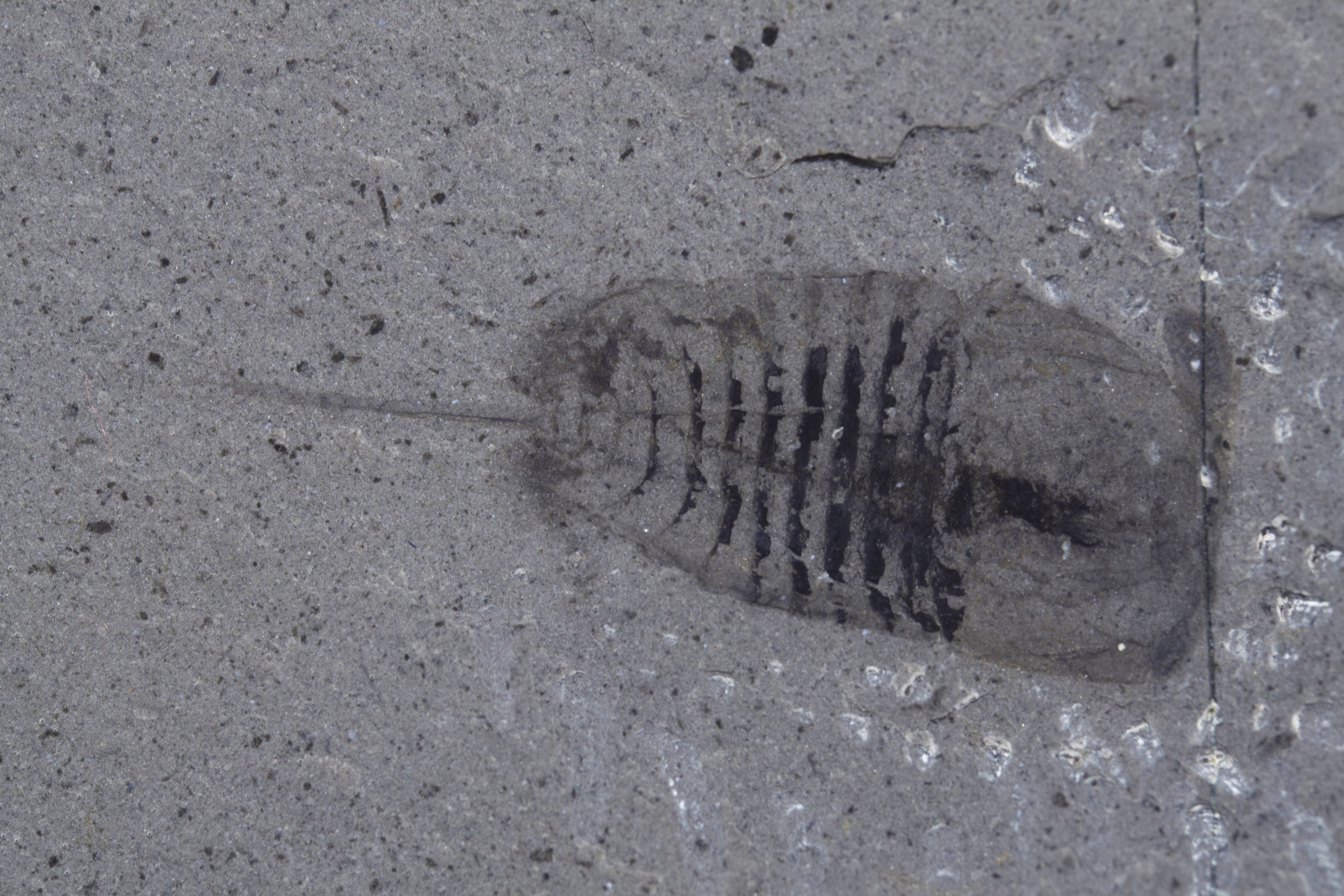
- Holotype
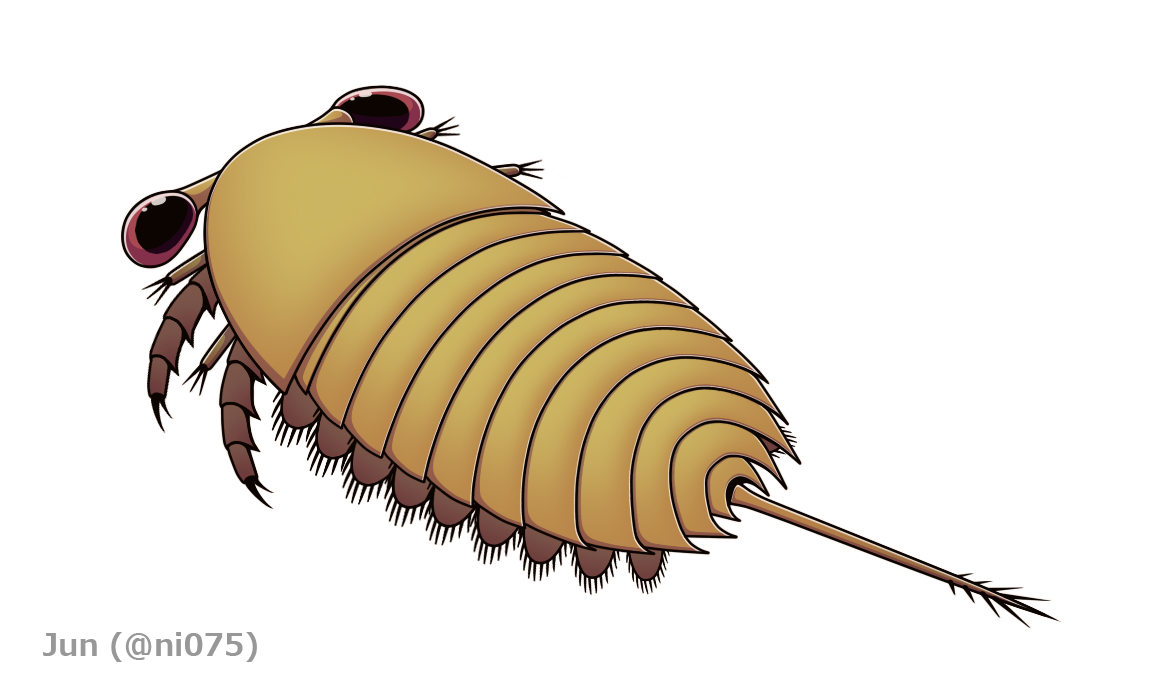
- Reconstruction of Sarotrocercus

Scientific classification
- Kingdom: Animalia
- Phylum: Arthropoda
- Class: incertae sedis
- Genus: †Sarotrocercus
- Species: †S. oblitus

Binomial name
- †Sarotrocercus oblitus Whittington, 1981

= Sarotrocercus =

Sarotrocercus Temporal range: Burgess Shale

Extinct genus of Cambrian organisms

Sarotrocercus is a small Cambrian arthropod known from Burgess Shale, reaching a centimetre or two in length (0.39–0.79 in). Sarotrocercus is only known from 7 specimens. It may lie in the arthropod crown group, and a recent study has revised some points of its original description.

== Morphology ==
Sarotrocercus had a head shield followed by a trunk of 10 or 11 segments and a telson featuring a series of spines on the end. A pair of big eyes at the end of stalks ventrally emerged from the front of the head. The head bore two pairs of sturdy appendages that are armed with rows of inner spines. At least the anterior 9 trunk segments each possess a pair of appendages, which are only known by lobe-like exopods that are fringed with setae.

== Ecology ==
In the original description, Sarotrocercus had been interpreted as a pelagic, nektonic animal that swam freely on its back, moving perhaps through movements of the trunk appendages and the action of its long tail tuft. This was mainly based on the rarity of the specimens, as the Burgess Shale contains few swimming organisms; the submarine landslides that buried organisms mainly smothered benthic and nektobenthic organisms. However, based on the redescription by Haug et al. 2011, Sarotrocercus may had been benthic or at least swimming close to the seafloor, as the robust head appendages rather suggest a grasping or raking function.
