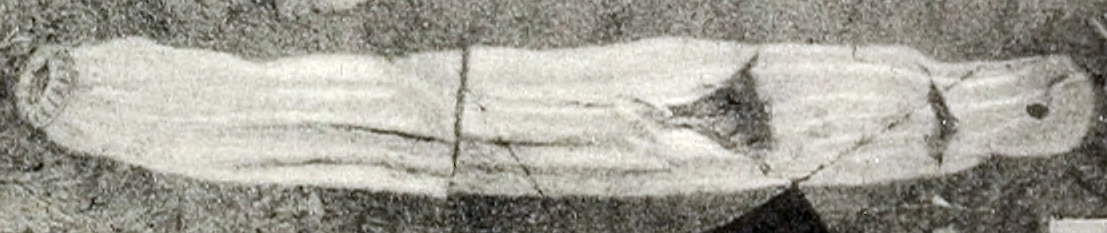
- Mackenzia costalis

Scientific classification
- Kingdom: Animalia
- Family: †Mackenziidae
- Genus: †Mackenzia; Walcott, 1911
- Species: †M. costalis

Binomial name
- †Mackenzia costalis Walcott, 1911

= Mackenzia =

Mackenzia Temporal range: Middle Cambrian, 508 Ma

Extinct genus of corals

Mackenzia is an elongated bag-like animal known from the Middle Cambrian Burgess Shale. It attached directly to hard surfaces, such as brachiopod shells. 14 specimens of Mackenzia are known from the Greater Phyllopod bed, where they comprise <0.1% of the community. Mackenzia was originally described by Charles Walcott in 1911 as a holothurian echinoderm. Later, Mackenzia is thought to be a cnidarian and appears most similar to modern sea anemones.
