= Mount Stephen trilobite beds =

Fossil strata in Canada

The Mount Stephen trilobite beds (UNSM locality 14s) are a series of fossil strata on Mount Stephen, British Columbia that contain exceptionally preserved fossil material. Part of the same stratigraphic unit as the Burgess Shale deposit, many non-mineralized parts (such as anomalocarid claws, sponges, and trilobite legs) are preserved; in addition, a high density of trilobite fossils is present.

== History ==
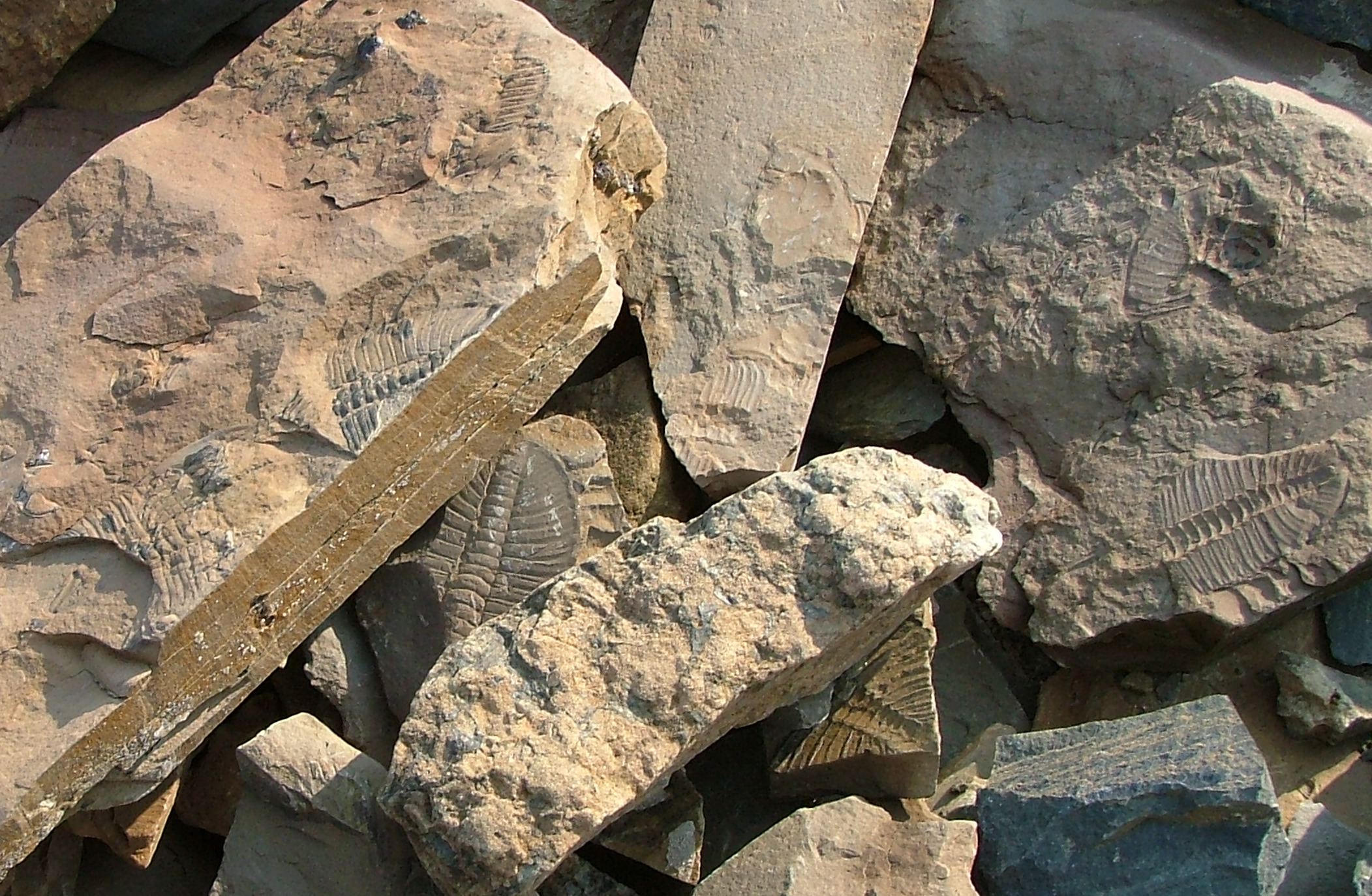
A high density of trilobites are present at the trilobite beds.

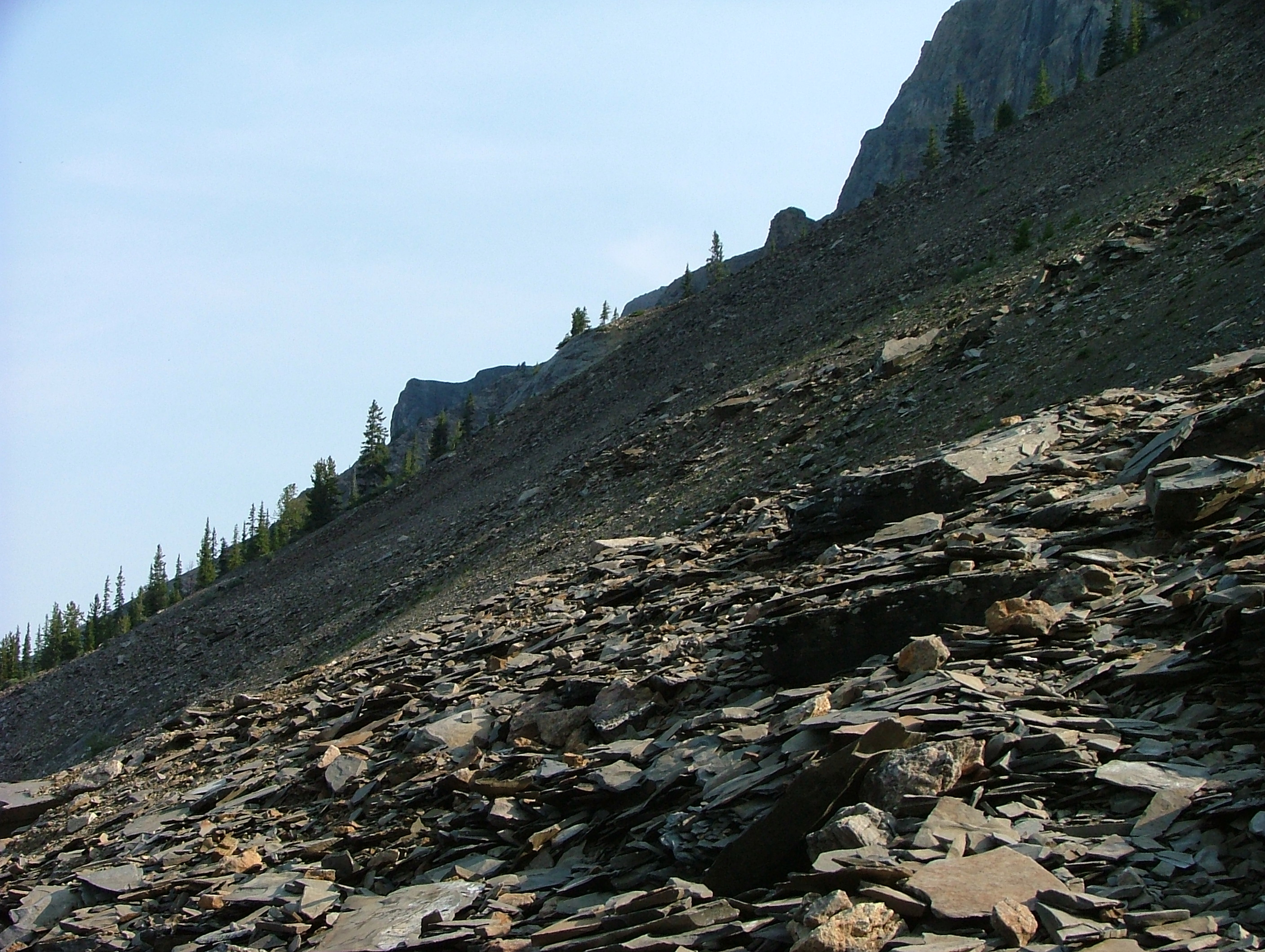
The trilobite beds

The trilobite beds were the first Burgess Shale locality to be discovered.

The richness of fossils in the Field area was first identified by workers associated with the construction of the Trans-Canada railway, which had (somewhat controversially) been routed through the Kicking Horse valley. Richard McConnell, of the Geological Survey of Canada, was pointed to the beds by a railway worker whilst mapping the geology around the railway line in September 1886. Several unusual fossils were subsequently described from this site, including sponges, worms, and the appendages of the unusual Anomalocaris, identified at that time as the bodies of crabs. These fossils prompted Charles Doolittle Walcott to make forays into the area, and led to his discovery of the Walcott Quarry on Fossil Ridge.

== Stratigraphy ==
The trilobite beds are in the Campsite Cliff member, and contain the marker trilobite Ogygopsis.

== Location ==
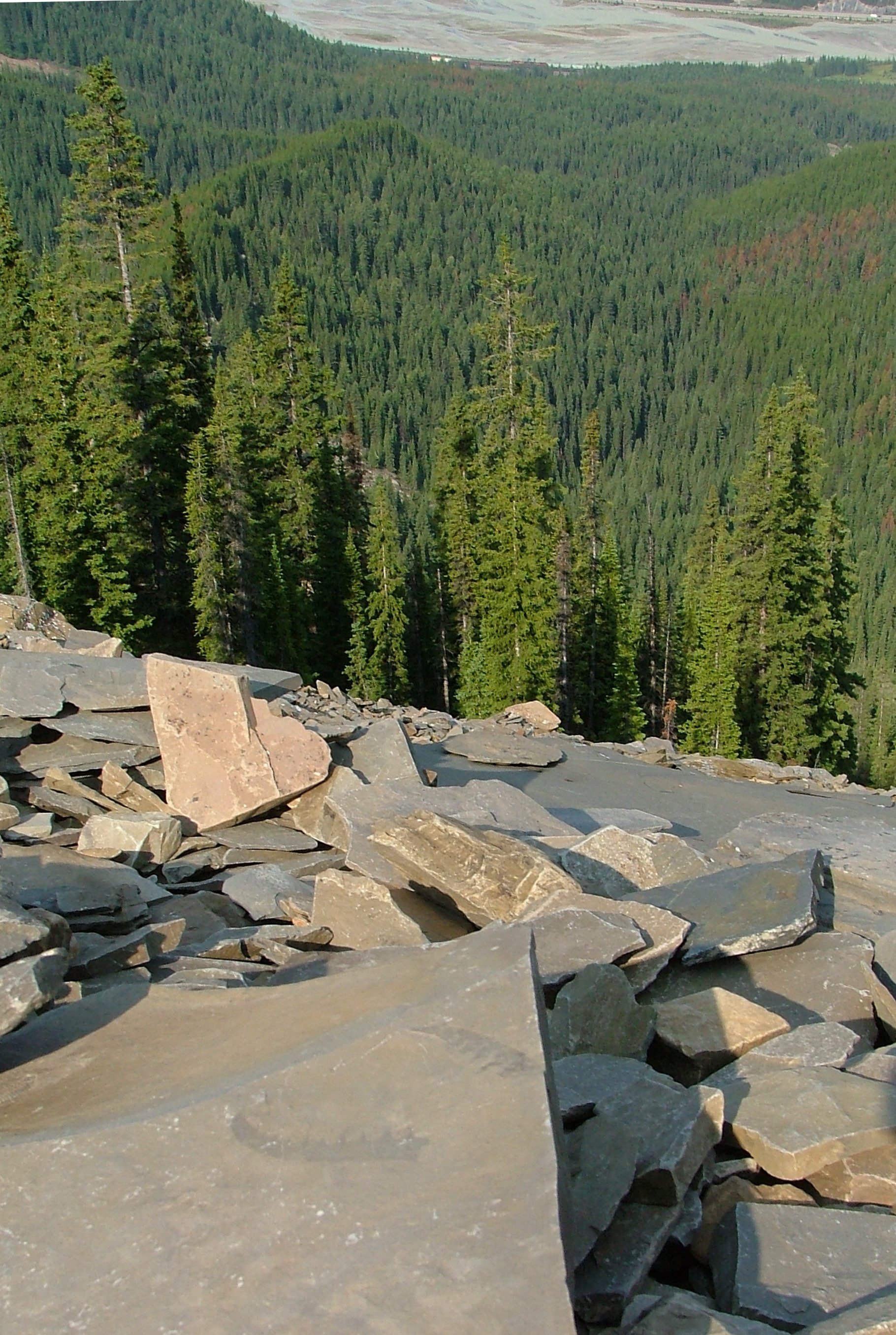
The view from the Mount Stephen trilobite beds, with anomalocaridid claws visible on a slab in the foreground, the Canadian Pacific Railway is visible in the distance.

Map of the Burgess Shale (Stephen Formation), as well as the Mount Whyte Formation. Major Localities within the shale are shown.

The strata are located on Mount Stephen in British Columbia.
