= Carrière des Nerviens Regional Nature Reserve =

Protected area in the Nord-Pas-de-Calais region of France

- IUCN category IV (habitat/species management area)
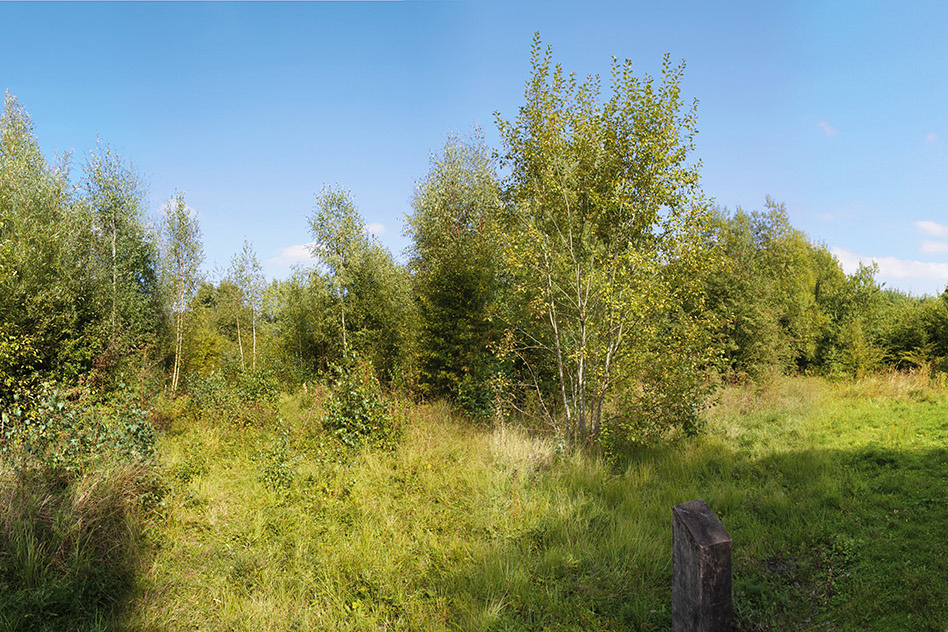

- Location within France
- Location: Bavay, Nord-Pas-de-Calais
- Coordinates: 50°17′54″N 3°46′35″E
- Area: 3.11 hectares (7.7 acres; 0.0120 sq mi)
- Created: May 25, 2009
- Operator: CPIE Bocage de l'Avesnois

The Carrière des Nerviens Regional Nature Reserve (in French Réserve naturelle régionale de la carrière des Nerviens) is a protected area in the Nord-Pas-de-Calais region of northern France. It was established on 25 May 2009 to protect a site containing rare plants and covers just over 3 hectares (7.4 acres). It is located in the municipalities of Bavay and Saint-Waast in the Nord department.

The reserve was created to protect fifteen plants of regional interest and three plant communities listed in the Habitats Directive. Its flora are linked to calcium present in marl. It is located in a transition zone between the oceanic and semi-continental climates and that gives increased biodiversity, with typical species of the atlantic areas and others more continental. The reserve also plays a role in a wildlife corridor.

The site consists of an old quarry of sandstone dated to the Famennian stage in the Late Devonian epoch. It was backfilled in the 1970s with marl. The new soil was re-colonized by pioneer species, which coexist alongside an established afforestation, forming a mosaic of habitats.

CPIE Bocage de l'Avesnois, a non-governmental organization, is the owner and operator of the reserve. The main objective is to maintain the current diversity. To this end, regular management mainly struggles against the afforestation and against invasive species, such as Japanese knot weed. The secondary objectives are environmental education, heritage interpretation, improvement of knowledge fauna and flora, and environmental monitoring.

== Geography ==
=== Location ===
Position of the site (in red) to the west of downtown Bavay

The Carrière des Nerviens Regional Nature Reserve is located in the Arrondissement of Avesnes-sur-Helpe between the cities of Valenciennes and Maubeuge, in the Nord department, Nord-Pas-de-Calais region. It is 1 kilometre (0.62 mi) west of downtown Bavay and 1,700 metres (5,600 ft) south-east of Saint-Waast.

The reserve is triangular in shape. It is bordered to the south by the 942 main road, north-east by an unused railtrack, and to the west by a small path known as Chemin de Rametz. It covers 3.11 hectares (7.7 acres). (Note: The Carrière des Nerviens's site is 4.5 hectares (11 acres). But only the property of the CPIE Bocage de l'Avesnois is classified of the regional nature reserve; the parcels belonging to other owners were not classified.) CPIE Bocage de l'Avesnois owns a parcel of land on the other side of the railtrack. Though not yet included in the reserve, it is expected to be added when the current agreement is renewed.

=== Relief ===
The reserve is located in the valley of the stream Ruisseau de Bavay, with an elevation of between 110 and 115 metres (361 and 377 ft). It has an overall north-south gradient of −5 metres (−16 ft). A mound of accumulated debris, which rises to about 6 metres (20 ft) above the path Chemin de Rametz, is located north-west of the site. After quarrying operations ceased, the quarry was filled mainly with the marl of the Bellignies quarry. The area has since been completely recolonized by vegetation through ecological succession.

=== Hydrology ===
The reserve is located in the valley of the Ruisseau de Bavay, a tributary of the Hogneau, and is part of the greater drainage basin of the Scheldt. The reserve is not in direct contact with the river. It is supplied with water only by precipitation, which is retained by the natural properties of marl.

=== Climate ===
The reserve's nearest weather station is at Cambrai, about 42 kilometres away, inland, to the southeast. However, the nature reserve is affected by the nearby presence of the Ardennes Mountains, which gives a continental influence to the climate.

The regular precipitation and the absence of drought, as well as the predominance of south-southwest winds and rain vectors, show the influence of oceanic climate. However, some significant rainfall variability between seasons, the moderate temperature range, and the high proportion (69.8 percent) of low winds (less than 4 metres per second (13 ft/s)) compared to strong winds (3.2 percent over 8 metres per second (26 ft/s)) winds are typical of a continental influence. This combination is atypical of an altered oceanic climate, a transition zone between the oceanic and semi-continental climates, characterized by mild winters and cool summers.

In the reserve, this climatic transition leads to increased biodiversity. For example, common bluebell (Hyacinthoides non-scripta) is a typical species of the Atlantic areas, while the common butterbur (Petasites hybridus) is more continental.

== History ==
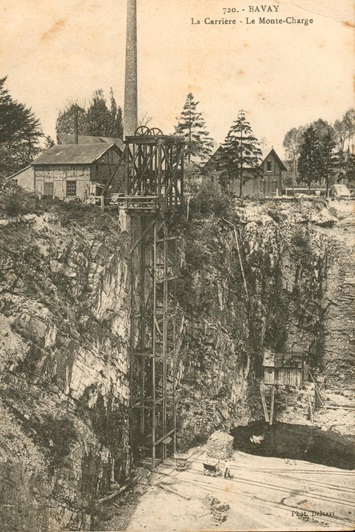
Postcard of the site c. 1900

=== Quarry ===
The site is a former quarry, used for its sandstone deposits as early as the late nineteenth century. (Note: The activity is already attested in 1881: "À 100 mètres du pont du chemin de fer, dans une prairie située en face de l'usine de M. Levent, on exploite les psammites du Condros (...)". However, it seems to be later than 1879 because the same author then wrote: "Le dernier affleurement de psammites visible le long du ruisseau de Bavai, se trouve dans une grande prairie en face de l'usine de M. Levent.") by the Chevallier & Cie company, which employed about 70 workers, including 25 miners. In 1909, the annual production was 12,000 cubic metres (420,000 cu ft) of macadam, 500 cubic metres (18,000 cu ft) of ballast and 25,000 cubic metres (880,000 cu ft) of cobblestones.

Boreholes were drilled manually. Stone blocks were divided using a mass and a steel heavy hammer (up to 14 kilograms (31 lb)) called refenderesse. Stones obtained were then classified by eye into stone for cobble and rubble for macadam. The first were épincés: asperities were removed by épinceurs to form regular cobblestones. They were then sorted by size. The rubble was crushed in a jaw crusher. Debris were mechanically separated according to their size. Each particle has a particular use. Macadam, made of stones between 2 and 8 centimetres (0.79 and 3.15 in), was used for the construction and maintenance of roads. Ballast is a gravel 10 to 20 millimetres (0.39 to 0.79 in) used for concrete. Shot from 2 to 10 millimetres (0.079 to 0.394 in) was used for the surface of concrete or paths in parks and gardens. The fine dust, from 0 to 2 millimetres (0.000 to 0.079 in), was used for concrete paver blocks, concrete pipes, etc. (Note: The Association française pour l'avancement des sciences wrote that in the Bavay quarry ""Le travail est le même qu'à Watissart et les matériaux extraits sont identiques et classés de la même façon", the work is the same and extracted materials are identical and classified in the same way as at the Watissart quarry located in Jeumont.)

Quarrying ceased in the early 1960s (1962–1965), when the stones extracted were no longer of sufficient quality. Between 1971 and 1978, the quarry was gradually filled with marl from the Bellignies quarry. Since then, the site has been completely recolonized by vegetation through ecological succession, forming tree, shrub and herb layers.

=== Reserve ===
Physical boundaries of the reserve

In 2001, the site was brought to the attention of the CPIE Bocage de l'Avesnois, pointing out the biodiversity of the new plant life. The association performed the first inventories. In the meantime, she contacted the five owners to consider a land management proposal. The commune of Bavay, the Bellignies quarry (SECAB) and a third owner sold her the property in 2003. The CPIE Bocage de l'Avesnois became the owner / operator of 85 percent of the site. The association implemented the first environmental resources management actions at the site and developed its first environmental management scheme (Note: In France, an environmental management scheme is defined by the Code de l'environnement (article R332-43). A scientific council must validate it to obtain or maintain the accreditation.) In 2009, the association obtained the agreement establishing the regional nature reserve at the site for a period of 20 years.

The name of the reserve recalls the former industrial activity (Carrière: quarry) and the Gallo-Roman history of Bavay, the capital city of the ancient Nervii tribe.

In 2015, another owner give the management of his parcel.

== Geology ==
The Paleozoic folded outcrops of the Bavay-Saint-Waast area are the bedrock of the eastern flank of the Mélantois' anticline, where the transgressive Cretaceous (Turonian and Cenomanian chalk) thins, and may eventually disappear by erosion. Strata of Hercynian basement, raised in the East by an important structural horst-type accident, then appear locally. In these Paleozoic strata, the Devonian presents as a sandstone base of the Lower Famennian, where the levels were quarried (Note: These quarried rocks are no longer visible on the site, as they were fully covered by embankments.)

=== Formations ===
==== Quarried level ====
The stone that was quarried is arkose (Note: Some geologists also call those sandstones psammite) of the Famennian stage. Approximately 360 million years ago, the thrust of forming Gondwana plates raised the seabed. Meanwhile, an ice age occurred in regions near the poles. Marine regression allowed sedimentation of detrital sand and clays which left large shoals of hard sandstone with ripple marks, alternating with levels more or less shaley according to their clay's content.

At the base of the deposit, these sandstones are reddish brown, very micaceous and shaley, sometimes containing calcareous nodules, ferruginous concretions and vegetable wax; above, they are gray and quartziferous. This is the Aye formation, including spiriferida like Cyrtospirifer verneuili, Rhynchonellida as Rhynchonella pugnus and R. boloniensis, some Orthoceras, Orthis striatula or Atrypa reticularis Well-preserved feldspar and mica probably come from wind erosion under a semi-arid climate of mountains present in the Netherlands today and extending to Düsseldorf.

==== Lower level ====
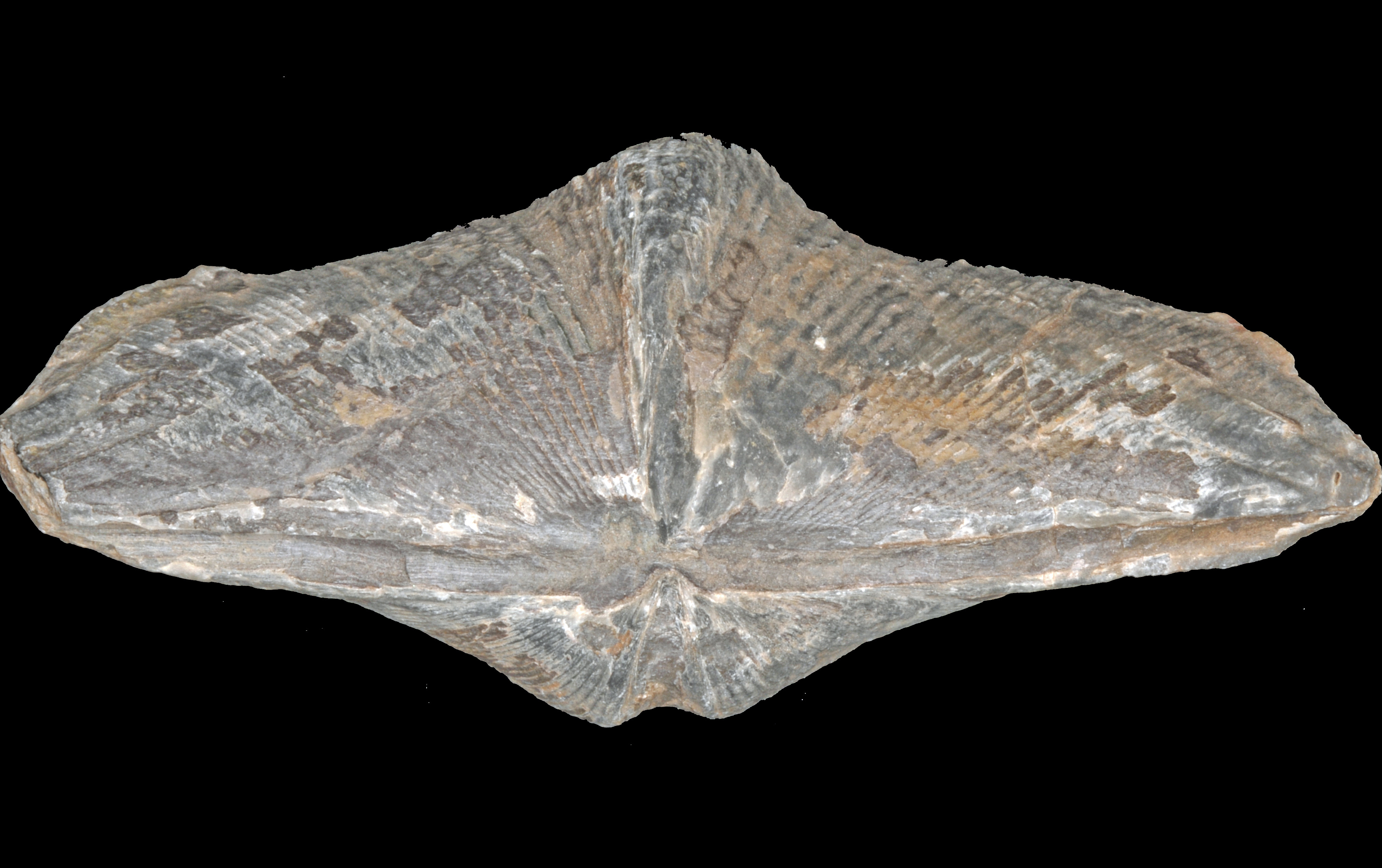
Cyrtospirifer verneuili is an extinct brachiopod, fossilized in the reserve.

Under the Famennian, the Frasnian consists, from top to bottom, of nodular gray shale, and mica rich in fossils such as Cyrtospirifer verneuili, Spirigera concentrica, Atrypa reticularis, Orthis striatula, Productus subaculeatus, and Acervularia pentagona. Below this are gray limestone-built beds, rich in corals such as Phacellophyllum caespitosum, Thamnopora boloniensis, alternating with black shale and nodular limestone containing Cyrtospirifer verneuilli and Phacellophyllum caespitosum. These beds issue from siltation of the biostromes present in the Frasnian epoch, 370 million years ago.

==== Upper levels ====
Those Famennian strata represent the top of the Paleozoic series pleated with north dipping. Above, the transgressive Upper Cretaceous overlies horizontally with unconformity. It includes from the bottom to the top a paleozoic boulder conglomerate mixed with a sandy and glauconitic marl matrix, coarse clayey and glauconitic sands, containing Chlamys asper, Ostrea diluviana, Praeactinocamax plenus and finally marl with Terebratulina gracilis. These strata belong to the Cenomanian-Turonian and were deposited between 90 and 100 million years ago, during a transgressive phase.

Fifty million years ago, during the Ypresian age, locally called Landenian, forms of marl of the Porquerie are found. It comes from the alteration of Cretaceous rocks and takes the form of a brown or greenish plastic clay without fossils. The flints normally present at the base of the deposit have not been reported by Ladrière 1881.

This stratum is covered with silt composed of clay, sand and flints and Roman pottery pieces, of the late Neogene age. Its origin can be attributed to the alteration of the underlying rocks and wind erosion.

=== Nature of the embankments ===
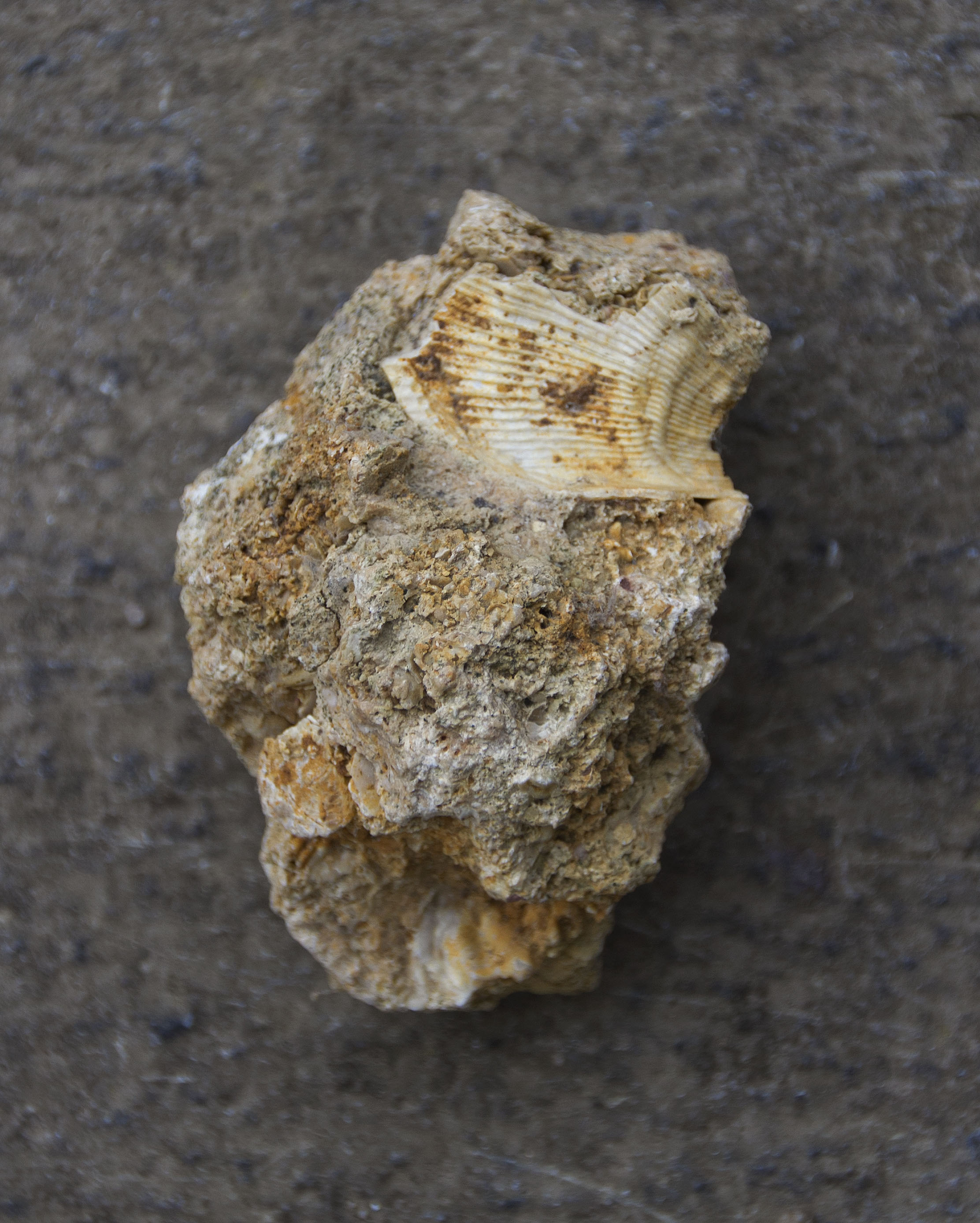
Sarrasin de Bettrechies : a shelly limestone

The stones used to backfill the quarry are those which underlie the Givetian limestone extracted in the Bellignies quarry. There is Sarrasin de Bettrechies, a coarse shelly limestone, deep gray, yellowish when it outcrops, detrital ferruginous dated to the Lower Cenomanian epoch, a hundred million years ago. There is clay and very glauconitic marl of the Upper Cenomanian stage, enriched by a pebble conglomerate paléozoïc stones. These rocks contain Praeactinocamax plenus, Chlamys asper, Ostrea diluviana and radiated fossils: Janira quadricostata, Cyprina ligeriensis, Arca mailleana. There is also bluish marl of the Turonian.

== Ecology ==
=== Plant communities ===
Map of habitats in the reserve

The site is characterized by a mosaic of 17 plant communities regrouped into three main types of ecological units: (Note: The ecological units have been classified by Phytosociology.) grassy open areas, shrubby areas and wooded areas. Of these, three are listed in the Habitats Directive. The calcareous rocky slopes with chasmophytic vegetation Cystopterido fragilis-Asplenietum scolopendrii are considered as exceptional, with a degree of uncertainty in the Nord-Pas-de-Calais region. Hydrophilous tall herb fringe community with Petasites hybridus, at the limit of its range, is also exceptional. The herbaceous fringe with red campion (Silene dioica) et wood forget-me-not (Myosotis sylvatica) (Sileno dioicae - Myosotidetum sylvaticae) is very rare in the Nord-Pas-de-Calais. The wood-fringe Lathyro sylvestris – Astragaletum glycyphylli is also regionally interesting.

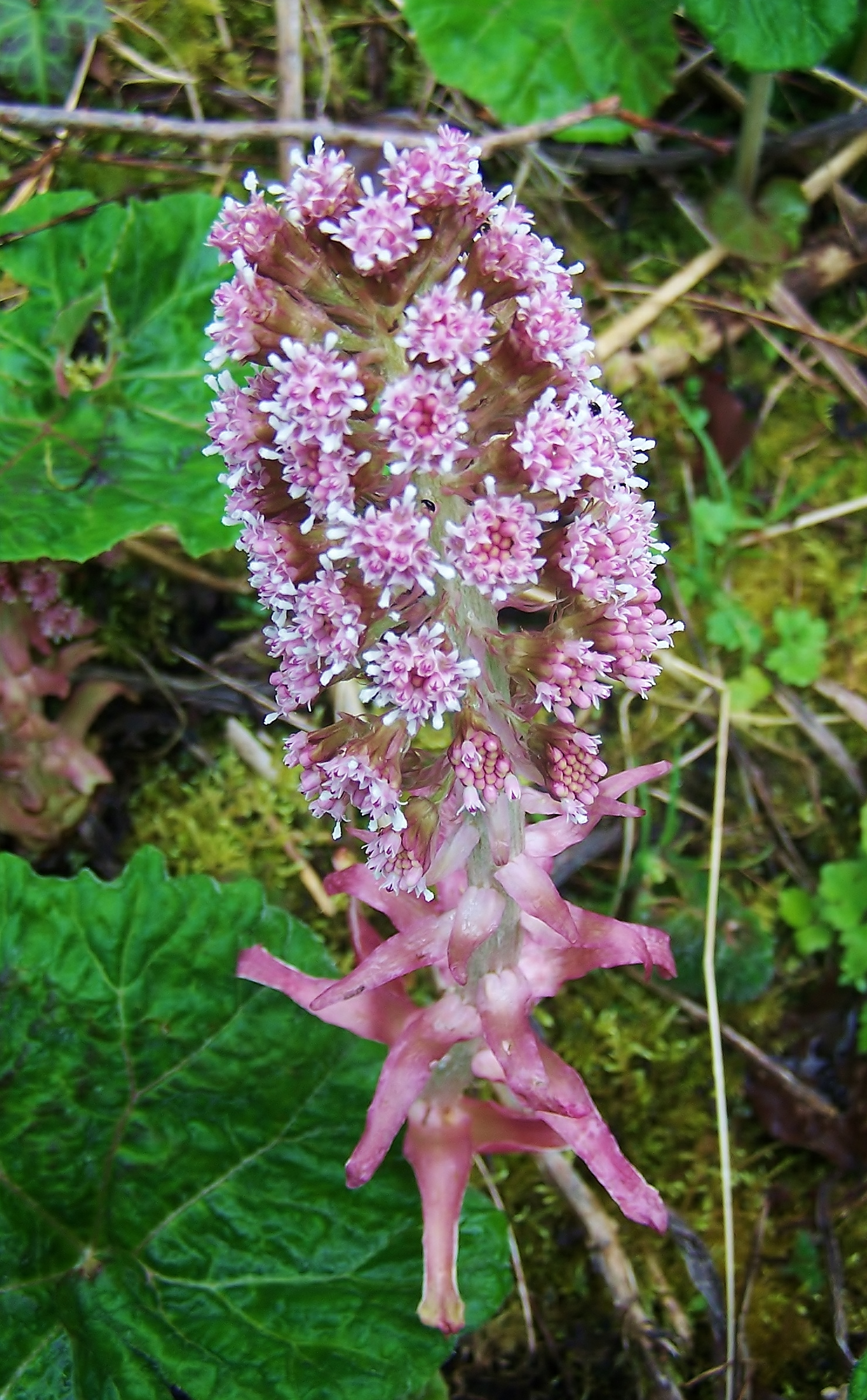
Common butterbur

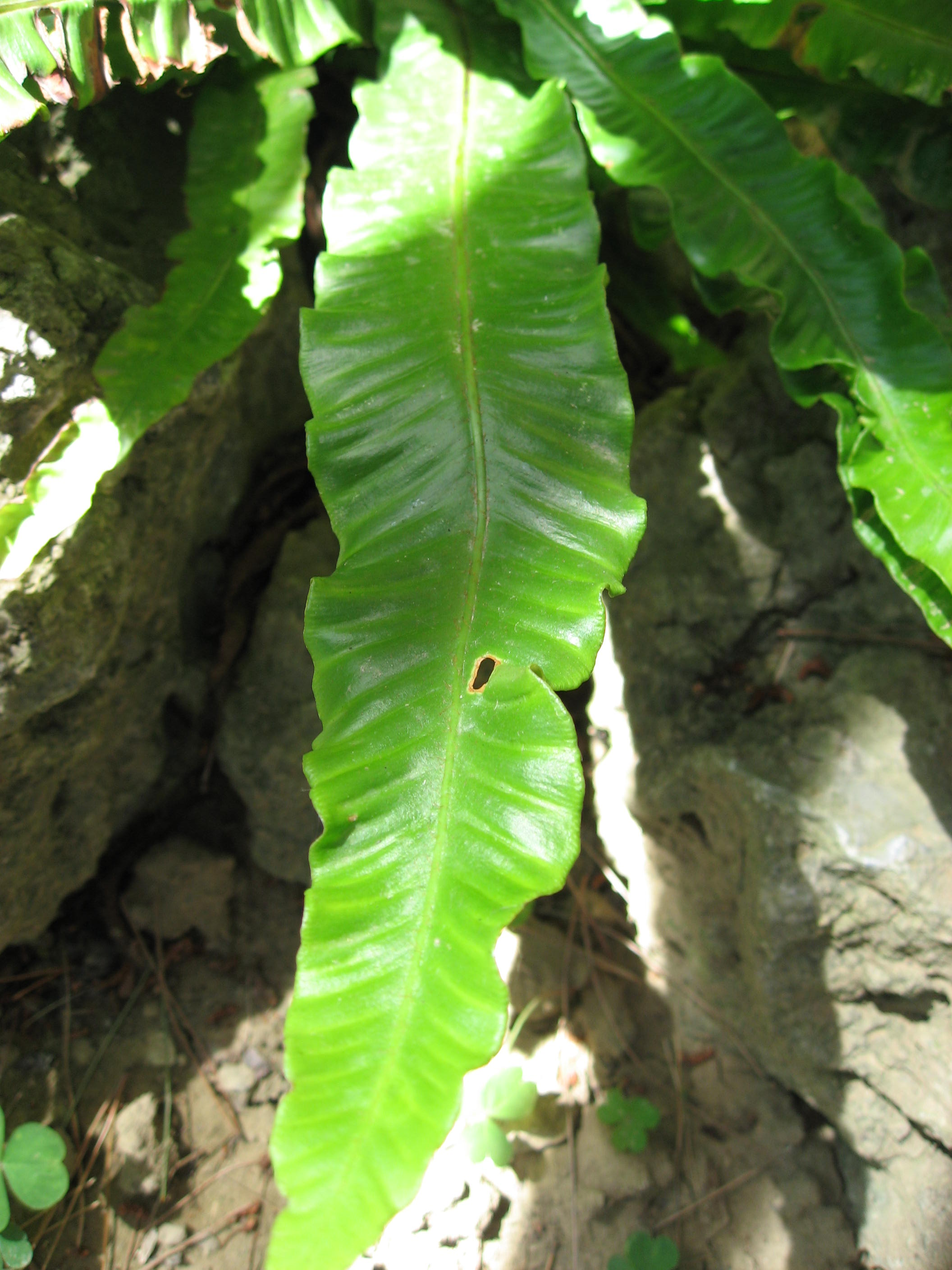
hart's-tongue fern

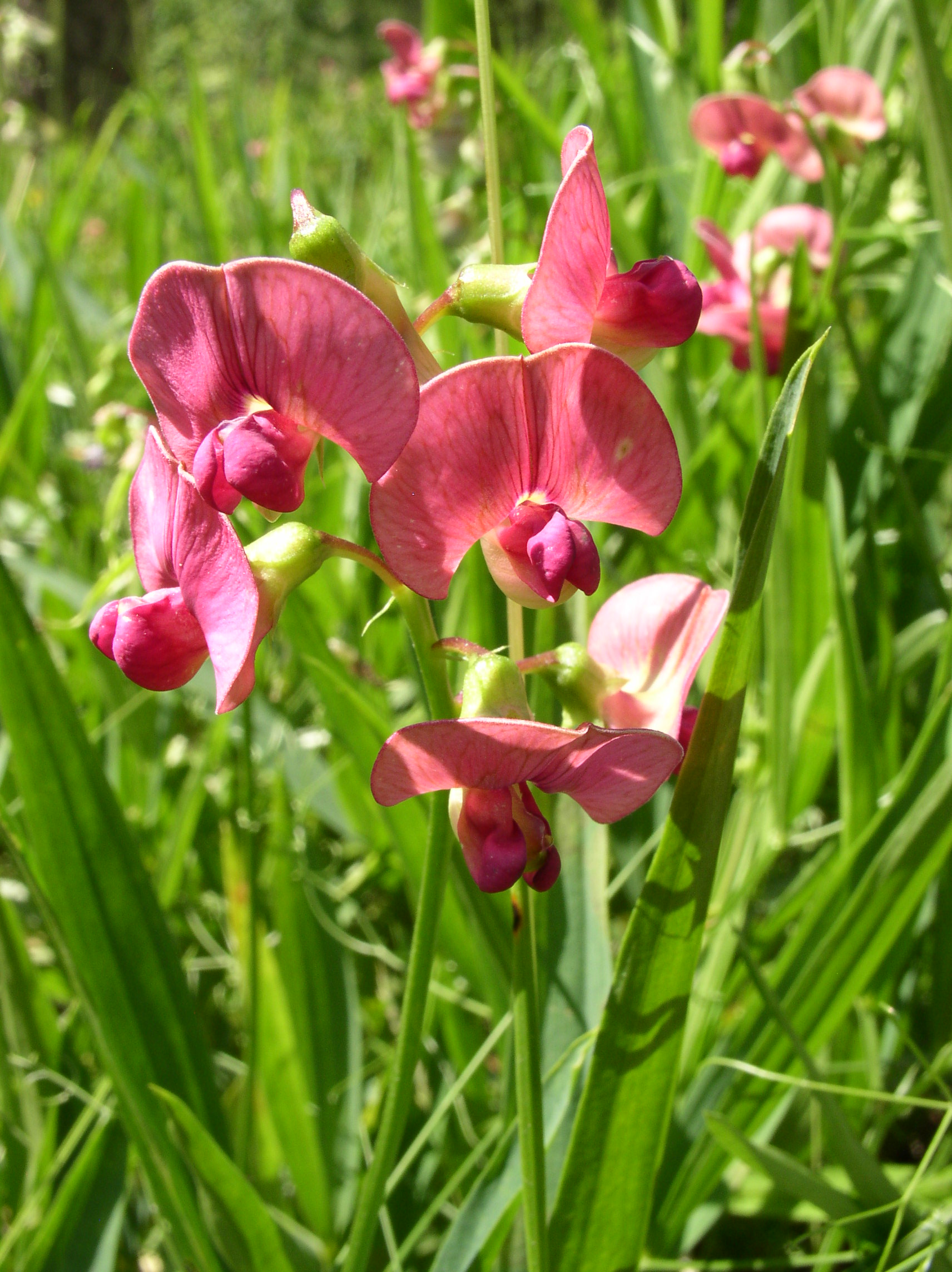
narrow-leaved everlasting-pea

=== Flora ===
==== Vascular plants ====
The reserve has 171 plant species, and 15 of them have heritage interest. (Note: The heritage value of the plants is defined by the inventory of the vascular flora of the Nord-Pas de Calais)

Twelve of them were inventoried in 2003, and their populations have been managed since. The light undergrowth contains common spotted orchid (Dactylorhiza fuchsii) and round-leaved wintergreen (Pyrola rotundifolia). Liquorice milkvetch (Astragalus glycyphyllos) and narrow-leaved everlasting-pea (Lathyrus sylvestris) are present in the small herb glade. The population of lesser butterfly-orchid (Platanthera bifolia) is located in the pioneer wood. In the glade with Calamagrostide and at the boundary of a pioneer grove grow pyramidal orchid (Anacamptis pyramidalis). (Note: The lizard orchid (Himantoglossum hircinum) has not been seen in the reserve since 2003.) bee orchid (Ophrys apifera) and man orchid (Orchis anthropophora) grow everywhere, except in the older glade. In the different herbaceous fringes grow wood forget-me-not (Myosotis sylvatica) and zigzag clover (Trifolium medium). A tall herb fringe hosts common butterbur (Petasites hybridus).

Seven plants are protected by a regional scale: common spotted orchid, man orchid, bee orchid, zigzag clover, liquorice milkvetch, narrow-leaved everlasting-pea and wood forget-me-not.

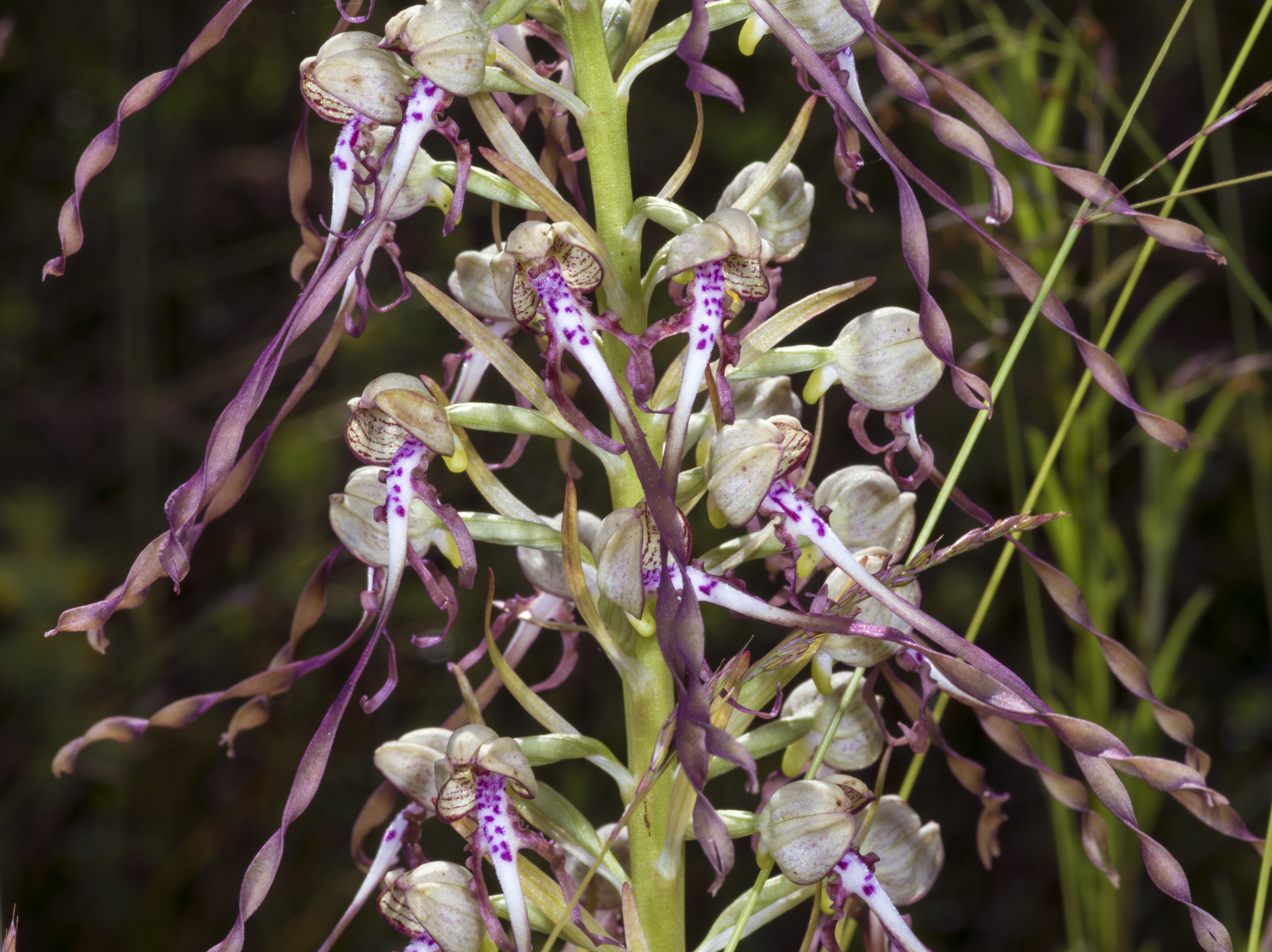
Lizard orchid

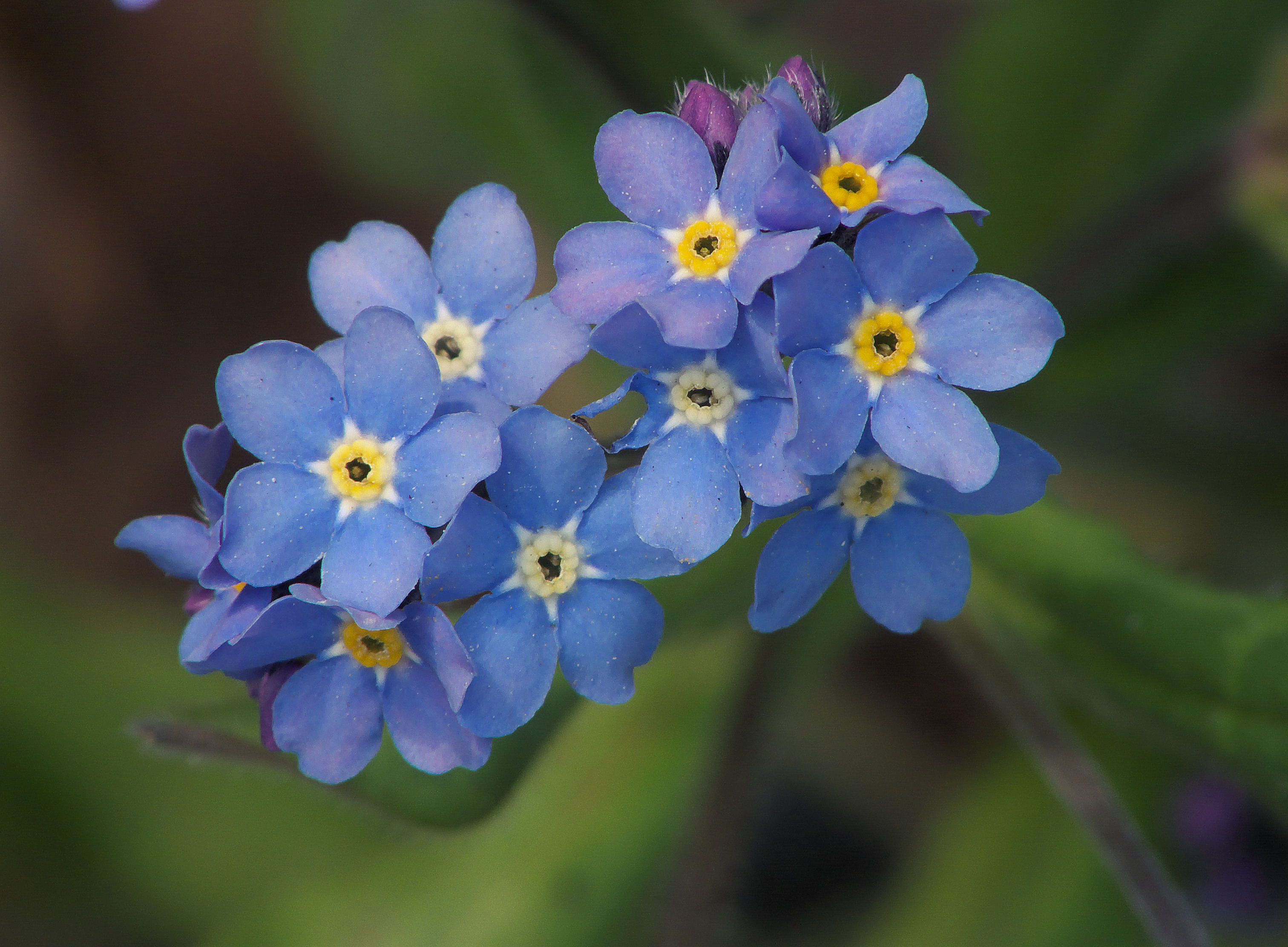
Wood forget-me-not

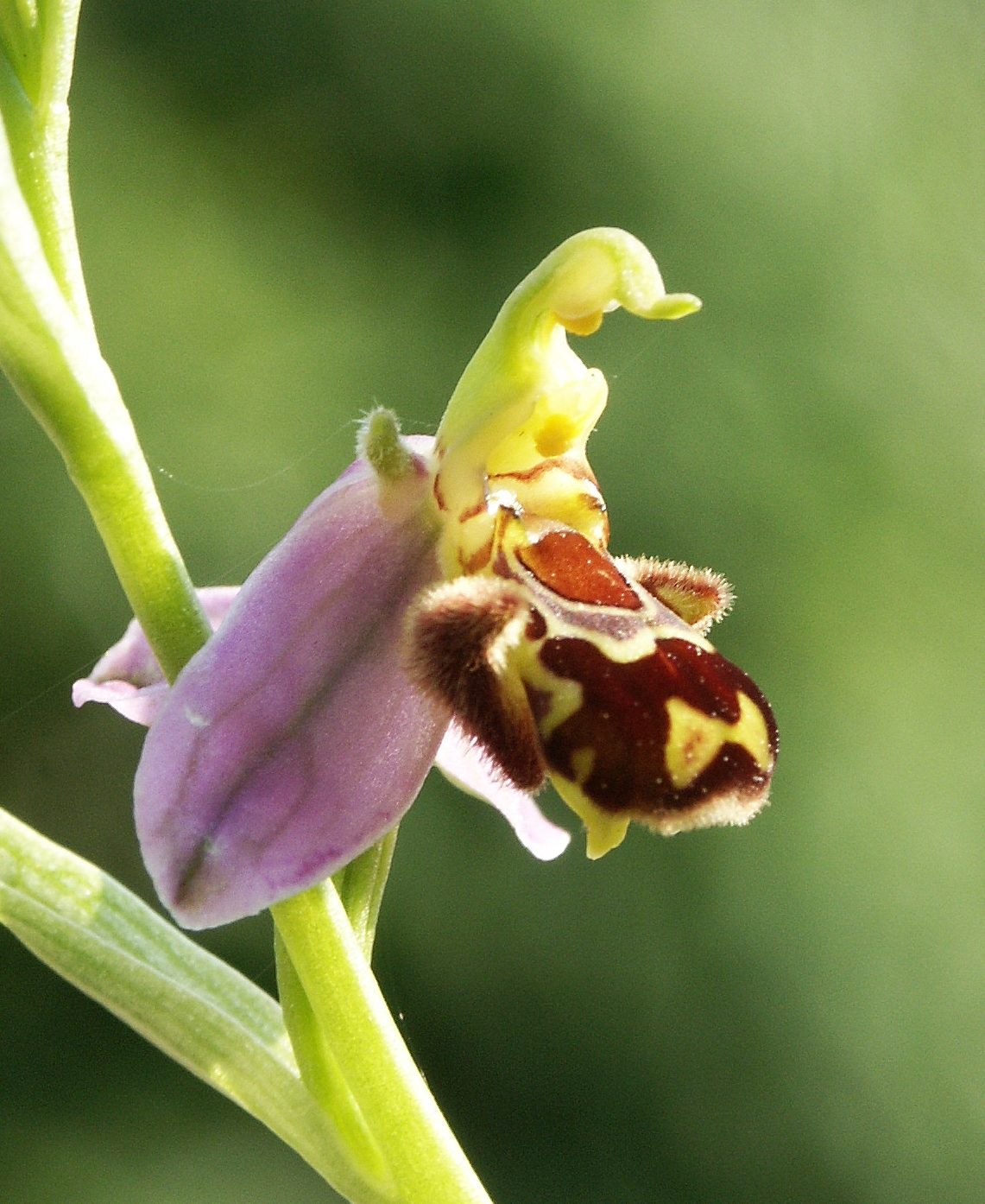
Bee orchid

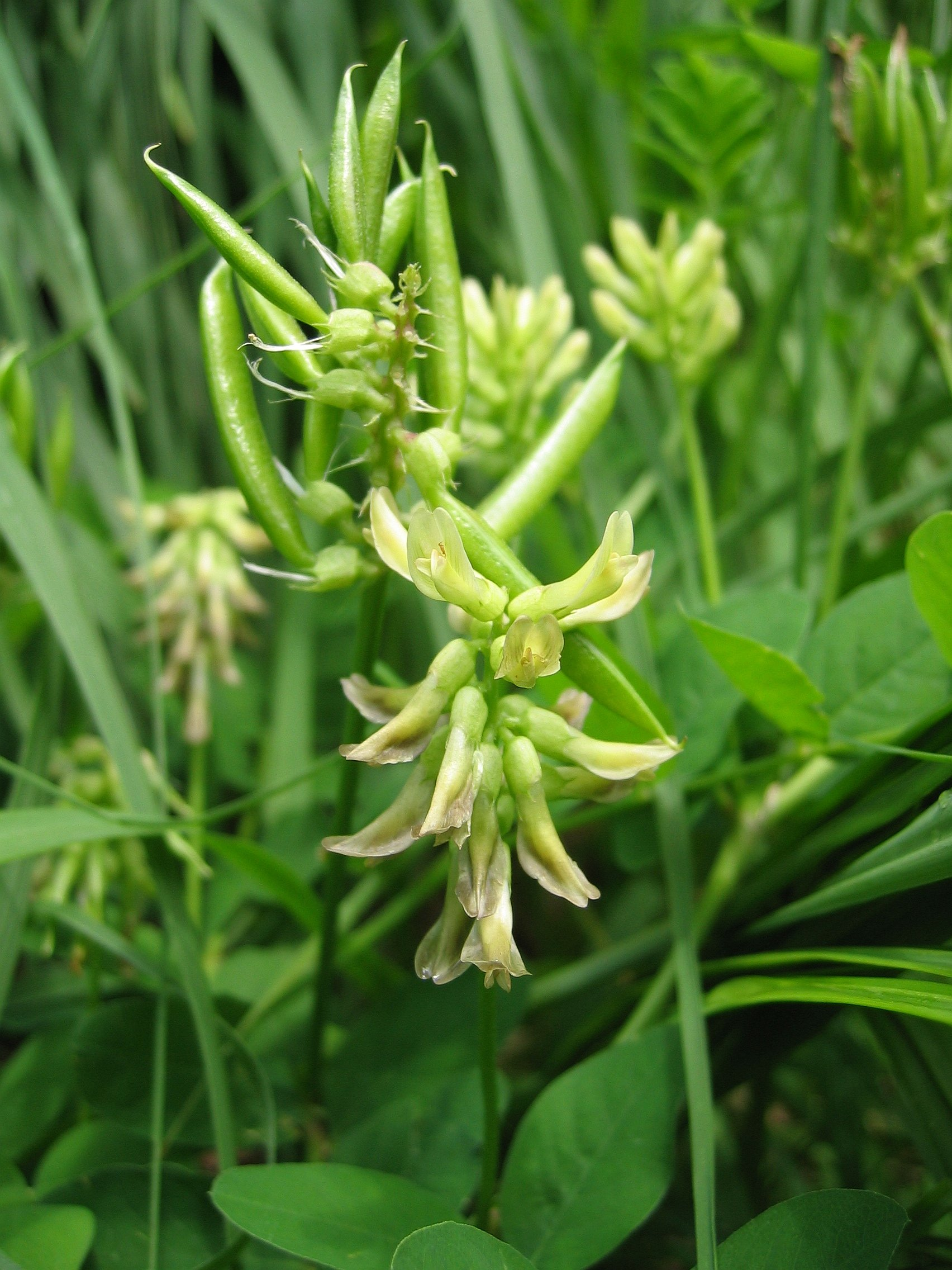
Liquorice milkvetch

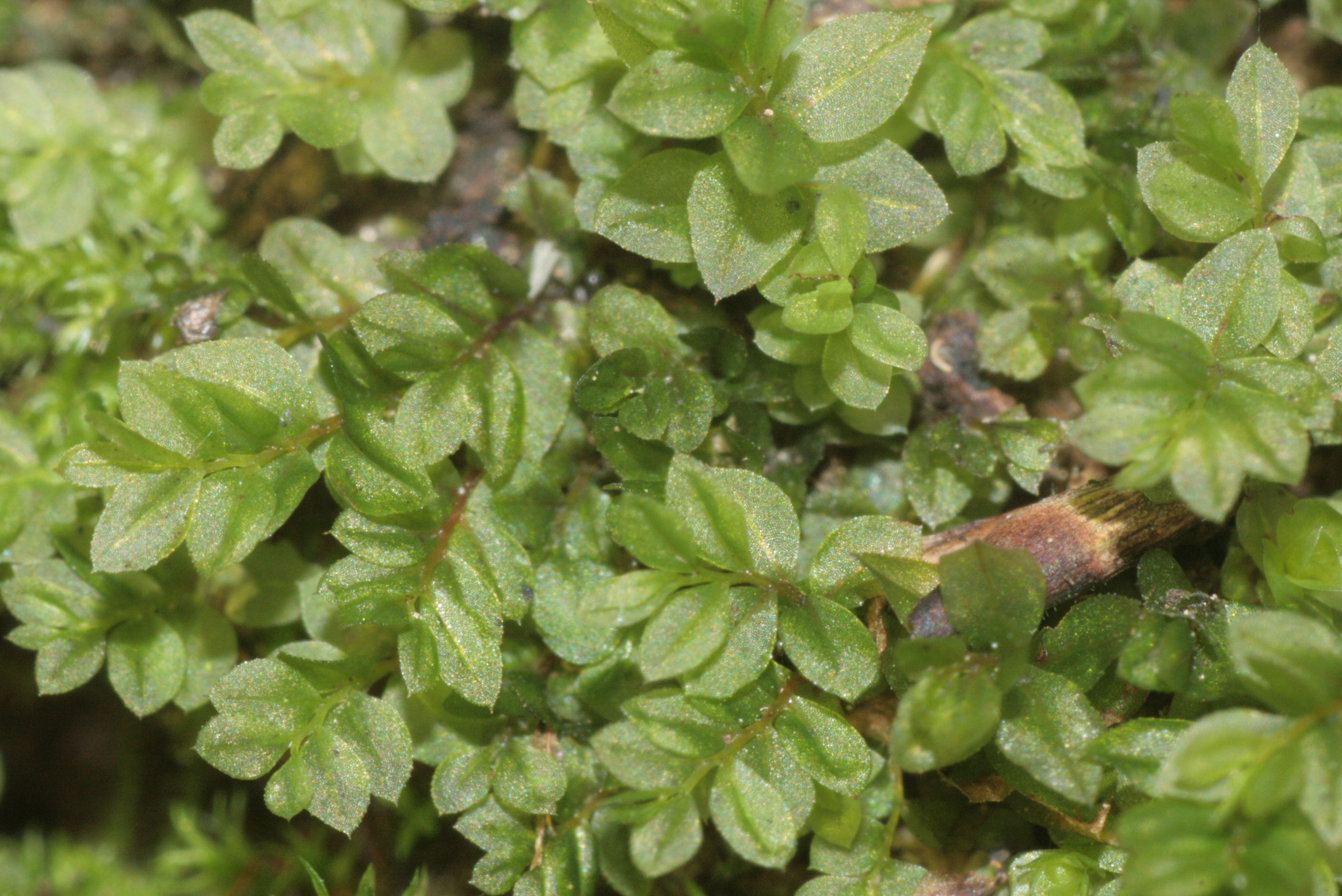
Stellar calcareous moss

==== Mosses ====
In 2012, 43 species of bryophytes were inventoried, including Stellar calcareous moss (Mnium stellare), taxon considered as endangered on the Nord-Pas-de-Calais red regional list of bryophytes.

=== Mushrooms ===
Among the 115 species recorded in 2004 on the site, 15 are included in the red list of the Nord-Pas-de-Calais region. (Note: The Regional Red List was established by Régis Courtecuisse in 1997 and published in Cryptogamie, Mycologie, 18, no 3, pp. 183–219 ISSN 0181-1584) In the shrubs near the path where green waste was deposited by people from outside the organization grow yellow club fungus (Clavulinopsis helvola), gray shag (Coprinopsis cinerea), black earth tongues (Trichoglossum hirsutum), (Note: Trichoglossum hirsutum is vulnerable in the Regional Red List. This species likes moist and mossy grassy places.) Arrhenia spathulata and Marasmius limosus. Those two last species are also in the Calamagrostide's glade of a pioneer wood of willow and birch, with moor club (Clavaria argillacea), Geoglossum cookeanum, lilac leg fibrecap (Inocybe griseolilacina), (Stropharia pseudocyanea), girdled knight (Tricholoma cingulatum) and burnt knight (Tricholoma ustale). Near orchid stations in the pioneer wood exist golden spindles (Clavulinopsis fusiformis), Hebeloma clavulipes, (Note: Hebeloma clavulipes was identified for the first time in the Nord-Pas-de-Calais region. It was therefore not included in the Red List of 1997. It is an extomycorhizic species of willows in the reserve.) Hebeloma fusipes, Hebeloma pusillum, and also lilac leg fibrecap and burnt knight. Dog stinkhorn (Mutinus caninus) and Scytinostroma hemidichophyticum for their part, were observed in the shaded path north of the site on the edge of mature wood.

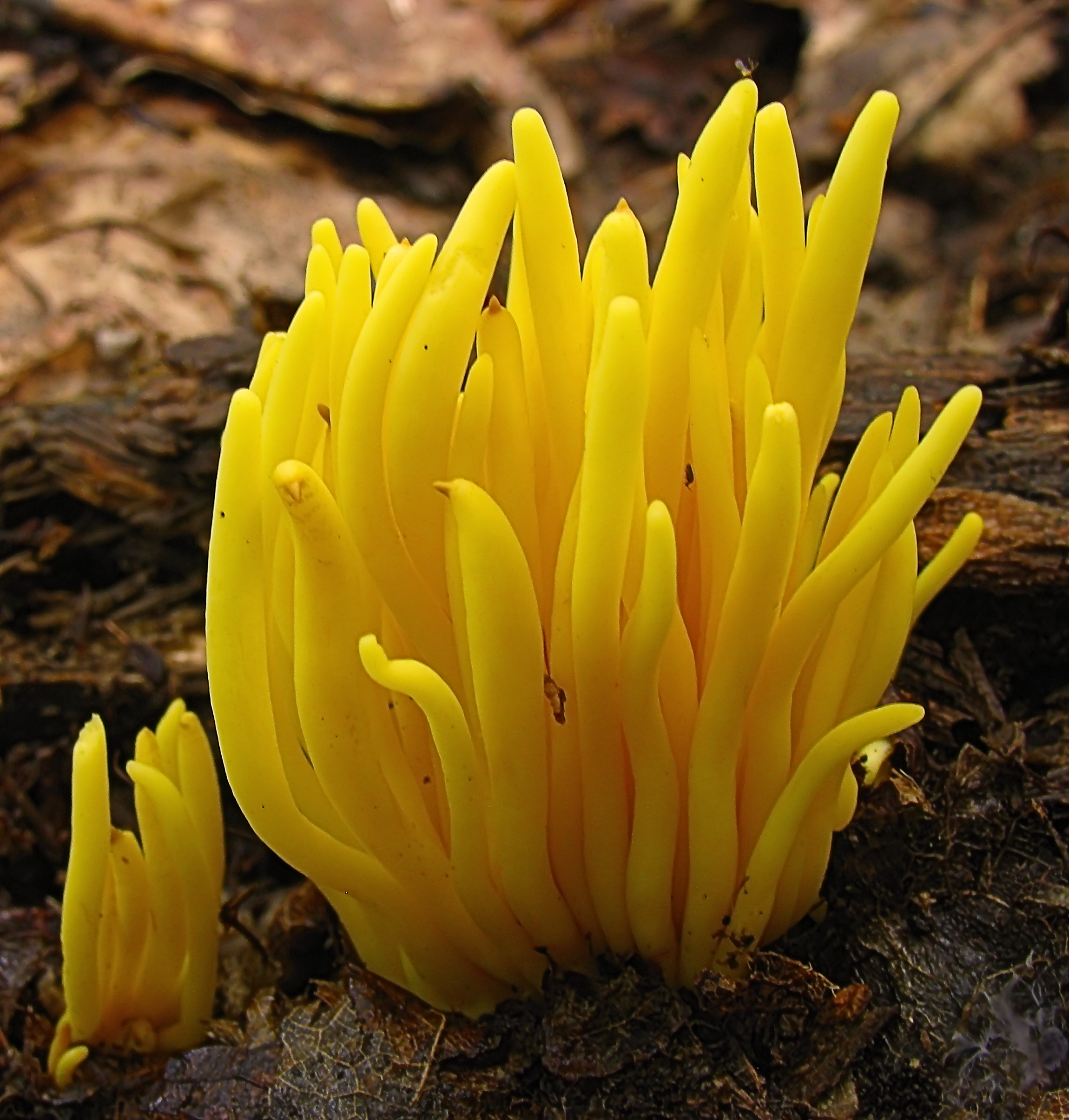
Golden spindles

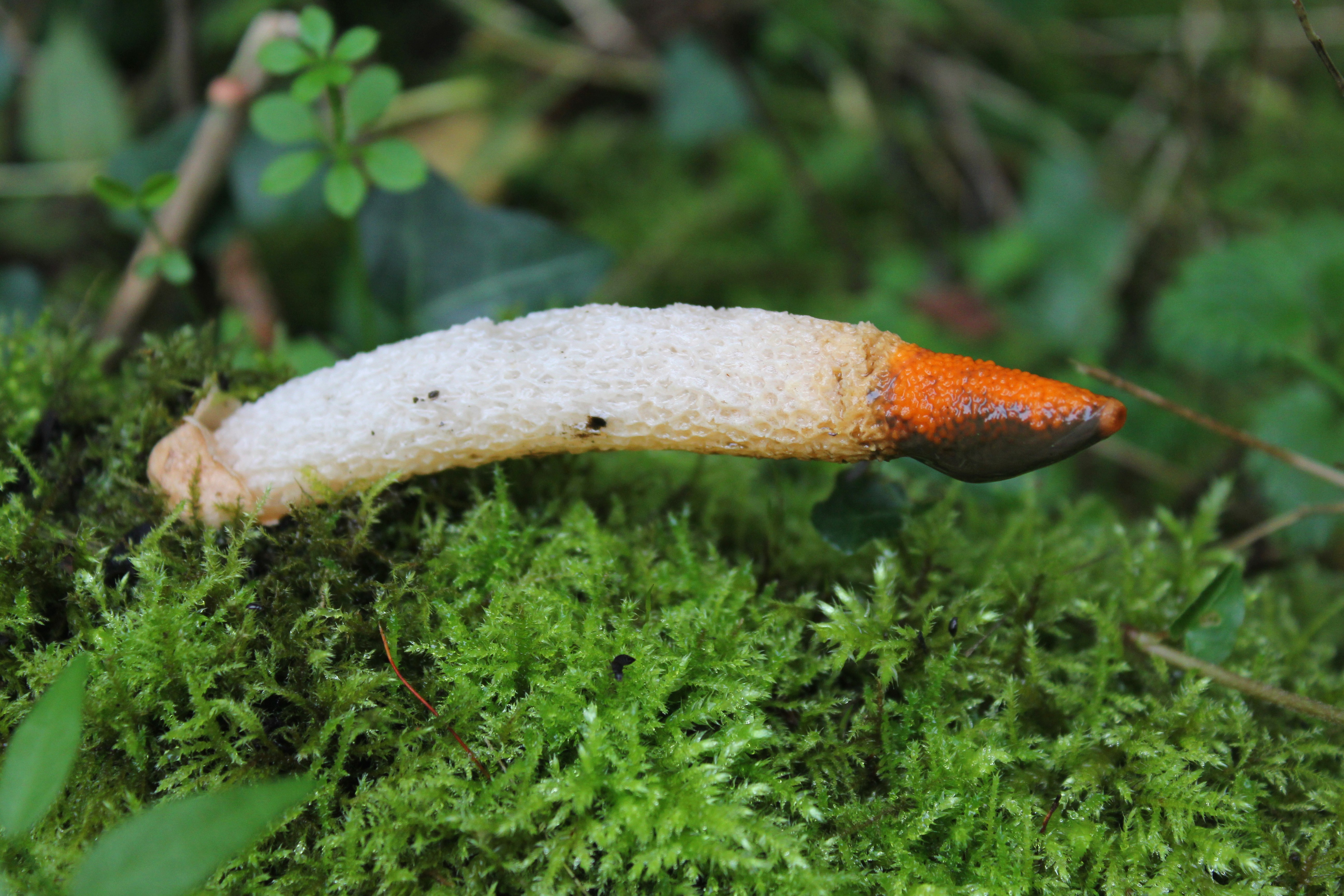
Dog stinkhorn

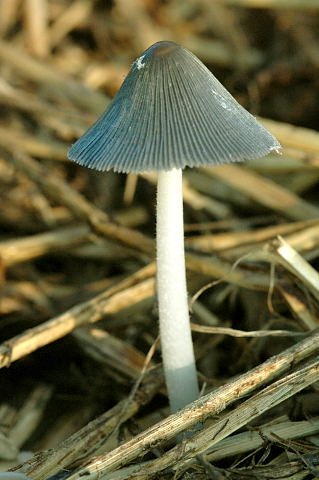
Gray shag

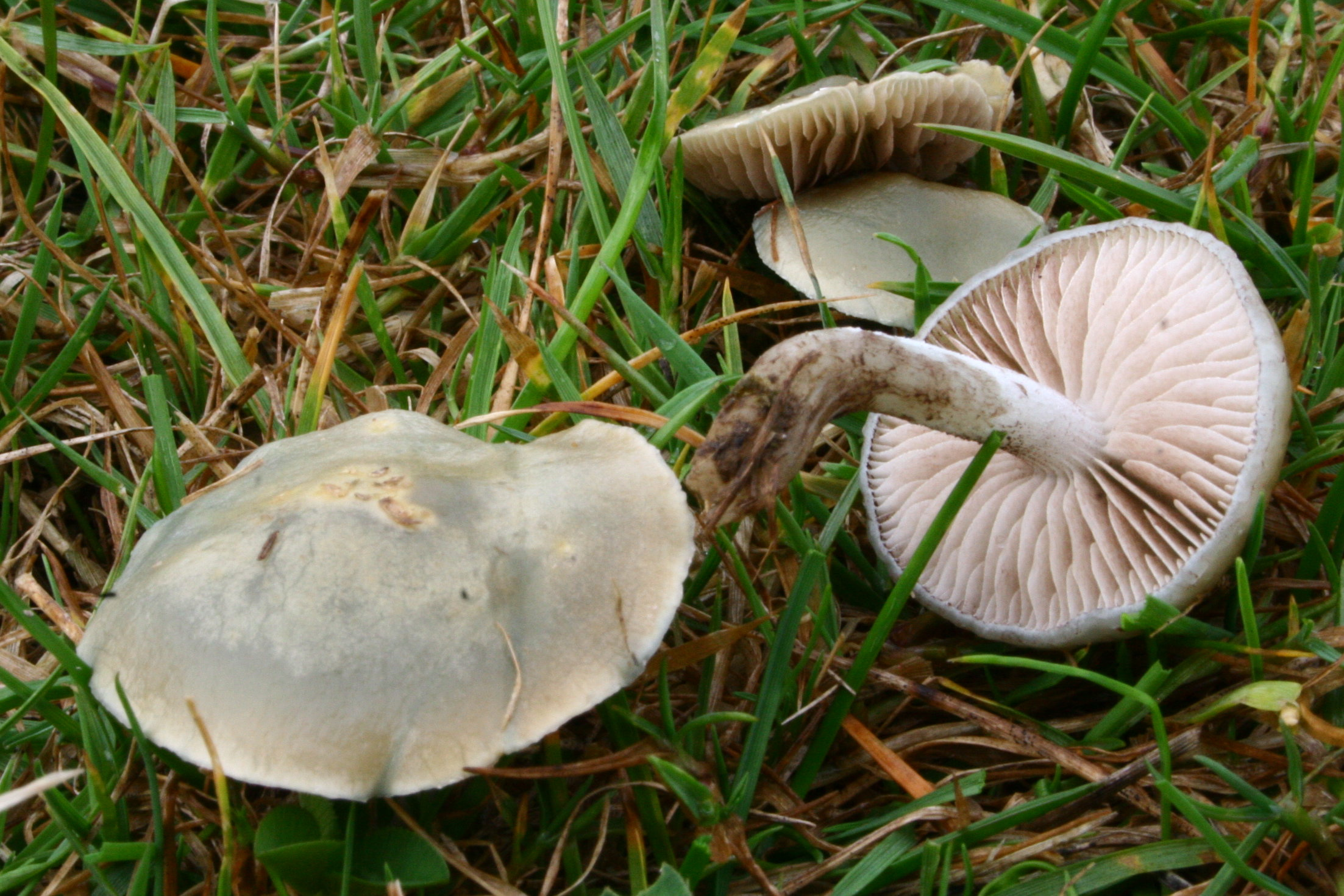
Stropharia pseudocyanea

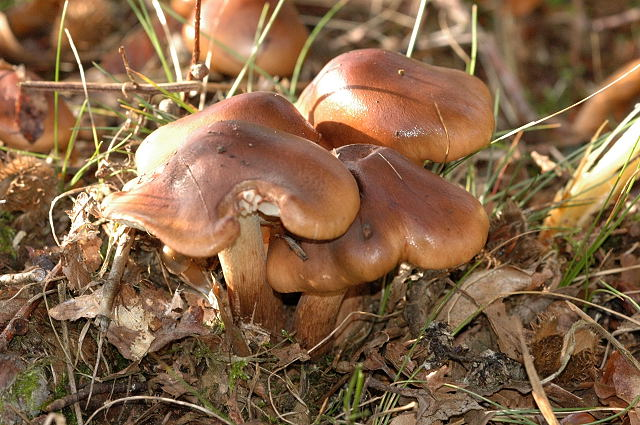
Burnt knight

=== Fauna ===
==== Mammals ====
Common mammals found here include the red fox, red squirrel, hare and rabbit, mole, wood mouse, bank vole and field vole. Two species of bats frequent the site regularly to hunt: the Daubenton's bat (Myotis daubentonii) and common pipistrelle (Pipistrellus pipistrellus). They cannot, however, establish their habitat due to the lack of roosting sites in the reserve's young trees.

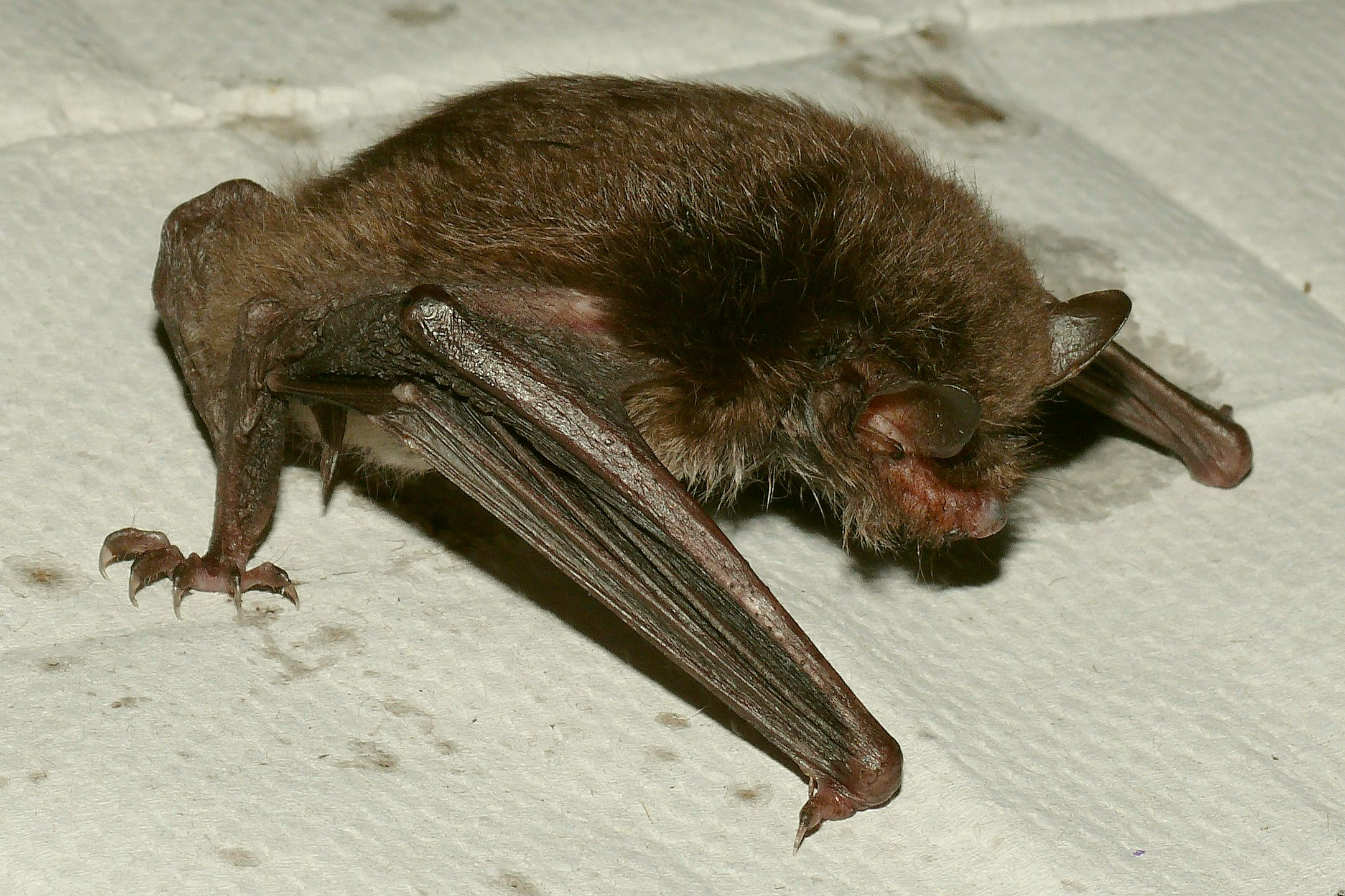
Daubenton's bat

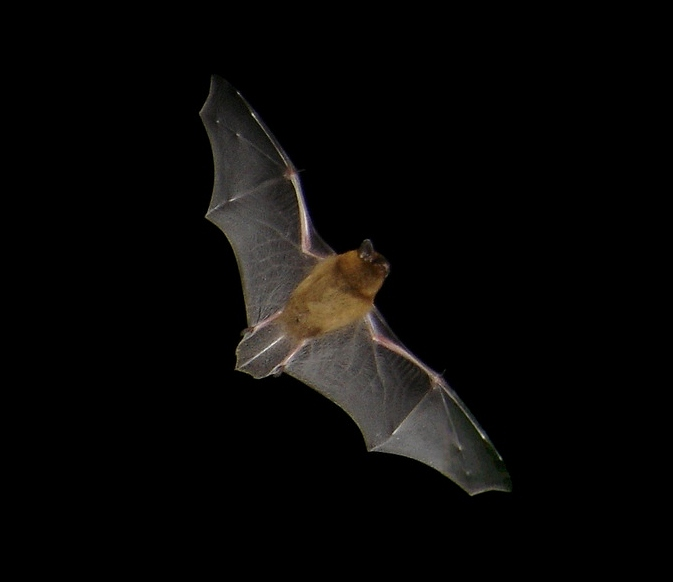
Common pipistrelle

==== Birds ====
Forty-two species of birds have been observed on the site, 25 of which are breeding there. Twenty-two species are protected nationally; five are listed on the annex OO of the Bonn Convention, which aims to conserve migratory species throughout their range. However, no species can be considered as heritage. The northern goshawk and Eurasian sparrowhawk benefit from the abundance of sparrows feeding. The common grasshopper warbler stops there during its migration and the common nightingale nests there occasionally.

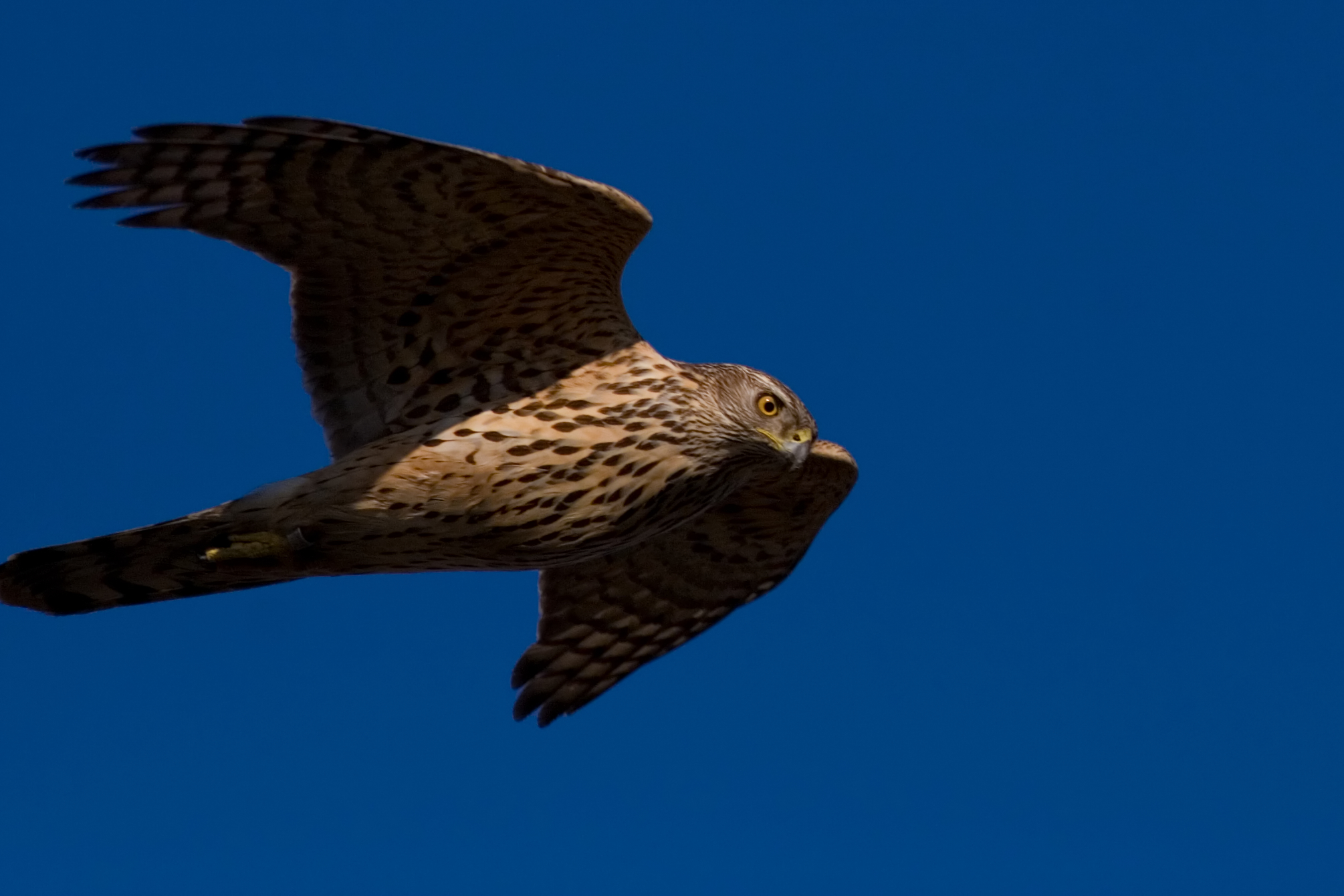
Northern goshawk

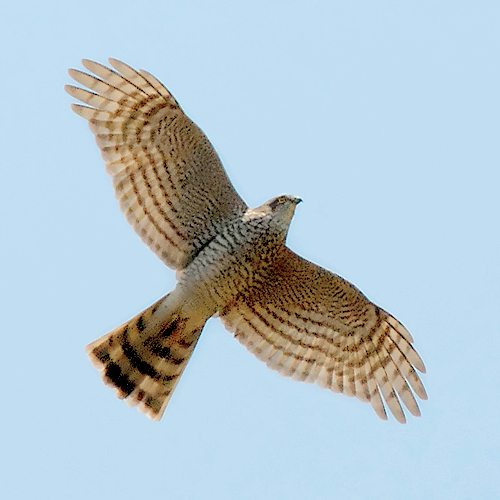
Eurasian sparrowhawk

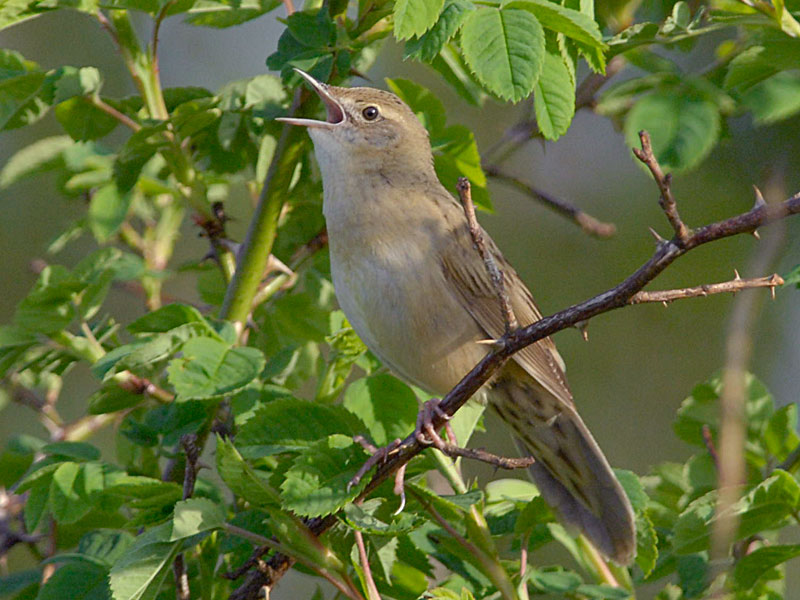
Common grasshopper warbler

==== Reptiles and amphibians ====
The common toad (Bufo bufo) and the common frog (Rana temporaria) are the only amphibians on the site. They use it in winter or during their migration. The viviparous lizard (Zootoca vivipara) likes the slate deposits and ballast of the track. It hunts in the herbaceous areas, very flowery in summer and high in insects. The common wall lizard (Podarcis muralis) has been seen in 2013. The slowworm reproduction (Anguis fragilis) is attested by the observation of young under rocks and other debris.

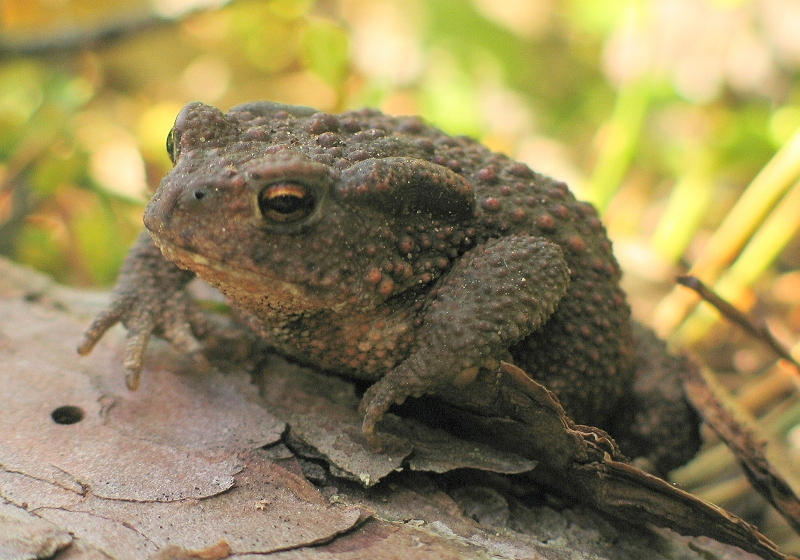
Common toad

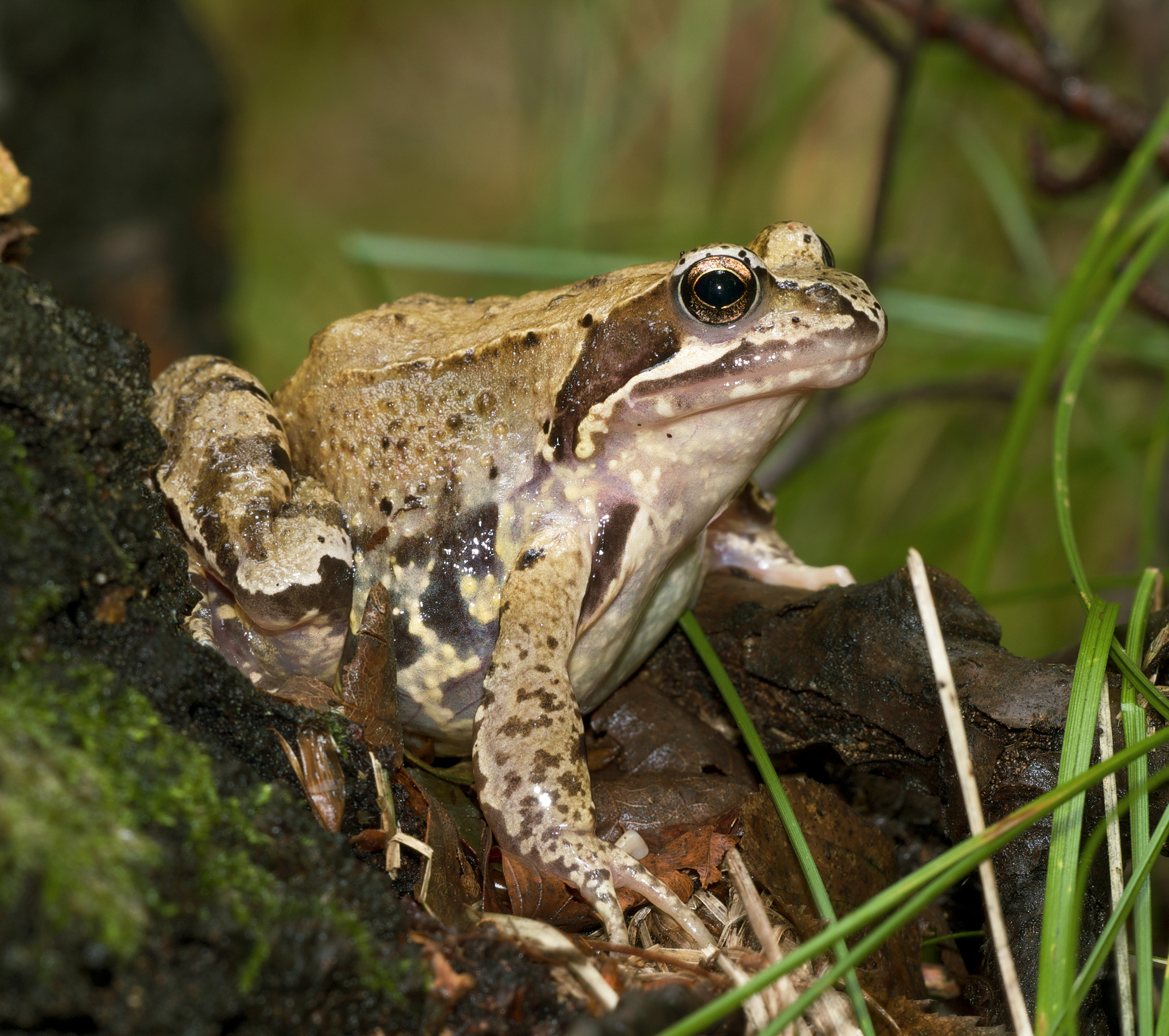
Common frog

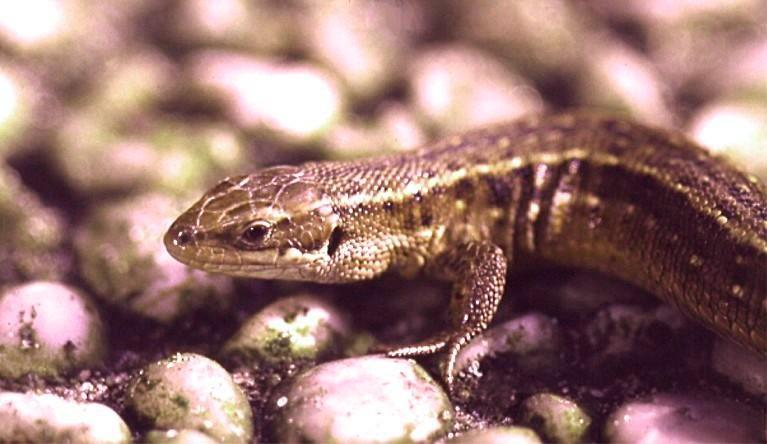
Viviparous lizard

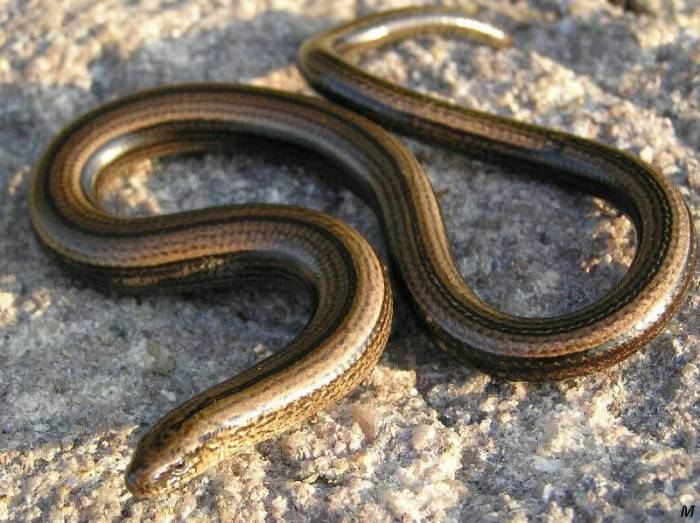
Slowworm

==== Invertebrates ====
Reproduction of Odonata is not possible on the site because of the lack of standing water. However, thanks to the richness of insects in the herbaceous areas, several species can be encountered including the western clubtail ( Gomphus pulchellus), a species present in the Regional Red List of dragonflies North Pas-de-Calais.

Twenty-three species of butterflies and 105 species of moth enjoy the floral diversity of the site. The holly blue (Celastrina argiolus) is a heritage species.

Of the nine species of Orthoptera identified, two are considered heritage: the sickle-bearing bush cricket (Phaneroptera falcata), rare in the region, enjoys the dry and high herbaceous areas and the long-horned groundhopper (Tetrix tenuicornis) is a pioneer species of poor vegetation settings.

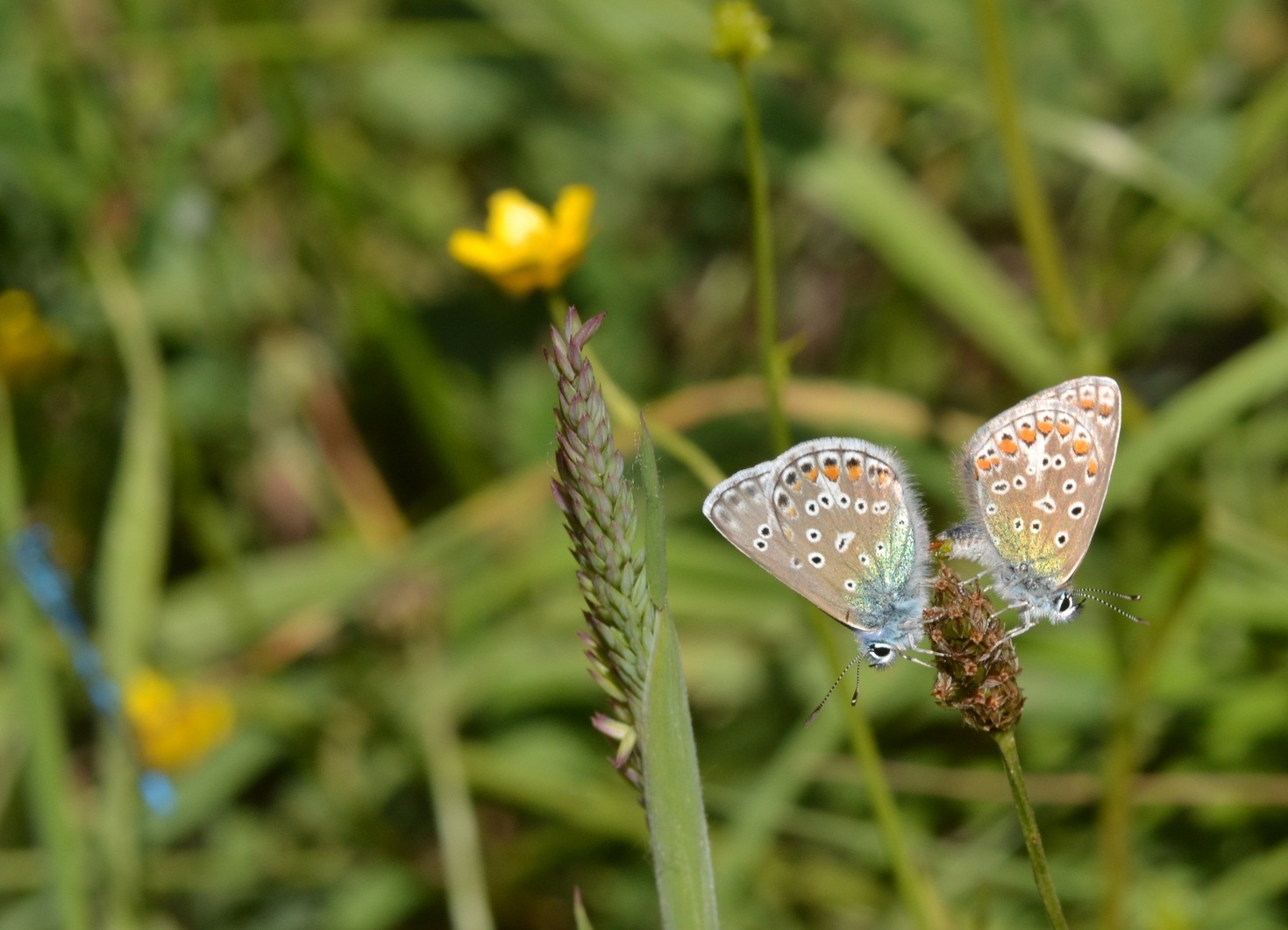
Holly blue

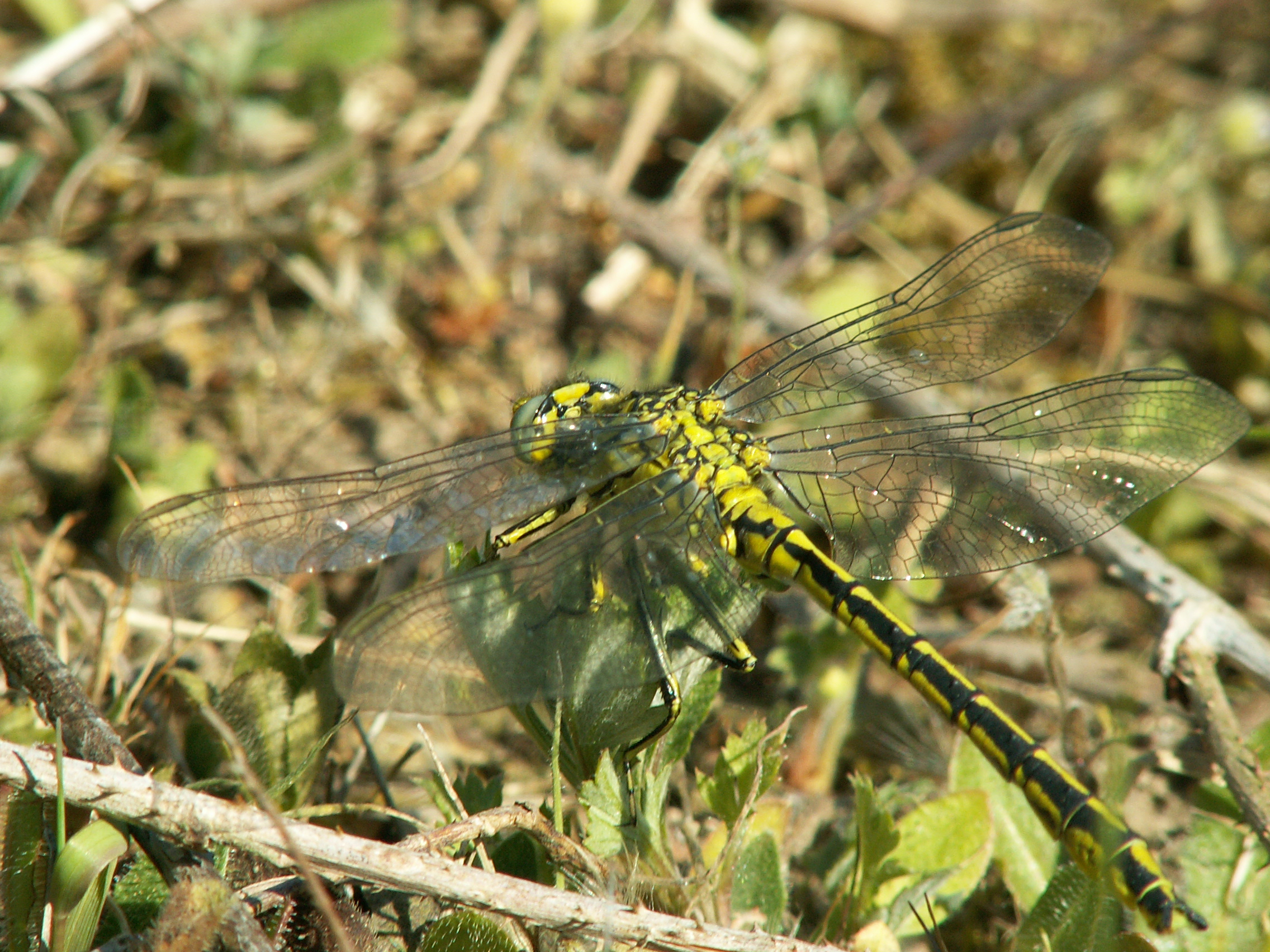
Western clubtail

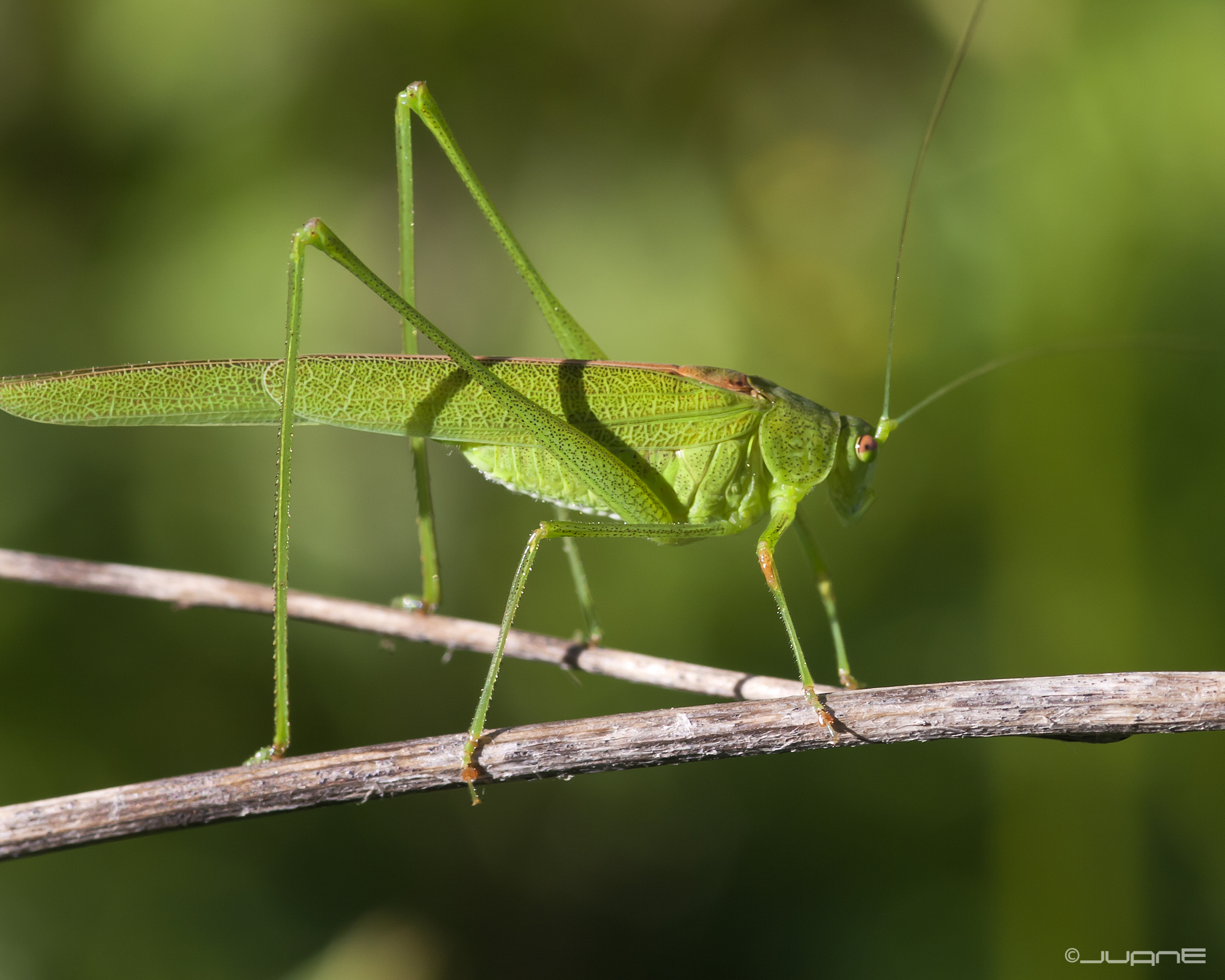
Sickle-bearing bush cricket

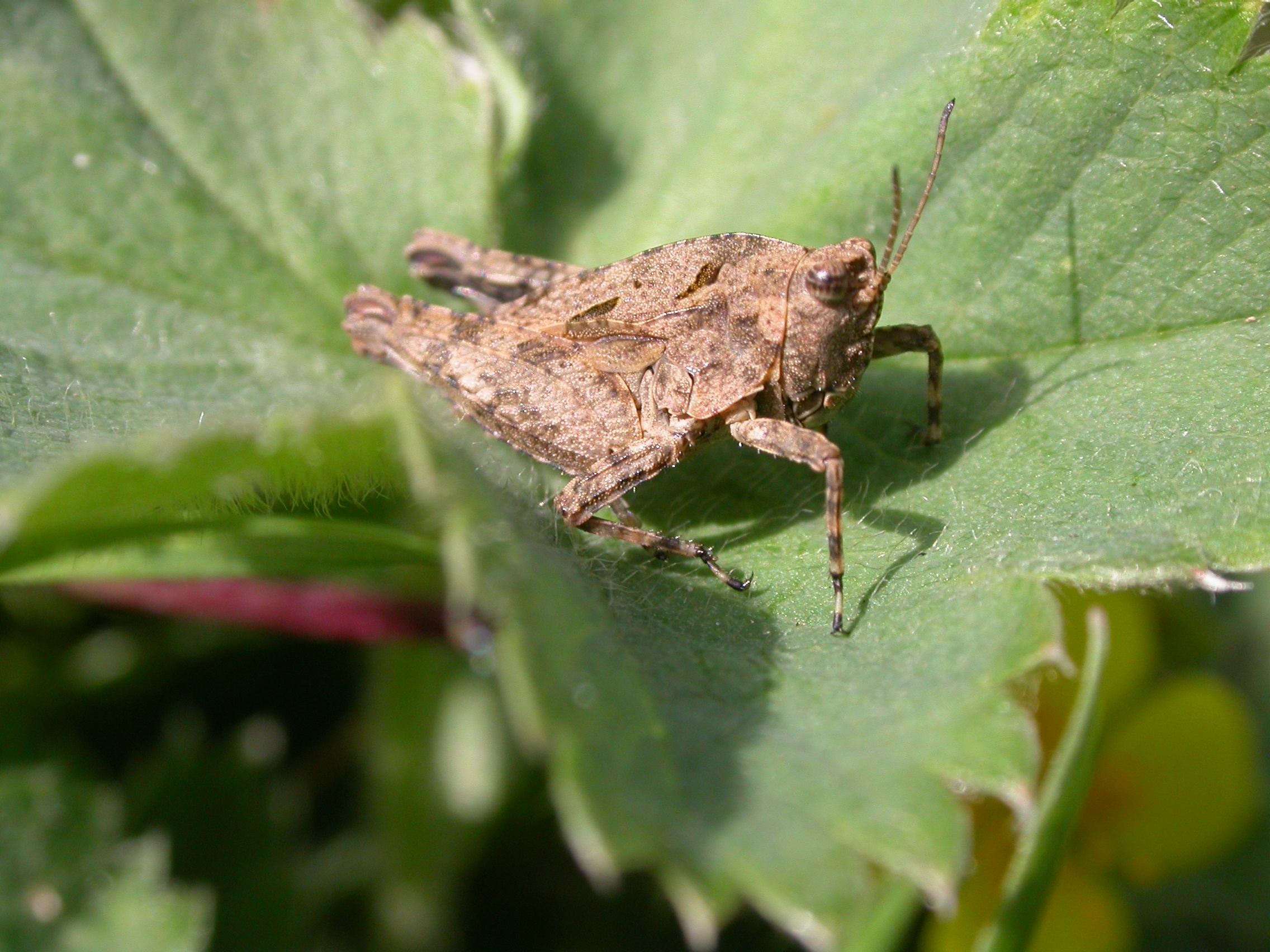
Long-horned groundhopper

Integration of the reserve in the wildlife corridor.

=== The wildlife corridor ===
To the north are present two sites containing a rich biodiversity: the Natura 2000 Belgian area "Hauts-Pays des Honnelles" and a ZNIEFF (Note: ZNIEFF is an acronym for Zone Naturelle d'Intérêt Écologique, Faunistique et Floristique, natural area of ecological, faunal and floral interest. The designation of a ZNIEFF is essentially based on the presence of species or groups of species with high heritage value) "Vallée de l’Hogneau et ses versants et les ruisseaux d’Heugnies et de Bavay". The Bellignies quarry with embankments similar to those which filled "Carrière des Nerviens" is therefore under similar ecological conditions. In the south, the Forêt de Mormal is a major area for biodiversity covered by ZNIEFF and Natura 2000 sites. The railway, unused recently and the stream Ruisseau de Bavay then the river Hogneau provide connection.

=== Threats and responses ===
In the past, the site was threatened by garbage dumps or by passage of 4x4 vehicles or quads. The installation of gates by the municipality of Bavay solved the problem. Pedestrians rarely venture off the path. The anthropization is limited. The greatest threats to the species are primary succession and invasive plants.

==== Primary succession ====
The marls was colonized by pioneer species, then shrubs and trees, corresponding to a primary succession. Without human intervention, a climax community would be reached. This dynamic may eventually lead to the disappearance of related open environments, particularly heritage species. However woodlands can also play an important role in creating habitat for many species. The management plan is therefore to maintain patch dynamics.

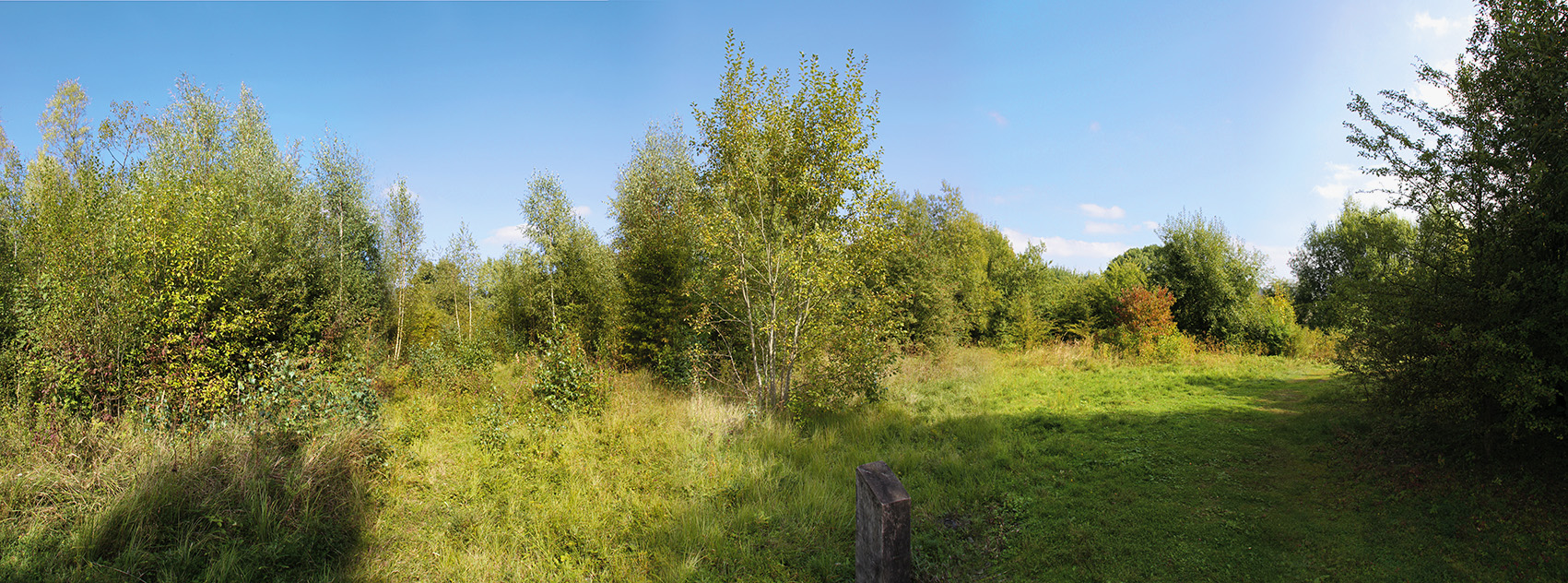
Panoramic view of the reserve

==== Invasive species ====
Four invasive species are a problem in the reserve.

Wood small-reed (Calamagrostis epigejos) is present in the center of the site and threatens to spread into herbaceous areas. It compromises sustainability of stations, including man orchid and bee orchid populations. Two distinct zones can be distinguished. The first, where the wood small-reed has a very high rate of recovery, is not hosting any heritage value. It is mowed early and disposed of. Grazing is not possible at the moment. The second, on the contrary, not densely colonized by this plant is much more of a fragile situation due to the presence of orchids and the sickle-bearing bush cricket or long-horned groundhopper. Differentiated management is applied depending on the issues. At orchid stations, slight thinning is done early by hand pruning. The less dense areas where the grass is sparse (conducive to the long-horned groundhopper (Tetrix tenuicornis)) are pulled. In the newly opened areas, a systematic and annual pulling avoids expansion. Finally, dense areas, well exposed, are left in that state.

Many extensive areas of Japanese knotweed (Fallopia japonica) are on the site. Heritage stations of common butterbur and hart's-tongue fern, colonized by invasive species, are managed by manual removal and disposal for incineration.

The bramble (Rubus sp.) lie around the ruins and along the south-east of the site near the houses. Due to an interest in preserving wildlife (e.g. refuge for mammals, insects, nesting wrens), they are not eradicated but contained.

Canada golden-rod (Solidago canadensis) appeared in 2003 as a result of plant deposits. The threat proved to be serious the following year. Some stations show a significant concentration of the species, while isolated plants grow everywhere on the site. This plant is easily pulled by hand before flowering to prevent seed dispersal, and the shoots are burned.

Finally, panicled aster (Symphyotrichum lanceolatum) is also present among the invasive plants. In their native countries, American asters are found in wet places. In France, these plants colonize relatively dry ruderal areas (brownfields, road shoulder ...) or wetlands. In this second case, asters show strong invasive behavior. In the reserve, where the majority of areas are dry, this plant does not present special hazards and removal is managed easily.

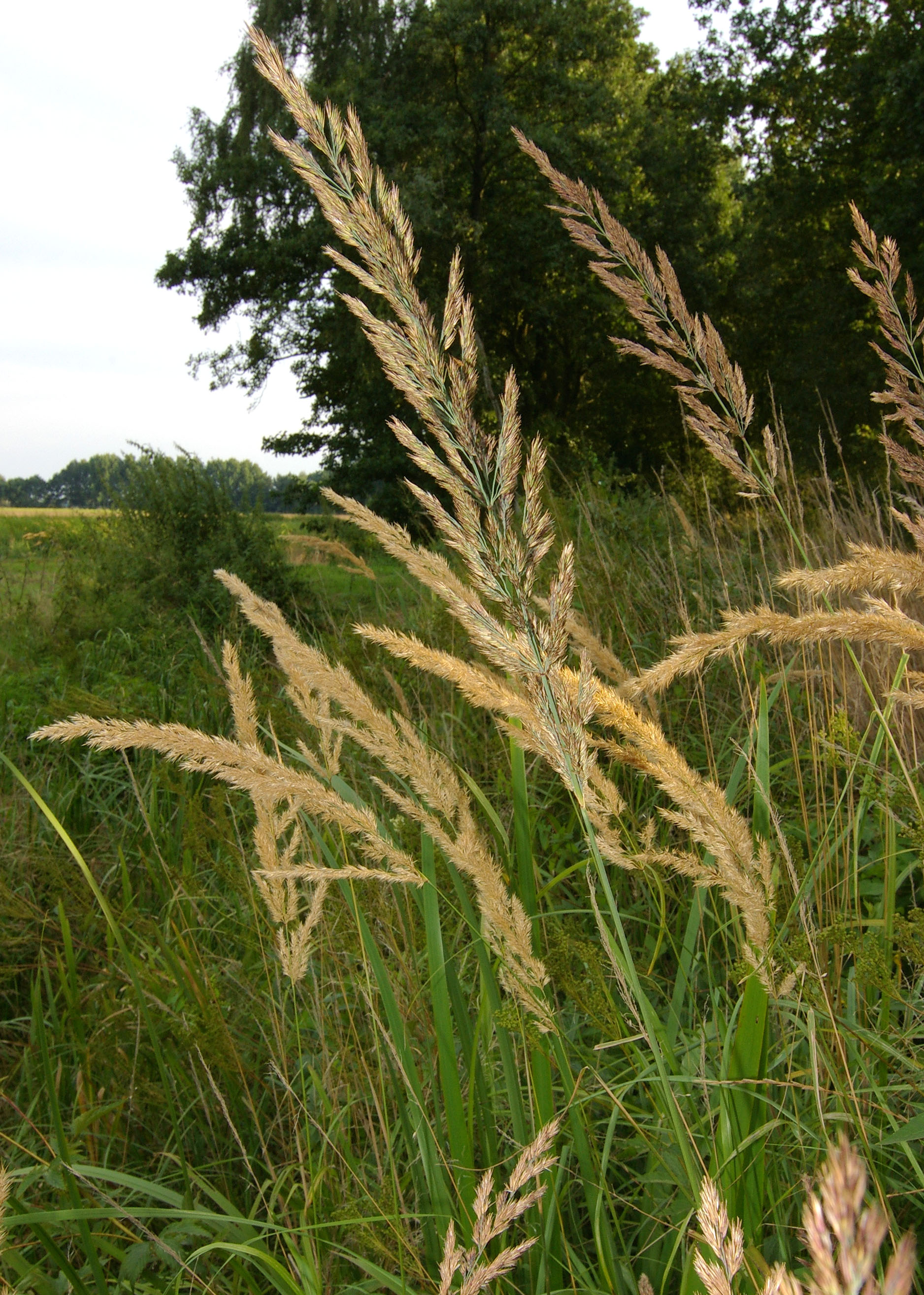
Wood small-reed

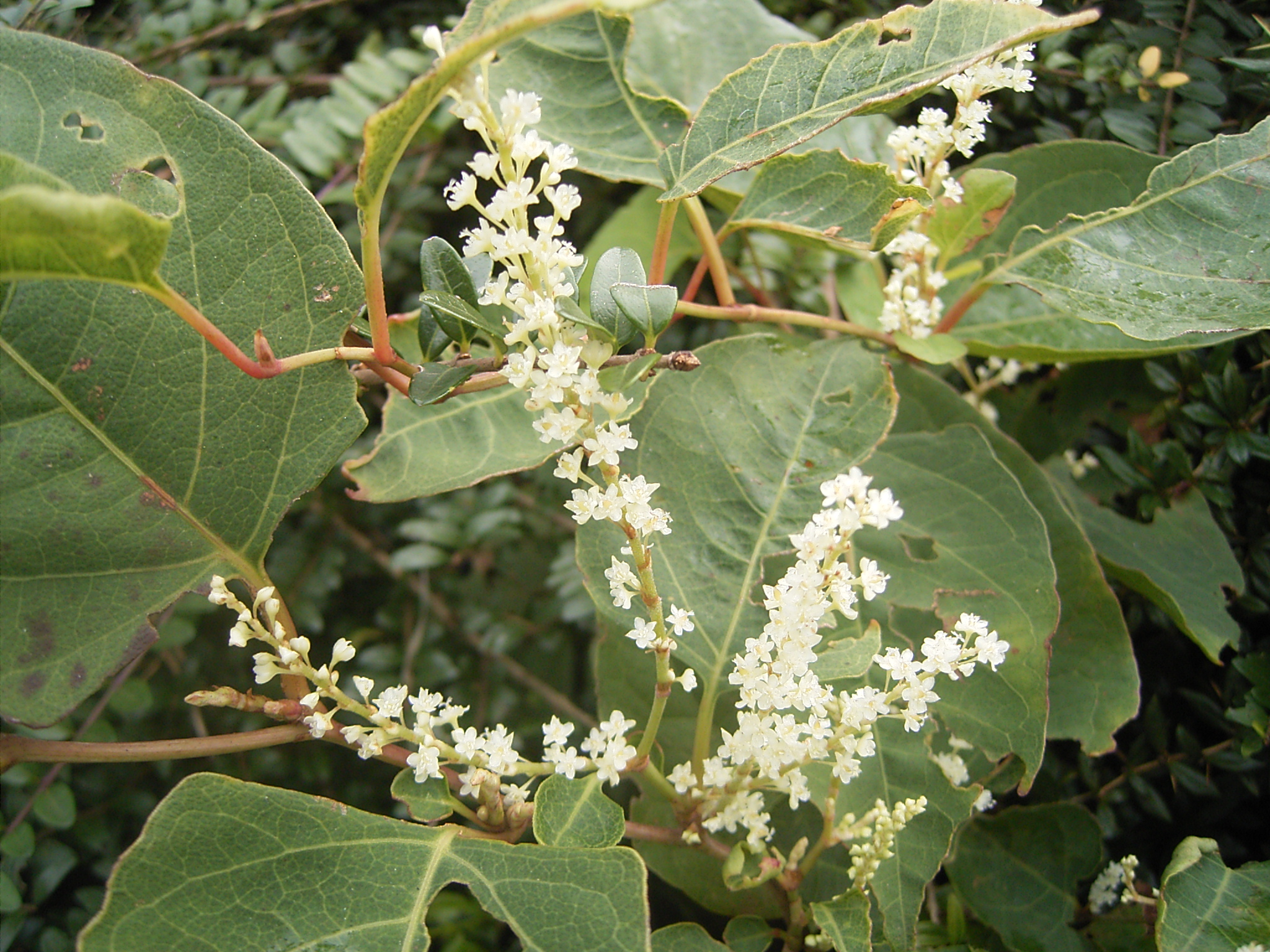
Japanese knotweed

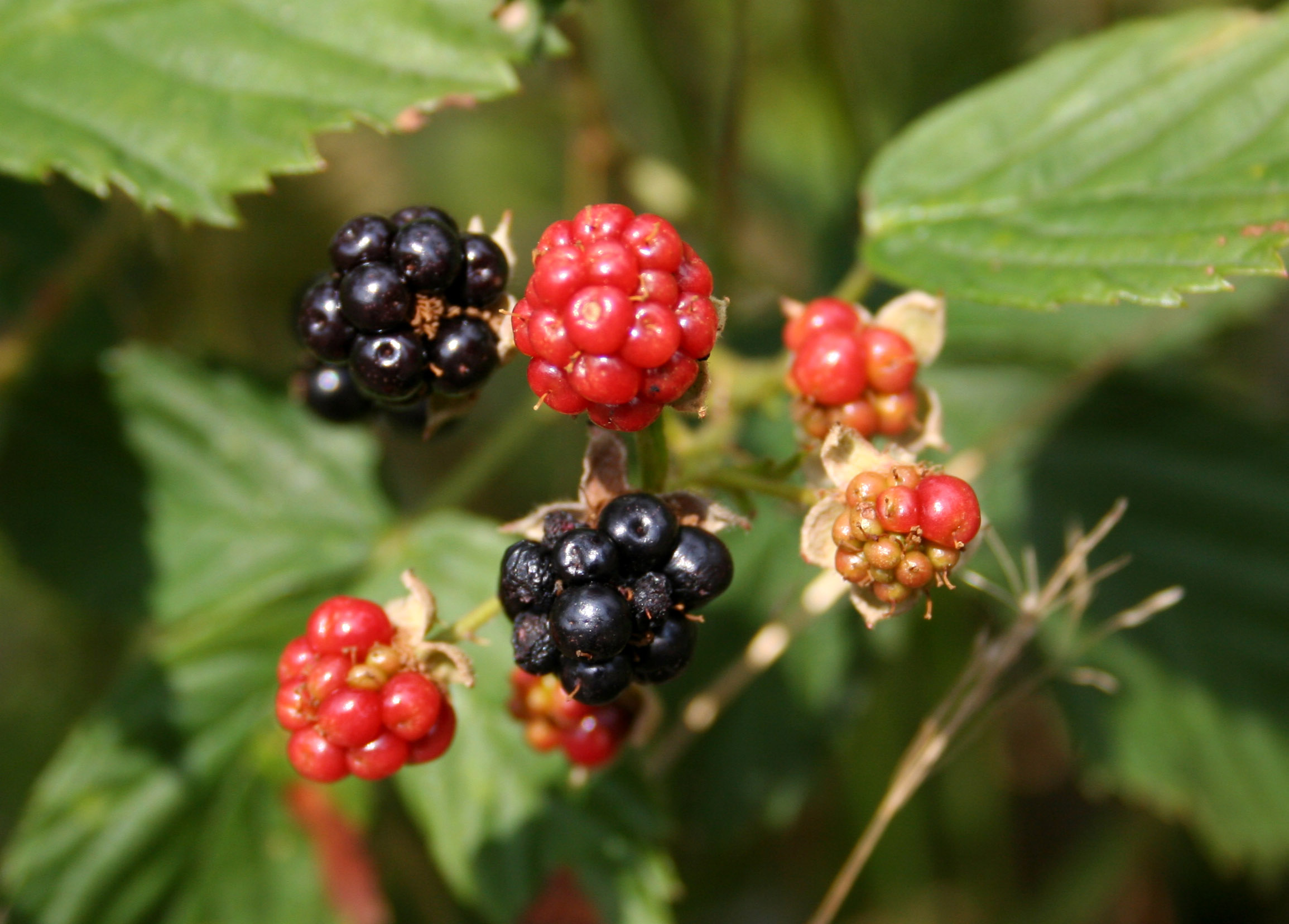
Bramble

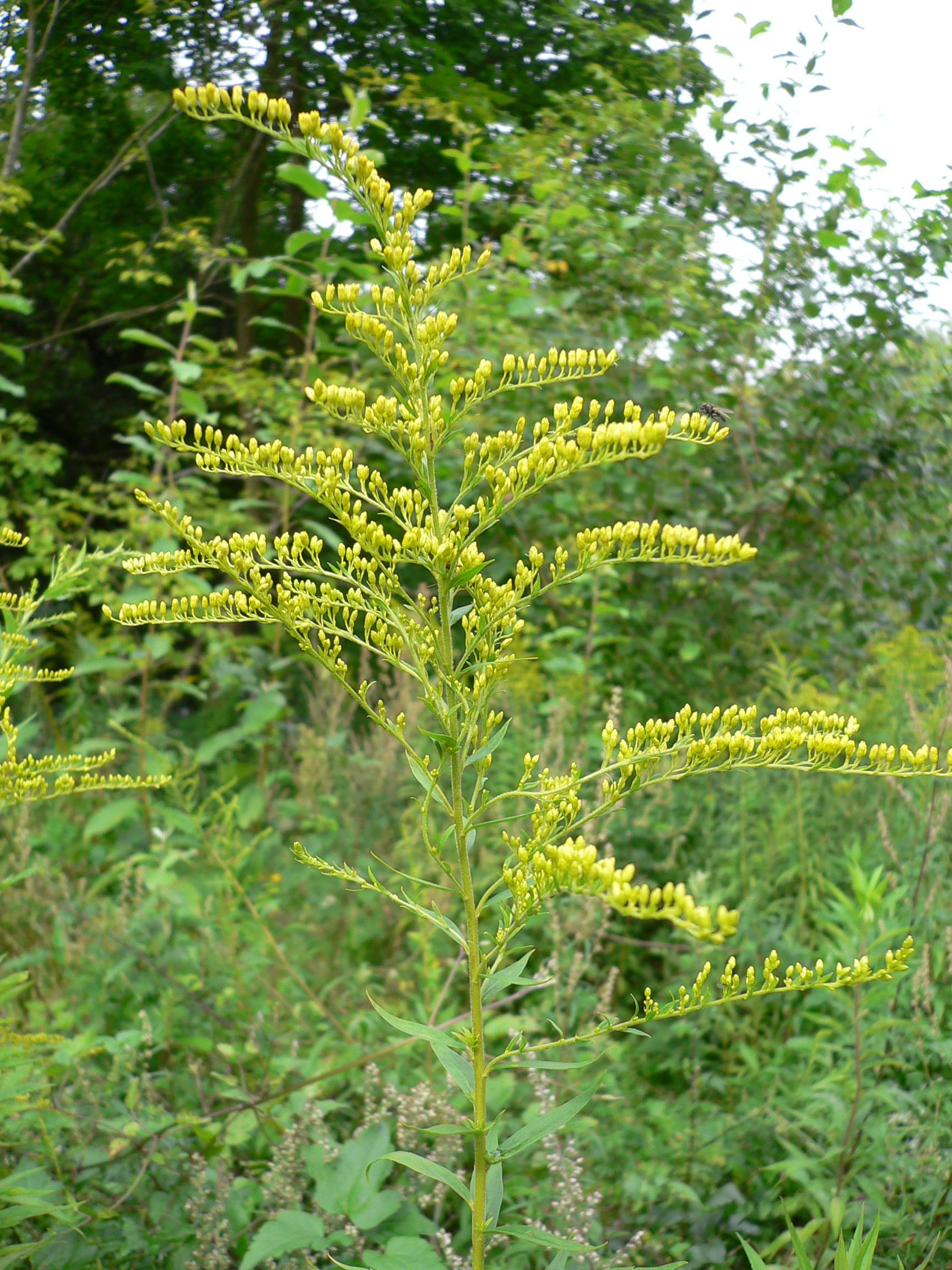
Canada golden-rod

== Management ==
=== Protection ===
Parcels of land owned by the CPIE Bocage de l'Avesnois were classified as a regional nature reserve on 25 May 2009 by decision of the Conseil Régional Nord-Pas-de-Calais. The entire site is included in a ZNIEFF type 1 (Note: ZNIEFF type 1, of small size, are environmentally homogeneous spaces and have at least one species and / or rare or threatened habitat of local and regional, national or community interest, or they are spaces of great interest in the functioning of the local ecology.) Château de Rametz (carrière des Nerviens) and another of type 2 (Note: ZNIEFF type 2 are very rich natural sets, or slightly modified, which provide important biological potential. They may include ZNIEFF type 1 and have a functional role and an ecological and landscape coherence.) Complexe écologique de la forêt de Mormal et des zones bocagères associées.

=== Management objectives ===
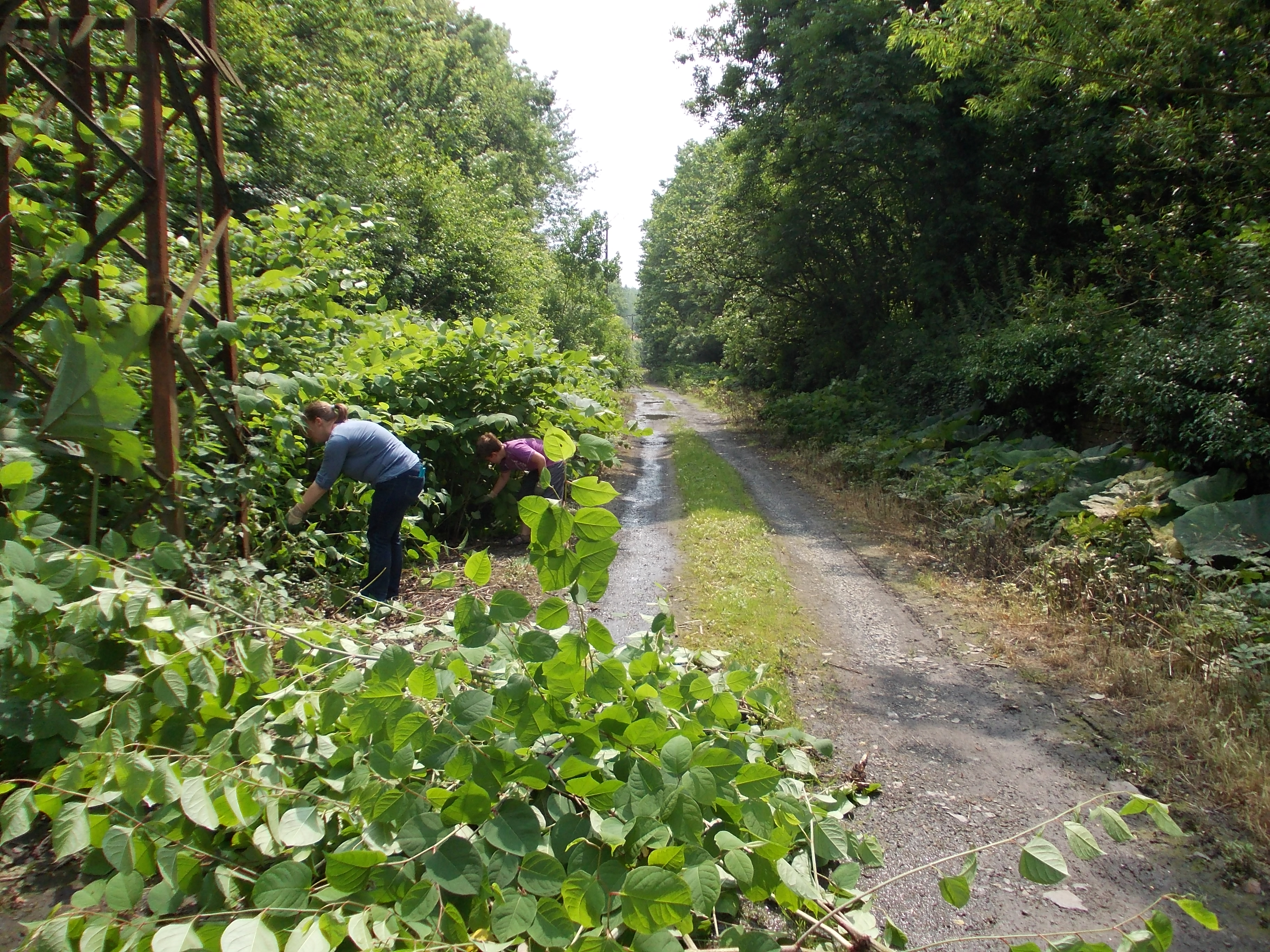
Volunteers grubbing-up Japanese knotweed

The second version of the environmental management scheme covers the period 2007–2012. It presents the knowledge, management, monitoring and vulgarization objectives.

The preservation of the existing diversity was the most important goal. It required conservation of the heritage plant communities: tall-herb fen with common butterbur, the chasmophytic vegetation with hart's-tongue fern and the woody fringe Lathyro sylvestris – Astragaletum glycyphylli. The survival of populations of round-leaved wintergreen and of man orchid, the two most interesting plants, was also a priority, as a strikeout against brush invasion in the open areas where bee orchid and pyramidal orchid grow. The natural forest dynamics are to be contained within areas of clear undergrowth or fringes with these species: common spotted orchid, zigzag clover and lesser butterfly-orchid. Pioneer areas with mushrooms should be preserved and the invasive species contained. Artificial infrastructures (ruin, concrete pylons, walls and rock piles) should be utilized for the creation of new habitats.

The education, interpretation and promotion of local heritage missions should also be continued, while the fauna knowledge was to be developed and floristic monitoring provided.

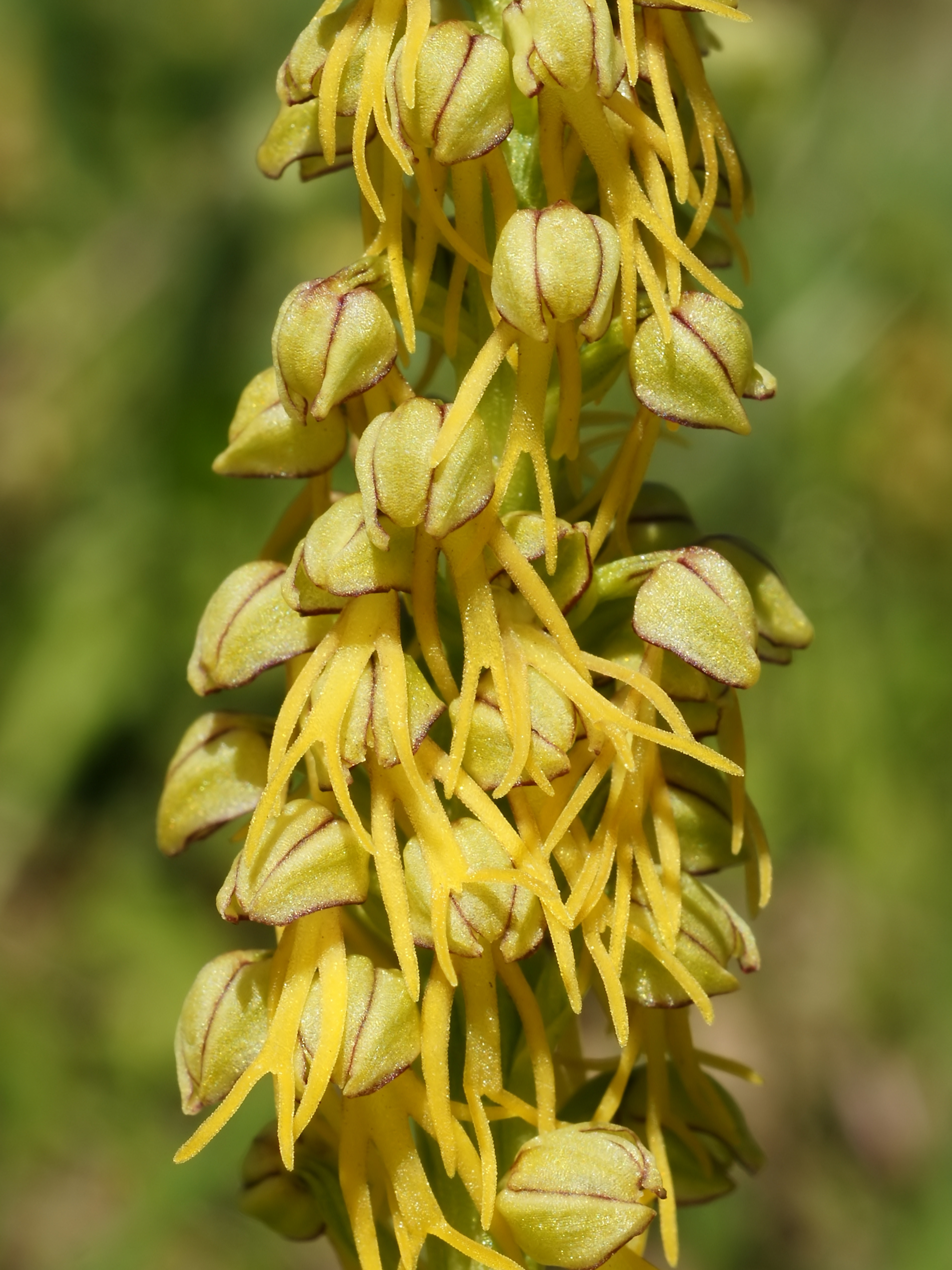
Man orchid

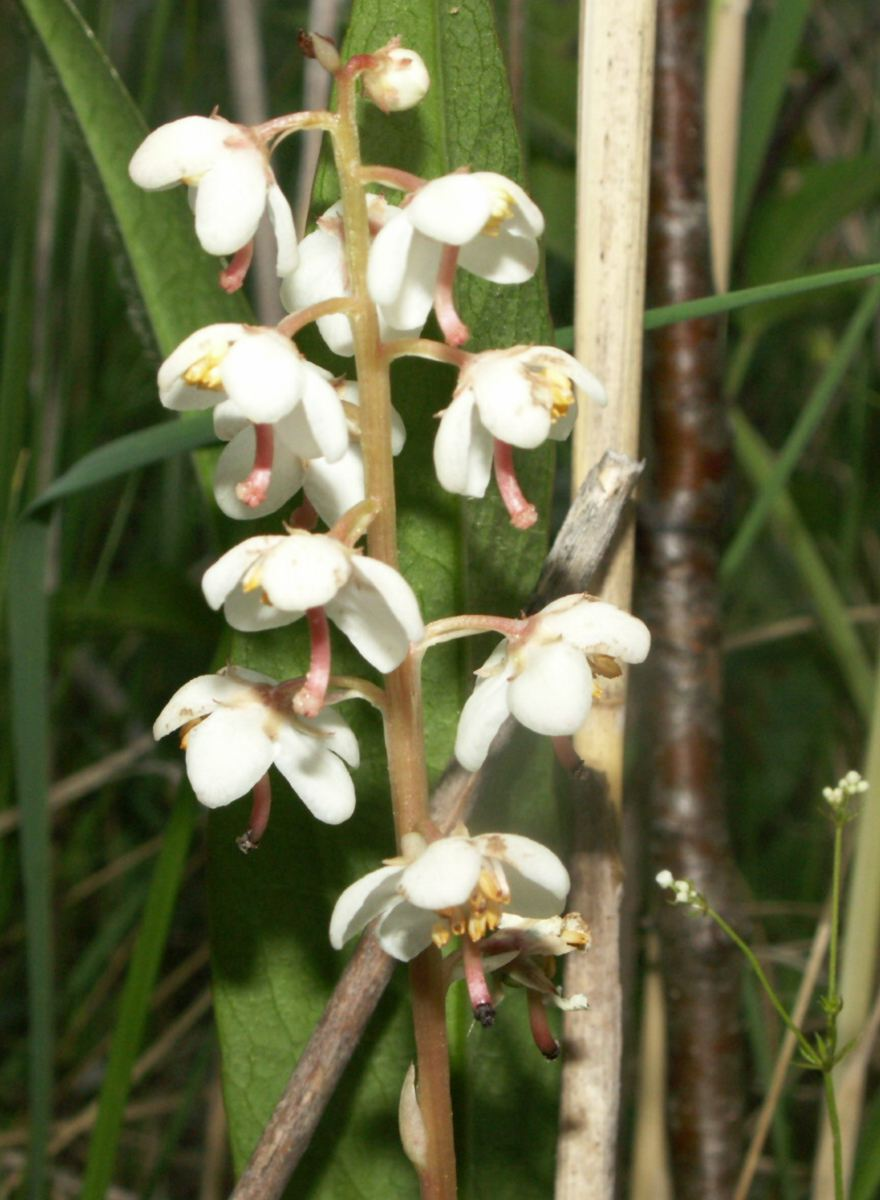
Round-leaved wintergreen

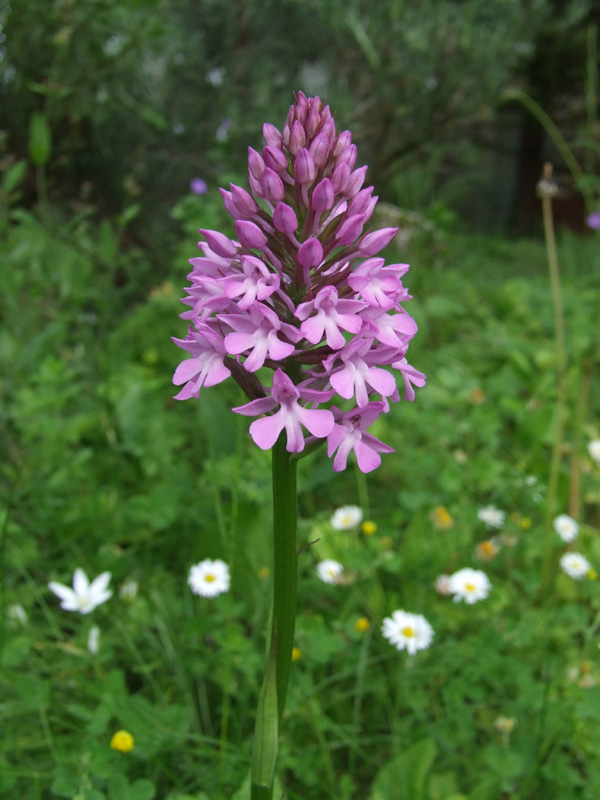
Pyramidal orchid

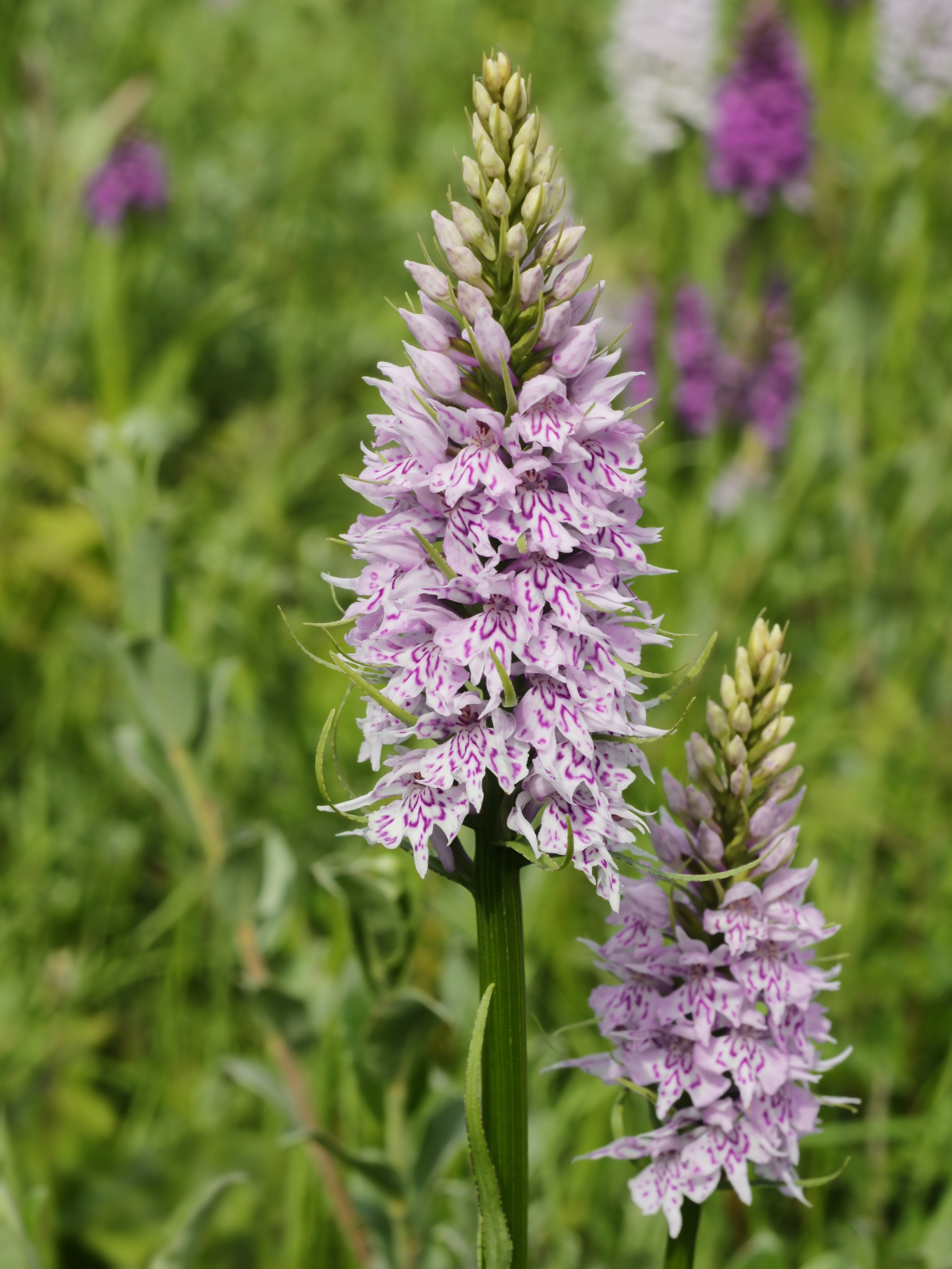
Common spotted orchid

=== Assessment of the activities ===
Evaluation is in progress. However, a partial analysis is already underway.

==== Activities carried out ====
The Bavay's municipality has erected two barriers to prohibit access to motorized vehicles. Volunteers and employees of the CPIE Bocage de l'Avesnois manage the site regularly.

==== Management of the diversity ====
Manual removal of the Japanese knotweed has preserved heritage stations of common butterbur and hart's-tongue fern. Early hand pruning was conducive to orchids. The late mowing seems rather ineffective. The grubbing-up of the Canada golden-rod and American asters was successful. The bush clearing and selective logging have helped maintain the wood-fringe with narrow-leaved everlasting-pea and liquorice milkvetch. Common spotted orchid, zigzag clover and lesser butterfly-orchid, species non-adapted to open areas, benefited areas without clearing. The low dry-stone walls probably favored the installation of viviparous lizard or common wall lizard, observed in 2013, but also the consolidation of the hart's-tongue fern population.

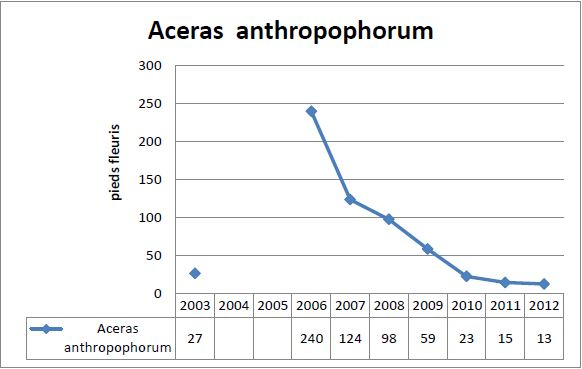
Evolution of the size of population of man orchid.

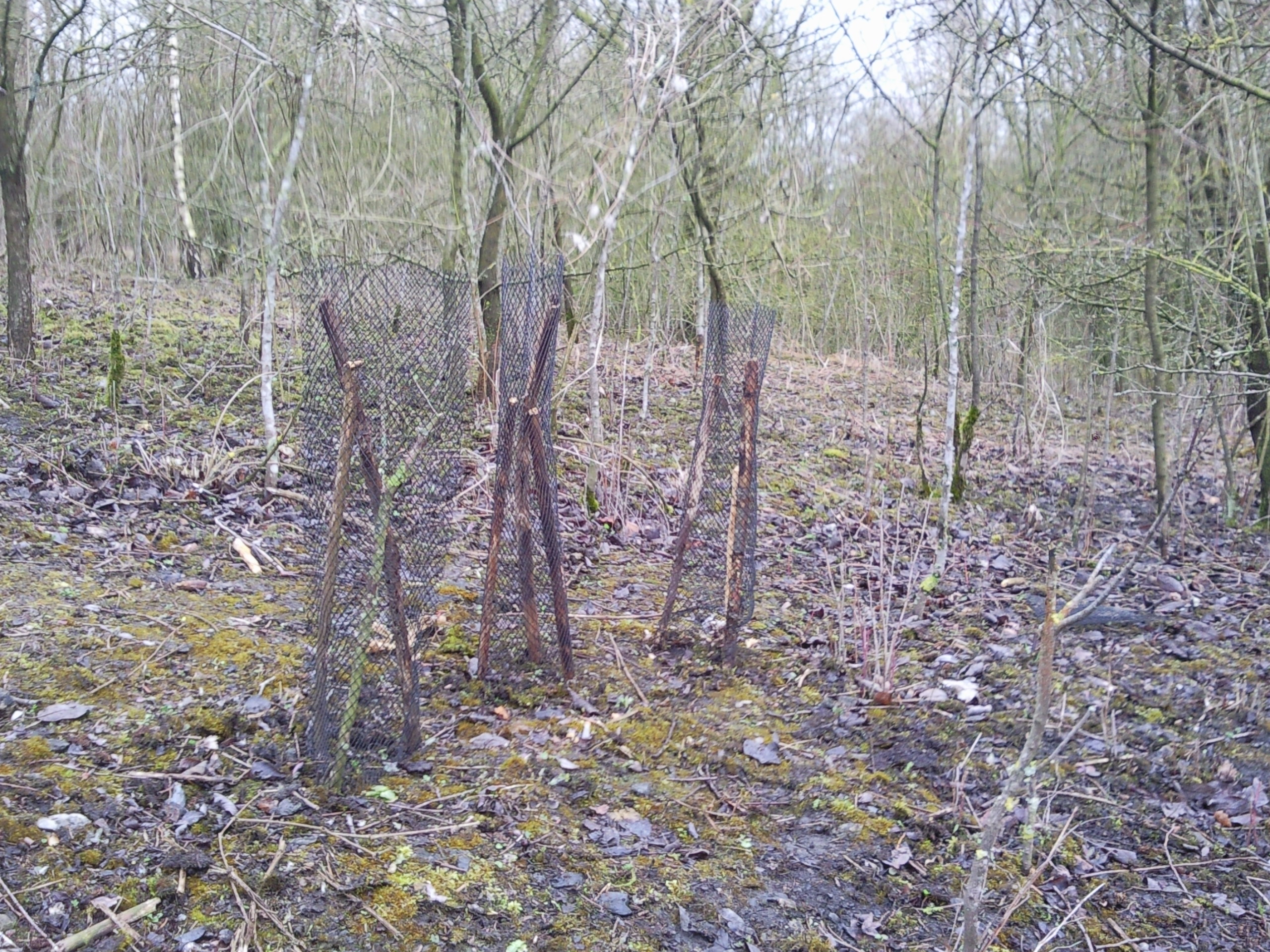
Protective device of man orchid seedlings.

From 2007 to 2012, the number of round-leaved wintergreen footage increased by 50 percent. On the other hand, those of man orchid fall suddenly and continually. Whereas 27 plants were counted in 2003, the number reached a peak of 240 in 2006 with the uprooting of the wood small-reed, before collapsing to 13 plants in 2012, despite the continued management. The observation of gnawed seedlings can assume leaf consumption by herbivores. Protection against rodents was established in 2013 and will be evaluated at flowering.

On this site, 171 plant species are surveyed. Given its size and poor soil, this diversity is notable. Management undertaken in recent years has been essential to maintaining open areas, the most threatened by primary succession. Thus, the various vegetation layers (pioneer and mature woodland, bushy areas, open areas) provide a mosaic of habitats, and thus remarkable species.

==== Improved knowledge of flora and fauna ====
Besides heritage plants monitoring, an additional inventory of Orthoptera is being undertaken; three new species were identified in 2013: common pheasant, Eurasian siskin and common wall lizard. Fourteen new plants were also identified. Inventories of bats and mushrooms are being carried out by partners.

==== Education, interpretation and promotion of local heritage ====
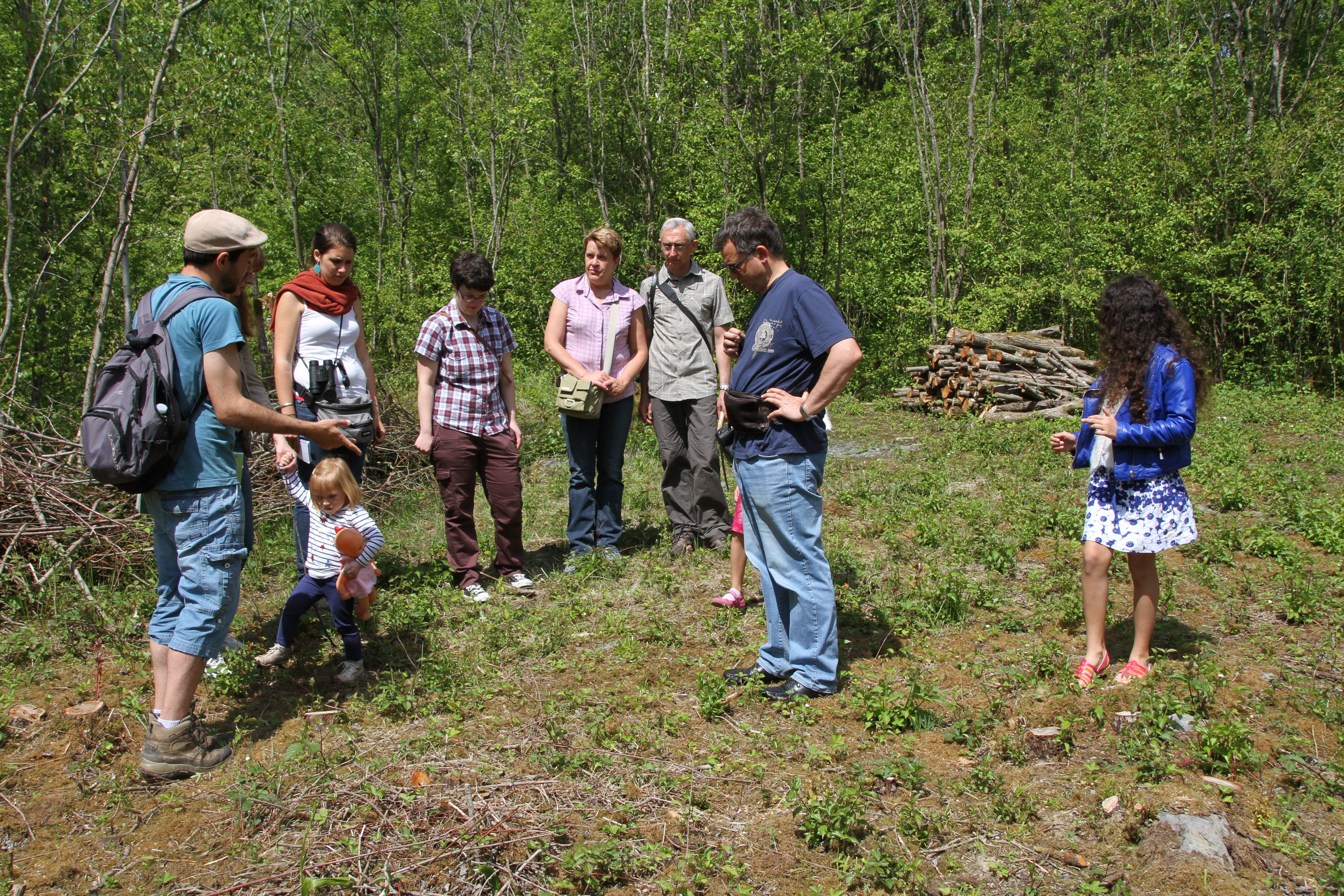
Guided outing in the site.

Guided outing and participatory management sessions are regularly held with the public or agricultural colleges, including invasive species managing. The heritage interpretation site has yet to be finalized.

=== New opportunities ===
Interreg micro projects, established in February 2012, resulted in methodological exchanges on the management of reserves between two Belgian associations Réserves naturelles et ornithologiques de Belgique and Natagora.

A new environmental management scheme is now under consideration.

== Bibliography ==
=== Studies of the reserve ===
The following documents are available from the operator: CPIE Bocage de l'Avesnois.

- CPIE Bocage de l'Avesnois (2007). Plan de gestion 2007–2012 de la réserve naturelle régionale de la carrière des Nerviens [Carrière des Nerviens Regional Nature Reserve Environmental Management Scheme 2007–2012] (in French). Gussignies: CPIE Bocage de l'Avesnois. p. 141.
- Haouat, Safia (2013). Proposition d'évaluation du plan de gestion 2008–2012 de la Réserve Naturelle Régionale de la carrière des Nerviens dans le cadre du renouvellement de son plan de gestion [Assessment proposal of Carrière des Nerviens Regional Nature Reserve Environmental Management Scheme 2008–2012 in the context of its renewal] (in French). Gussignies: CPIE Bocage de l'Avesnois. p. 107.
- Bissey, Virginie (2003). Plan de gestion 2003–2007 de la future réserve naturelle régionale de Rametz [Rametz future Regional Nature Reserve Environmental Management Scheme 2003–2007] (in French). Gussignies: Nord Nature Bavaisis.
- Julve, Philippe (2003). Étude de la flore et de la végétation de l'ancienne carrière de Rametz [Study of flora and vegetation of the old Rametz quarry] (in French). Gussignies: Nord Nature Bavaisis. p. 23.
- Lecron, Jean-Michel (2013). Inventaire des Bryophytes de la Réserve naturelle régionale de la Carrière des Nerviens [Inventory of Bryophytes of the Carrière des Nerviens Regional Nature Reserve] (in French). Bailleul: Conservatoire Botanique National de Bailleul.
- Lecuru, Christophe; Courtecuisse, Régis (2004). Rapport d'étude mycologique (inventaire et évaluation patrimoniale) sur le bois d'Encade (Gussignies) et la carrière de Rametz [Mycology study report (inventory and heritage evaluation) in the bois d'Encade (Gussignies) and Rametz quarry] (in French). Lille: A.R.U.M. (Association de Recherches Universitaires Multi-disciplinaires), Département de Botanique.

=== History of quarry and geology ===
- Association française pour l'avancement des sciences (1909). Lille et la région du nord en 1909 [Lille and the northern region in 1909] (in French). Lille: imp. I. Danel. p. XIII, 1061. Archived from the original on 12 October 2013.
- Boulvain, Frédéric; Pingot, Jean-Louis (2011). Genèse du sous-sol de la Wallonie [Genesis of the Wallonia subsoil] (PDF). Bruxelles: Académie royale de Belgique. p. 190. ISBN 978-2-8031-0288-4.
- Bureau de Recherches Géologiques et Minières (1972). Carte géologique à 1/50000: Le Quesnoy [Geologic card to 1/50000: Le Quesnoy] (PDF) (in French). Bureau de Recherches Géologiques et Minières. p. 19.
- Bureau de Recherches Géologiques et Minières (2013). "Géologie en Nord-Pas de Calais" [Geology in Nord-Pas-de-Calais] (in French).
- Copper, Paul (2002). "Silurian and Devonian Reefs: 80 Million Years of Global Greenhouse Between Two Ice Ages". Phanerozoic Reef Patterns. Vol. 72. pp. 181–238. doi:10.2110/pec.02.72.0181. ISBN 1-56576-081-6.
- Cornet, Jules (1899). "Compte-rendu de la session extraordinaire de la société géologique de Belgique tenue à Mons du 26 au 27 septembre 1899" [Record of the extraordinary session of the Geologic Society of Belgium held in Mons from 26 to 27 September 1899]. Annales de la société géologique de Belgique (in French). 26. Société géologique de Belgique: CCCVI, 177, 41, XXVIII.
- Ladrière, Jules (5 November 1879). "Documents nouveaux pour l'étude du terrain dévonien des environs de Bavay" [New documents for the study of Devonian near Bavay]. Annales de la Société géologique du Nord (in French). VII. Société géologique du Nord: 1–11.
- Ladrière, Jules (4 May 1881). "Etude géologique sur les tranchées du chemin de fer du Quesnoy à Dour" [Geologic study on the railway trenches of the line Le Quesnoy-Dour]. Annales de la Société géologique du Nord (in French). XIII. Société géologique du Nord: 135–176.
- Ladrière, Jules (September 1905). "Les affleurements du Terrain Dévonien dans les environs de Bavai" [Devonian outcrops near Bavai]. Annales de la Société géologique du Nord (in French). XXXIV. Société géologique du Nord: 205–264.
- National Stratigraphic Commission Belgium (2013). "Famennian Lithostratigraphic Units". Archived from the original on 12 October 2013.
- Van Bellingen, Luc (2013). "Géologie du Dévonien" [Devonian geology] (in French). Archived from the original on 12 October 2013.
- Van Bellingen, Luc (2013). "Le Famennien" [Famennian] (in French).

=== Ecology and management ===
- Duhamel, Françoise; Catteau, Emmanuel (2010). "Inventaire des végétations de la région Nord-Pas de Calais: Partie 1. Analyse synsystématique. Évaluation patrimoniale (influence anthropique, raretés, menaces et statuts). Liste des végétations disparues ou menacées" [Inventory of the vegetations of the Nord-Pas-de-Calais region: Part 1. Synsytematic analysis. Heritage assessment (anthropogenic influence, rarities, threats and statutes). List of extirpated or threatened vegetations.] (PDF). Bulletin de la Société de Botanique du Nord de la France. 63 (1). Centre régional de phytosociologie agréé Conservatoire botanique national de Bailleul, avec la collaboration du collectif phytosociologique interrégional: 1–83. Archived from the original (PDF) on 12 October 2013.
- European commission (April 2013). "Interpretation Manual of European Union Habitats:EUR 28" (PDF).
- GON, SfO et CFR (2012). "Liste rouge régionale – Nord – Pas-de-Calais: Les Odonates du Nord–Pas-de-Calais" [Nord-Pas-de-Calais red regional list: Odonata of the Nord-Pas-de-Calais] (PDF) (in French).
- INPN (2013). "ZNIEFF 310030028 - Château de Rametz (carrière des Nerviens): Commentaires" [ZNIEFF 310030028 - Château de Rametz (carrière des Nerviens): Comments] (in French).
- INPN (2013). "ZNIEFF 310030028 - Château de Rametz (carrière des Nerviens): Espèces" [ZNIEFF 310030028 - Château de Rametz (carrière des Nerviens): Species] (in French).
- Lecron, Jean-Michel; Hauguel, Jean-Christophe (May 2013). Toussaint, Benoît (ed.). Inventaire des Bryophytes du Nord-Pas de Calais: statuts, rareté et menace [Inventory of the Bryophytes of Nord-Pas-de-Calais: statutes, rarities and threats] (in French) (1a ed.). Bailleul: Centre régional de phytosociologie agréé Conservatoire botanique national de Bailleul, avec la collaboration du Collectif des Bryologues du Nord-Ouest de la France. Archived from the original on 2013-10-12.
- Muller, Serge, ed. (2004). Plantes invasives en France: État des connaissances et propositions d'actions [Invasive Plants in France: states of knowledge and action proposals]. Patrimoines naturels (in French). Vol. 62. Paris: Muséum national d'Histoire naturelle. p. 168. ISBN 978-2-85653-570-7.
- République française (1991). "Arrêté du 1 avril 1991 relatif à la liste des espèces végétales protégées en région Nord - Pas-de-Calais complétant la liste nationale" [Order of 1 April 1991 relating to the list of protected plants in Nord-Pas-de-Calais region completing the national list] (in French).
- Rhind, Peter Martin (2010). "Atlantic European Ecosystems".
- Toussaint, Benoît, ed. (2011). Inventaire de la flore vasculaire du Nord-Pas de Calais (Ptéridophytes et Spermatophytes): raretés, protections, menaces et statuts [Inventory of the vascular flora of the Nord-Pas de Calais (Pteridophyta and Spermatophyta): rarities, protection, threats and status] (PDF) (in French) (4b ed.). Bailleul: Centre régional de phytosociologie agréé Conservatoire botanique national de Bailleul, avec la collaboration du Collectif botanique du Nord-Pas de Calais. pp. I–XX, 1–62. Archived from the original (PDF) on 2013-10-07.
- Swinnen, Vincent (2012). "Première collaboration transfrontalière pour notre Régionale !" [First cross-border cooperation for our regional] (PDF). Echo des Marais (in French) (79). Natagora: 12. Archived from the original (PDF) on 12 October 2013.
- La Voix du Nord (17 September 2010). "Chantier nature demain avec le CPIE" [Nature management tomorrow with CPIE] (in French).

=== Other references ===
- Bromwich, James (2013). The Roman Remains of Northern and Eastern France: A Guidebook. Routledge. p. 480. ISBN 9780415139946.
- Conseil Régional Nord-Pas-de-Calais (25 May 2009). "Délibération de création de la réserve" [Deliberation of the creation of the reserve] (PDF) (in French).
- Réserves naturelles de France (2012). "Carrière des Nerviens" (in French).
