= Mycale adhaerens =

Purple scallop sponge

Scientific classification
- Kingdom: Animalia
- Phylum: Porifera
- Class: Demospongiae
- Order: Poecilosclerida
- Family: Mycalidae
- Genus: Mycale
- Subgenus: Aegogropila
- Species: M. adhaerens

Binomial name
- Mycale adhaerens (Lambe, 1893)

Synonyms
- Esperella adhaerens Lambe, 1893

Species of sponge

Mycale adhaerens, the purple scallop sponge, is a species of marine demosponge in the family Mycalidae. Mycale is a large genus and this species is placed in the subgenus Aegogropila making its full name, Mycale (Aegogropila) adhaerens. It grows symbiotically on the valves of scallop shells and is native to the west coast of North America.

== Description ==
Mycale adhaerens forms a thin encrusting layer on the valves of living scallop shells such as Chlamys hastata and Chlamys rubida. It ranges in colour from yellowish-brown through purple to pink. The only other species of sponge growing on the Pacific Coast with which it might be confused is Myxilla incrustans; that species is usually some shade of brown, has a finer, less fibrous structure and has larger oscula.

== Ecology ==
The relationship between the sponge and the scallop on which it lives is mutualistic, each receiving benefits. The scallop is often preyed on by the starfish Evasterias troschelii but when the starfish touches the sponge it tends to move away, either being repelled by some secretion from the sponge or by the spicules present in the sponge's tissue. If the starfish does try to force the scallop's valves apart, the tube feet seem unable to obtain a purchase on the sponge. Quite apart from this, the scallop will often try to escape from the starfish by swimming away, and will also try to evade the nudibranchs Doris odhneri and Peltodoris nobilis which feed on the sponge.

The presence of the sponge also seems to deter the octopuses Enteroctopus dofleini and Octopus rubescens from feeding on the scallop. The sponge may also benefit from the scallop's movements, both by being transported into areas of clean water and by avoiding the accumulation of sediment.

A number of bioactive metabolites have been isolated from the sponge, some with cytotoxic activity. In Hong Kong, Pseudoalteromonas spongiae, a marine bacterium, has been isolated from the surface of the sponge. The significance of this association is unknown.
