= Sabellaria alcocki =

Scientific classification
- Kingdom: Animalia
- Phylum: Annelida
- Clade: Pleistoannelida
- Clade: Sedentaria
- Family: Sabellariidae
- Genus: Sabellaria
- Species: S. alcocki

Binomial name
- Sabellaria alcocki Gravier, 1906

Synonyms
- Sabellaria spinulosa alcocki Gravier, 1906

Species of annelid worm

Sabellaria alcocki is a species of bristle worm described by Charles Joseph Gravier in 1906 and named in honour of Alfred William Alcock.

Sabellaria spinulosa and S. alcocki are smaller than S. alveolata and inhabit the subtidal and lower intertidal/sublittoral fringes. Sabellaria spinulosa has been described from the North Sea (Leuckart 1849) and S. alcocki from the Indian Ocean (Gravier 1906).

Sabellaria alcocki is included in the genus Sabellaria and family Sabellariidae. No subspecies are listed in Catalogue of Life.
