= Honeycomb tube worm =

Honeycomb tube worm may refer to:

- Honeycomb worm (Sabellaria alveolata)
- Sandcastle worm (Phragmatopoma californica)
