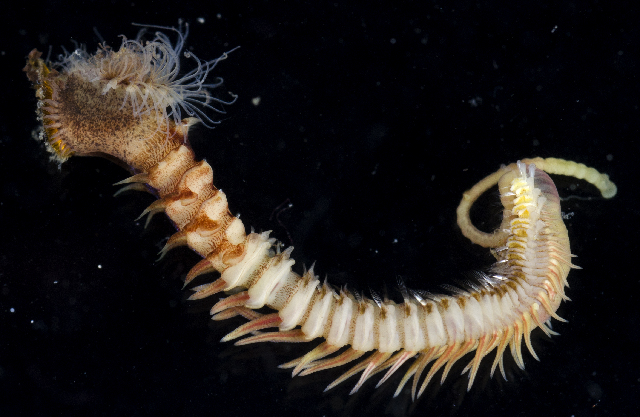
- Image of Neosabellaria cementarium

Scientific classification
- Kingdom: Animalia
- Phylum: Annelida
- Clade: Pleistoannelida
- Clade: Sedentaria
- Family: Sabellariidae
- Genus: Neosabellaria
- Species: N. cementarium

Binomial name
- Neosabellaria cementarium (Moore, 1906)

Synonyms
- Sabellaria cementarium Moore, 1906

= Neosabellaria cementarium =

Species of annelid worm

Neosabellaria cementarium is a species of marine tube worm in the family Sabellariidae, perhaps better known by its previous name, Sabellaria cementarium. It is found in the North Pacific Ocean.

== Description ==
Neosabellaria cementarium lives in a tube which it creates by cementing together grains of sand. This is attached along its length to a rock, shell or other hard substrate. At first it is short but it is widened and extended as the worm grows, sometimes reaching a length of more than 7 centimetres (2.8 in) and a diameter of 4 millimetres (0.16 in). The worm is largely hidden within the tube but it has a yellow or golden-coloured operculum and a number of fine tentacles which it extends in order to feed. Sometimes the tubes are solitary and sometimes they are grouped together but this species does not form reefs.

In California, Neosabellaria cementarium can be confused with the sandcastle worm (Phragmatopoma californica). The latter is a reef-building worm and its tentacles and operculum are purple rather than yellow.

== Distribution ==
Neosabellaria cementarium is found in a range extending from Alaska to southern California.

== Biology ==
Neosabellaria cementarium has trochophore larvae which form part of the plankton. Each larva has a ciliated band with two bundles of long, barbed setae (bristles), one on each side of its body. These are fanned out when the larva is feeding and seem to have a defensive function, perhaps preventing a predator from recognizing the larva as a prey item or irritating the mouth tissues of comb jellies or other predators. Another band of short cilia at the posterior end of the larva enable it to swim, and when it is doing this, the setae are held alongside the body.

In Puget Sound, Washington, aggregations of up to 3,500 tubes of Neosabellaria cementarium per square metre at depths of between 15 and 40 metres (49 and 131 ft) were found to provide a habitat to a diverse range of other organisms not found in adjacent areas.

Neosabellaria cementarium is one of a number of fouling organisms that live as epibionts on the shells of scallops such as Chlamys hastata and Chlamys rubida.
