= Mycale brownorum =

Scientific classification
- Kingdom: Animalia
- Phylum: Porifera
- Class: Demospongiae
- Order: Poecilosclerida
- Family: Mycalidae
- Genus: Mycale
- Species: M. brownorum

Binomial name
- Mycale brownorum Goodwin, Brewin & Brickle, 2012

Species of sponge

Mycale brownorum is a species of demosponge first found on the coast of South Georgia island, in the south west Southern Ocean.
