= Mycale anisochela =

Scientific classification
- Kingdom: Animalia
- Phylum: Porifera
- Class: Demospongiae
- Order: Poecilosclerida
- Family: Mycalidae
- Genus: Mycale
- Subgenus: Mycale (Mycale)
- Species: M. anisochela

Binomial name
- Mycale anisochela Lévi, 1963

Species of demosponge

Mycale anisochela, the brain sponge, is a species of demosponge from South Africa and Namibia.

== Description ==
This sponge is pale yellow to off-white in colour and grows up to 200 mm (7.9 in) long and 120 mm (4.7 in) wide. It has a brain-like growth form. It is highly flexible due to its large internal cavities and fibrous skeleton. The ectosome (the outer region of a sponge) is separated from the choanosome (the inner region) by aquiferous canals that are divided up into more or less regular polygonal areas. Three to six oscula are found in the upper area. These may be up to 15 mm (0.59 in) in diameter.

=== Spicules ===
A variety of spicules make up the skeleton of this species:

- The styles (megascleres with one end pointed and the other rounded) are straight or slightly curved. They become narrower at the base, practically turning into strongyloxeas.
- The anisochelae (microscleres with dissimilar ends) take three forms, the first of which is highly characteristic of this species:
  - Very robust spicules, usually with a bifid medial blade and two ear-like processes near the base. While these are all typically of a similar size, smaller but morphologically similar anisochelae may also be similar.
  - The upper blades irregular and lower blades short.
  - The shaft is incredibly thin, with the lower end turning into a spur like projection.
- There are two kinds of sigmata (c or s shaped microscleres). Both are c-shaped but one is asymmetrical.
- Rhaphides (needle-like spicules)

=== Skeleton ===
Bundles of styles rise from the substratum in a central bundle that may be up to a few centimeters in diameter. This then subdivides and spreads, becoming thinner towards the ectosome. A skeleton of tangential styles, which may be scattered or in bundles, is found in the ectosome. Microscleres are scattered in both the ectosome and the choanosome.

== Distribution and habitat ==
This species has a range from the coast of Namibia, extending down to the south coast of South Africa. This species is one of the most common sponge species off Namibia. It is a deep water sponge, found on rocky substrates at depths of 75–351 m (246–1,152 ft).
