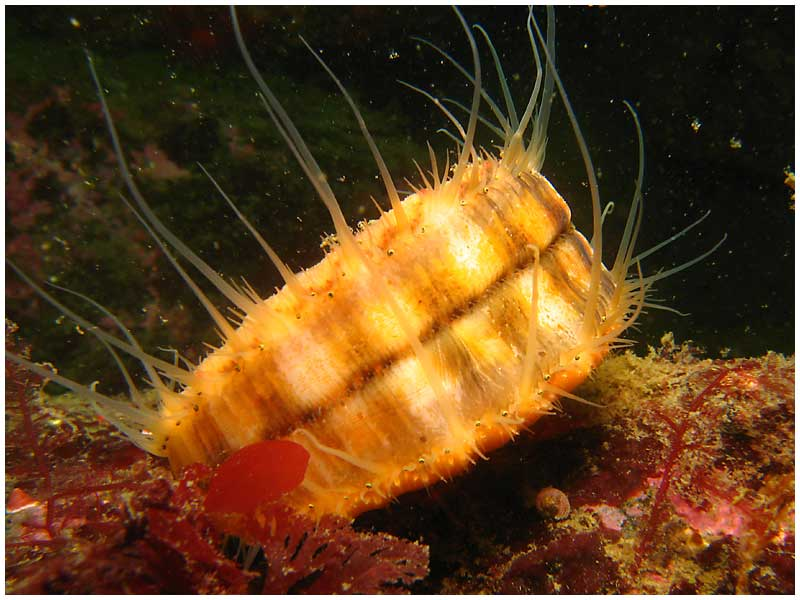

Scientific classification
- Kingdom: Animalia
- Phylum: Mollusca
- Class: Bivalvia
- Order: Pectinida
- Family: Pectinidae
- Genus: Chlamys
- Species: C. hastata

Binomial name
- Chlamys hastata (G. B. Sowerby II, 1842)

= Chlamys hastata =

Chlamys hastata Temporal range: Pliocene-recent

Species of bivalve

Chlamys hastata, the spear scallop, spiny scallop or swimming scallop, is a species of bivalve mollusc in the family Pectinidae found on the west coast of North America from the Gulf of Alaska to San Diego, California. A limited number of these scallops are harvested by divers or by narrow trawls off the west coast of Canada.

The spiny scallop lives on the seabed in the sublittoral zone between low tide mark and a depth of 150 metres (490 ft), on soft sediment or on rock, particularly in areas with a strong current. It is a filter feeder, sieving microscopic algae from water that passes through its gills. It is preyed on by starfish, octopuses and sea otters. It can detect predators by smell and by sight and can swim away from them by opening and closing its valves. Other organisms often grow on the exterior of its shell and it often forms a symbiotic relationship with an encrusting sponge which grows on the upper valve and helps protect it from predators.

== Etymology ==
The scientific name is derived from chlamys, the Latin word for a Greek cloak or short cape made of wool and worn by a soldier, and hastata meaning "spear-like" from the Latin hasta, a spear or javelin.

== Description ==
The shell of the spiny scallop is slightly shaped like a fan and is able to grow to a height of about 9 centimetres (3.5 in) though a more normal adult size is 6 centimetres (2.4 in). The shell is composed of two valves, each of which is convex and has a small number of broad ribs covered with blunt spines. These radiate from the umbone, the rounded protuberance near the hinge, and between them are fine etched striations. The background colour is white with radial bands of pale purple and the right valve, which is usually underneath, is paler than the left. The annual growth rings are visible, often as concentric bands of a different hue. Beside the hinge are two irregular shell flaps or auricles with the anterior one normally being much larger than the other. This provides an attachment for the single strong adductor muscle that closes the shell. On either side of the long hinge there are some little ridges and grooves known as teeth. Their function is to prevent the valves moving sideways with regard to each other. Some bivalve shells have large "cardinal" teeth on the hinge immediately below the umbone, but the spiny scallop does not. Instead it has 5 or 6 lateral teeth lying on either side of the hinge. Lining the inside of the valves is the mantle, a membrane that covers the gut and other internal organs. It can be seen round the margins of the valves as a thick layer like a sandwich filling. It is fringed with numerous short tentacles and there is a row of tiny simple eyes close to each of the valves. The animal usually lies on its right valve and its exposed, left valve often has a colonial sponge growing on it.

The spiny scallop can be distinguished from its close relative the Pacific pink scallop (Chlamys rubida) by the valves being less rounded and by the small curved spines on the ribs which give it a rough texture whereas the Pacific pink feels smooth. The glossy white interior of the spiny scallop's shell often has a purplish blotch near the umbone, not present in the Pacific pink.

Right and left valve of the same specimen:

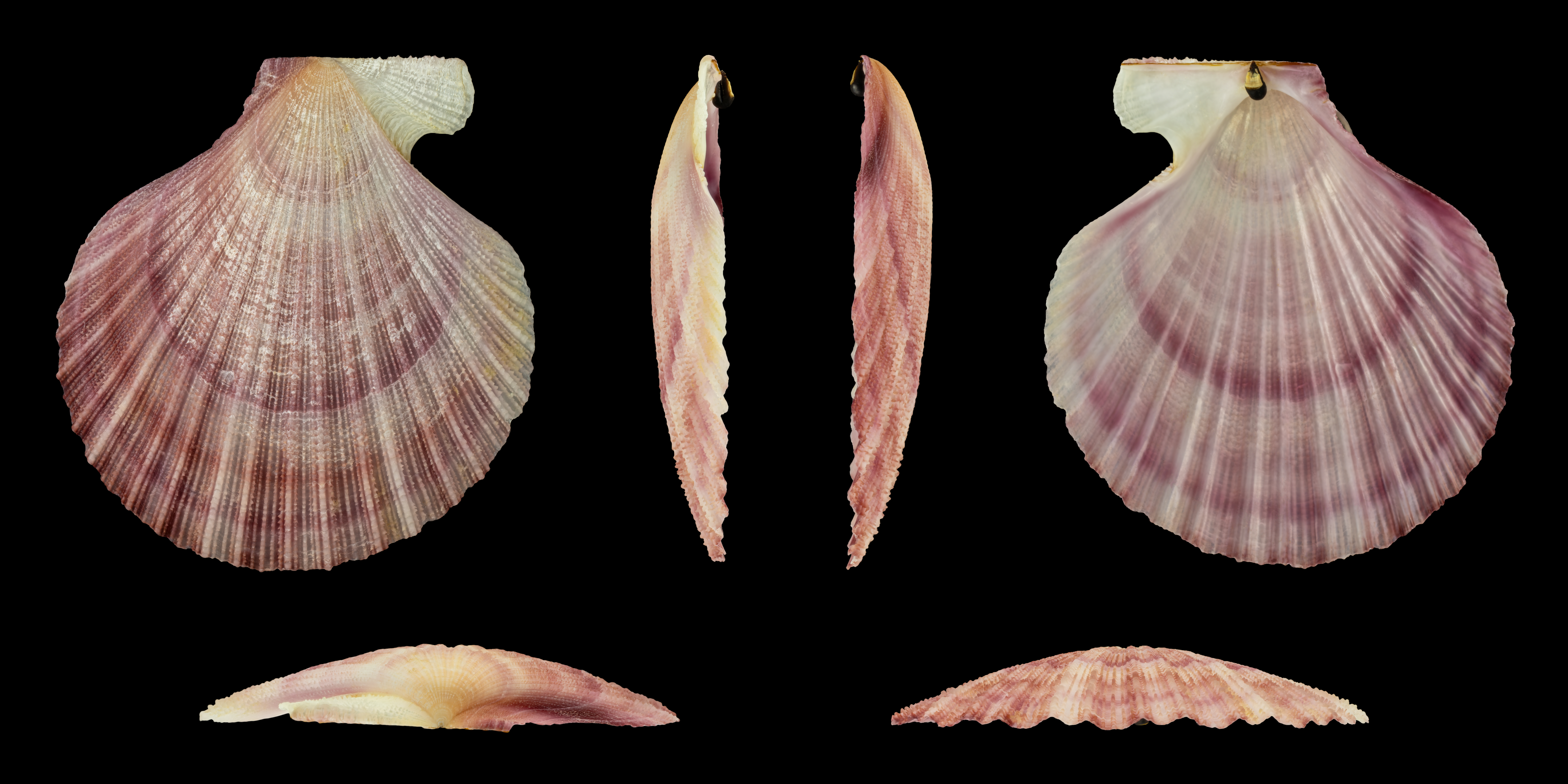
Right valve

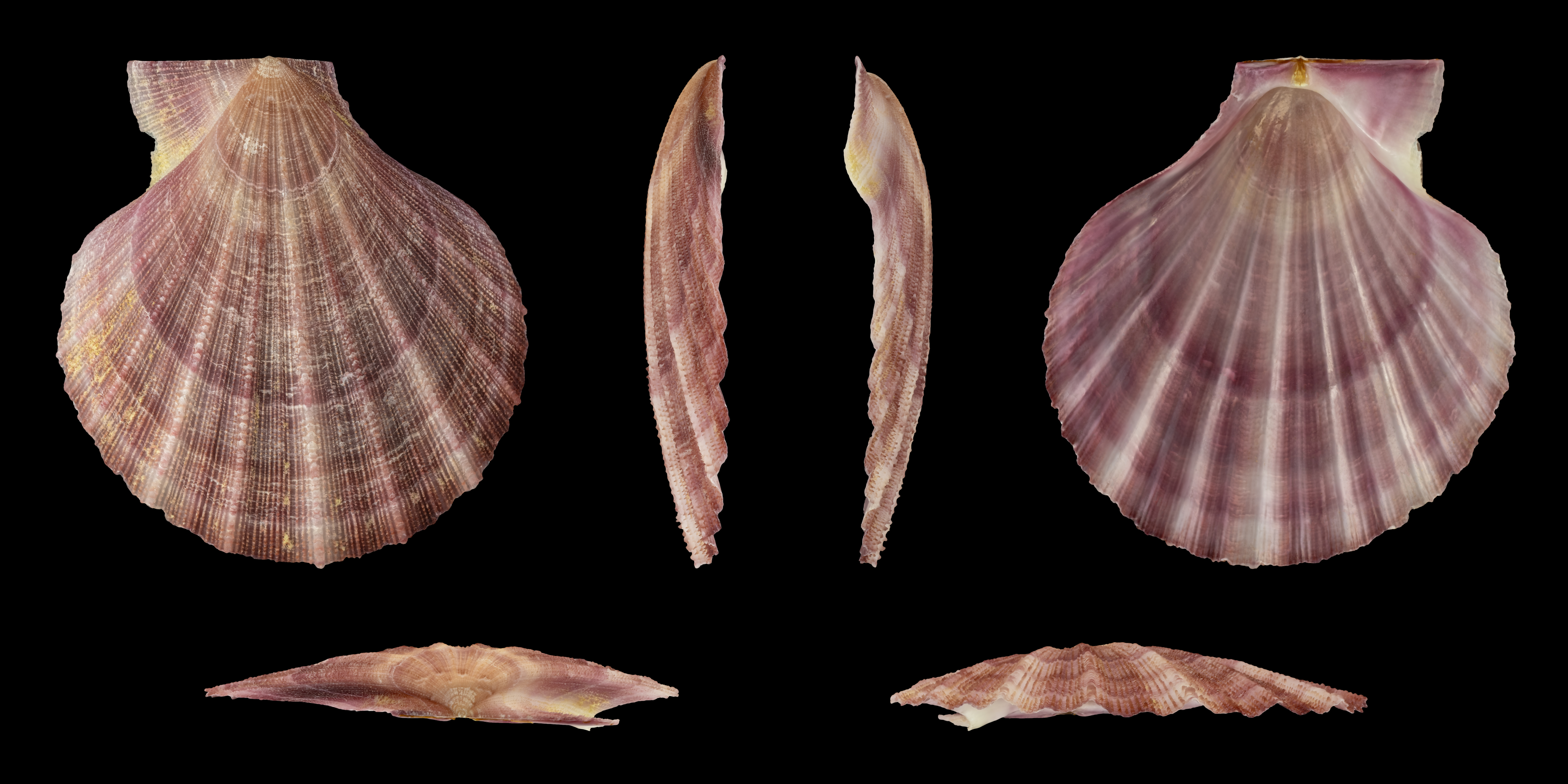
Left valve

== Distribution and habitat ==
The spiny scallop occurs naturally on the west coast of North America. Its range extends from the Gulf of Alaska to San Diego in southern California. It is found on the seabed in areas of sand, gravel or crushed shell and among boulders to a depth of about 150 metres (490 ft). It is also known from seagrass meadows and rocky shores and favours locations with high currents.

== Biology ==
The spiny scallop anchors itself to the substrate with a few byssus threads. It is unclear what the purpose of these is but they may serve to help orient the scallop with regard to the current for optimal feeding. Another possibility is that they may angle the scallop ready for a quick getaway. They are easily broken when the scallop starts to swim. It is a filter feeder. It exposes its mantle by separating its valves and passes water through its gills by ciliary action. A large scallop can process about 4 litres of water an hour per gram of its weight. Phytoplankton are sieved from the water by the gills and moved to the mouth in ciliated grooves. Here they are sorted by a pair of labial palps (mouth appendages), before being ingested. Rejected particles are formed into mucous-wrapped blobs. These are ejected from the mantle cavity at intervals along with the faeces by a rapid clapping of the valves. When the gonads are ripening, a raised level of microalgae in the diet has been found to increase gonadal development. At this time, glycogen storage in the main adductor muscle is depleted as energy is transferred from there to the gonads.

When the spiny scallop's valves are parted for feeding and respiration, many tentacles protrude from each edge of the mantle. The longer ones have sensitive chemoreceptor cells at their tip which can taste the water and allow the mollusc to react appropriately to, for example, the "smell" of a starfish, by taking evasive action. The shorter ones, forming a ring all the way round the edge of the mantle, have simple eyes at their tips. Each eye contains a lens, two retinas and a concave spherical mirror. The eyes cannot see objects but can detect the difference between light and darkness, enabling the valves to be snapped shut if some large, threatening object looms nearby. They also seem to be able to detect the size and speed of particles moving past the bivalve in the current, enabling it to open its valves wide to feed when conditions are suitable.

Spiny scallops are dioecious, individuals being either male or female. They become mature at about 2 years old and usually live for about 4 years. Breeding takes place in the summer. Gametes are released into the water column and fertilisation is external. Veliger larvae begin to develop from the eggs in about 2 days and drift with the plankton for 40 days, growing to a maximum valve length of 240μ (0.01 inch). The larvae have a tuft of broad, compound cilia near the mouth. The velum, the locomotory and feeding organ, has bands of cilia running down it. The simple eyes and rudimentary gills start developing on about the 25th day. The foot becomes visible on the 15th day and the propodium (the projecting front end of the foot) develops on about the 28th. By the 34th day, the larva is crawling about using its foot and its cilia. Metamorphosis takes place on about the 40th day. Over the course of 48 hours, the internal organs undergo a 90° rotation, the valves, hinge and ligament appear and the gills lengthen. A swimming veliger larva has become a benthic juvenile scallop.

== Ecology ==
Animals that feed on the spiny scallop include starfish, particularly the ochre star (Pisaster ochraceus) and the sunflower star (Pycnopodia helianthoides), octopuses and sea otters. The scallop can swim and does so to escape from predators, repeatedly opening and shutting its valves in a clapping action. Each time the valves close, water is expelled through a gap in the mantle on the dorsal side of the hinge and the animal moves margin first, a form of jet propulsion. It has chemoreceptors on the mantle margins which detect the approach of a starfish and enable it to take evasive action. It also responds in this way to predators that feed on sponges, such as nudibranchs of the genus Archidoris spp..

The spiny scallop usually has a symbiotic relationship with an encrusting sponge which grows on its left valve. This is most often the orange Myxilla incrustans but is sometimes the purple or brown Mycale adhaerens. The sponge provides camouflage for the scallop and may deter predators from attacking it as sponges often produce a repulsive odour and tend to be distasteful. It also makes it more difficult for a starfish to get the strong grip with its tube feet that it needs to force the two valves of the scallop apart. The sponge benefits from the fact that living on the scallop prevents it from being buried in sediment. In the wild it has been found that the scallops and their encrusting sponges both grow to a larger size in areas of high turbidity. A laboratory study showed that, in conditions where the sediment was frequently stirred up, sponges on empty scallop shells all died while those on living shells flourished. However, another study showed that growth rates in scallops heavily encrusted by sponges were significantly lower than in unencumbered ones.

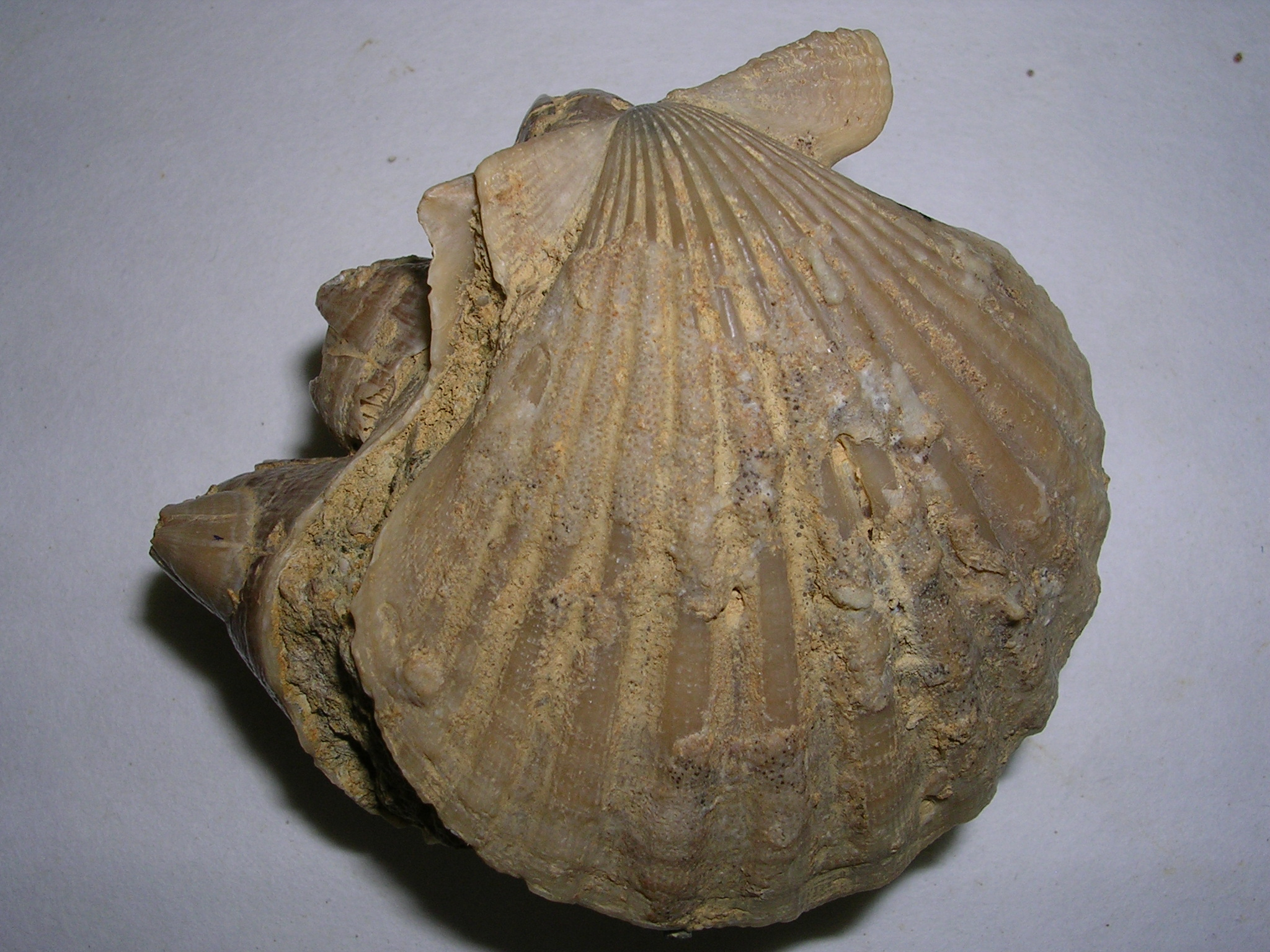
Fossil scallop

Other organisms also grow on the scallop's shell. The boring sponge Cliona celata is a parasitic species which makes holes up to 1.5 millimetres (0.059 in) diameter in the valve. Other common epibionts living on the surface of the valve include tube worms, barnacles and bryozoans. In a survey undertaken off San Juan Islands, Washington, 144 scallops, C. hastata and C. rubida were dredged up, mostly from a depth of 90 metres (300 ft). The right valve was much more heavily colonised than the left with 76% clad with epibionts as against 17% of the left valves. The encrusting sponges (mostly Mycale adhaerens) were common as were the barnacle (Balanus rostratus) and the tube worms Neosabellaria cementarium, Serpula vermicularis and Spirorbis sp. Also encountered were other bivalves, bryozoans, brachiopods and tunicates. Many of the tubes made by the worms were unoccupied and other organisms overgrew living and dead calcareous tubes. On the lower, left valve, cyclostome and cheilostome bryozoans predominated. Starfish seem equally able to force open the valves of a scallop with barnacles on it as one with none.

Barnacles are normally sessile animals unable to evade predators. When they are attached to a scallop they benefit from the defence response of the mollusc to threats which enables it to avoid predation. The scallop is disadvantaged because the presence of barnacles may reduce its ability to swim. It has been found that encrusting sponges emit chemicals that discourage barnacle larvae from settling nearby. The larvae preferentially settle on shells that are not encrusted with sponges. This is another way in which encrusting sponges are of advantage to the scallops which are less impeded in their ability to swim by sponges than they are by barnacles.

== Fishery ==
Some harvesting of scallops under exploratory fishing licences is done off the west coast of Canada, though a previous commercial scallop fishery has been discontinued. Methods used are diving and small trawls with a maximum width of 2 metres (6 ft 7 in). Minimum size limits are set for the height of the shells, 80 millimetres (3.1 in) for the spiny scallop and 71 millimetres (2.8 in) for the pink scallop. A framework research document was published by Fisheries and Oceans Canada in 2000 which made recommendations on the development of the dive and trawl fisheries.
