= Chlamys asper =

Scientific classification
- Kingdom: Animalia
- Phylum: Mollusca
- Class: Bivalvia
- Order: Pectinida
- Family: Pectinidae
- Genus: Chlamys
- Species: C. asper

Binomial name
- Chlamys asper (Lamarck, 1819)

Extinct species of bivalve

Chlamys asper is an extinct species of saltwater scallop, a fossil marine bivalve mollusc in the family Pectinidae, the scallops. This species was described by Lamarck in 1819 under the name Pecten asper. The fossils date from the period of the Pliocene to Pleistocene in Malaysia and Miocene in Indonesia.
