= Mycale grandis =

Scientific classification
- Kingdom: Animalia
- Phylum: Porifera
- Class: Demospongiae
- Order: Poecilosclerida
- Family: Mycalidae
- Genus: Mycale
- Species: M. g.

Binomial name
- Mycale grandis Gray, 1867

Synonyms
- Mycale (Aegogropila) grandis Gray, 1867

Species of sponge

Mycale grandis, the orange keyhole sponge, is a species of marine demosponge in the family Mycalidae. Mycale is a large genus and this species is placed in the subgenus Mycale making its full name, Mycale (Mycale) grandis.

== Description ==
Mycale grandis is a bright orange colour both outside and inside. It forms encrusting masses which can reach 1 metre (3 ft 3 in) across and 0.5 metres (1 ft 8 in) thick. The consistency is compressible but firm and fibrous and the sponge can be torn. The surface is smooth and undulating. There are a few large openings called oscula and a greater number of smaller openings called ostia. Water is drawn in through the oscula and expelled through the ostia after having had minute food particles removed by specialised cells. The inside of the sponge is hollow and often contains small brittle stars.

== Distribution and habitat ==
The native range of Mycale grandis is Australia, Indonesia, Malaysia and India. It has spread to Mexico and to Hawaii where it is considered an invasive species. It is part of the fouling community and is found on man made structures such as harbour walls, wharves and pilings and in disturbed habitats such as freshly dredged channels and lagoons.

== Invasiveness ==
In Hawaii, Mycale grandis was first reported from Pearl Harbor in 1996. Since then it has moved out of its normal habitats and is also found on reef slopes in Kāne'ohe Bay where it is overgrowing and suppressing native coral species such as Montipora capitata and Porites compressa. A study that took place from 2004 onwards found that it was spreading to further sites. Attempts were made to remove the sponges mechanically but the results were equivocal; regrowth of the sponges occurred and the corals were damaged inadvertently. Further trials included the injection of compressed air into the sponges. This proved more successful.
