= Mycale hentscheli =

Scientific classification
- Kingdom: Animalia
- Phylum: Porifera
- Class: Demospongiae
- Order: Poecilosclerida
- Family: Mycalidae
- Genus: Mycale
- Species: M. hentscheli

Binomial name
- Mycale hentscheli Bergquist & Fromont, 1988

Species of sponge

Mycale hentscheli is a marine sponge, which is known to be a rich source of bioactive small molecules. These natural products originate from the sponge's microbiota. Examples of these molecules include the potent cytotoxic polyketides: pateamine, peloruside, and mycalamide.
