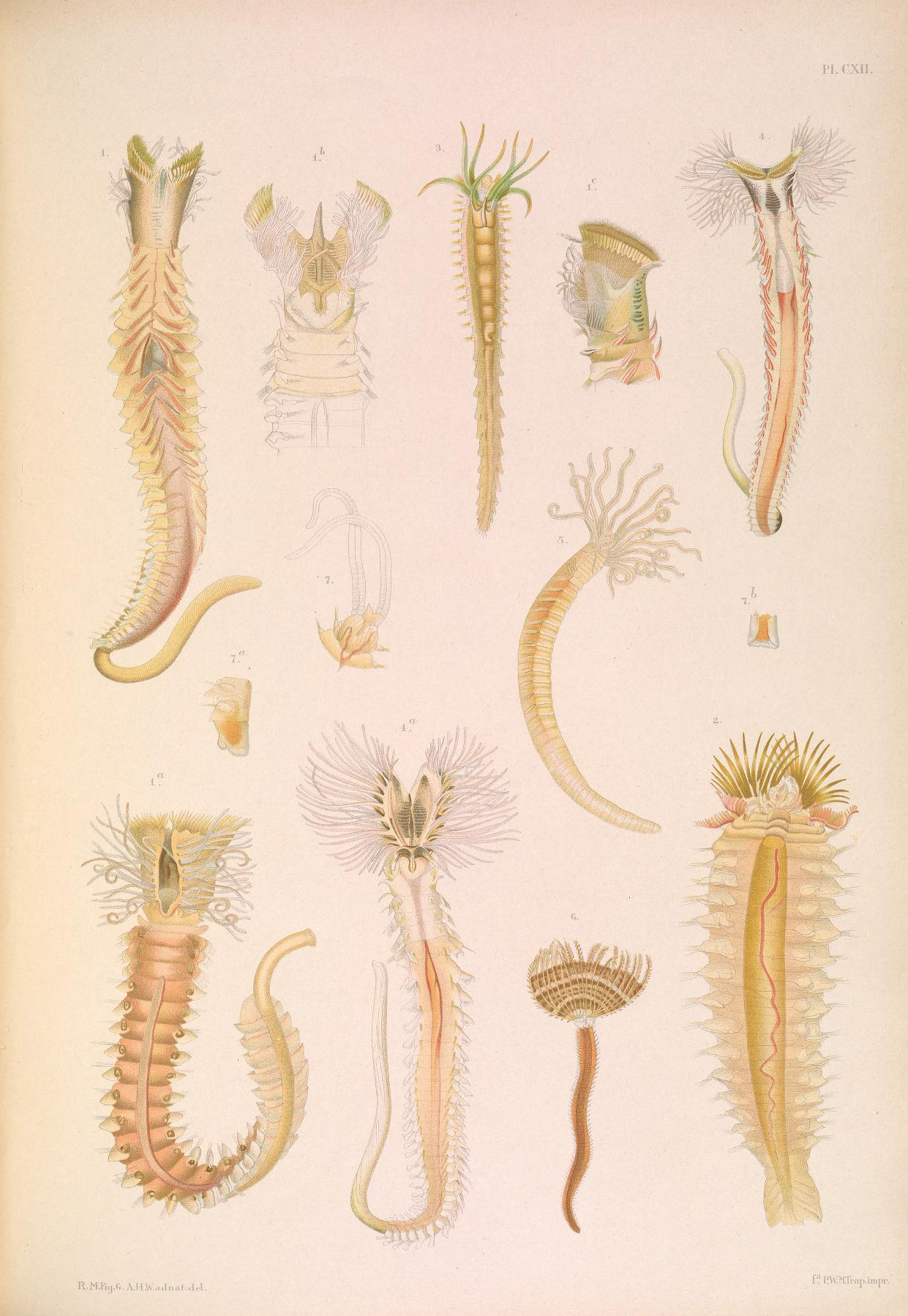
- Sabellaria spinulosa figure 1

Scientific classification
- Kingdom: Animalia
- Phylum: Annelida
- Clade: Pleistoannelida
- Clade: Sedentaria
- Family: Sabellariidae
- Genus: Sabellaria
- Species: S. spinulosa

Binomial name
- Sabellaria spinulosa Leuckart, 1849

Synonyms
- Alveolaria lumbricalis Leach in Johnston, 1865; Hermella ostrearia Frey & Leuckart, 1847; Sabellaria lumbricalis Johnston, 1865; Sabellaria spinulosa bahusiensis Johansson, 1927; Sabellaria spinulosa ensifera McIntosh, 1913

= Sabellaria spinulosa =

Species of annelid

Sabellaria spinulosa is a species of marine polychaete worm in the family Sabellariidae, commonly known as the Ross worm. It lives in a tube built of sand, gravel and pieces of shell.

== Description ==
Sabellaria spinulosa lives in a tube made of shell fragments and coarse sand cemented together with mucus. The tube has a circular cross section and can be closed by an operculum formed by bristles growing on the head of the worm. There are several thoracic segments and the abdomen has many segments that have hooked bristles on raised lobes. The worm's distinguishing features include three thoracic segments with paired chaetal sheaths, pointed opercular chaetae and an outer layer of serrated chaetae.

== Distribution ==
Sabellaria spinulosa is found round the coasts of the British Isles, in the sublittoral zone and occasionally in the intertidal zone. It is also found in other regions of the north east Atlantic Ocean south to Portugal and the Mediterranean Sea.

== Biology ==
Sabellaria spinulosa is a filter feeder, extending its feeding tentacles to catch plankton and detritus that are brought within its reach by the current. Individual worms are either male or female. In the English Channel, spawning mostly takes place between January and March and the larvae became part of the zooplankton. Development of the larvae take 4 to 8 weeks before they settle and undergo metamorphosis and start building tubes. The worms live for 2 to 5 years, or possibly for as long as 9 years.

The worms are very tolerant of adverse conditions such as polluted water, low salinity or low oxygen levels. They favour localities where currents or waves churn up sand but they need a hard substrate to get established. The larvae are strongly attracted to settle in areas where adults are already living or other larvae have settled, but if, after 2 months, the larvae have not found such a place, they settle independently. Shells of the scallop Pecten maximus also attracted larvae to a lesser extent. Larvae of S. alveolata were attracted to settle near adult S. spinulosa but not vice versa.

== Ecology ==
Sabellaria spinulosa usually lives singly in a tube attached to the substrate over its entire length. In much of its range it does not forms reefs in the same way as the closely related honeycomb worm, Sabellaria alveolata. When the worms are crowded together the tubes may stand up vertically and form crusts or mounds several metres across. Unaggregated individuals may reach population densities of 300 per square metre (10sq ft), and population densities of 4000 individuals per square metre have been recorded in loose aggregations. However, under a narrow set of environmental circumstances, reefs are formed. These include: sand or gravel sea floor, the edges of sandbanks, the edges of channels and drop-offs, high turbidity, high sediment load, moderate currents and moderate suspended organic particulate load. Where reefs exist, they provide a biodiverse habitat for a large number of invertebrates and juvenile fish. They are often dominated by the presence of crustaceans, especially the porcelain crab (Pisidia longicornis) and the pink shrimp (Pandalus montagui), which feed on the worms and on other invertebrates which shelter in the reefs. Another frequent resident is the queen scallop (Aequipecten opercularis).

The reefs are at risk from trawling and other human activities that disturb the seabed. For example, in the Wadden Sea, trawling for pink shrimp (Pandalus montagui) broke up the reefs and destroyed the fishery as well.
