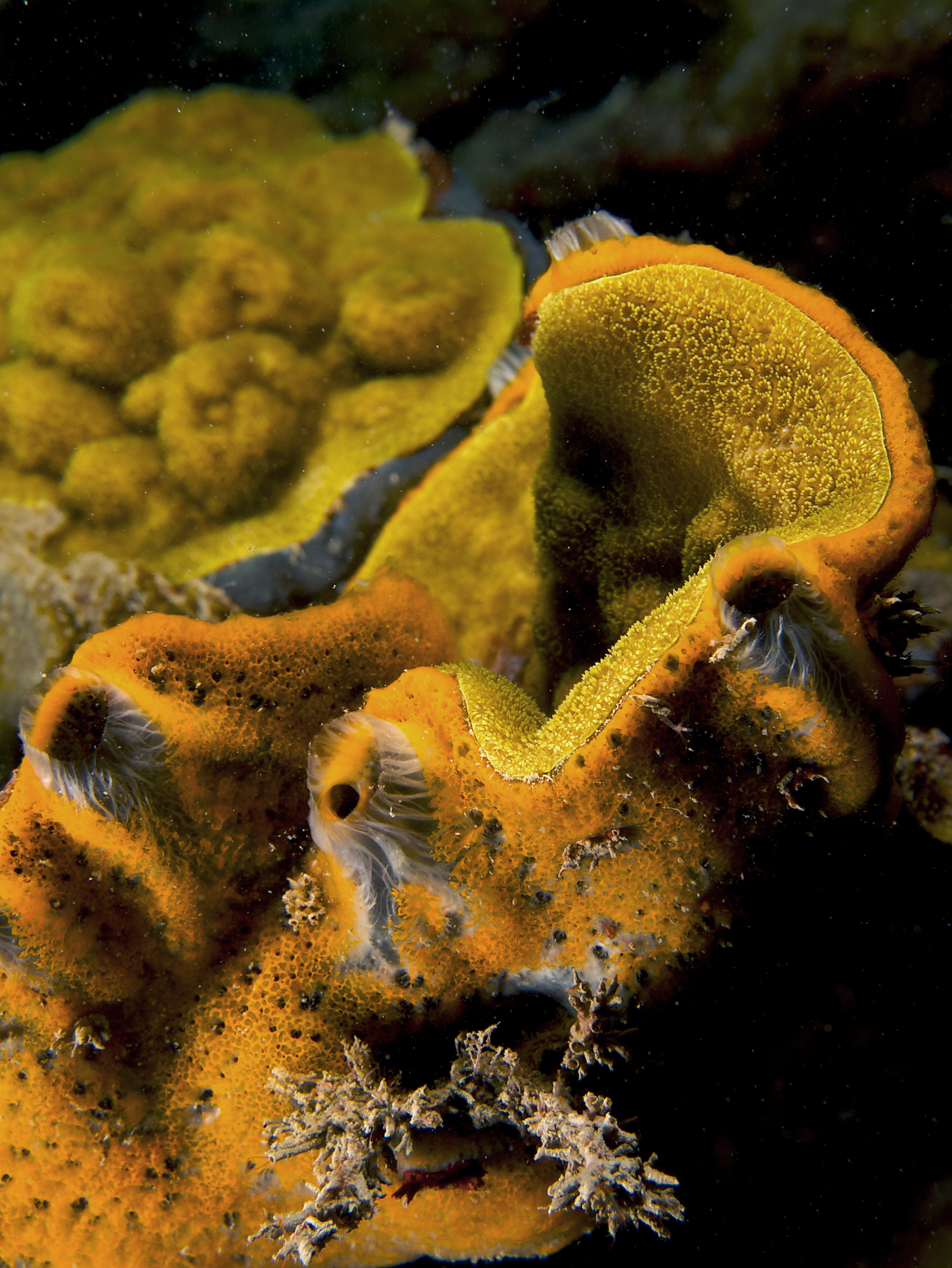
- Mycale laevis growing under a hard coral

Scientific classification
- Kingdom: Animalia
- Phylum: Porifera
- Class: Demospongiae
- Order: Poecilosclerida
- Family: Mycalidae
- Genus: Mycale
- Species: M. laevis

Binomial name
- Mycale laevis (Carter, 1882)

Synonyms
- Esperia laevis Carter, 1882; Oxymycale strongylata Pulitzer-Finali, 1986

= Mycale laevis =

Species of demosponge

Mycale laevis, the orange icing sponge or orange undercoat sponge, is a species of marine demosponge in the family Mycalidae. Mycale is a large genus and this species is placed in the subgenus Mycale making its full name, Mycale (Mycale) laevis. This sponge is found in the Caribbean Sea and the Gulf of Mexico and usually grows in association with a small group of coral genera.

== Description ==
Mycale laevis is yellow, mid to dark orange or yellowish-green. It has a small number of oscules, each up to 4 millimetres (0.16 in) in diameter. They are elevated with a thick opaque to translucent white collar. This sponge is easily torn but is of firm texture.

== Ecology ==
Mycale laevis usually grows on the undersurface of certain species of corals that form flat plates. These include various species of Orbicella, Montastraea, Porites, Agaricia and Mycetophilia. The sponge seems able to cause the rim of the coral to fold and become lobed and grows into the gaps between the lobes. Often the sponge is found covering the under side of an entire groups of colonial corals. It is unclear what is the precise relationship between the coral and the sponge but the latter may benefit from being held clear of the substrate while the coral may avoid becoming a host to a parasitic boring sponge. Observation over several years has shown that this is a stable relationship. In the absence of suitable coral species, Mycale laevis is able to live directly on rocks and under boulders as an encrusting or massive sponge and also on calcareous worm tubes.

== Distribution ==
Mycale laevis is found on reefs in the Caribbean Sea, the Gulf of Mexico, the West Indies, the Bahamas and Florida at depths between 1 and 80 metres (3.3 and 262.5 ft) but is more common at depths greater than 25 metres (82 ft).
