= Idanthyrsus (annelid) =

Scientific classification
- Kingdom: Animalia
- Phylum: Annelida
- Clade: Pleistoannelida
- Clade: Sedentaria
- Family: Sabellariidae
- Genus: Idanthyrsus; Kinberg, 1866

Genus of annelids

Idanthyrsus is a genus of marine polychaete worms in the family Sabellariidae with 29 recognized species.

== Species ==
Species in Idanthyrsus include:

- Idanthyrsus albigenus
- Idanthyrsus armatopsis
- Idanthyrsus australiensis
- Idanthyrsus bicornis
- Idanthyrsus bihamatus
- Idanthyrsus boninensis
- Idanthyrsus cretus
- Idanthyrsus kornickeri
- Idanthyrsus luciae
- Idanthyrsus macropaleus
- Idanthyrsus manningi
- Idanthyrsus mexicanus
- Idanthyrsus nesos
- Idanthyrsus okinawaensis
- Idanthyrsus okudai
- Idanthyrsus pennatus
- Idanthyrsus saxicavus
- Idanthyrsus sexhamatus
- Idanthyrsus valentinei
- Idanthyrsus willora
- Idanthyrsus abyssalis
- Idanthyrsus armatus
- Idanthyrsus bihamata
- Idanthyrsus glaessneri
- Idanthyrsus ornamentatus
- Idanthyrsus pennata
- Idanthyrsus quadricornis
- Idanthyrsus regalis
- Idanthyrsus varians
