= Neosabellaria =

Scientific classification
- Domain: Eukaryota
- Kingdom: Animalia
- Phylum: Annelida
- Clade: Pleistoannelida
- Clade: Sedentaria
- Family: Sabellariidae
- Genus: Neosabellaria; Kirtley, 1994

Genus of annelids

Neosabellaria is a genus of annelids belonging to the family Sabellariidae.

The species of this genus are found in America, Australia, Eastern Asia.

Species:

- Neosabellaria antipoda (Augener, 1926)
- Neosabellaria cementarium (Moore, 1906)
- Neosabellaria clandestinus (Menon & Sareen, 1966)
- Neosabellaria kaiparaensis (Augener, 1926)
- Neosabellaria rupicaproides (Augener, 1926)
- Neosabellaria uschakovi Kirtley, 1994
