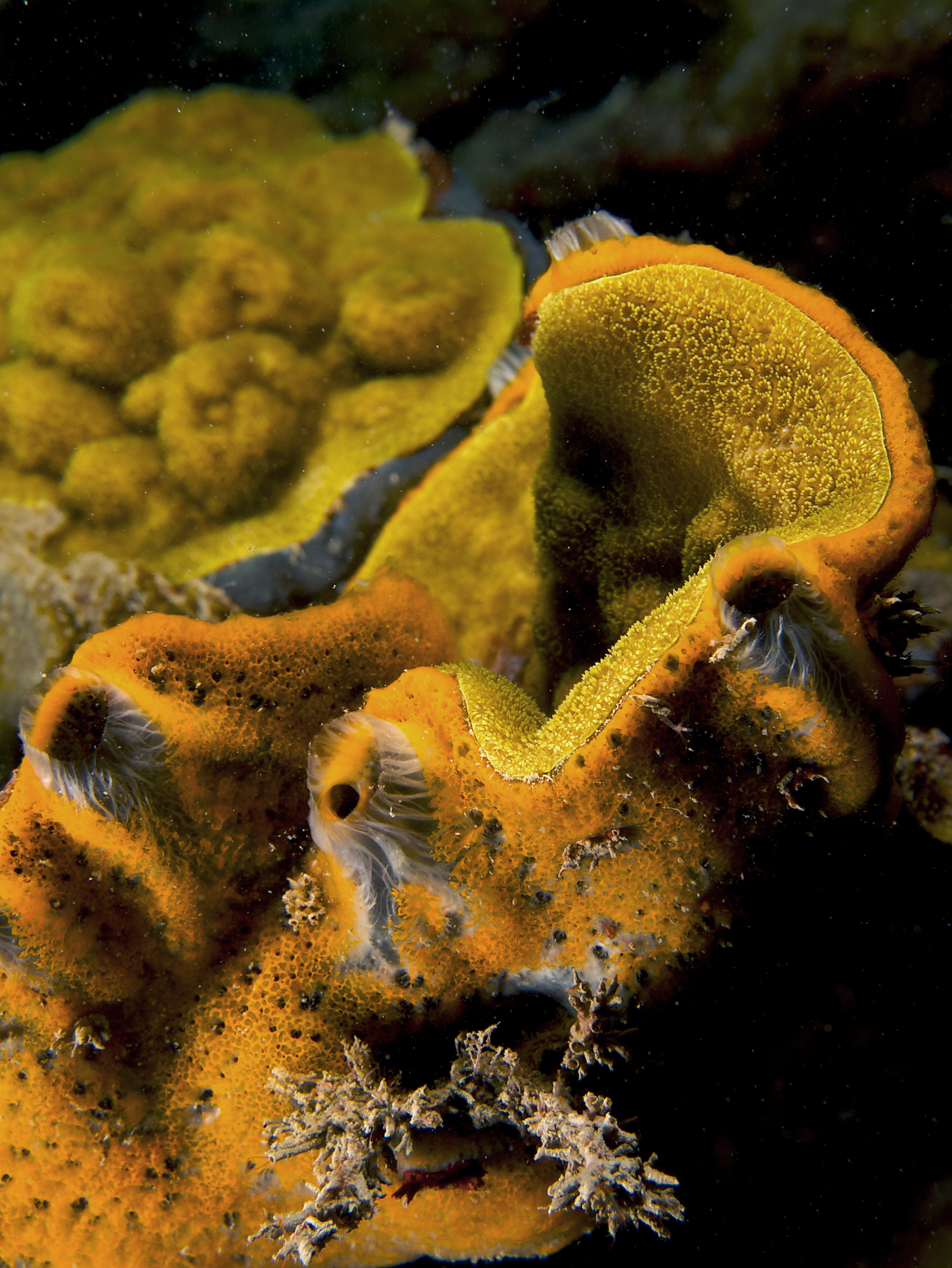
- Orange Icing Sponge (Mycale laevis)

Scientific classification
- Kingdom: Animalia
- Phylum: Porifera
- Class: Demospongiae
- Order: Poecilosclerida
- Family: Mycalidae
- Genus: Mycale; Gray, 1867

= Mycale (sponge) =

Genus of sponges

Mycale is a genus of demosponges with 245 recognised species in 12 subgenera. It has been a large genus with multiple subdivisions since it was first described in 1867.

== Species ==
The following species are recognized in the genus Mycale:

Subgenus Aegogropila Gray, 1867

- Mycale adhaerens (Lambe, 1893)
- Mycale americana van Soest, 1984
- Mycale antiae Urgorri & Díaz-Agras, 2019
- Mycale arndti van Soest, 1984
- Mycale bamfieldensis Reiswig & Kaiser, 1989
- Mycale carmigropila Hajdu & Rützler, 1998
- Mycale cavernosa Bergquist, 1965
- Mycale citrina Hajdu & Rützler, 1998
- Mycale contarenii (Lieberkühn, 1859)
- Mycale corrugata (Bowerbank, 1866)
- Mycale denticulata Bertolino, Calcinai & Pansini, 2009
- Mycale dickinsoni Carballo & Cruz-Barraza, 2010
- Mycale dubia (Czerniavsky, 1880)
- Mycale erythraeana (Row, 1911)
- Mycale escarlatei Hajdu, Zea, Kielman & Peixinho, 1995
- Mycale flagelliformis (Bergquist & Fromont, 1988)
- Mycale furcata Calcinai, Bavestrello, Bertolino, Pica, Wagner & Cerrano, 2013
- Mycale gravelyi Burton, 1937
- Mycale jukdoensis Kang & Sim, 2005
- Mycale kolletae Carballo & Hajdu, 2001
- Mycale lilianae Carballo & Hajdu, 1998
- Mycale magellanica (Ridley, 1881)
- Mycale magnitoxa Carballo & Cruz-Barraza, 2010
- Mycale mannarensis Thomas, 1968
- Mycale nodulosa Goodwin, Jones, Neely & Brickle, 2011
- Mycale orientalis (Topsent, 1897)
- Mycale pachysigmata Pulitzer-Finali, 1996
- Mycale parvasigma Hoshino, 1981
- Mycale phillipensis (Dendy, 1896)
- Mycale plumosa sensu Hoshino, 1981
- Mycale porosa (Ridley & Dendy, 1886)
- Mycale prognatha Van Soest, Aryasari & De Voogd, 2021
- Mycale retifera Topsent, 1924
- Mycale rotalis (Bowerbank, 1874)
- Mycale rubra Cedro, Hajdu & Correia, 2013
- Mycale serpens (Lendenfeld, 1888)
- Mycale simonis (Ridley & Dendy, 1886)
- Mycale sulevoidea (Sollas, 1902)
- Mycale syringosimilis Van Soest, Beglinger & De Voogd, 2014
- Mycale syrinx (Schmidt, 1862)
- Mycale tapetum Samaai & Gibbons, 2005
- Mycale tenerifensis Van Soest, Beglinger & De Voogd, 2014
- Mycale textilis (Whitelegge, 1906)
- Mycale tunicata (Schmidt, 1862)

Subgenus Anomomycale Topsent, 1924

- Mycale titubans (Schmidt, 1870)

Subgenus Arenochalina Lendenfeld, 1887

- Mycale africamucosa Van Soest, Beglinger & De Voogd, 2014
- Mycale anomala (Ridley & Dendy, 1886)
- Mycale aplysilloides (Lendenfeld, 1888)
- Mycale crassa (Dendy, 1896)
- Mycale euplectellioides (Row, 1911)
- Mycale flammula (Lamarck, 1814)
- Mycale imperfecta Baer, 1906
- Mycale incrustans (Burton, 1932)
- Mycale laxissima (Duchassaing & Michelotti, 1864)
- Mycale mirabilis (Lendenfeld, 1887)
- Mycale pluriloba (Lamarck, 1814)
- Mycale rara (Dendy, 1905)
- Mycale regularis Wilson, 1925
- Mycale tenuispiculata (Lamarck, 1814)
- Mycale truncatella (Lendenfeld, 1887)
- Mycale waitei (Whitelegge, 1906)

Subgenus Carmia Gray, 1867

- Mycale amiri Van Soest, Aryasari & De Voogd, 2021
- Mycale atropha Van Soest, Beglinger & De Voogd, 2014
- Mycale babici (Laubenfels, 1936)
- Mycale bolivari Ferrer-Hernandez, 1914
- Mycale carlilei Lehnert, Stone & Heimler, 2006
- Mycale cecilia Laubenfels, 1936
- Mycale cockburniana Hentschel, 1911
- Mycale confundata (de Laubenfels, 1954)
- Mycale contax (Dickinson, 1945)
- Mycale cucumis Koltun, 1958
- Mycale diminuta Sarà, 1978
- Mycale fascibula (Topsent, 1904)
- Mycale fibrexilis (Wilson, 1894)
- Mycale fistulifera (Row, 1911)
- Mycale fungiaphila Van Soest, Aryasari & De Voogd, 2021
- Mycale fusiformis Lévi, 1960
- Mycale guineensis Van Soest, Beglinger & De Voogd, 2014
- Mycale helios (Fristedt, 1887)
- Mycale hentscheli (Bergquist & Fromont, 1988)
- Mycale hispida (Lambe, 1893)
- Mycale ieoensis Kang, Lee & Kim, 2019
- Mycale jophon (Swartschewsky, 1905)
- Mycale lissochela Bergquist, 1965
- Mycale macilenta (Bowerbank, 1866)
- Mycale madraspatana Annandale, 1914
- Mycale magnirhaphidifera van Soest, 1984
- Mycale maunakea de Laubenfels, 1951
- Mycale micracanthoxea Buizer & van Soest, 1977
- Mycale microsigmatosa Arndt, 1927
- Mycale militaris Annandale, 1914
- Mycale minima (Waller, 1880)
- Mycale monomicrosclera Van Soest, Aryasari & De Voogd, 2021
- Mycale murrayi (Ridley & Dendy, 1886)
- Mycale mytilorum Annandale, 1914
- Mycale nullarosette Hoshino, 1981
- Mycale phyllophila Hentschel, 1911
- Mycale pulvinus Samaai & Gibbons, 2005
- Mycale raphidiophora Hentschel, 1911
- Mycale relicta Annandale, 1924
- Mycale rhaphidotoxa Hentschel, 1912
- Mycale richardsoni Bakus, 1966
- Mycale samaaii Van Soest & Hooper, 2020
- Mycale sanguinea Tsurnamal, 1969
- Mycale senegalensis Lévi, 1952
- Mycale stegoderma (de Laubenfels, 1954)
- Mycale subclavata (Bowerbank, 1866)
- Mycale suezza (Row, 1911)
- Mycale tasmani (Bergquist & Fromont, 1988)
- Mycale tenuichela Van Soest, Aryasari & De Voogd, 2021
- Mycale tenuis Sarà, 1978
- Mycale tenuisinuousitylostyli Hoshino, 1981
- Mycale toxifera (Dendy, 1896)
- Mycale tubiporicola Van Soest, Aryasari & De Voogd, 2021
- Mycale tydemani Van Soest, Aryasari & De Voogd, 2021
- Mycale urizae Carballo & Hajdu, 1998
- Mycale vermistyla Li, 1986

Subgenus Grapelia Gray, 1867

- Mycale ancorina (Whitelegge, 1906)
- Mycale australis (Gray, 1867)
- Mycale burtoni Hajdu, 1995
- Mycale carteri (Dendy & Frederick, 1924)
- Mycale menylloides Hajdu, 1995
- Mycale trichophora (Dendy & Frederick, 1924)
- Mycale unguifera Hajdu, Zea, Kielman & Peixinho, 1995
- Mycale vaceleti Hajdu, 1995
- Mycale vansoesti Hajdu, 1995

Subgenus Kerasemna Pulitzer-Finali, 1982

- Mycale humilis (Thiele, 1903)
- Mycale tenuityla (Pulitzer-Finali, 1982)

Subgenus Mycale Gray, 1867

- Mycale alagoana Cedro, Hajdu & Correia, 2011
- Mycale anisochela Lévi, 1963
- Mycale arctica (Fristedt, 1887)
- Mycale arenaria Hajdu & Desqueyroux-Faúndez, 1994
- Mycale arenicola (Ridley & Dendy, 1886)
- Mycale armata Thiele, 1903
- Mycale asigmata Van Soest, Aryasari & De Voogd, 2021
- Mycale beatrizae Hajdu & Desqueyroux-Faúndez, 1994
- Mycale bouryesnaultae Van Soest, Aryasari & De Voogd, 2021
- Mycale brownorum Goodwin, Brewin & Brickle, 2012
- Mycale cartwrighti Goodwin, Brewin & Brickle, 2012
- Mycale chujaensis Kang & Sim, 2005
- Mycale crassissima (Dendy, 1905)
- Mycale cylindrica (Whitelegge, 1906)
- Mycale darwini Hajdu & Desqueyroux-Faúndez, 1994
- Mycale dendyi (Row, 1911)
- Mycale diaphana (Schmidt, 1870)
- Mycale digitata Bergquist & Tizard, 1867
- Mycale doellojuradoi Burton, 1940
- Mycale ernsthentscheli Van Soest & Hooper, 2020
- Mycale gaussiana Hentschel, 1914
- Mycale gelatinosa (Ridley, 1884)
- Mycale geojensis Sim & Lee, 2001
- Mycale grandis Gray, 1867
- Mycale grandoides Van Soest, Aryasari & De Voogd, 2021
- Mycale immitis (Schmidt, 1870)
- Mycale incurvata Lévi, 1993
- Mycale izuensis Tanita & Hoshino, 1989
- Mycale indica (Carter, 1887)
- Mycale japonica Koltun, 1959
- Mycale jasoniae Lehnert, Stone & Heimler, 2006
- Mycale laevis (Carter, 1882)
- Mycale lapidiformis (Ridley & Dendy, 1886)
- Mycale lindbergi Koltun, 1958
- Mycale lingua (Bowerbank, 1866)
- Mycale lobos Turner & Lonhart, 2023
- Mycale longistyla Koltun, 1958
- Mycale lorea Dinn et al., 2023
- Mycale loveni (Fristedt, 1887)
- Mycale macginitiei de Laubenfels, 1930
- Mycale mammiformis (Ridley & Dendy, 1886)
- Mycale massa (Schmidt, 1862)
- Mycale mauricei Van Soest, Aryasari & De Voogd, 2021
- Mycale meridionalis Lévi, 1963
- Mycale multisclera Pulitzer-Finali, 1993
- Mycale myriasclera Lévi & Lévi, 1983
- Mycale novaezealandiae Dendy, 1924
- Mycale ochotensis Koltun, 1959
- Mycale paschalis Desqueyroux-Faúndez, 1990
- Mycale profunda Koltun, 1964
- Mycale quadripartita Boury-Esnault, 1973
- Mycale salvadorensis Mácola, Nascimento, Pinheiro, Neves & Johnson, 2025
- Mycale sundaminorensis Van Soest, Aryasari & De Voogd, 2021
- Mycale thielei Hajdu & Desqueyroux-Faúndez, 1994
- Mycale toporoki Koltun, 1958
- Mycale topsenti Burton, 1959
- Mycale trichela Lévi, 1963
- Mycale tridens Hentschel, 1914
- Mycale tylota Koltun, 1958

Subgenus Naviculina Gray, 1867

- Mycale arcuiris Lerner & Hajdu, 2002
- Mycale chungae Lerner & Hajdu, 2002
- Mycale cleistochela Vacelet & Vasseur, 1971
- Mycale cliftoni (Gray, 1867)
- Mycale cruzi Van Soest, Beglinger & De Voogd, 2014
- Mycale diastrophochela Lévi, 1969
- Mycale diversisigmata (van Soest, 1984)
- Mycale mascarenensis Van Soest, Aryasari & De Voogd, 2021
- Mycale microxea Vacelet, Vasseur & Lévi, 1976
- Mycale neunggulensis Sim & Kang, 2004
- Mycale obscura (Carter, 1882)
- Mycale oxeata Mácola, Nascimento, Pinheiro, Neves & Johnson, 2025
- Mycale purpurata Lerner & Hajdu, 2002
- Mycale thaumatochela Lundbeck, 1905
- Mycale ulleungensis Sim & Kang, 2004

Subgenus Oxymycale Hentschel, 1929

- Mycale acerata Kirkpatrick, 1907
- Mycale intermedia (Schmidt, 1874)
- Mycale klausjanusorum Van Soest, 2018
- Mycale koreana (Sim, 1982)
- Mycale paradoxa (de Laubenfels, 1935)
- Mycale renieroides (Schmidt, 1870)
- Mycale rhoi (Sim & Lee, 1998)
- Mycale stephensae Samaai & Gibbons, 2005
- Mycale tylotornota Koltun, 1964

Subgenus Paresperella Dendy, 1905

- Mycale atlantica Stephens, 1917
- Mycale claudei Van Soest & Hooper, 2020
- Mycale curvisigma (Lévi, 1969)
- Mycale dentata Sarà, 1958
- Mycale janvermeuleni Van Soest, Beglinger & De Voogd, 2014
- Mycale levii (Uriz, 1987)
- Mycale macrosigma (Lindgren, 1897)
- Mycale microsigma (Bergquist & Fromont, 1988)
- Mycale moluccensis (Thiele, 1903)
- Mycale penicillium (Lendenfeld, 1888)
- Mycale policuspidifera Mácola, Nascimento, Pinheiro, Neves & Johnson, 2025
- Mycale psila (de Laubenfels, 1930)
- Mycale sceptroides Van Soest, Aryasari & De Voogd, 2021
- Mycale serratohamata (Carter, 1880)
- Mycale serrulata Sarà & Siribelli, 1960
- Mycale seychellensis Van Soest, Aryasari & De Voogd, 2021
- Mycale spinosigma (Boury-Esnault, 1973)
- Mycale undulata (Tanita, 1968)
- Mycale vitellina van Soest, 2009

Subgenus Rhaphidotheca Kent, 1870

- Mycale coronata (Dendy, 1926)
- Mycale ernsti Van Soest & Hooper, 2020
- Mycale loricata (Topsent, 1896)
- Mycale marshallhalli (Kent, 1870)
- Mycale verdensis Van Soest, Beglinger & De Voogd, 2014

Subgenus Zygomycale Topsent, 1930

- Mycale angulosa (Duchassaing & Michelotti, 1864)
- Mycale isochela Hentschel, 1911
- Mycale odoya Mácola, Nascimento, Pinheiro, Neves & Johnson, 2025
- Mycale parishii (Bowerbank, 1875)
- Mycale pectinicola Hentschel, 1911
- Mycale ramulosa Carballo & Cruz-Barrazo, 2010
- Mycale sibogae Van Soest, Aryasari & De Voogd, 2021
- Mycale sierraleonensis Van Soest, Beglinger & De Voogd, 2014

Subgenus unassigned

- Mycale lampra (de Laubenfels, 1954)
- Mycale pluma (Lamarck, 1814)
