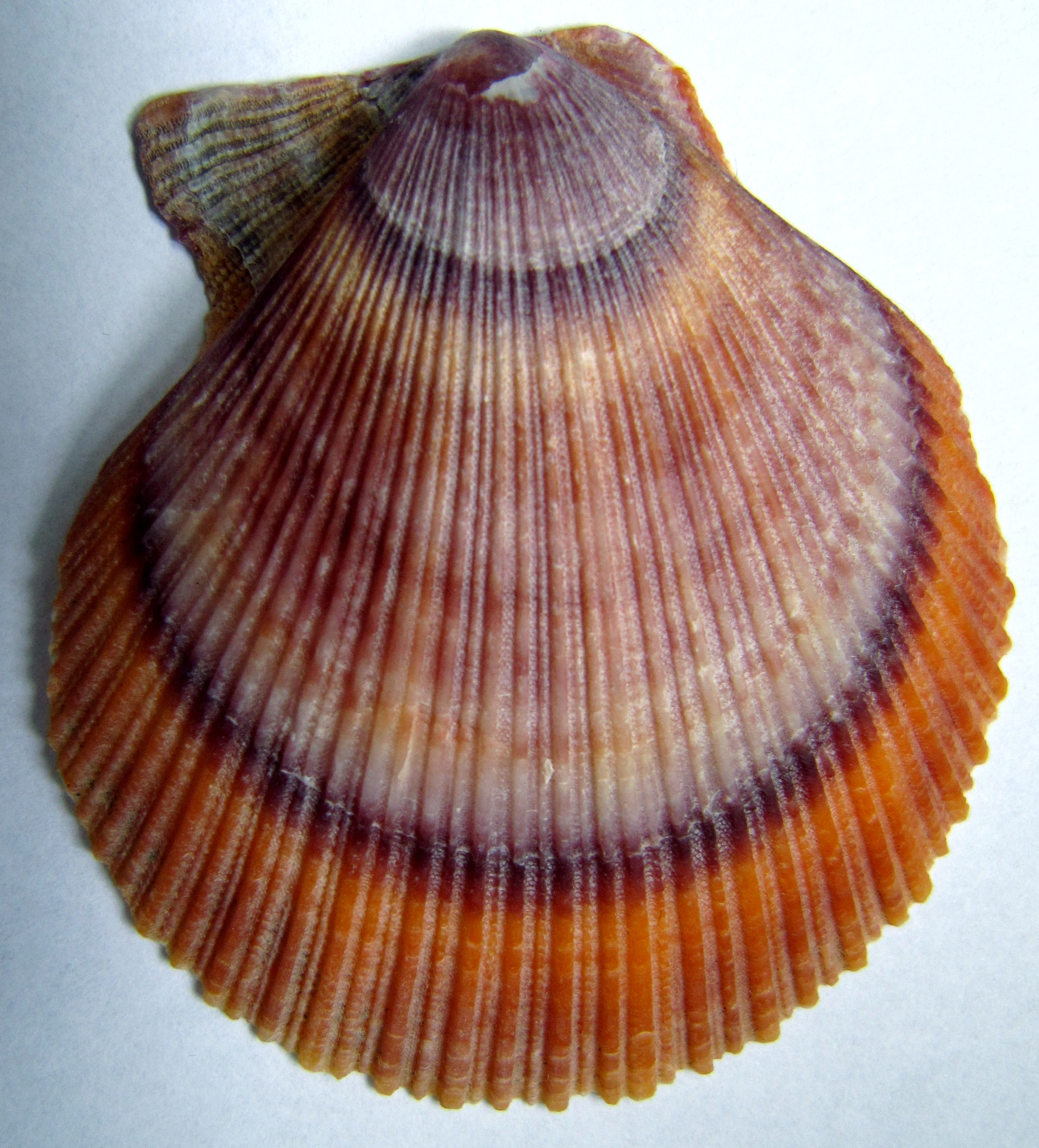

Scientific classification
- Kingdom: Animalia
- Phylum: Mollusca
- Class: Bivalvia
- Order: Pectinida
- Family: Pectinidae
- Genus: Chlamys
- Species: C. islandica

Binomial name
- Chlamys islandica (Muller, 1776)

= Chlamys islandica =

Species of bivalve

Chlamys islandica, the Iceland scallop, is a species of bivalve mollusc in the family Pectinidae.

== Habitat ==
This North Atlantic scallop attaches itself to hard surfaces such as rocks and can be found from the intertidal zone to a depth of 200 m (660 ft).

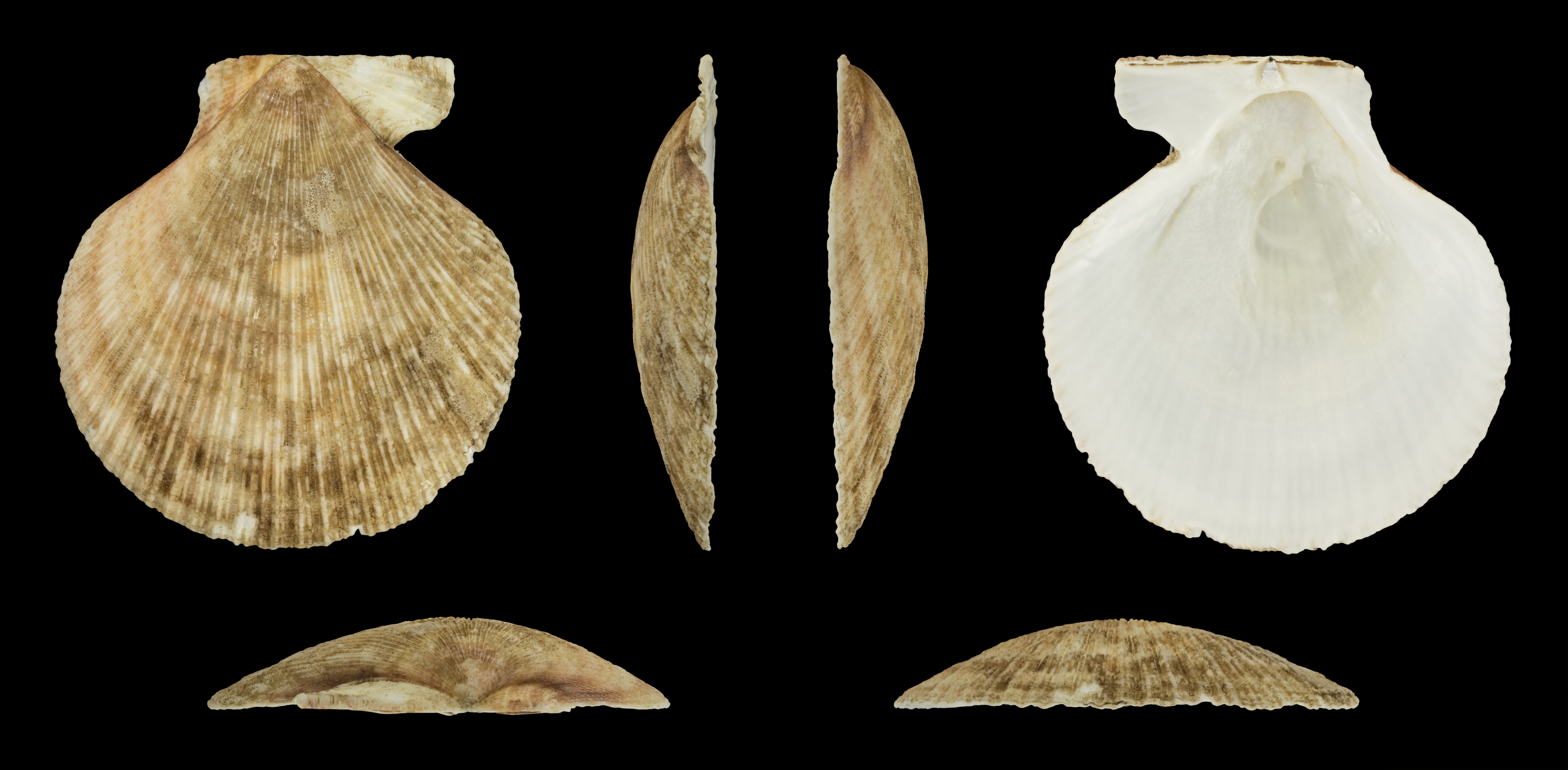
Right valve

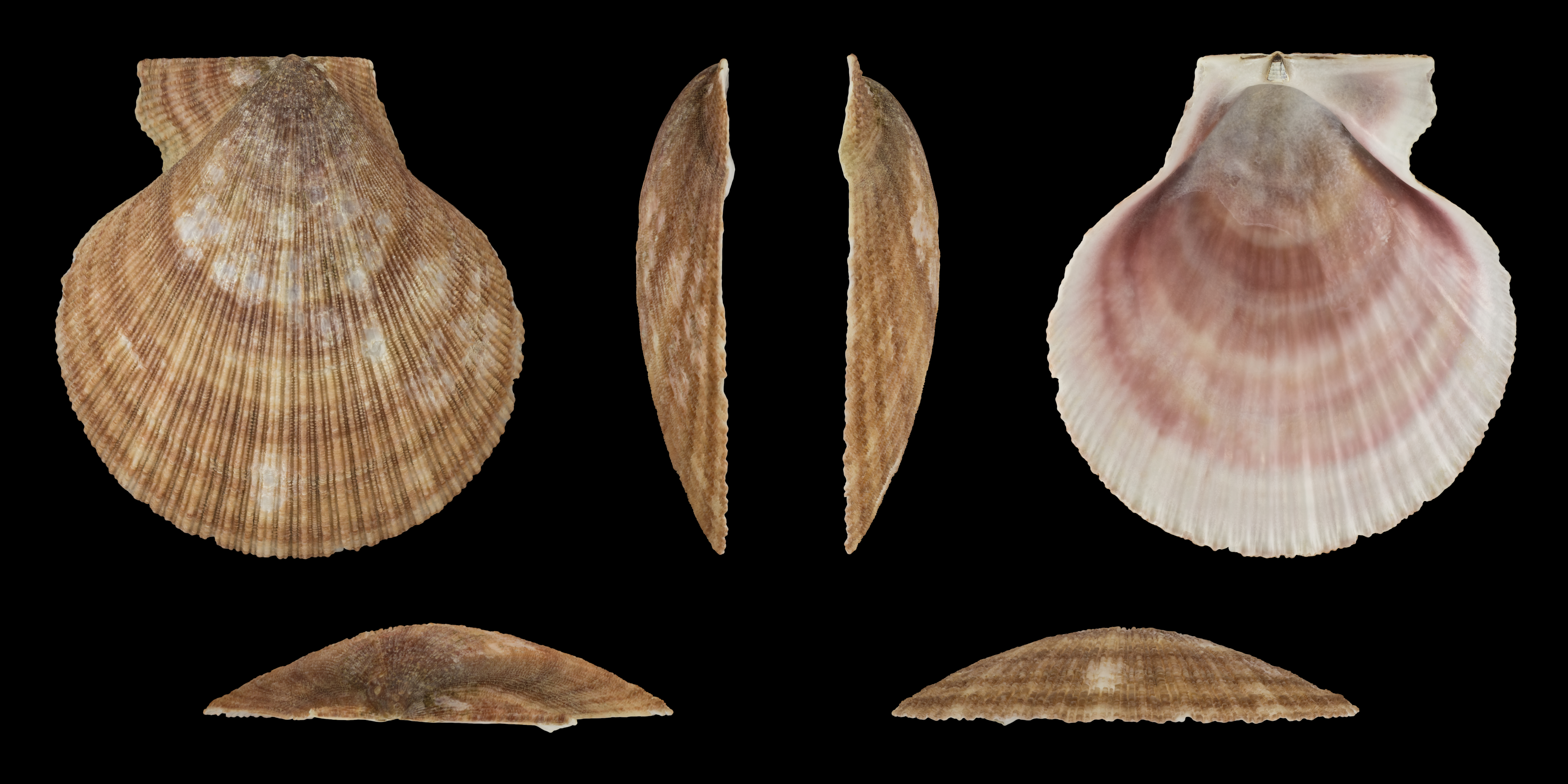
Left valve

== Distribution ==
In the northwest Atlantic Ocean, it ranges from Greenland to Massachusetts and in the northeast from Norway and Iceland to the Faroes. Its shell can be found further south, including the British Isles, as subfossil remains. It is highly variable in colour and can reach a size of 14 cm (5.5 in).
