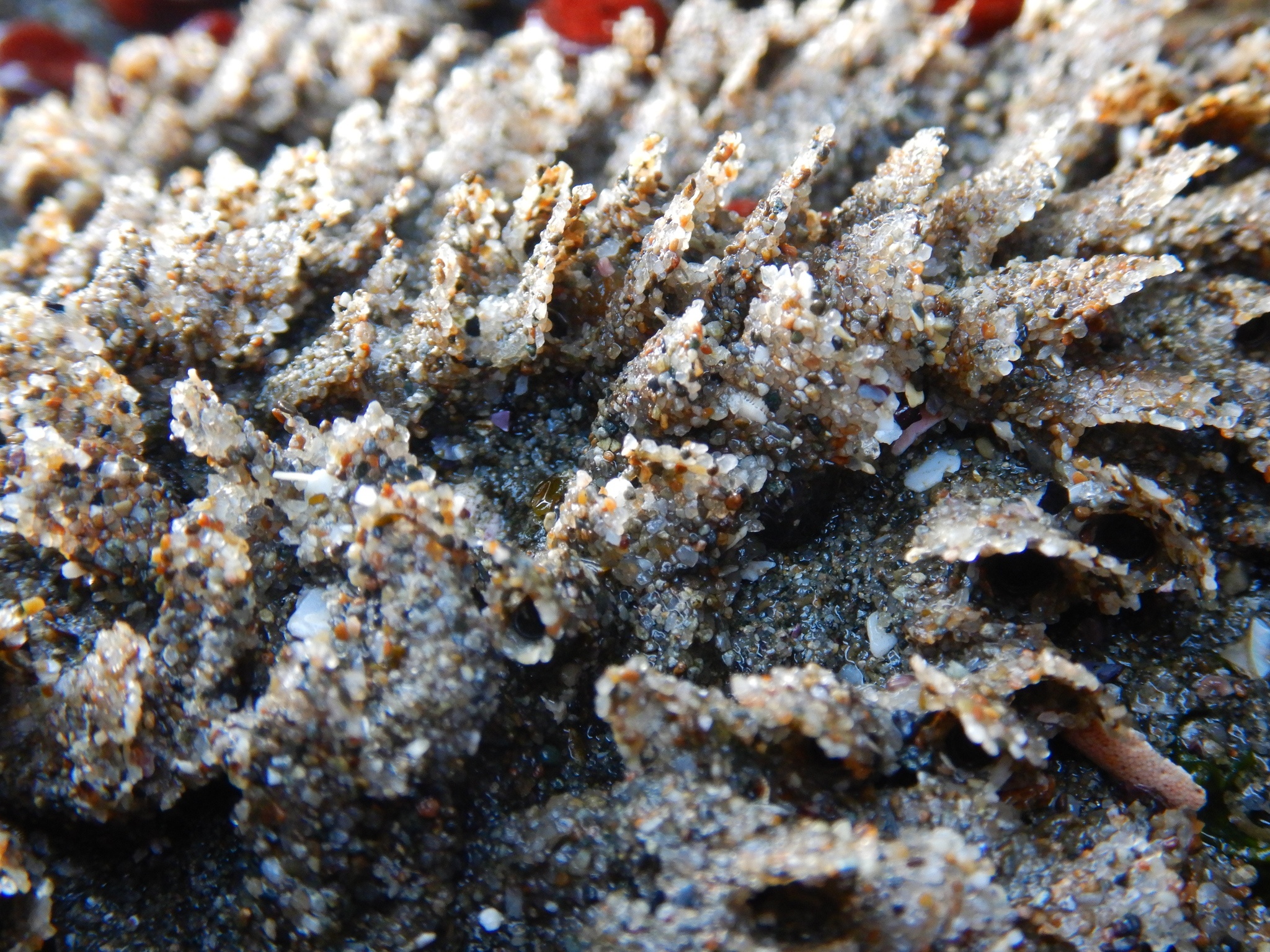
- Phragmatopoma virgini

Scientific classification
- Domain: Eukaryota
- Kingdom: Animalia
- Phylum: Annelida
- Clade: Pleistoannelida
- Clade: Sedentaria
- Family: Sabellariidae
- Genus: Phragmatopoma; Mörch, 1863

= Phragmatopoma =

Genus of annelids

Phragmatopoma is a genus of polychaetes belonging to the family Sabellariidae.

The species of this genus are found in America.

Species:

- Phragmatopoma attenuata Hartman, 1944
- Phragmatopoma balbinae Chávez-López, 2020
- Phragmatopoma californica (Fewkes, 1889)
- Phragmatopoma carlosi Chávez-López, 2020
- Phragmatopoma caudata Krøyer, 1863
- Phragmatopoma digitata Rioja, 1962
- Phragmatopoma moerchi Kinberg, 1866
- Phragmatopoma peruensis Hartman, 1944
- Phragmatopoma villalobosi Chávez-López, 2020
- Phragmatopoma virgini Kinberg, 1866
