= Wicklow Reef =

Shallow subtidal reef in the Irish Sea

- Sceir Cill Mhantáin
- Location within Ireland
- Location: County Wicklow, Ireland
- Coordinates: 52°58′25″N 5°57′25″W
- Area: 3,790 acres (15.3 km^{2})
- Designation: Special Area of Conservation
- Governing body: National Parks and Wildlife Service

The Wicklow Reef (Irish: Sceir Cill Mhantáin) is a shallow subtidal reef in the Irish Sea, located off the coast of County Wicklow, Ireland, approximately 2.88 kilometres (1.79 mi) northeast of Wicklow Head. The reefs are constructed by the honeycomb worm (Sabellaria alveolata) and are located at a depth of 12 to 30 metres (39 to 98 ft).

Prior to the discovery of the Wicklow Reef in 1997, Sabellaria alveolata reefs were only known to occur in inter-tidal zones along the coasts of Britain and Ireland. Sub-tidal reefs are exceptionally rare in the region, being typically found in the Mediterranean. The Wicklow Reef is the first and only known example of a sub-tidal Sabellaria alveolata reef off the coast of Britain and Ireland.

The reef is home to a number of species of crab, starfish, sea-squirts, brittlestars, as well as molluscs and bryozoans. Several species of worm such as Phaeostachys spinifera, Eulalia ornata and Unciola crenatipalma are very uncommon in Irish waters, and the Wicklow Reef is therefore considered a priority habitat. The reef is an EU-designated Special Area of Conservation.

== Reef species ==
Scientific Name	Image
Sabellaria alveolata	
Spirobranchus triqueter	
Urticina felina	
Tubularia indivisa	
Ophiothrix fragilis	
Sertularia argentea	
Clavelina lepadiformis	
Hydrallmania falcata	

== See also ==
- List of Special Areas of Conservation in the Republic of Ireland
