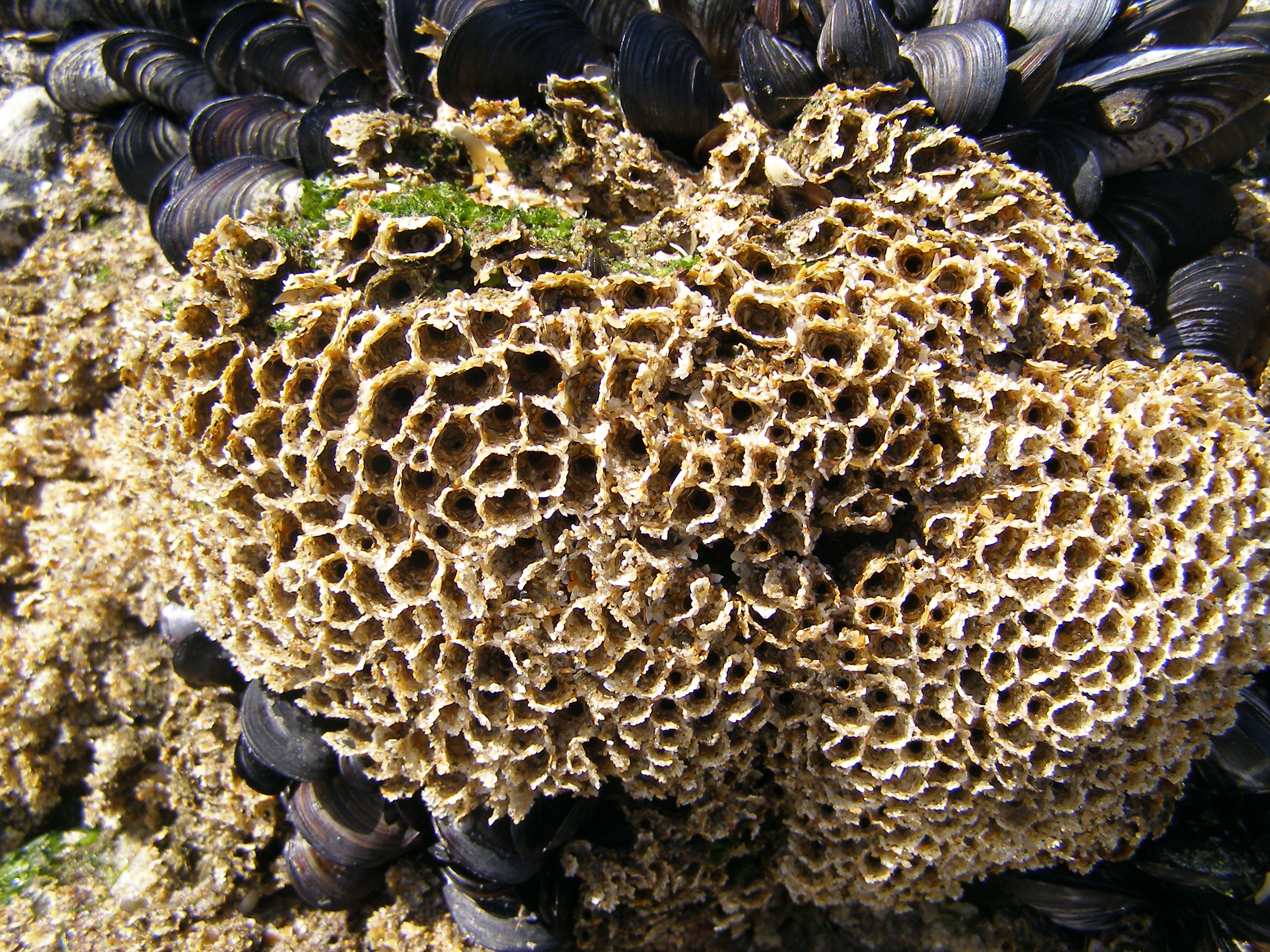
- Tubes of Sabellaria alveolata

Scientific classification
- Kingdom: Animalia
- Phylum: Annelida
- Clade: Pleistoannelida
- Clade: Sedentaria
- Family: Sabellariidae
- Genus: Sabellaria; Savigny, 1853

Species
- See text.

= Sabellaria =

Genus of annelid worms

Sabellaria is a genus of marine polychaete worms in the family Sabellariidae. The type species is Sabellaria alveolata (Linnaeus, 1767). These worms are sedentary and build tubes in which to live from sand and shell fragments. Some species are called honeycomb worms and when they occur in great numbers they can form reefs on rocks and other hard substrates. They are filter feeders, extending a plume-like fan of radioles from the end of the tube in order to catch plankton and detritus floating past. They have a distinctive operculum which is used to block the opening of the tube when the radioles are retracted.

== Species ==
The following species are listed by the World Register of Marine Species:

- Sabellaria alcocki Gravier, 1906
- Sabellaria alveolata (Linnaeus, 1767)
- Sabellaria bella (Grube, 1870)
- Sabellaria bellani Kirtley, 1994
- Sabellaria bellis Hansen, 1882
- Sabellaria chandraae Silva, 1961
- Sabellaria clava Kirtley, 1994
- Sabellaria eupomatoides Augener, 1918
- Sabellaria fissidens (Grube, 1870)
- Sabellaria floridensis Hartman, 1944
- Sabellaria fosterae Kirtley, 1994
- Sabellaria fucicola Augener, 1918
- Sabellaria gilchristi McIntosh, 1924
- Sabellaria gracilis Hartman, 1944
- Sabellaria grueti Kirtley, 1994
- Sabellaria guinensis Augener, 1918
- Sabellaria intoshi Fauvel, 1914
- Sabellaria ishikawai Okuda, 1938
- Sabellaria isumiensis Nishi et al. 2010
- Sabellaria javanica Augener, 1934
- Sabellaria longispina Grube, 1848
- Sabellaria lotensis Kirtley, 1994
- Sabellaria magnifica Grube, 1848
- Sabellaria marskaae Kirtley, 1994
- Sabellaria minuta Carrasco & Bustos, 1981
- Sabellaria miryaensis Parab & Gaikwad, 1990
- Sabellaria moorei Monro, 1933
- Sabellaria nanella Chamberlin, 1919
- Sabellaria orensanzi Kirtley, 1994
- Sabellaria pectinata Fauvel, 1932
- Sabellaria ranjhi Hasan, 1960
- Sabellaria spinularia
- Sabellaria spinulosa Leuckart, 1849
- Sabellaria taurica (Rathke, 1837)
- Sabellaria tottoriensis Nishi, Kato & Hayahi, 2004
- Sabellaria vulgaris Verrill, 1873
- Sabellaria wilsoni Lana & Gruet, 1989
