= Pseudoalteromonas spongiae =

Scientific classification
- Domain: Bacteria
- Kingdom: Pseudomonadati
- Phylum: Pseudomonadota
- Class: Gammaproteobacteria
- Order: Alteromonadales
- Family: Pseudoalteromonadaceae
- Genus: Pseudoalteromonas
- Species: P. spongiae

Binomial name
- Pseudoalteromonas spongiae Lau et al., 2005

Species of bacterium

Pseudoalteromonas spongiae is a marine bacterium isolated from the sponge Mycale adhaerens in Hong Kong. Cells are gram-negative and rod shaped.
