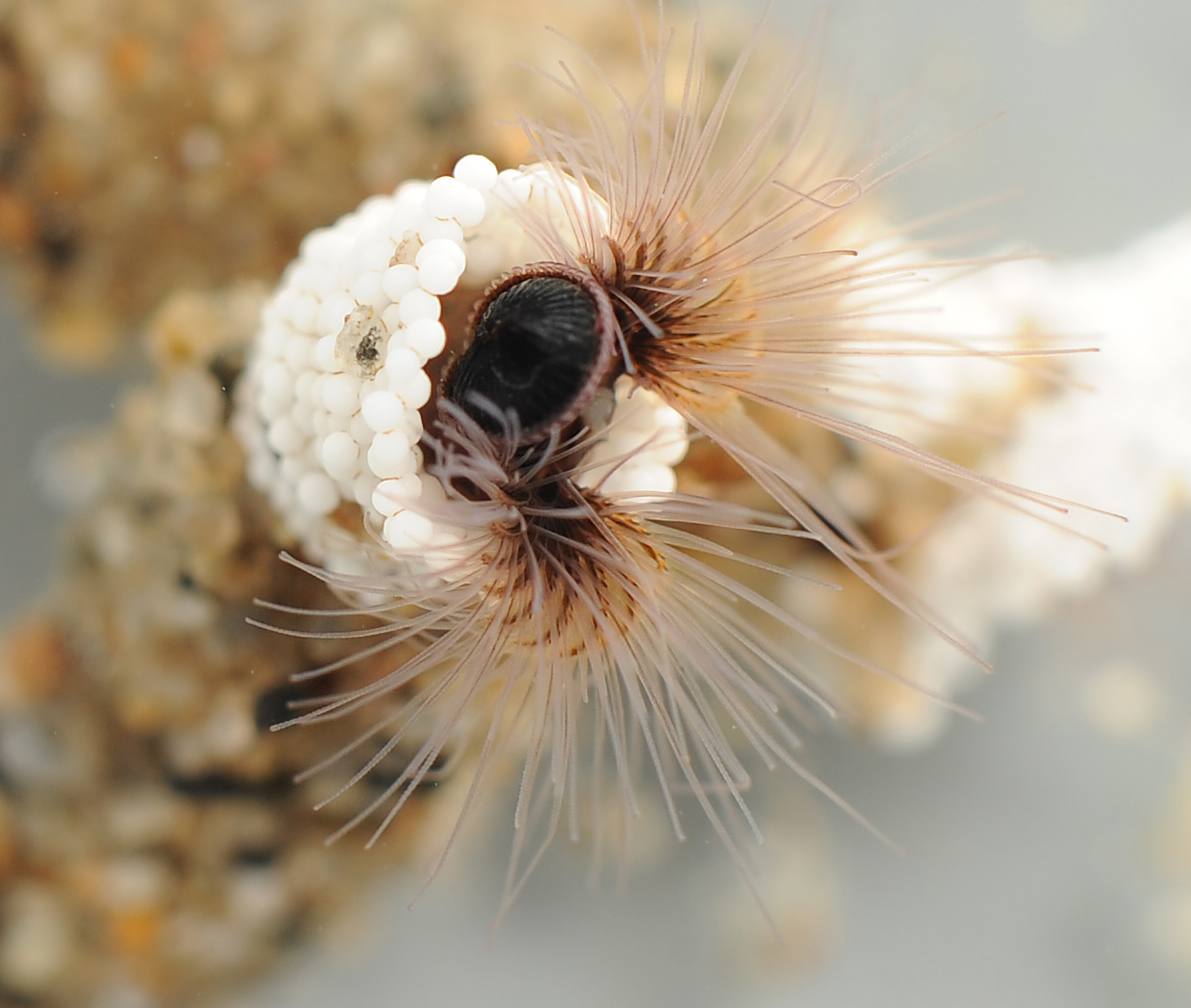
- Sandcastle worm in captivity, building its tube out of sand and white ceramic beads

Scientific classification
- Kingdom: Animalia
- Phylum: Annelida
- Clade: Pleistoannelida
- Clade: Sedentaria
- Family: Sabellariidae
- Genus: Phragmatopoma
- Species: P. californica

Binomial name
- Phragmatopoma californica Kinberg, 1867

= Phragmatopoma californica =

Species of annelid worm

Phragmatopoma californica, commonly known as the sandcastle worm, the honeycomb worm or the honeycomb tube worm, is a reef-forming marine polychaete worm belonging to the family Sabellarididae. It is dark brown in color with a crown of lavender tentacles and has a length of up to about 7.5 centimeters (3.0 in). The worm inhabits the Californian coast, from Sonoma County to northern Baja California.

Sandcastle worms live in colonies, building tube reefs somewhat similar to sandcastles (hence the name), which are often seen on rocky beaches at medium and low tide. The sandcastles, which have a honeycomb-like outward appearance, can cover an area of up to 2 meters (6.6 ft) on a side. They may share areas with mussel beds and are found in any place that provides some shelter, such as rock faces, overhanging ledges and concave shorelines.

The worms remain in their tubes and are almost never seen. At low tide, when above the water, they close the entrance to their tubes with a shield-like operculum made of dark setae. When submerged, they extend their tentacles out of the tube to catch food particles and sand grains. The grains are sorted, with the best ones used to keep the tube in repair, and the rest ejected. The colonies are formed by the gregarious settlement of larvae, which require contact with an existing colony to metamorphose into adult worms. Gregarious settlement of this species has been linked to specific free fatty acids associated with the tubes of adult worms. On rocky beaches, settlement is dependent on larval behavior in the water column and perception of chemical cues when the larvae contact the tubes.

Sandcastle worms should not be confused with the similar, but more northern Sabellaria cementarium which are found from Alaska to southern California and have an amber-colored operculum. Unlike P. californica, S. cementarium rarely forms colonies, does not settle gregariously, and its larvae do not respond to free fatty acids.

== Underwater glue ==
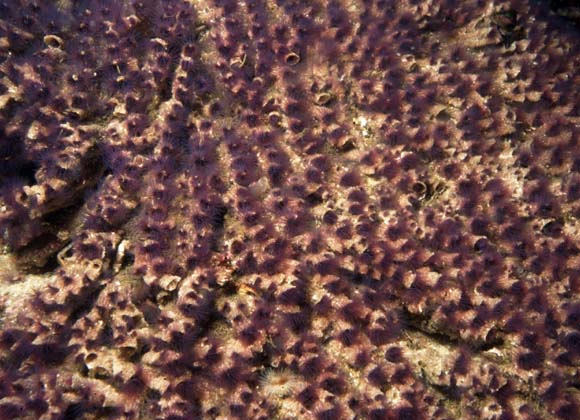
Colony underwater

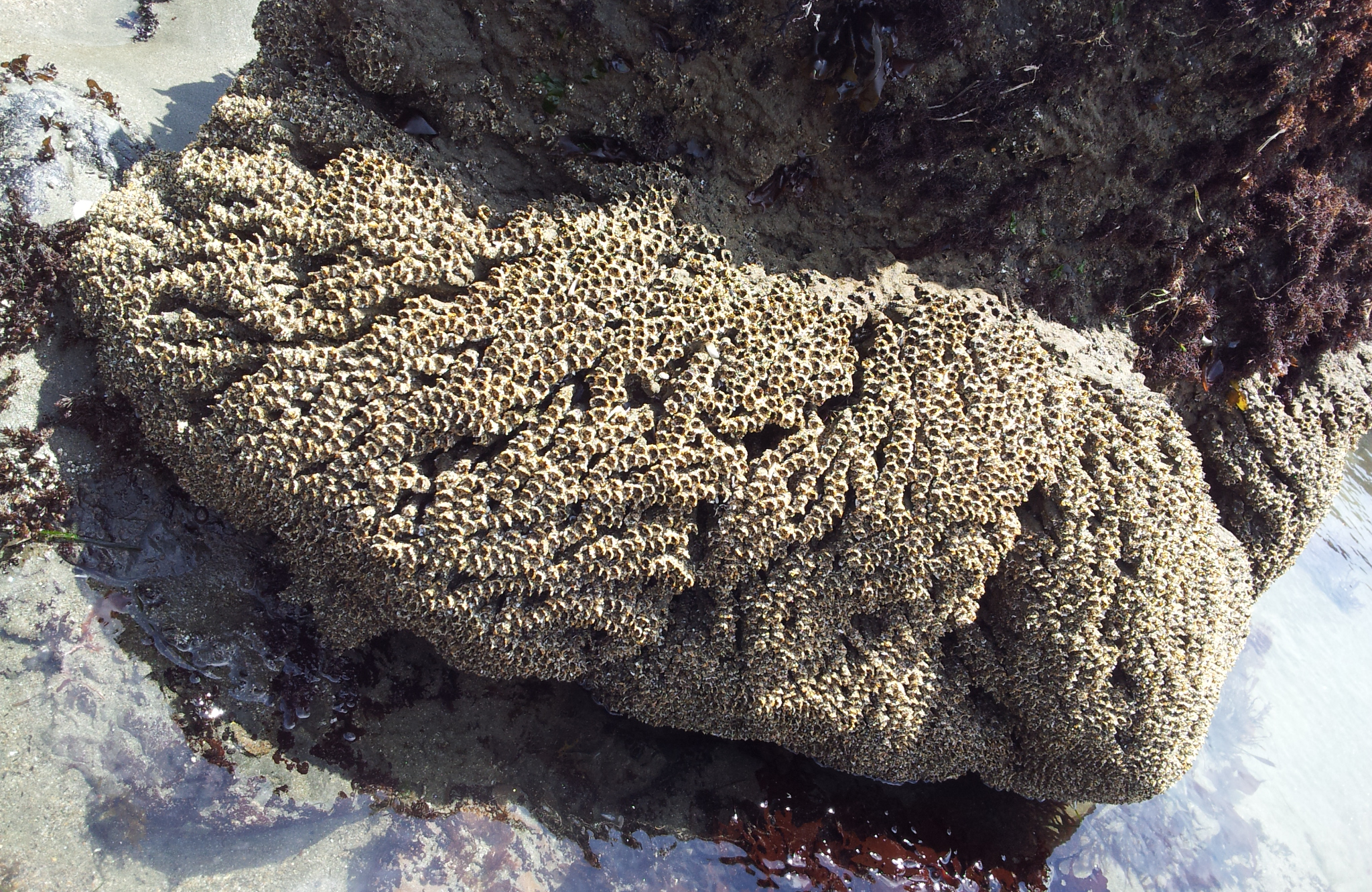
Colony exposed by low tide

In 2004, researchers from the University of California, Santa Barbara (UCSB) discovered that the glue used by the Phragmatopoma worm to build its protecting tube was made of specific proteins with opposite charges. Those proteins are called polyphenolic proteins that are used as bioadhesives. They succeeded in obtaining the sequence of these adhesive proteins. Inspired by these results University of Utah researchers reported in 2009 that they succeeded in duplicating the glue that the worms secrete and use to stick sand grains together underwater. The typical amount of glue that the worm produces at once is approximately 100 picoliters, requiring 50 million to fill a teaspoon.

They believe the glue to have applications as a biocompatible medical adhesive, for instance to repair shattered bones. If found to be practicable, the synthetic glue, which is based on complex coacervates, could be used to fix small bone fragments, instead of metal stabilizer devices such as pins and screws, which are challenging to use. Other potential medical applications include sealing skin cuts, repair of cranio-facial bones, and corneal incisions.

Obstacles include ensuring that the bond is to the substrate rather than the surface layer of the water. Another is that in order to cure, glues need to dry out. Most either do not cure underwater or set too quickly.

The proteins that are the basis of its adhesive contain side chains of phosphate and amine groups, which are well-known adhesion promoters which probably helps wet the surface. The glue has two parts, with different proteins and side groups in each. The two are made separately in a gland, like an epoxy, and mix as they are secreted. The glue sets in about 30 seconds, probably triggered by the large difference in acidity between the acidic glue and seawater. Curing takes about six hours, as the proteins cross-link, reaching the consistency of shoe leather.

Existing medical superglues are highly immunogenic. Initial experiments with the new synthetic on animals show no immune response. But inside the body, the glue needs to eventually degrade, ideally at roughly the same rate as the bone or tissue regrows. Degradable versions therefore include proteins that are broken down by specialized cells.

Other species that produce underwater glues include certain species of mussels, oysters, barnacles and caddisfly larvae.
