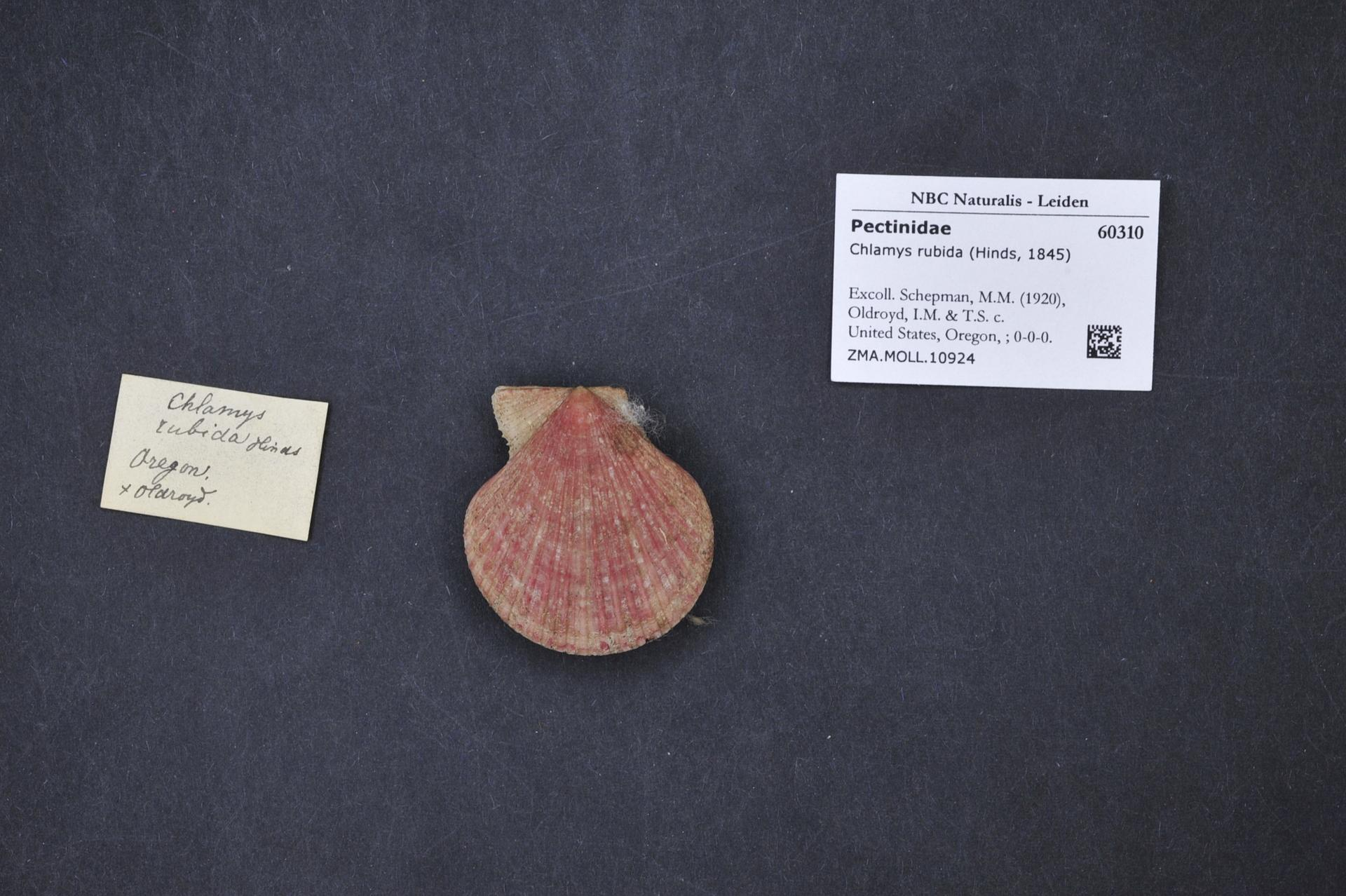
- Chlamys rubida shell

Scientific classification
- Kingdom: Animalia
- Phylum: Mollusca
- Class: Bivalvia
- Order: Pectinida
- Family: Pectinidae
- Genus: Chlamys
- Species: C. rubida

Binomial name
- Chlamys rubida (Hinds, 1845)

Synonyms
- Pecten (Chlamys) jordani Arnold, 1903; Pecten hindsii Carpenter, 1864; Pecten hindsii kincaidi Oldroyd, 1920

= Chlamys rubida =

Species of bivalve

Chlamys rubida (Note: Also known as the Pacific pink scallop, pink scallop, scooter scallop (for its tendency to "scoot" along the sea floor, and the singing scallop (for the noise it sometimes makes while swimming) is a species of bivalve mollusc in the family Pectinidae found on the west coast of North America from the Gulf of Alaska to San Diego, California.

== Description ==
The pink scallop has two convex valves joined by a hinge joint and grows to a diameter of about 6 centimetres (2.4 in). Each valve has an umbo or knoblike protuberance from which 20 to 30 shallow ridges radiate to the margin at the other side of the shell. The left valve is usually uppermost as it lies on the seabed and is some shade of red intermixed with white streaks. The annual growth rings can be seen and there is concentric sculpturing parallel to the margin, often in a different shade of pink. The lower valve is either a paler shade of pink or dull white. There is a large auricle or flap on one side of the umbo. When the animal is feeding, it holds the valves apart and the mantle becomes visible, fringed with short tentacles and with a ring of tiny eyes near the margin of each valve.

The pink scallop can be distinguished from its close relative the spiny scallop (Chlamys hastata) by the valves being rather more rounded and by the lack of spines on the ribs which gives it a smooth texture. The glossy white interior of the shell does not have the purplish markings that are sometimes present in the spiny scallop.

== Distribution ==
The pink scallop is found on the Pacific Coast of North America at depths down to about 300 metres (980 ft). Its range extends from Alaska to San Diego, California but it is more common in the northern half of this range. It is also found in Kamchatka, the Sea of Okhotsk and Japan. It is found on rocks or on sandy or muddy sea beds.

== Ecology ==
The pink scallop usually has a symbiotic relationship with an encrusting sponge, usually the orange Myxilla incrustans, which grows on its left valve. The sponge provides camouflage for the scallop, and may deter predators from attacking it. The sponge also makes it harder for a starfish to pull open the scallop with its tube feet, because it makes manipulating the shell more difficult. The sponge benefits from not being submerged by sediment in turbid conditions. In the laboratory, a study showed that when the sediment in seawater tanks was frequently stirred up, sponges on empty scallop shells all died, whereas those on living shells flourished. When a starfish such as the mottled star (Evasterias troschelii) approaches, the scallop "smells" its presence with chemoreceptors at the tips of its tentacles. It then takes evasive action, repeatedly clapping its valves together and swimming away, margin first. If a starfish succeeds in touching a sponge growing on the shell, it often turns away, apparently repelled by this distasteful coating.
