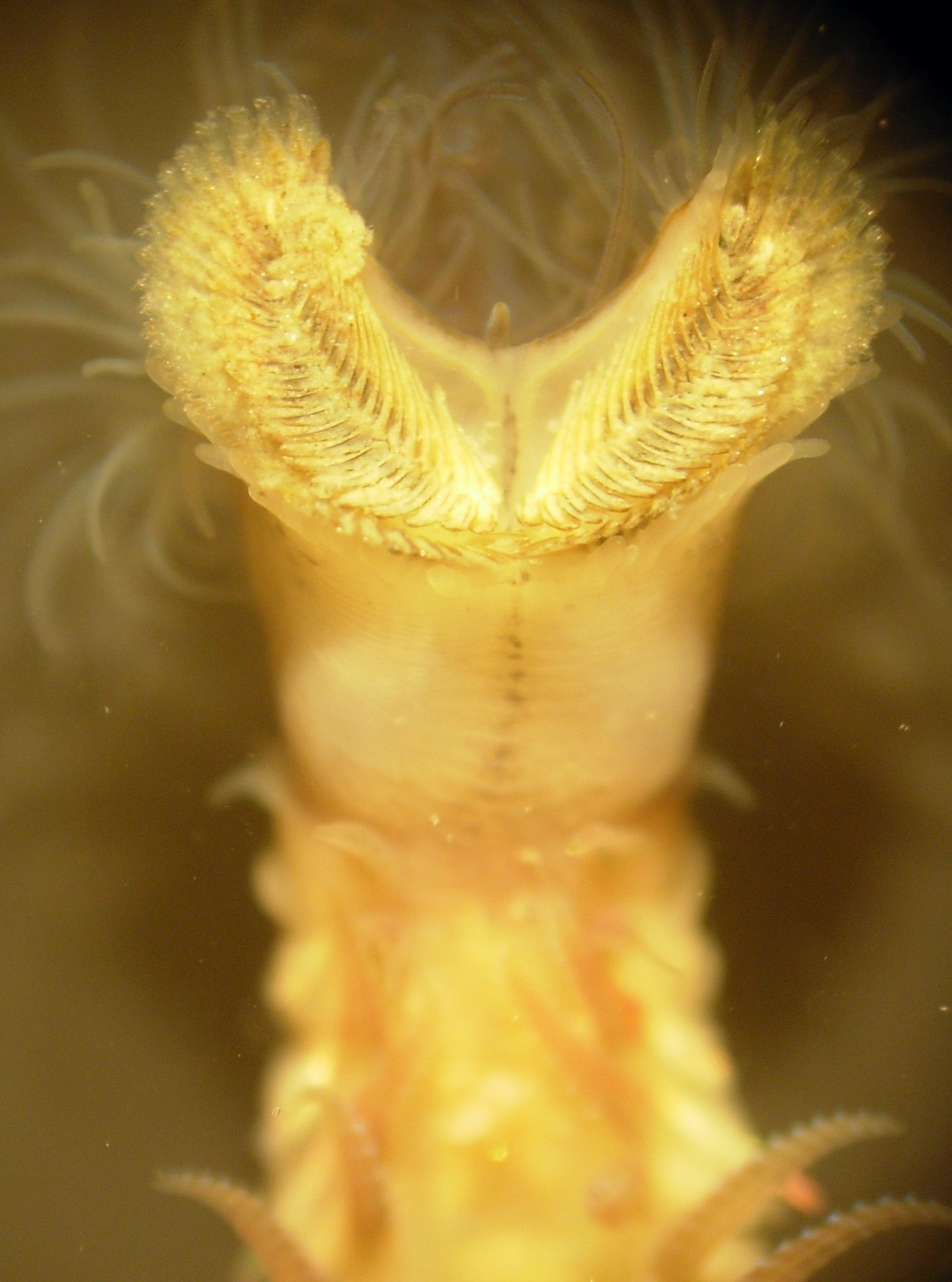

Scientific classification
- Kingdom: Animalia
- Phylum: Annelida
- Clade: Pleistoannelida
- Clade: Sedentaria
- Family: Sabellariidae
- Genus: Sabellaria
- Species: S. alveolata

Binomial name
- Sabellaria alveolata Linnaeus, 1767

= Sabellaria alveolata =

Honeycomb worm

Species of annelid worm

Sabellaria alveolata, (also known as the honeycomb worm), is a reef-forming polychaete. It is distributed around the Mediterranean Sea, and from the north Atlantic Ocean to south Morocco. It is also found in the British Isles at its northern limit in the northeast Atlantic. Its common name is derived from the honeycomb-like pattern it creates when building its tube reefs.

== Description ==
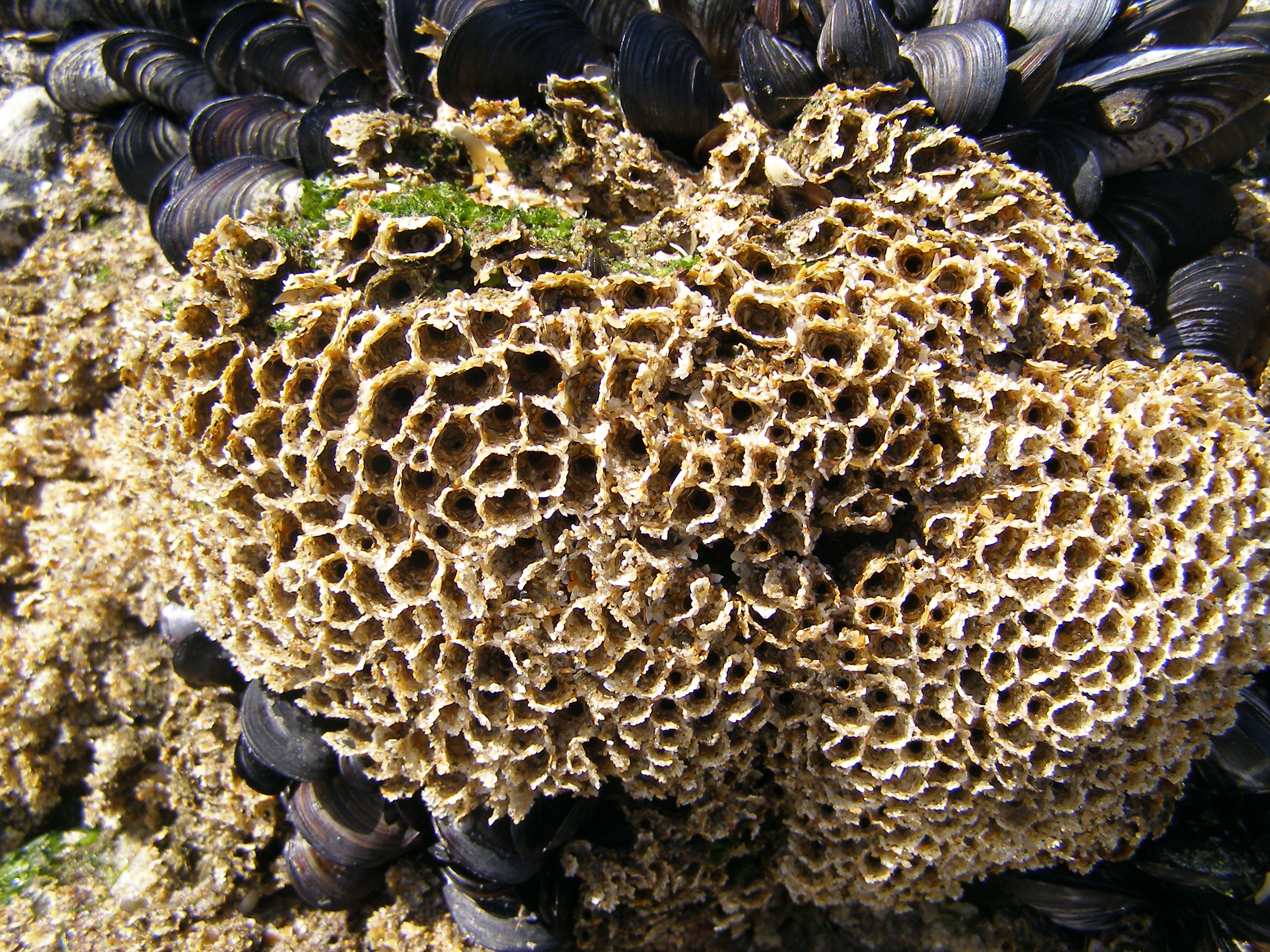
The tubes of Sabellaria alveolata

Sabellaria alveolata is an annelid (ringed worm) that lives in small tubes it constructs from cemented coarse sand and/or shell material, forming reefs. The tubes are arranged in close proximity and have a distinctive honeycomb-like appearance. These reefs range from 30 centimetres (12 in) to 2 metres (6.6 ft) thick and take the form of hummocks, sheets or more massive formations. Adult size ranges from 30 to 40 millimetres (1.2 to 1.6 in). The thorax has three pairs of flattened chaetal sheaths, its chaetes form an operculum which is used to seal the tube opening. Depending on the local substrate, the colour of the tube varies.

== Distribution ==
Sabellaria alveolata is found in the Mediterranean and the north Atlantic from Britain south to Morocco. In Britain and Ireland it is mainly found in inter-tidal zones along southern and western coasts from the Western Isles to Cornwall. The Wicklow Reef in the Irish Sea lies at a depth of 12–30 metres (39–98 ft) and is the only known example of a sub-tidal Sabellaria alveolata reef off the coast of Britain and Ireland.

== Habitat and ecology ==
Sabellaria alveolata occurs on the bottom third or so of the intertidal zone and in the shallow subtidal zone. The worms construct different types of structures depending on the conditions. Where it occurs along rocky shorelines among bladderwrack then the agglomeration of tubes vary from thin encrustations if they are present at low densities to dense hummocks and mounds where there is a high density. The tubes are built from shell fragments or sand and are used to protect the worm from predators and can be repaired if damaged near the entrance. The tube is made up of a number of overlapping layers of material glued together with mucus. There are two sexes and spawning takes place in the spring and again in the autumn. The larvae develop in the water column and can detect the substance the adults use to bind their tubes and follow this to find a location to settle on. They are filter feeders and use cilia covered tentacles to extract food from the water. The reefs that they build encourage biodiversity.

== Conservation ==
Sabellaria alveolata is a UK Biodiversity Action Plan species. Published in 1994, the plan encouraged the mapping and surveying of S. alveolata reefs. It is also included in local Biodiversity Action Plans e.g. Newry, Mourne and Down in Northern Ireland. In 2010 Natural England published a list of habitats of principal importance (priority habitats) which include S. alveolata reefs and provides a legal conservation mandate.
