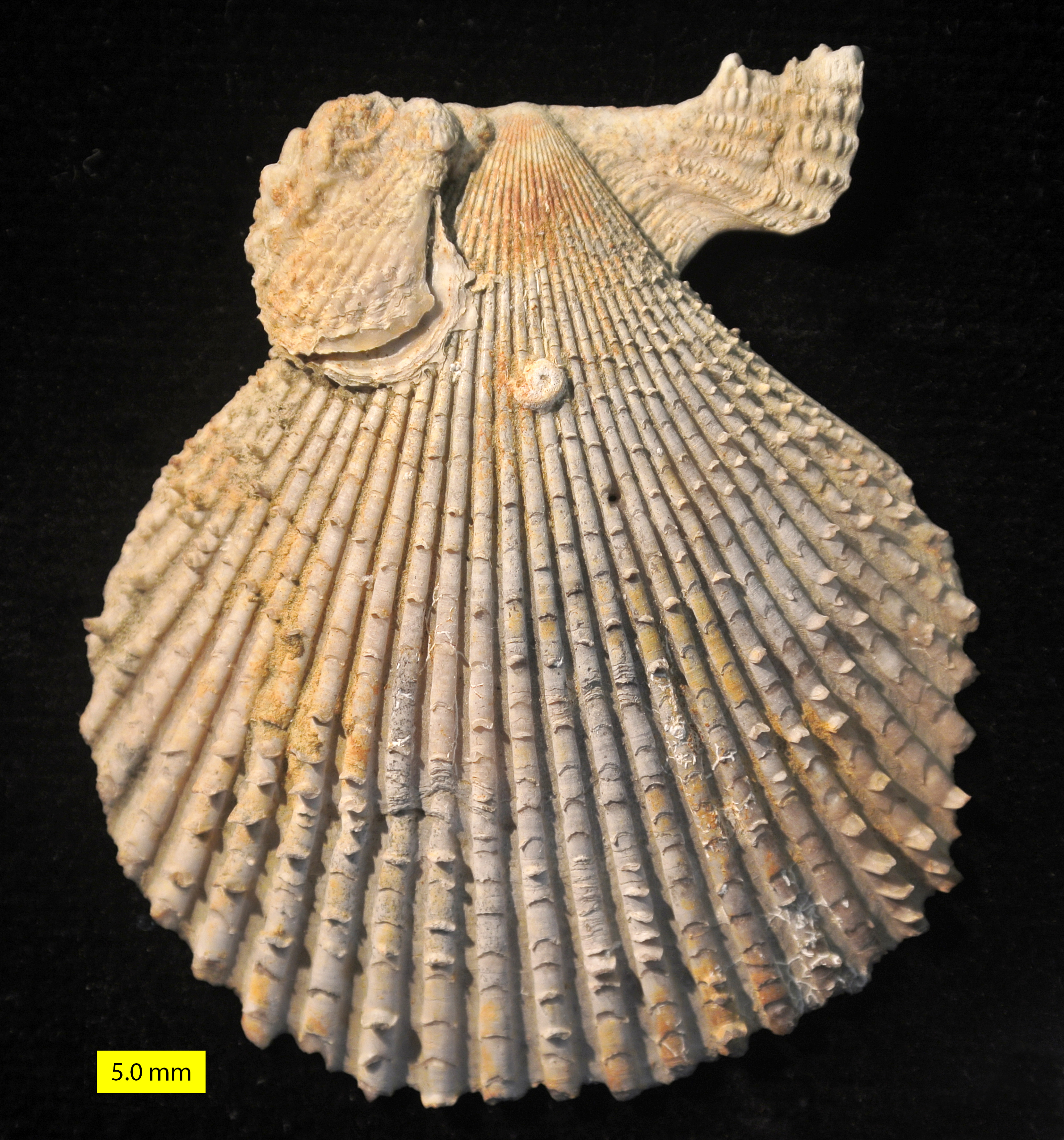
- Fossil Chlamys with encrusters; Nicosia Formation (Pliocene) of Cyprus.

Scientific classification
- Kingdom: Animalia
- Phylum: Mollusca
- Class: Bivalvia
- Order: Pectinida
- Family: Pectinidae
- Genus: Chlamys; Röding, 1798

Type species
- Pecten islandicus Müller, 1776

Species
- 11 extant species (see text)

= Chlamys (bivalve) =

Chlamys Temporal range: Permian–recent, 265–0 Ma

Genus of bivalves

Chlamys is a genus of small scallops, marine bivalve molluscs in the family Pectinidae. The name is taken from the Ancient Greek, χλαμΰς or Chlamys, a cloak worn by soldiers.

Numerous taxa previously included in this genus are now considered synonyms and/or moved to other genera (e.g., Mimachlamys, Talochlamys). Indeed, Chlamys has been used as a "catch-all" genus for many scallops. As currently defined, it is limited to the northern hemisphere.

== Species ==
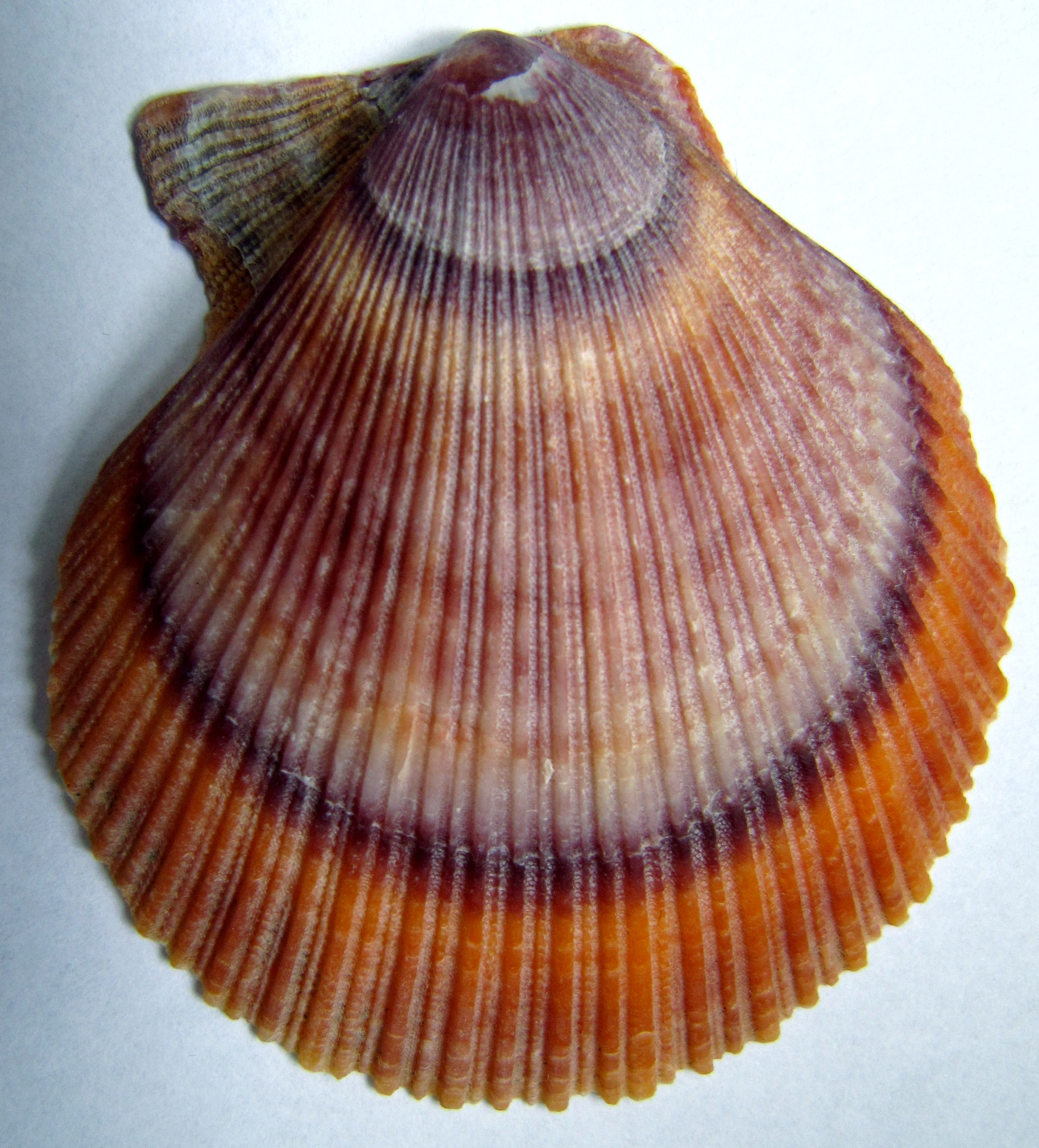
Chlamys islandica, the Iceland scallop

There are 11 recognized extant species:

- Chlamys albida (Arnold, 1906) – white scallop
- Chlamys asiatica Scarlato, 1981
- Chlamys behringiana (Middendorff, 1849) – Bering scallop
- Chlamys biarritzensis † (d'Arciac, 1846) - Spain
- Chlamys chosenica Kuroda, 1932
- Scaeochlamys farreri (K. H. Jones & Preston, 1904) – Farrer's scallop, Chinese scallop.
- Chlamys hastata (G. B. Sowerby II, 1842) – spear scallop, spiny scallop
- Chlamys islandica (O. F. Müller, 1776) – Iceland scallop
- Chlamys lioica (Dall, 1907)
- Chlamys rubida (Hinds, 1845) – reddish scallop
- Chlamys ruschenbergerii (Tryon, 1870)

There are also a large number of species only known from fossil record.
