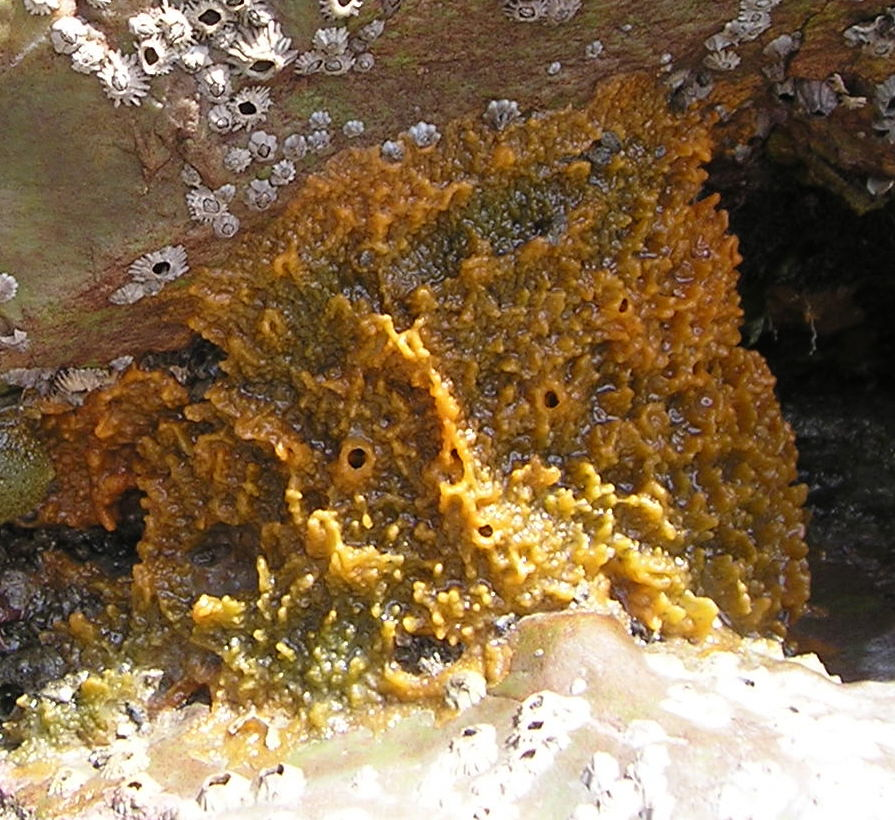

Conservation status
- Secure (NatureServe)

Scientific classification
- Kingdom: Animalia
- Phylum: Porifera
- Class: Demospongiae
- Order: Poecilosclerida
- Family: Myxillidae
- Genus: Myxilla
- Species: M. incrustans

Binomial name
- Myxilla incrustans (Johnston, 1842)

Synonyms
- List: Amphilectus incrustans (Johnston, 1842); Dendoryx incrustans (Johnston, 1842); Halichondria batei Bowerbank, 1866; Halichondria candida Bowerbank, 1866; Halichondria incrustans Johnston, 1842; Halichondria irregularis Bowerbank, 1866; Halichondria robertsoni Bowerbank, 1882; Halichondria saburrata Johnston, 1842; Hastatus robertsoni (Bowerbank, 1882); Isodictya rugosa Bowerbank, 1874; Isodictya tumulosa Bowerbank, 1874; Myxilla gigas Merejkowsky, 1879

= Myxilla incrustans =

Species of sponge

Myxilla incrustans is a species of demosponge. It is an encrusting species and is usually yellow.

== Description ==
M. incrustans is an encrusting sponge occurring in patches up to 20 cm (8 in) across and 5 cm (2 in) high. It is usually some shade of yellow but can range through orange, pink and white. It has a bubbly-looking appearance with internal channels visible through the surface and large, raised oscules. The consistency is fairly soft and elastic but the surface feels crisp because of the vertical spicule bundles supporting it. The skeleton is built out of tornotes, megascleres with spear-shaped ends with tiny spines on them. The microscleres are a mixture of curved, shovel-like chelae and C-shaped sigmas. Several other similar sponges grow in the same habitats and microscopic examination is necessary to identify the species.

== Distribution ==
M. incrustans was described from specimens collected in the Firth of Forth, Scotland, North Sea. It is reported from the Arctic, round Bear Island and the Faroe Islands, on the coasts of Norway and south along the Atlantic coast to the Mediterranean Sea. In these areas, it is usually found between low-water mark and a depth of 400 metres (1,300 ft) on vertical rocks and sites with clean water exposed to strong tidal flows. It also occurs in the north Pacific Ocean from Japan to California, where it is often found growing on the shells of scallops in the genus Chlamys. It is unclear whether the free living Atlantic sponges and the Mutualistic pacific sponges are the same species.

== Biology ==
M. incrustans is viviparous and in the months of August and September, developing embryos are sometimes found inside the tissues. These are spherical and measure about 0.5 mm (0.020 in) across before becoming detached. Initiation of the sexual processes involved in reproduction depends on the water temperature. The male tissue releases sperm into the water column. These may get sucked into another sponge, and then fertilisation takes place. About 7% to 12% of the maternal tissue of the sponge is used up in the reproductive process, and there is some localized destruction of the tissue.
