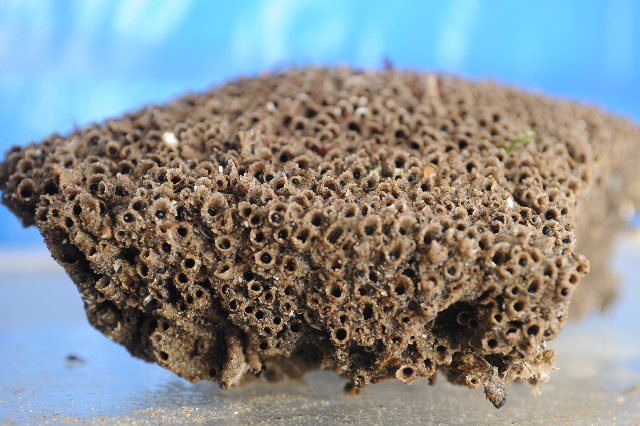
- Phragmatopoma californica

Scientific classification
- Kingdom: Animalia
- Phylum: Annelida
- Clade: Pleistoannelida
- Clade: Sedentaria
- Infraclass: Canalipalpata
- Family: Sabellariidae; Johnston, 1865

Genera
- See text

= Sabellariidae =

Family of annelid worms

Sabellariidae is a family of marine polychaete worms in the suborder Sabellida. The worms live in tubes made of sand and are filter feeders and detritivores.

== Characteristics ==
Members of this family live in tubes made of sand and shell fragments cemented together and attached to rocks. Some species are colonial and the multitude of their tubes may create hummocks and even reefs. The top of the tube can be closed by an operculum formed by several rings of bristles on the head of the worm. The head also bears several fine feeding tentacles and a pair of small palps. The thoracic section of the body has 3 or 4 segments with paddle-like capillary bristles. The abdominal section has many segments each with hooked bristles on raised lobes. There are a pair of gills on each of the thoracic segments and on the front abdominal segments. The rear of the body is bent forward along a groove in the midsection of the body.

== Genera ==
- Alveolaria
- Bathysabellaria
- Branchio
- Centrocorone
- Cryptopomatus
- Gesaia
- Gunnarea
- Hermella
- Idanthyrsus Kinberg, 1876
- Lygdamis Kinberg, 1867
- Mariansabellaria
- Monorchos
- Neosabellaria Kirtley, 1994
- Paraidanthyrsus
- Phalacrostemma Marenzeller, 1895
- Phragmatopoma Mörch, 1863
- Sabellaria Savigny, 1818
- Tetreres
