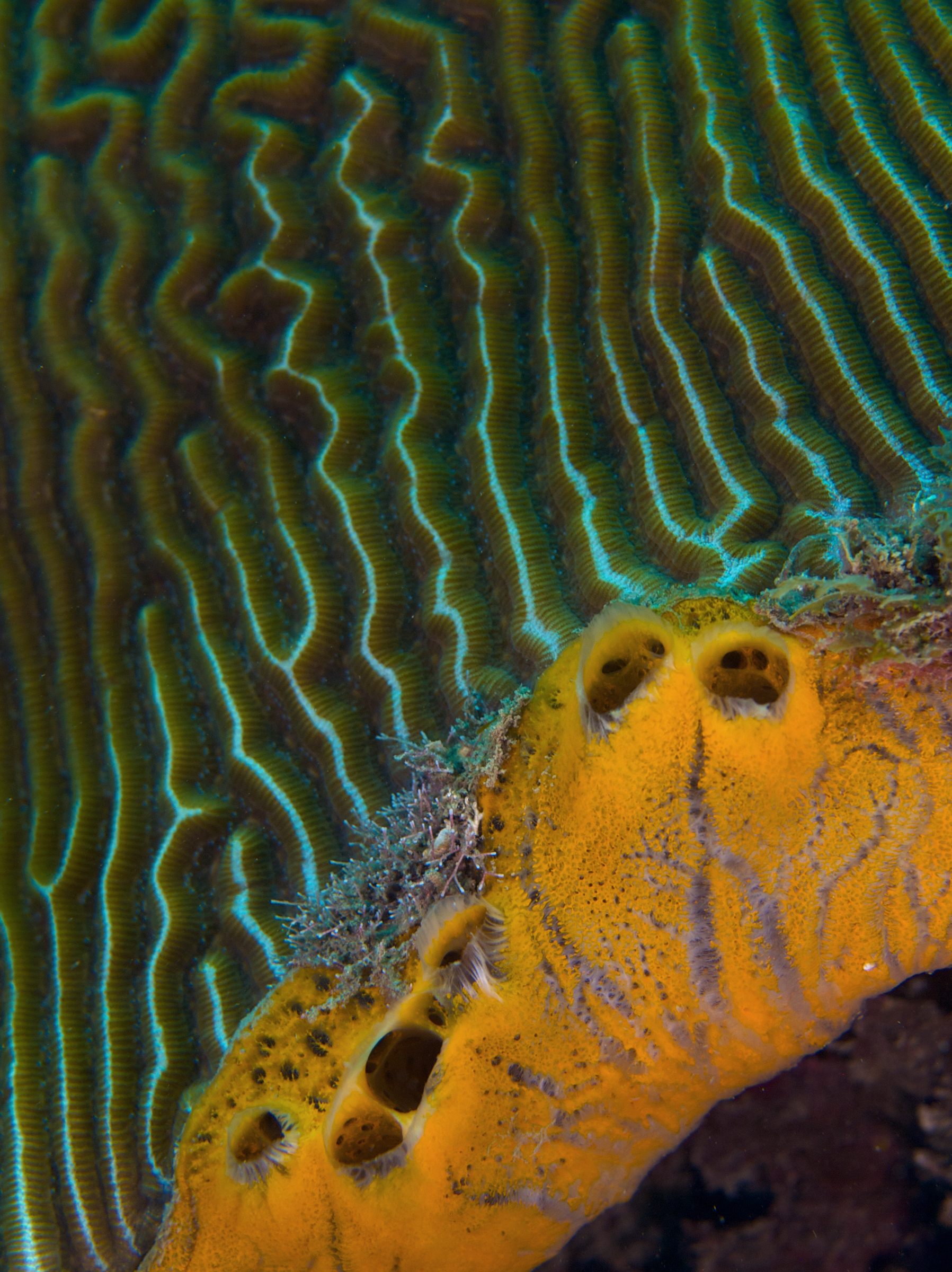
- Orange Icing Sponge (Mycale laevis) growing on a coral reef

Scientific classification
- Kingdom: Animalia
- Phylum: Porifera
- Class: Demospongiae
- Order: Poecilosclerida
- Family: Mycalidae; Lundbeck, 1905

Genera
- See text

Synonyms
- Arenochalininae Lendenfeld, 1888; Esperellinae Ridley & Dendy, 1887; Esperiadae Gray, 1867

= Mycalidae =

Family of sponges

Mycalidae is a family of marine demosponges.

== Genera ==
According to the World Register of Marine Species, there are only two genera in this family. Previously there were about 26, but most of these have been reallocated as sub-genera of the remaining two genera, Mycale and Phlyctaenopora:

- Genus Mycale Gray, 1867
  - subgenus Mycale (Aegogropila) Gray, 1867 - About 37 species.
  - Subgenus Mycale (Anomomycale) Topsent, 1924 - Monotypic.
    - Species Mycale (Anomomycale) titubans (Schmidt, 1870)
  - Subgenus Mycale (Arenochalina) Lendenfeld, 1887 - About 13 species.
  - Subgenus Mycale (Carmia) Gray, 1867 - About 46 species.
  - Subgenus Mycale (Grapelia) Gray, 1867 - About 9 species.
  - Subgenus Mycale (Mycale) Gray, 1867 - About 45 species.
  - Subgenus Mycale (Naviculina) Gray, 1867 - About 11 species.
  - Subgenus Mycale (Oxymycale) Hentschel, 1929 - About 9 species.
  - Subgenus Mycale (Paresperella) Dendy, 1905 - About 18 species.
  - Subgenus Mycale (Rhaphidotheca) Kent, 1870 - About 4 species.
  - Subgenus Mycale (Zygomycale) Topsent, 1931 - About 3 species.
  - Unallocated Mycale: About 33 species.
- Genus Phlyctaenopora Topsent, 1904
  - Subgenus Phlyctaenopora (Barbozia) Dendy, 1922 - 2 species.
    - Species Phlyctaenopora (Barbozia) bocagei Lévi & Lévi, 1983
    - Species Phlyctaenopora (Barbozia) primitiva (Dendy, 1922)
  - Subgenus Phlyctaenopora (Phlyctaenopora) Topsent, 1904 - 2 species.
    - Species Phlyctaenopora (Phlyctaenopora) bitorquis Topsent, 1904
    - Species Phlyctaenopora (Phlyctaenopora) halichondrioides van Soest & Stentoft, 1988
