= CPIE Bocage de l'Avesnois =

Sustainable development association

- Abbreviation: CPIE BA
- Formation: 1991; 35 years ago,
- Type: NGO
- Purpose: Association for the sustainable development of the Arrondissement of Avesnes-sur-Helpe
- Official language: French
- Current President: Nadia DUVAL
- Directeur: Christian COGNEAUX
- Affiliations: Union nationale des CPIE
- Staff: 10
- Volunteers: 40
- Website: CPIE Bocage de l'Avesnois
- Formerly called: Nord Nature Bavaisis

CPIE Bocage de l'Avesnois is a sustainable development association in northern France. Created under the Loi de 1901, it is one of the 80 organizations known as Centre Permanent d'Initiatives pour l'Environnement (CPIE) in France. The association aims to contribute to the sustainable development of the Arrondissement of Avesnes-sur-Helpe; it does this through nature conservation, environmental education and supporting local agents to carry out sustainable development.

== History ==
As a response to a land consolidation, in 1991 thirty people decided to create an association under the Law of 1901 (Nord Nature Bavaisis), initiating environmental education initiatives, guided tours, school events, etc.

In 2004, the association's work was recognized by the state (DIREN having become DREALs ), the Nord department council, and the Nord-Pas-de-Calais Regional council. At that point the association became the CPIE Bocage de l'Avesnois. It is part of a network of nearly 80 CPIE in France.

The association has been partnered since its inception with of the Parc naturel régional de l'Avesnois. Then, it is a member of its decisional committee.

The association has a staff of ten employees.

== Activities ==
According to its community project, the CPIE Bocage de l'Avesnois pursues three strategic objectives:

- to increase knowledge about biodiversity in order to protect it
- to develop eco-citizen behavior and encourage the commitment to action
- to assist local agents

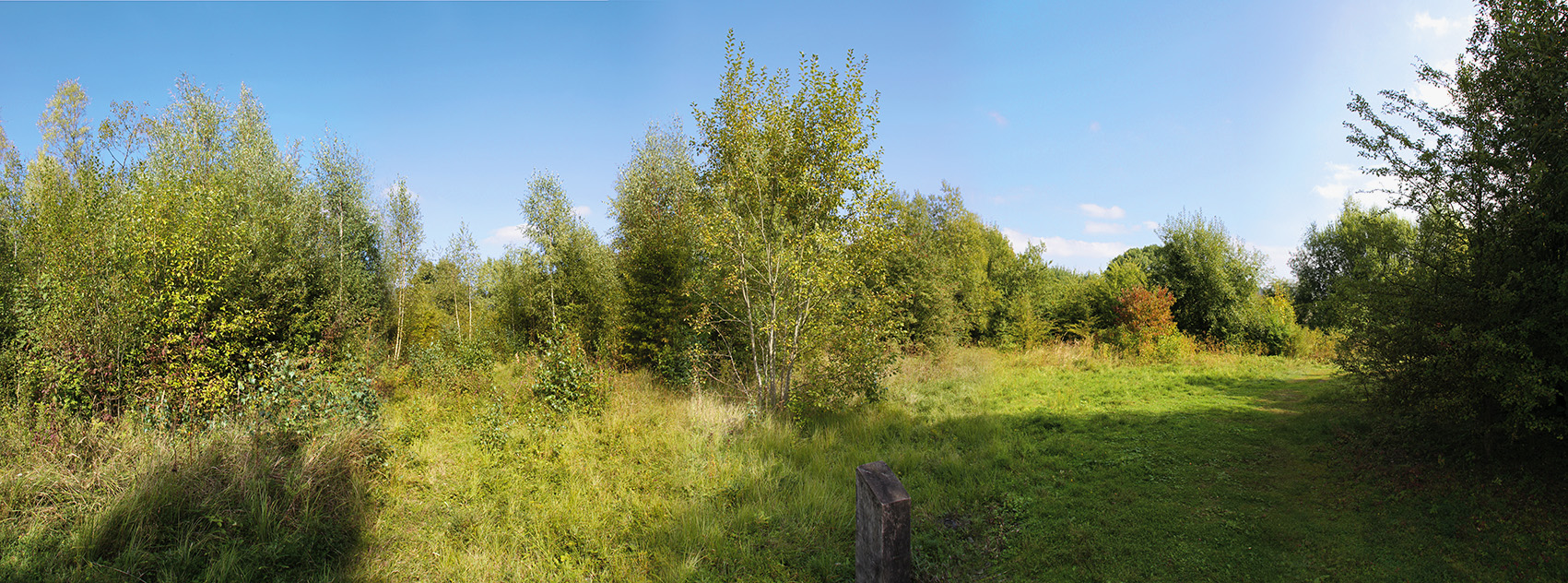
Panoramic view of the Carrière des Nerviens Regional Nature Reserve

=== Nature preservation ===
The association is the owner and operator of the Carrière des Nerviens Regional Nature Reserve, which was classified 25 May 2009 by a decision of the Nord-Pas-de-Calais Regional council. Following the environmental management scheme, floristic monitoring and management are carried out each year. A management committee advises the operator.

The CPIE Bocage de l'Avesnois set up a participatory inventory of arable plants to prepare an atlas.

Since 2007, the CPIE, in partnership with the Conservatoire botanique national de Bailleul and the laboratory of plant biology of Lille University of Science and Technology, monitors two high-environmental-value plants, the wild daffodil and the Belgian gagea. The purpose is to improve knowledge of their ecology and to protect them.

The CPIE Bocage de l'Avesnois also studies the garden dormouse, in partnership with Groupe Ornithologique et Naturaliste Nord-Pas-de-Calais, and the greater dodder plant, which is exceptionally rare at the regional level.

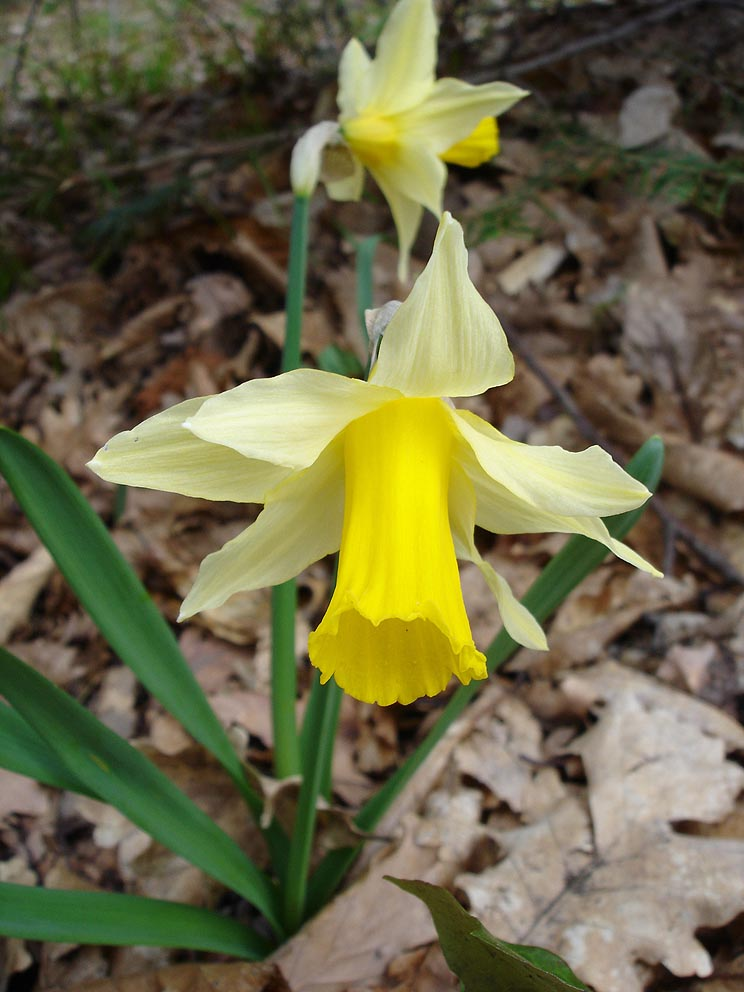
The wild daffodil

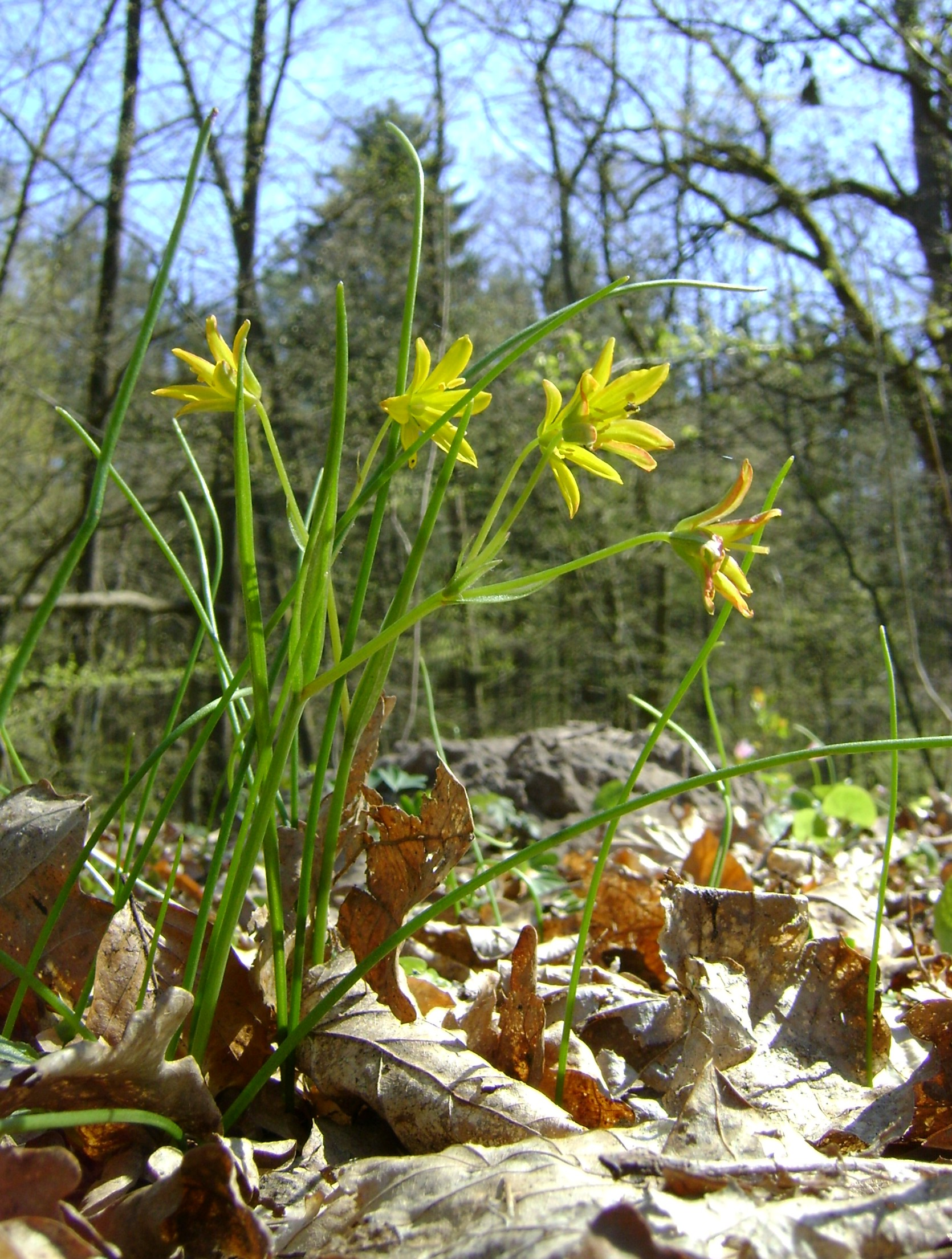
The Belgian gagea

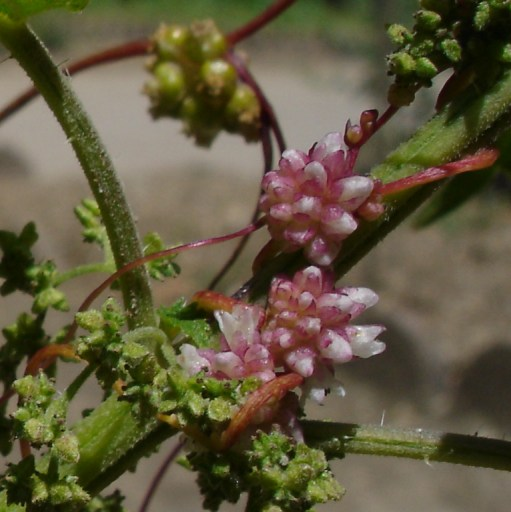
The greater dodder

An Interreg micro-project, validated in February 2012, is based on methodological exchanges on environmental resources management with two Belgian associations Réserves naturelles et ornithologiques de Belgique and Natagora.

=== Environmental education ===
The CPIE Bocage de l'Avesnois is actively involved in the education and training of the general public including children, in its activities. It offers people the opportunity to train to become responsible citizens committed to the environment around them, and to train themselves to participate in the dissemination of similar information.

The association conducts outdoor classes and activities for children during holidays.

For the general public, the association sets up various different kinds of training, guided excursions, including participatory workshops. It also creates interpretive tours.

The association has a collection of documents on nature, environment and the cultural heritage of the area.

The CPIE Bocage de l'Avesnois created a free online game Aventures au fil de l'eau so that children can do speed tests, puzzle games, and carry out experiments to understand the functioning of the river, and discover its wildlife, its flora, its ecology, the threats to the river and the possible remediations of these threats.

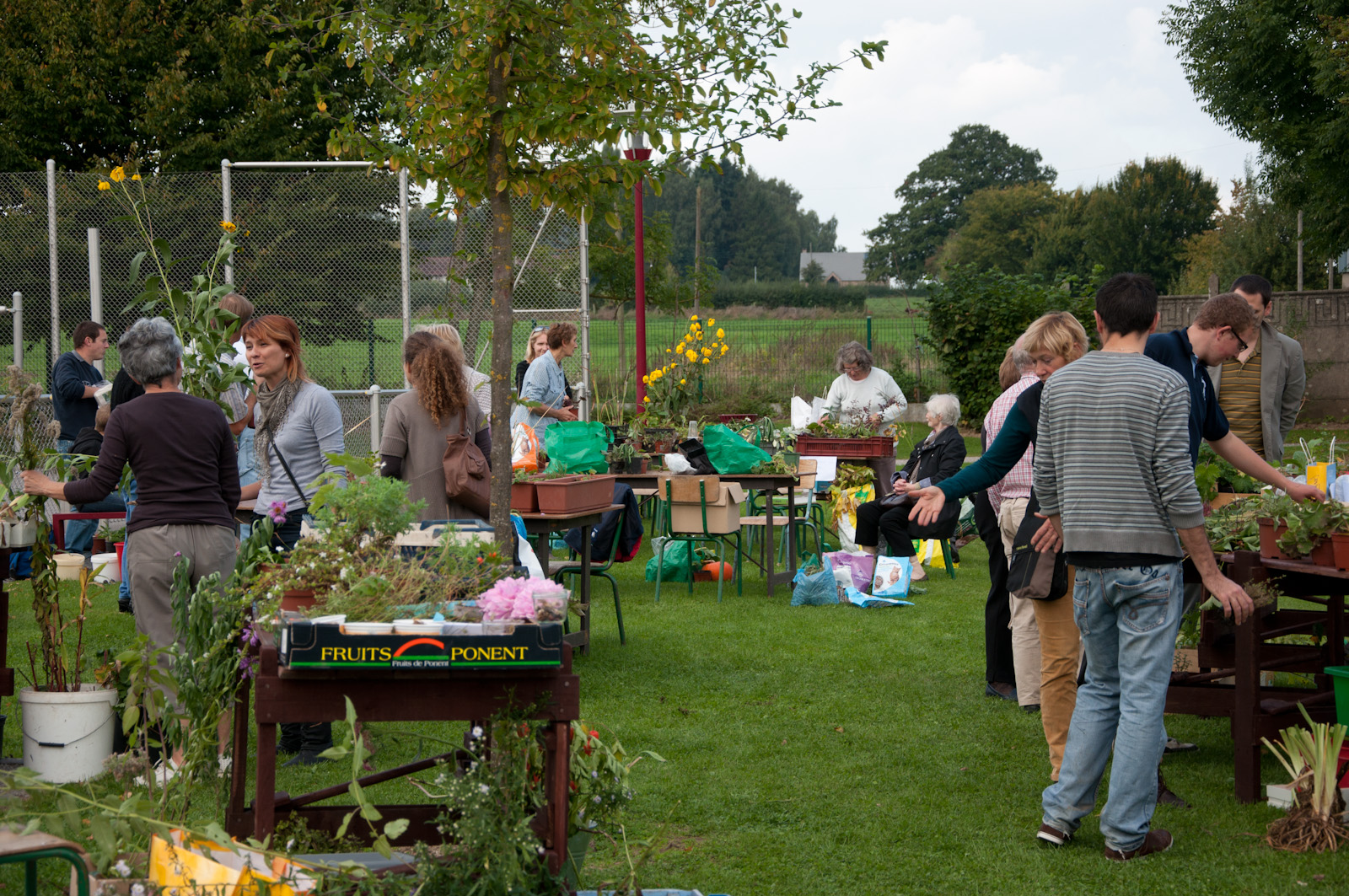
Plant barter organized by the association at Taisnières-sur-Hon.

The CPIE Bocage de l'Avesnois leads a regional campaign called "What nature at home?" advising the public how to welcome nature into their home and garden environment. For this purpose, it has created the website "The natural garden". The association is developing a wikibook called "Natural garden" and twice a year it organizes a plant barter.

It is one of the participants in the "A dragon in my garden" program, which is conducted in partnership with the French National Museum of Natural History.

The association is a partner in the Interreg micro-project START, part of the Savoirs Traditionnels À Redécouvrir en Thiérache, along with the Aquascope de Virelles and the CPIE des Pays de l'Aisne.

Since 2011, a barrier to protect amphibians has been implemented in Bersillies by volunteers.

The CPIE Bocage de l'Avesnois also educates the general public and artisans about how to carry out eco-renovation.

=== Assisting local agents ===
The association also supports local municipalities, municipal associations, and other enterprises. so that their actions are consistent with sustainable development principles, specifically Agenda 21 on environmental management.

Since 2011, CPIE Bocage de l'Avesnois accompanies municipalities or educational teams in achieving their communal or school risk management. It also educates children about risks to the environment.
