= Sir Edward Gage, 1st Baronet =

English baronet

Sir Edward Gage, 1st Baronet (c.1626 – January 1707) was an English baronet.

== Biography ==
Gage was born at Firle, East Sussex, the third son of Sir John Gage, 1st Baronet and Penelope Darcy. He was the grandson of Thomas Darcy, 1st Earl Rivers. From his mother, he inherited Hengrave Hall in Suffolk. He was a supporter of Charles I during the English Civil War. Following the Restoration he was created a baronet, of Hengrave in the County of Suffolk in the Baronetage of England, on 15 July 1662.

Gage was married five times. His first marriage was to Mary, daughter of Sir William Hervey of Ickworth, Suffolk and his first wife Susan Jermyn, by whom he had one son, Sir William, his successor, and two daughters. Hervey later married Gage's twice-widowed mother Penelope Darcy, a noted recusant. He married secondly Frances, a daughter of Walter Aston, 2nd Lord Aston of Forfar and Gertrude Sadler. Sir Edward married, thirdly, Anne Watkins, by whom he had one son, and fourthly Lady Frances Feilding, daughter of George Feilding, 1st Earl of Desmond and Bridget Stanhope. His final marriage was to his fourth wife's relation, Bridget Feilding.

Baronetage of England
New creation	Baronet (of Hengrave); 1662–1707	Succeeded by Sir William Gage, 2nd Baronet
