= Mary Darcy =

Wife of Thomas Darcy, 3rd Baron Darcy of Chiche

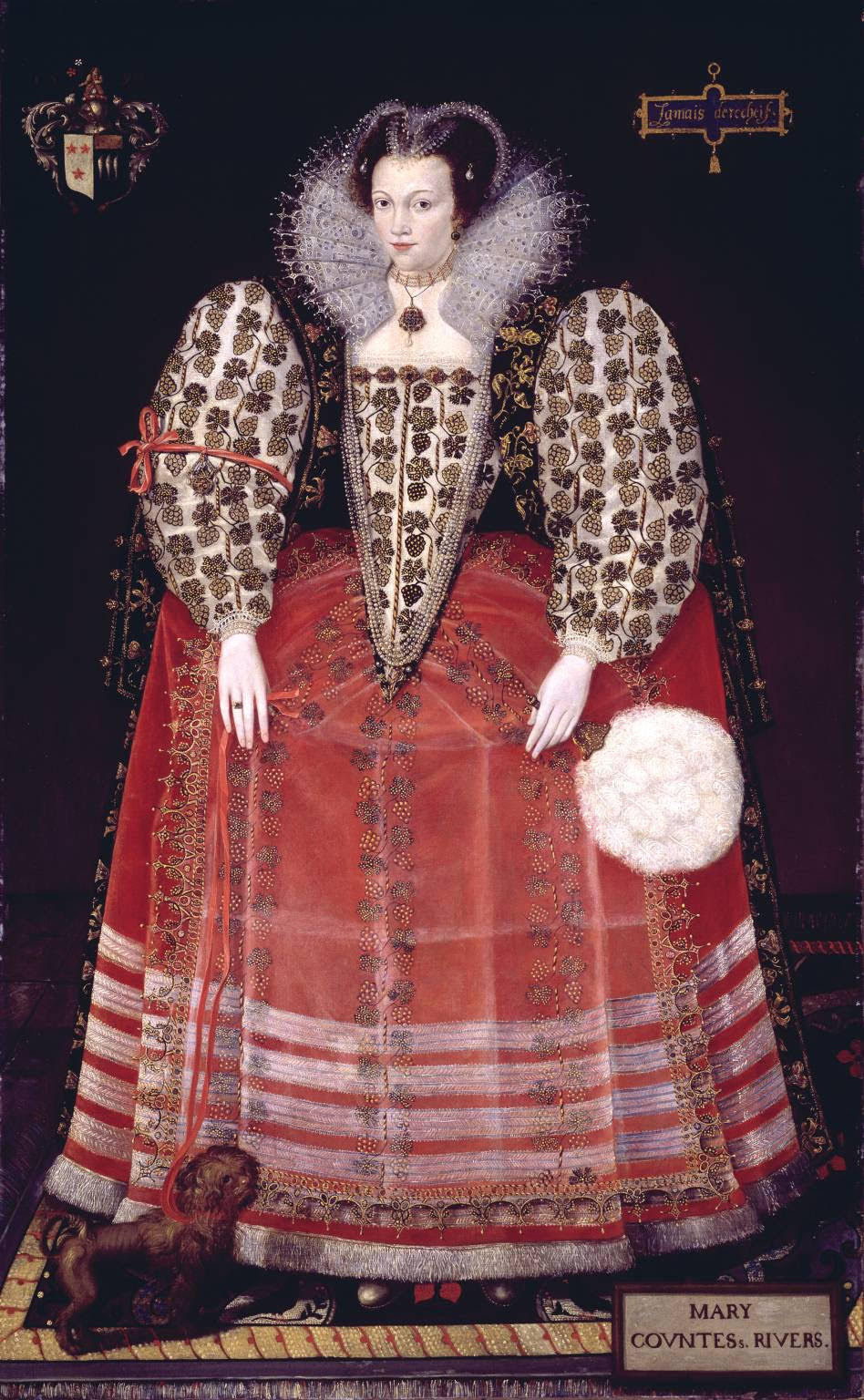
- "Mary Kytson later Lady Rivers"
- Born: Mary Kitson; 1565
- Died: 1644 (aged 78–79)
- Known for: her difficult marriage
- Spouse(s): Thomas Darcy, 1st Earl Rivers
- Children: 5
- Parent(s): Elizabeth and Sir Thomas Kitson

Mary Darcy, Lady Darcy of Chiche born Mary Kitson (1565 – 1644) was the sole heir of Hengrave Hall, near Bury St. Edmunds in Suffolk, England. She became the wife of Thomas Darcy, 3rd Baron Darcy of Chiche. They had five children but his suspicions of adultery led to a separation. Her husband would be the first Earl Rivers.

== Life ==
Mary was the only surviving child of Lady Elizabeth and Sir Thomas Kitson of Hengrave Hall. She was also their heir. Her mother had died in childbirth. She inherited her mother's collection of music and her possessions including Hengrave Hall.

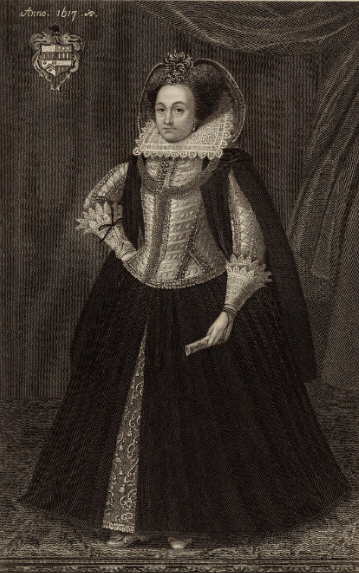
Mary Darcy in 1617 holding a paper

She married Thomas Darcy, third Baron Darcy of Chiche in 1583. Both of the couple had been raised Catholic. Her portrait, now in Tate Britain and previously part of Drue Heinz's collection, shows her in pearls, diamonds and rubies which she received for her marriage. The painting carries the message in French of "never act in haste".

She was a popular figure at the court of Elizabeth I, having beauty and wit. Her husband's task was to inspect the defences on the east coast of England, so he was frequently away. This was a source of his suspicion of her. Her husband felt that she was at least flirting with others, even if not actually committing adultery. She had been quoted making uncomplimentary remarks about him by jealous court rivals and this and her husband's suspicions led to a deed of separation being created in 1594. She had a settlement of £350 per annum. A full-length painting was made of her and in her hand she holds the deed of separation with words "If not, I care not" visible as if to show that she was not heartbroken at the end of her marriage.

Mary, as Countess Rivers, made a will detailing bequests of clothing in 1641, including her taffeta farthingales, "my best cloak and safeguard laid with gold buttons" and an "old safegard laid with gold lace". Her will also lists books including Gerard's Herbal, Treven's Herbal and Wirtzung's Practice of Physicke, equipment for making medicine and her recipe books for physic and preserving.

== Children ==
Mary Darcy had five children, Thomas, Elizabeth, Mary, Susan and Penelope.

Her only son was Thomas Darcy. He was a page to Prince Henry, eldest son of King James I and Anne of Denmark, and performed at the tournament Prince Henry's Barriers in January 1610. Thomas died in 1614.

Her daughter Elizabeth Darcy (1581–1651), married Thomas Savage, 1st Viscount Savage and their children included John Savage, 2nd Earl Rivers. Thomas Savage inherited the family fortune thanks to a special remainder that had been added in 1613 to the Barony of Darcy of Chiche. The special remainder allowed on the failure of his male issue for his riches to go to his son-in-law Sir Thomas Savage, and his heirs.

Her daughter Mary Darcy married Roger Manwood (1591–1623) in 1615, and they had no children

Susan Darcy died unmarried.

Another recusant daughter was Penelope Darcy. She married firstly, 11 June 1610, Sir George Trenchard of Wolveton. He died in 1610 and in 1611 she married Sir John Gage, 1st Baronet. He died in 1633 and she lastly married Sir William Hervey in 1642. She died in 1661. Penelope Darcy had taken the name Gage when she married for the second time and it was she and the Gage children were the heirs to Hengrave Hall.

== Sources ==
- Cokayne, G. E. (1949). White, Geoffrey H. (ed.). The Complete Peerage; or, a History of the House of Lords and all its Members from the Earliest Times. Vol. XI. London: St Catherine Press.
- Moseley, Virginia C.D.; Thrush, Andrew (2010). "Manwood, Roger (1591-1623), of Hackington, Kent". In Thrush, Andrew; Ferris, John P. (eds.). The History of Parliament: the House of Commons 1604-1629. historyofparliamentonline.org.
