= Sir John Gage, 1st Baronet =

English baronet and landowner

Sir John Gage, 1st Baronet (died 3 October 1633) was an English baronet and landowner, and ancestor of the Viscounts Gage.

Gage was the son of Thomas Gage and Elizabeth Guilford. He married Penelope Darcy, a daughter of Thomas Darcy, 1st Earl Rivers and Mary Kitson, on 28 June 1611. They had eight children. His wife had the possession of Hengrave Hall in Suffolk which she left to their third son Edward. This became the seat of his descendants, the Rokewode-Gage baronets. He was made a baronet, of Firle in Sussex in the Baronetage of England, by Charles I on 26 March 1622. He was succeeded in his title by his eldest son, Thomas. His third son, Edward, was also created a baronet. John Gage's sister Elizabeth was the mother of the English nun Dame Gertrude More.

Baronetage of England
New creation	Baronet (of Firley); 1622–1633	Succeeded by Sir Thomas Gage, 2nd Baronet
