= Hengrave Hall =

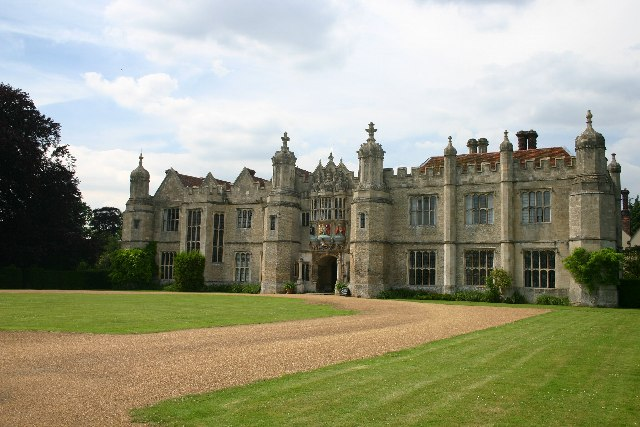
- Hengrave Hall

- Location within Suffolk
- 52°17′05″N 0°40′21″E
- Type: Early prodigy house
- Location: Hengrave, Suffolk

History
- Built: 1525-1538

Site notes
- Architectural style: Tudor
- Owner: David Hugh Harris
- Website: hengravehall.co.uk

Listed Building – Grade I
- Official name: Hengrave Hall
- Designated: 14 July 1955
- Reference no.: 1031423

Listed Building – Grade II
- Official name: Stable Block 20 Yards West of Hengrave Hall
- Designated: 2 September 1983
- Reference no.: 1285416

Hengrave Hall is a Grade I listed Tudor manor house in Hengrave near Bury St. Edmunds in Suffolk, England and was the seat of the Kitson and Gage families 1525–1887. Both families were Roman Catholic recusants.

== Architecture ==
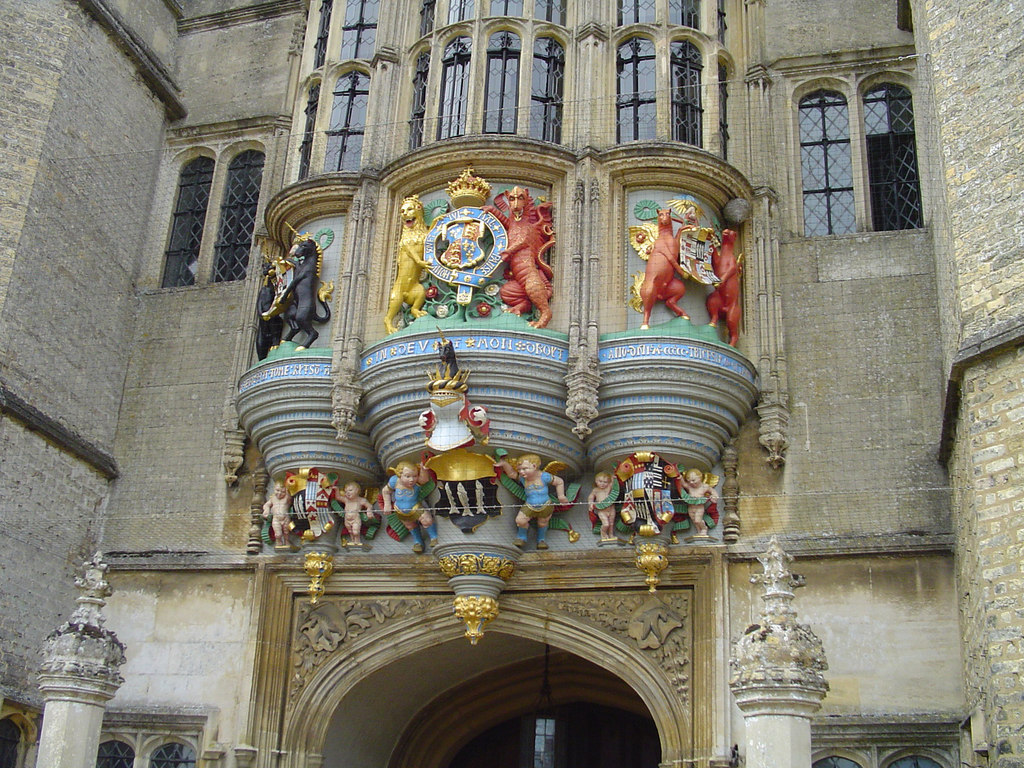
Armorials above front entrance to Hengrave Hall

Work on the house was begun in 1525 by Thomas Kitson, a London merchant and member of the Mercers Company, who completed it in 1538. The house is one of the last examples of a house built around an enclosed courtyard with a great hall. It is constructed from stone taken from Ixworth Priory (dissolved in 1536) and white bricks baked at Woolpit. The house is notable for an ornate oriel window incorporating the royal arms of Henry VIII, the Kitson arms and the arms of the wife and daughters of Sir Thomas Kitson the Younger (Kitson quartered with Paget; Kitson quartered with Cornwallis; Kitson quartered with Darcy; Kitson quartered with Cavendish). The house is embattled, and in the great hall there is an oriel window with fan vaulting by John Wastell, the architect of the chapels at Eton College and King's College, Cambridge.

The chapel contains 21 lights of Flemish glass commissioned by Kitson and installed in 1538, depicting salvation history from the creation of the world to the Last Judgement. This is the only collection of pre-Reformation glass that has remained in situ in a domestic chapel anywhere in England. In the dining room is a Jacobean symbolic painting over the fireplace that defies interpretation, bearing the legend 'obsta principiis, post fumum flamma' ('Resist the first beginnings; after the smoke comes flame'). Also in the Banquet Hall of the house is a window with the Washington coat of arms, quartered with that of Lawrence. One of Sir Thomas Kitson's daughters married into the Washington family.

The house was altered by the Gage family in 1775. The outer court and the east wing were demolished, and the moat was filled in. Alterations on the front of the house were begun but never completed, and Sir John Wood attempted to restore the interior of the house to its original Tudor appearance in 1899. He rebuilt the east wing and re-panelled most of the house in oak. One room, the Oriel Chamber, retains its original seventeenth-century paneling, in which is embedded a portrait of James II painted by William Wissing in 1675. It is thought that some of the original panelling found its way to the Gage's townhouse in Bury St. Edmunds, now the Farmers' Club in Northgate Street. The ornate windows and mouldings at the front of the building feature on the coverpiece on the Suffolk edition of Pevsner's Buildings of England.

== Connections ==
On 5 July 1553 Mary I stopped briefly at Hengrave Hall on her way to Framlingham Castle, the home of Margaret Bourchier, née Donnington, Countess of Bath, widow of Sir Thomas Kitson and Sir Richard Long, and her third husband John Bourchier, Earl of Bath, who were loyal supporters of the Queen. (The Queen's father Henry VIII was godfather to Margaret's son Henry Long from her 2nd marriage. Elizabeth I stayed at Hengrave from 27 to 30 August 1578 and a chamber is named in her honour. The madrigalist John Wilbye was employed by the Kitsons at Hengrave and in London, as was the composer Edward Johnson.

During the Stour Valley anti-popery riots of 1642, Sir William Spring, Penelope Darcy's cousin, was ordered by Parliament to search the house, where it was thought arms for a Catholic insurrection were being stored. The Jesuit William Wright was arrested at Hengrave Hall.

King James II visited Hengrave throughout the 1670s and attended the wedding of William Gage and Charlotte Bond in 1670. The lawyer and antiquarian John Gage was the brother of William Gage, 7th Baronet, and wrote 'The History and Antiquities of Hengrave in Suffolk' in 1822. It is said that the greengage was named after a tree first grown in England at Hengrave, but the tree was actually named after the Viscounts Gage of Firle, Sussex who were cousins of the Hengrave Gages.

== Owners ==
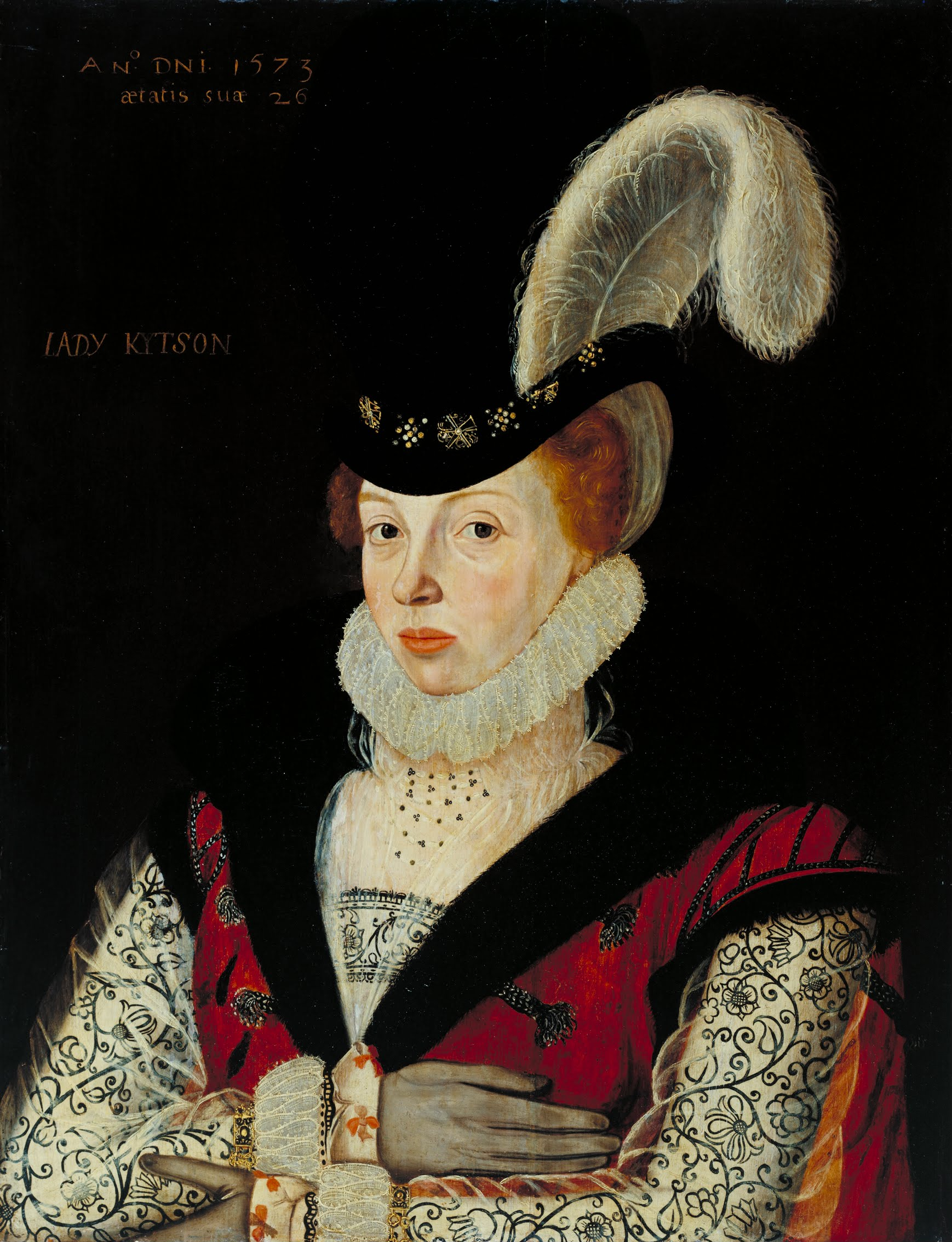
Elizabeth Lady Kitson born Cornwallis ran Hengrave Hall

When Sir Thomas Kitson died on 11 September 1540, he left Hengrave and all his other property to his wife, Dame Margaret (née Donnington). With her he had a posthumous son, afterwards Sir Thomas Kitson, and four daughters, Katherine, Dorothy, Frances and Anne. Just two months after her first husband's death, Dame Margaret married Sir Richard Long (c.1494-1546) of Shengay, Gentleman of the Privy Chamber to Henry VIII. The marriage settlement of Dame Margaret and her third husband, John Bourchier, 2nd Earl of Bath, in 1548, gave her complete control over the extensive personal property she brought into their marriage, including the right to devise it by will should she predecease him.

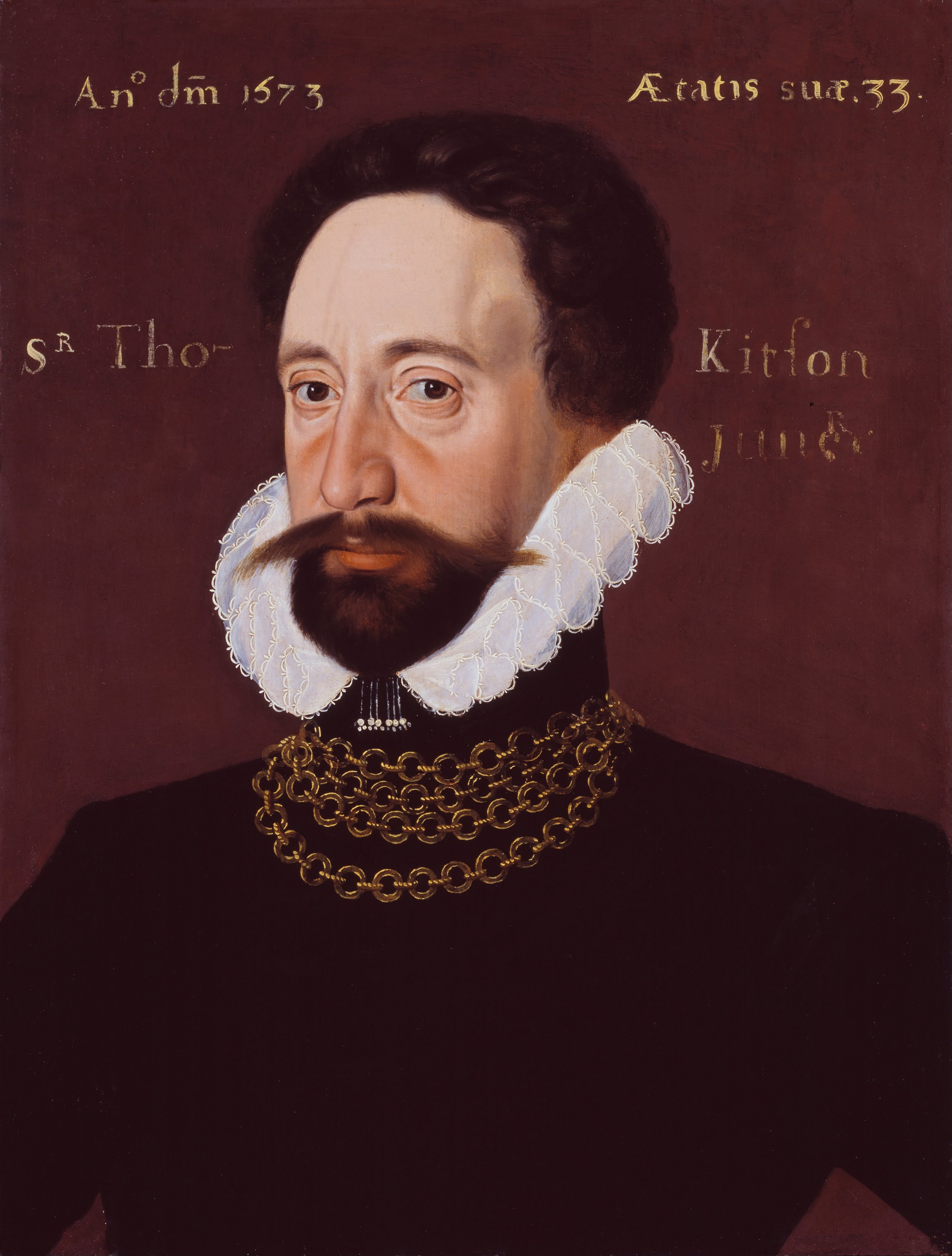
Sir Thomas Kitson (1540–1602)

The posthumous son, Sir Thomas Kitson, married in 1557 but she died in 1558 and he married Elizabeth who arrived with a £600 dowry and the training necessary to be the household manager of Hengrave Hall. Lady Elizabeth and her husband were keen on music and employed resident musicians Edward Johnson and the madrigalist John Wilbye in addition to creating collections of instruments and music.

Hengrave eventually passed down the female Kitson line, and on the death of Elizabeth Kitson in 1628 the music collections and the house was inherited by her daughter Mary Kitson, who had married Thomas Darcy, 1st Earl Rivers. Her granddaughter Penelope Darcy's married Sir John Gage, 1st Baronet, but the house remained her property. She married again in 1642 to Sir William Hervey. The house became home to a wide range of Catholic relatives as there was a lot of anti-Catholic hatred. Riots had attacked properties in the south and the family had been fined £20 a month for not attending church. Penelope passed the house not to her first husband's heir but their third son Sir Edward Gage, 1st Baronet who became a baronet.

The house was used as a refuge by the English Augustinian Canonesses of Bruges from 1794 to 1802, led by their Prioress Mother Mary More. The Canonesses ran a school. In 1887, on the death of Lady Henrietta Gage, the house was bought by John Lysaght, one of the founders of the Australian steel industry. In 1895 it was bought by Sir John Wood, and on his death sold to the Religious of the Assumption, who ran a convent school until 1974.

On 14 September 1974 the Assumptionists founded the ecumenical Hengrave Community of Reconciliation, originally a group of families of different Christian denominations. Later, the Community came to consist of long-term members, who remained in the Community for up to seven years, and short-term members, many of whom came from countries in Central and Eastern Europe for periods ranging from one year to three months. Although strongly inspired by other ecumenical communities like Taizé and the Iona Community, the Hengrave Community had a distinctive character owing to the Sisters' continued presence. The Hengrave Community was dissolved in September 2005, closing its Christian and conference centre at the site, after failing to fund £250,000 for improvements. The current owner of the hall is David Harris who has submitted plans to convert the existing building into private housing. It is currently used for wedding receptions and other functions.

== Sources ==
- Gage, John The History and Antiquities of Hengrave in Suffolk (1822);
- Gage, John The History and Antiquities of Suffolk: Thingoe Hundred (1838);
- Harris, Barbara J. English Aristocratic Women, 1450-1550: Marriage and Family, Property and Careers (2002)
