= Sir William Gage, 2nd Baronet =

English baronet

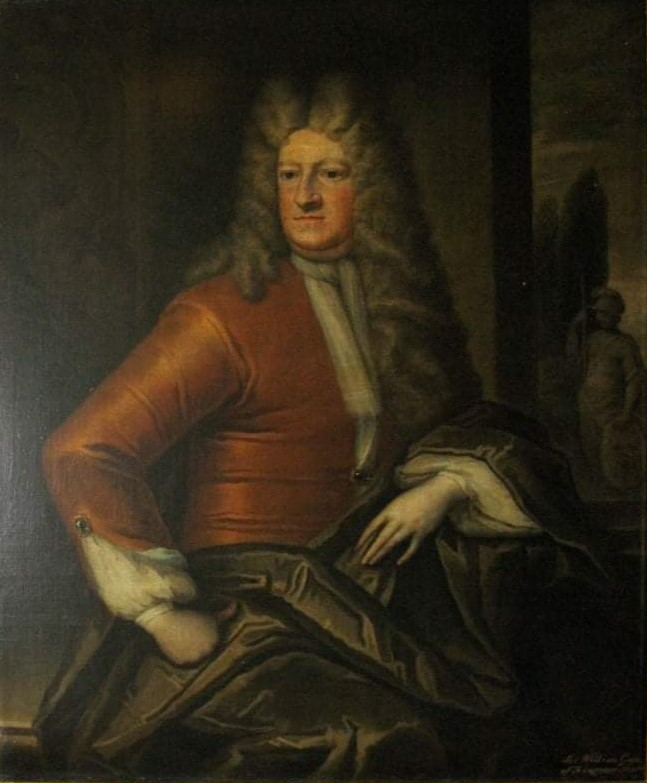
Sir William Gage, 2nd Baronet, circa 1709

Sir William Gage, 2nd Baronet of Hengrave (c. 1650–1727) was an English baronet. He is credited with providing the "greengages", which he introduced to Hengrave Hall from Paris. He was also involved with negotiating with Henry Ashley Jr as regards the development of the River Lark as a navigable thoroughfare prior to the passage of the River Lark Act 1698.

He was the son of Sir Edward Gage, 1st Baronet of Hengrave and his wife Mary Hervey, daughter of Sir William Hervey MP.

Baronetage of England
Preceded by Edward Gage	Baronet (of Hengrave); 1707–1727	Succeeded by Thomas Gage
