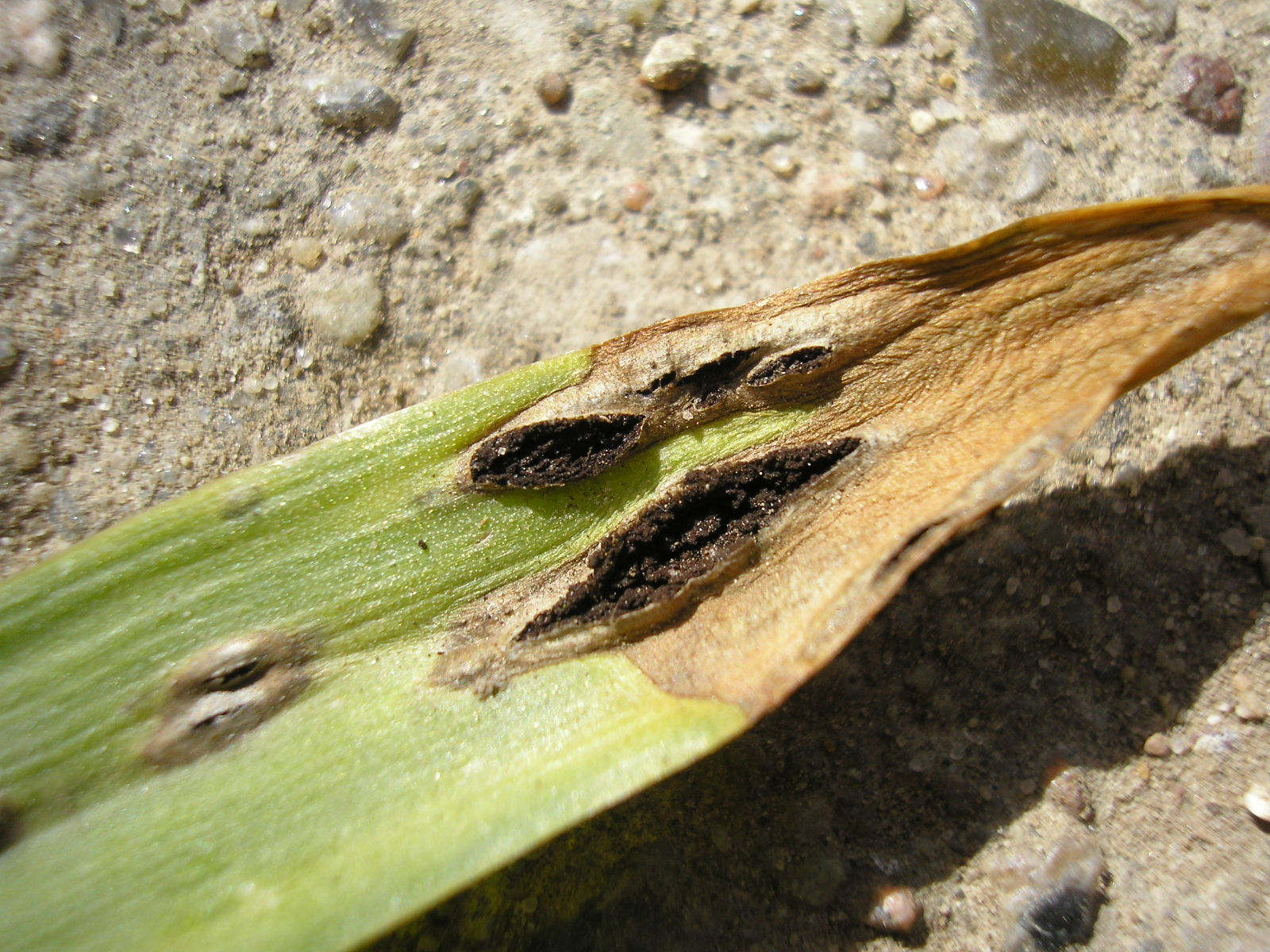

Scientific classification
- Kingdom: Fungi
- Division: Basidiomycota
- Class: Ustilaginomycetes
- Order: Urocystidales
- Family: Urocystidaceae
- Genus: Vankya
- Species: V. ornithogali

Binomial name
- Vankya ornithogali (J.C. Schmidt & Kunze) Ershad

Synonyms
- Uredo ornithogali J.C. Schmidt & Kunze; Ustilago ornithogali (Schmidt & Kunze) Magnus

= Vankya ornithogali =

Species of fungus

Vankya ornithogali is a plant pathogen, also called yellow star-of-Bethlehem smut. It may infect the plant Gagea spathacea.
