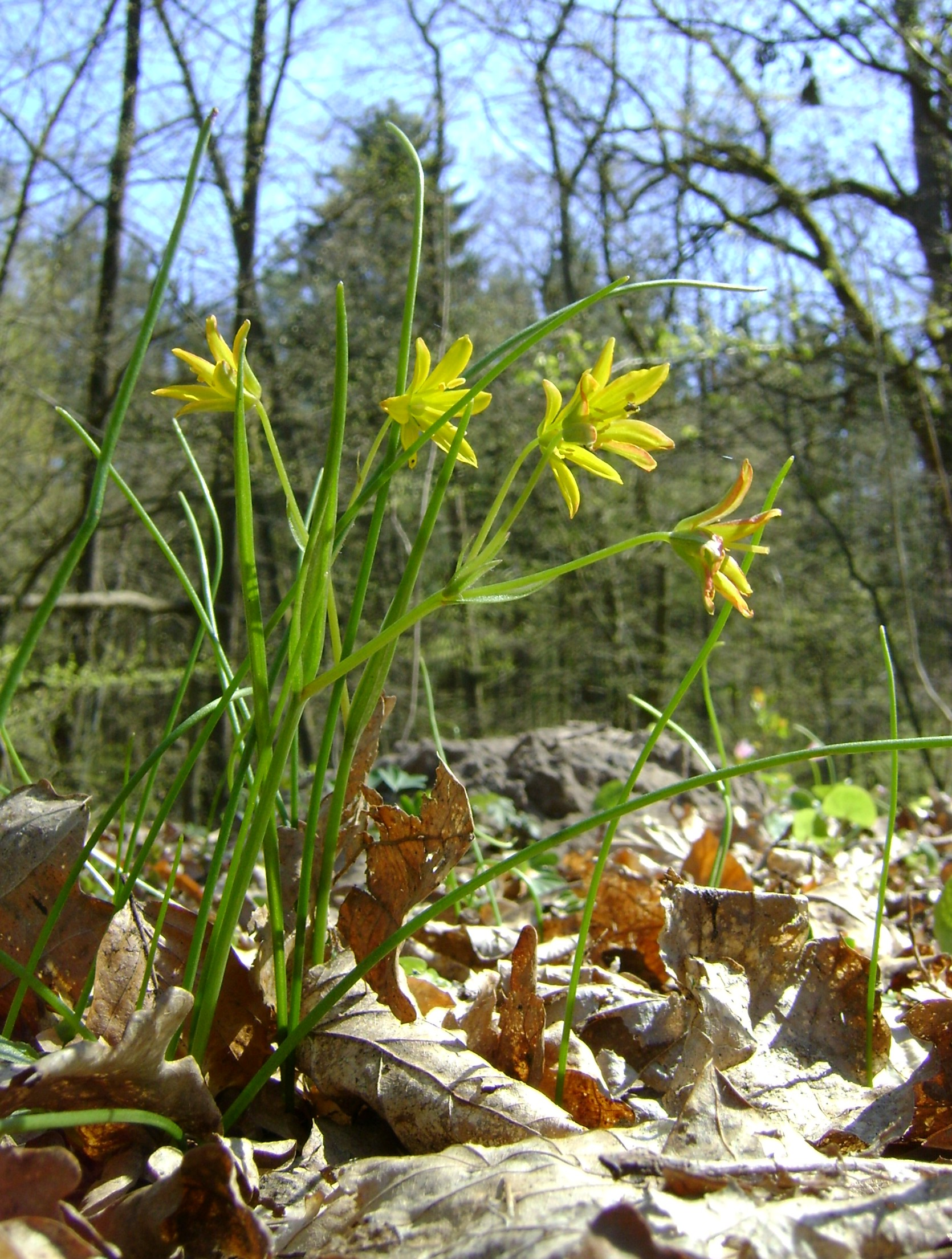

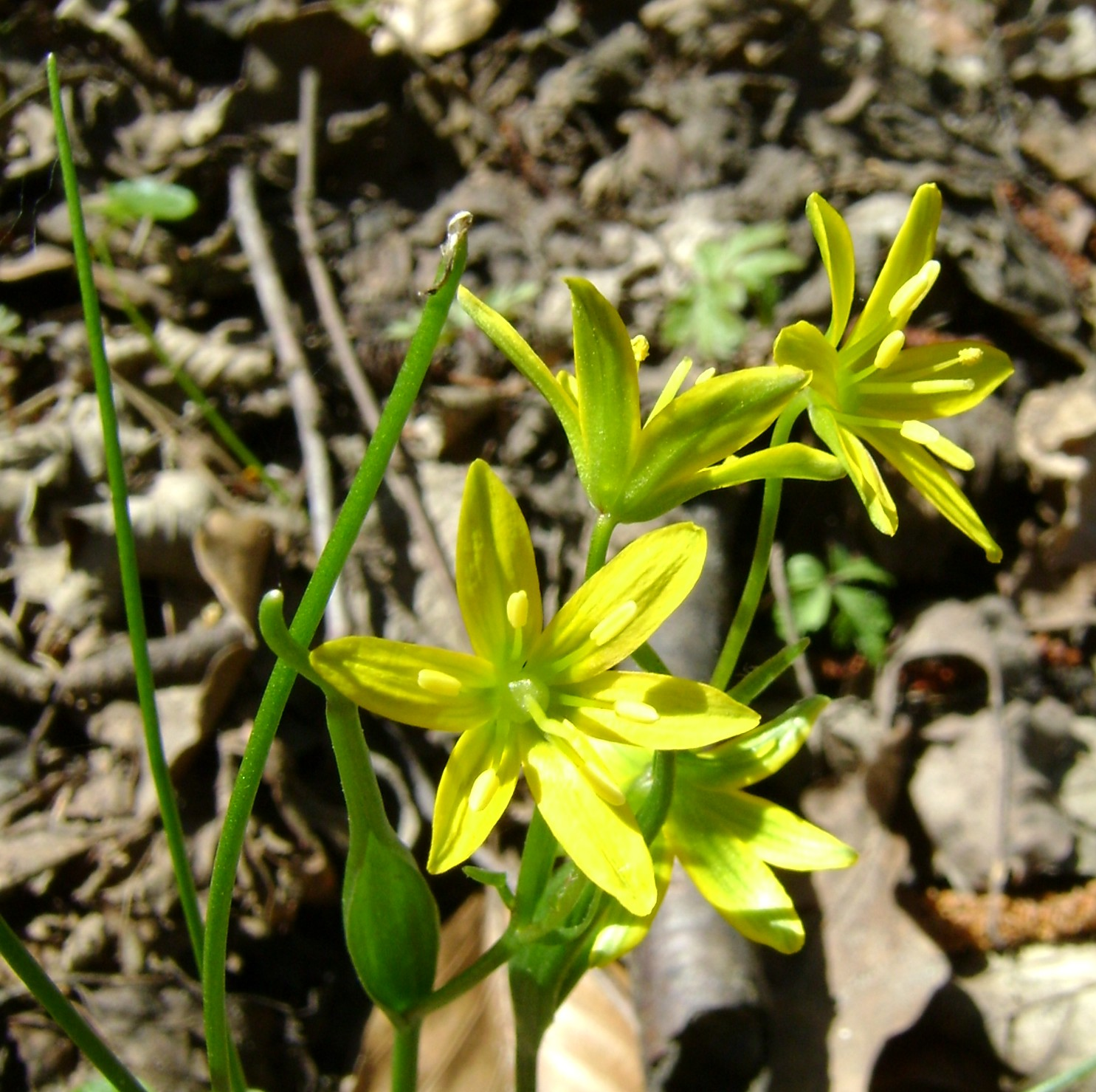

Scientific classification
- Kingdom: Plantae
- Clade: Embryophytes
- Clade: Tracheophytes
- Clade: Spermatophytes
- Clade: Angiosperms
- Clade: Monocots
- Order: Liliales
- Family: Liliaceae
- Subfamily: Lilioideae
- Genus: Gagea
- Species: G. spathacea

Binomial name
- Gagea spathacea (Hayne) Salisb.

Synonyms
- Synonymy: Gagea belgica (Lej.) Dumort.; Gagea spathacea var. transcarpatica Domin; Ornithogalum belgicum Lej.; Ornithogalum heynii Roth; Ornithogalum spathaceum Hayne; Ornithoxanthum spathaceum (Hayne) Link; Stellaster spathaceus (Hayne) Kuntze

= Gagea spathacea =

Species of flowering plant

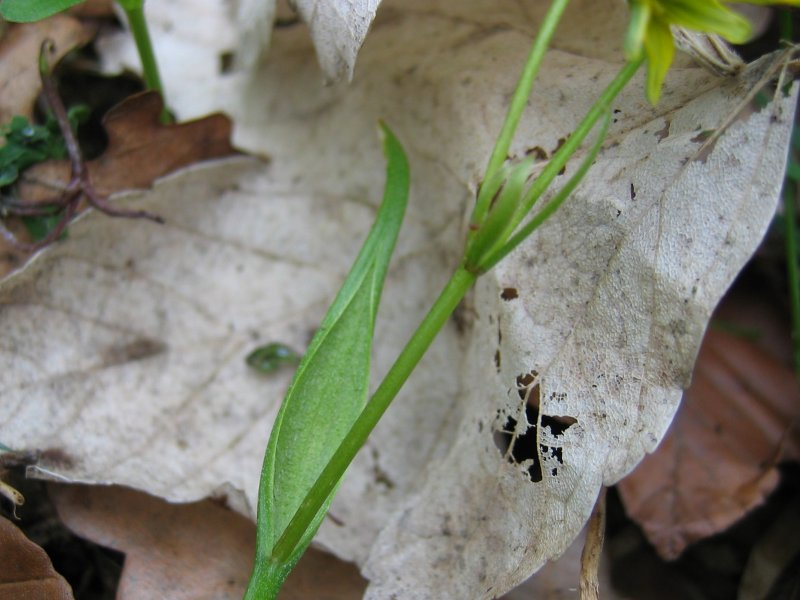
Close-up of the spathe-shaped leaf

Gagea spathacea, the Belgian gagea, is a European species of small bulbous perennial plants in the lily family. It is distinguished from other members of its genus by its large leaves and the lack of any surface ornamentation of its flower stalks and its leaves.

== Description ==
Gagea spathacea is a bulbous perennial plant, usually 15 to 20 cm (5.9 to 7.9 in), up to 25 cm (9.8 in) high. The two bulbs are inequal, ovoid, 10 to 18 mm long, 6 to 10 mm wide, and they are wrapped in a coriaceus bright-brown common tunic. Up to 54 small lateral bulbils are present outside the tunic. From the bulbs arise a stem and two basal leaves.

The stem is erect, solitary, unbranched and glabrous. The basal leaves are usually longer than inflorescence or rarely equal. They are fistular, glabrous, 15 to 20, up to 28 cm long, 1 to 1.5 mm wide. One cauline leaf, oblong-lanceolate, is cucullate and glabrous. There are two glabrous bracts. The lower one is spathulate, 40 to 80 mm long, 4 to 6 mm wide, with 8 to 13 veins. It is slightly longer than the inflorescence or almost equal. The upper bract is linear-lanceolate, with 3 to 5 veins. It is 15 to 25 mm long, 1 to 2 mm wide, 3 to 17 mm above the lower bract.

The inflorescence, flowered in April–May, is an umbel composed of 1–5 flowers. Pedicels are 30 to 45 mm long, glabrous. Bracteoles, located at the base of the pedicels or slightly above, are linear, glabrous and 2 to 15 mm long. The perianth of 6 free segments 10 to 13 mm long, is linear-lanceolate, obtuse, yellow inside and greenish-yellow outside. The 6 stamens are inserted at the base of the perianth. Anthers are basifixed. Fruits are loculicidal subglobose capsules.

=== Similar species ===
In the vegetative state, Gagea spathacea is distinguished by its fistular leaves from Gagea lutea or Hyacinthoides non-scripta, both of them having flat leaves above and a projecting median vein below.

Gagea minima differs from Gagea spathacea by its unique, basal non-fistular leaf, and by its spathe-shape.

== Taxonomy ==
Among the subdivision of the genus Gagea into at least 14 sectional units, the section Spathaceae Levichev comprises a sole species, G. spathacea. The English vernacular name is the Belgian Gagea.

Friedrich Gottlob Hayne first described this species in 1797, and named it Ornithogalum spathaceum. The plant that allowed this first description came from a hardwood, named "Hindschenfelder", located at one mile of Hamburg. The lectotype is hosted at Swedish Museum of Natural History.

In 1806, criticizing the fact that Linnaeus imposed himself as a law to base its genera only on fruits, Richard Anthony Salisbury peak the need to take account of inflorescences. This led him to create a new genus of plants formerly classified as Ornithogalum but having a superior ovary. He named it in honour of the botanist Sir Thomas Gage (1781–1820), a collector and disseminator of rare European plants. The specific epithet spathacea is derived from the spathe-shape leaf.

Gagea spathacea has two homotypic synonyms: Ornithoxanthum spathaceum and Stellaster spathaceus. Heinrich Friedrich Link proposed in 1829 to establish a genus Ornithoxanthum, but it is illegitimate because he gives in synonymy some basionyms of species belonging to the genus Ornithogalum formerly defined. The name Stellaster spathaceus proposed by Otto Kuntze in 1891 is also illegitimate meanwhile he quotes Gagea spathacea Salisbury.

There are also heterotypic synonyms, including Ornithogalum belgicum, described by Alexandre Louis Simon Lejeune in 1824 and renamed in Gagea belgica by Barthélemy Charles Joseph Dumortier in 1829. Another, Ornithogalum heynii was described in 1798 by Albrecht Wilhelm Roth. Finally the variety Gagea spathacea var. transcarpatica described by Karel Domin in 1931 is no longer recognized and is considered as a synonym of Gagea spathacea.

== Biology ==
Gagea spathacea reproduces by vegetative propagation. The plant invests more resources into creating bulbils rather than increasing the size of the main bulb, and that reduces the possibility of flowering. (Note: The flowering begin when the bulb reaches a certain ratio of nutrient reserves. Moreover, Gagea spathacea produces bulbils when the bulb reaches 2.43 mm and flowers at 5.34 mm.) Even when the plant flowers, the inflorescence only attracted 6.1% of nitrogen, against 18.3% for the bulbils: Moreover, only 16.3 ± 22.8% of the pollen grains are viable. The number of pollen grains per anther seems to be smaller, grains are often malformed and stick together. Many populations don't develop seeds. Although no publication attests to sexual reproduction, it can not be totally excluded, since some grains pollen are viable. Finally, parthenogenesis or outcrossing with other gageas are possible, especially as the hybridization is observed in the genus, however, not with Gagea spathacea as parent.

A study of the European populations shows the exclusivity of vegetative reproduction. 138 samples from 52 populations covering most of the species’ distribution range: Netherlands (2), Belgium (1), Sweden (4), Italy (2), Russia (2) and Germany (41). 136 of 138 samples were assigned to a single clone, the two deviating plants originated from one German population and from the Caucasus.

This might be explained by either the high ploidy level (nonaploidy : 9x=108) (Note: Not only are chromosomes numerous, but they also are very long, which complicates the prophase.) and/or the assumed hybridogeneous origin of this taxon. Both of them may do severe problems during meiosis.

However, this vegetative propagation is not a barrier to biological dispersal, as monoclonal population shows. In Sweden, a study proved that Gagea spathacea could colonize new woods connected to former ones by isolated individuals, with subsequent population increase filling in between them. A short dispersal of bulbils may be only explained by translocation of substrate through tree falls, through digging or wallowing activities of animals. For larger dispersal distances, a transport with water streams is possible.

== Disease ==
Gagea spathacea may be infected by the smut fungus Vankya ornithogali (J.C. Schmidt & Kunze) Ershad.

== Distribution and habitat ==
This perennial bulb plant is distributed across northern, central, and eastern Europe. It is most common in northern Germany and adjacent regions (southern Scandinavia, Poland). Large proportions of the world populations of G. spathacea are located in Germany (and especially in the federal state Mecklenburg-Western Pomerania). It is more rare in the western and southern parts of the continent. It has been reported from Denmark, Sweden, France, most of Central Europe, the former Yugoslavia, Belarus, Ukraine, and Russia including the northern Caucasus.

== Bibliography ==
=== Names ===
- Botanic Garden and Botanical Museum Berlin-Dahlem (January 2011). "Ornithogalum spathaceum".
- eMonocot. (1 November 2010). "Gagea spathacea (Hayne) Salisb".
- Genaust, Helmut (2012). Etymologishes wörterbuch der botanishen pflanzennamen (in German). Hamburg: Nikol Verlagsgesellschaft. p. 701. ISBN 978-3-86820-149-9.
- GreenPlantSwap (2013). "Gagea spathacea".

=== Biology and ecology ===
- Brunet, Jörg; Von Oheimb, Goddert (2009). "Migration of vascular plants to secondary woodlands in southern Sweden". Journal of Ecology. 86 (3): 429–438. doi:10.1046/j.1365-2745.1998.00269.x.
- European Environment Agency (2012). "Pannonic hygrophile ash-oak-hornbeam forests".
- Peterson, A.; John, H.; Koch, E.; Peterson, J. (2004). "A molecular phylogeny of the genus Gagea (Liliaceae) in Germany inferred from non-coding chloroplast and nuclear DNA sequences". Plant Systematics and Evolution. 245 (3–4): 145–162. doi:10.1007/s00606-003-0114-y. ISSN 0378-2697.
- Pfeiffer, Tanja; Klahr, Anja; Heinrich, Anita; Schnittler, Martin (April 2011). "Does sex make a difference? Genetic diversity and spatial genetic structure in two co-occurring species of Gagea (Liliaceae) with contrasting reproductive strategies". Plant Systematics and Evolution. 292 (3–4): 189–201. doi:10.1007/s00606-010-0404-0. ISSN 0378-2697.
- Pfeiffer, Tanja; Klahr, Anja; Peterson, Angela; Levichev, Igor G.; Schnittler, Martin (May 2012). "No sex at all? Extremely low genetic diversity in Gagea spathacea (Liliaceae) across Europe". Flora – Morphology, Distribution, Functional Ecology of Plants. 207 (5): 372–378. doi:10.1016/j.flora.2012.03.002. ISSN 0367-2530.
- Terrier, Charles-A (1957). "Note sur le charbon des Gagées : Ustilago ornithogali (Schm. et Kze) magnus" (PDF). Bulletin de la Murithienne (in French) (74): 75–76.
- Toussaint, Benoît, ed. (2011). "Gagea spathacea". Les plantes protégées et menacées de la région Nord-Pas de Calais (in French) (2 ed.). Centre régional de phytosociologie agréé Conservatoire botanique national de Bailleul, avec la collaboration du Collectif botanique du Nord-Pas de Calais. Archived from the original on 3 March 2016.
- E.J. Weeda (March 2006). "Waar de Schedegeelster (Gagea spathacea) zich thuis voelt" (in Dutch). Archived from the original on 28 September 2013.
- Westergård, Mogens (1936). "A cytological study of Gagea spathacea with a note on the chromosome number and embryo-sac formation in Gagea minima". Comptes Rendus des Travaux du Laboratoire Carlsberg Série Physiologique. 21 (18): 437–451.
