= William Wright (English priest) =

English Roman Catholic scholar and Jesuit missionary priest

William Wright (1563 in York, England – 18 January 1639 in London, England) was an English Roman Catholic scholar and Jesuit missionary priest. He was imprisoned after the Gunpowder Plot.

== Life ==
He was born at York, and was educated at St Peter's School, York followed by the English College, Rome. He entered Society of Jesus in 1581, and was professed of the four vows in 1602. He taught as professor of philosophy and theology at Gratz and Vienna.

He joined the English mission in 1606, when he became chaplain to the Gages at Hengrave Hall, Suffolk. He was soon arrested and imprisoned in the Tower of London (July 1607), and later in the White Lion Prison. He opposed the oath of allegiance and supremacy required by James I's government. Supported by his brother Thomas, an ex-Jesuit, Wright disputed publicly against the oath, and the Gages, whom he had instructed, refused to take it.

When the bubonic plague ravaged London and his prison, he nursed the sick; buried the dead, and in the confusion escaped to Leicestershire, where he organized a series of missions, originally called the Residence of St. Anne. From 1612 onwards he took to writing, and a dozen volumes are ascribed to him: three of controversy, the rest translations of the works of Martin Becan, Lessius and others.
