= Mother Mary More =

Mary More (1732–1807) was born to Thomas More and Catherine Gifford, in Barnborough, Yorkshire. She is the last lineal descendant of Sir Thomas More. Mother More is known for being the seventh Prioress at the Priory of Nazareth and leading her community through crises during the reign of Joseph II and the French Revolution.

== Priory of Nazareth ==
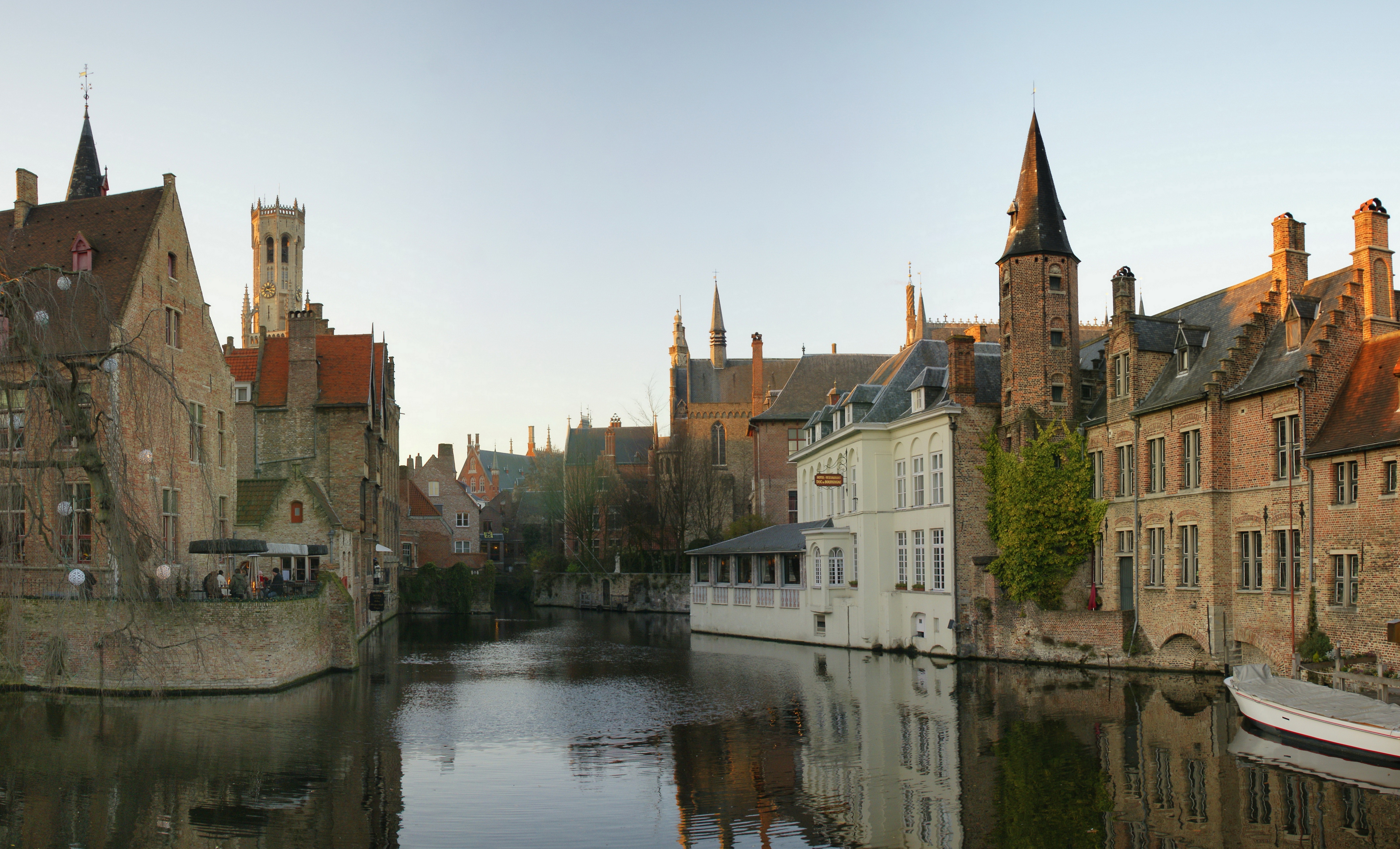
Rozenhoedkaai in Bruges

More made her first profession at the Priory of Nazareth, Bruges, in 1753. Later, in 1766, she would replace Mother Olivia Darrell as the seventh Prioress of the community. The primary job of a canoness was to provide education. The Priory of Nazareth was like a boarding school and was the female counterpart to the Jesuit College at Saint-Omer.

The convent was politically active throughout the eighteenth century and financially supported Prince Charles Edward Stuart as he tried to reclaim the English Throne in 1745, as well as the Patriots of Brabant against Emperor Joseph II.

=== First major crisis ===
In September 1772, under Emperor Joseph II, the Austrian government enforced the suppression of the Society of Jesus by Pope Clement XIV. This led to the siege of Jesuit colleges by Imperial Commissioners in October of the same year. The Commissioners held the masters and superiors while they gave the lay brothers the option of staying in confinement or leaving the town within twenty-four hours. Many of the lay brothers that chose to leave were granted overnight lodging by Mother More, and left the town the next day. Mother More was, however, “obliged to send away two from other Order who had sought refuge with them with great regret.” In 1781 Joseph II took control of the Carmelites, Carthusians and Poor Clares in Bruges. The convent was, however, exempt from some of his laws because it was also a school. Later, when the Jesuits were ordered to return to England, three were held hostage. Mother More who aided these hostages by supplying them with money, information, and eventually helped them escape back to England. In 1783, Mother More was interrogated for her role in the escape of the three hostages. She was accused of embezzling property of the dissolved colleges. It was not uncommon for nuns in a high position to be accused of mismanagement of their community and its funds. Following the interrogation, the commissioners demanded to see the inventory, but More refused and the commissioners did not return. Later, in 1784, Mother More provided assistance and shelter to members of two other communities, the Penitents and the Nuns of Bethania. “Mother More’s resolute leadership is the reason that the community survived as the only English convent remaining in mainland Europe.”

=== Crises: 1790-1802 ===
In November 1790, Bruges was liberated from Imperial forces by the Patriots of Brabant, but it soon fell once again to the Emperor. Joseph II was then succeeded by his brother, Leopold II. Bruges remained under Imperial forces until 1792, when the French Revolutionary Army invaded and seized control. Mother More gave shelter to French refugees, including the “cure of Longuenesse and four Benedictine nuns of Montargis, sister of Lady Jerningham." Mother More relied on protection from General O’Maron, an Irishman serving in the French army.

On Easter Sunday 1793, the Imperial army took back Bruges and a “brief period of calm” ensued. With England and France at war, the nuns were worried and aware that the French might re-take Bruges, so Mother More made sure she and her community were ready to leave. Upon hearing that the French army was indeed coming, the community left the convent, hoping to flee to England. However, upon leaving, the nuns learned the French planned to use the convent as a hospital. This prompted Mother More to send back four nuns to keep possession of the convent. Eventually, the French failed to take the convent and Bruges.

Victory was short lived for Mother More’s community. When the French took Ypres, the nuns were encouraged to flee to the Antwerp convent for nuns from Ghent and leave the older, slower nuns behind. Mother More would not just leave them behind. She gave them the option to leave for Antwerp or to stay. Those who stayed were put under the charge of Sr. Olivia Darrell, the former Prioress.

=== Exile ===
More and the rest of the community that fled traveled for seven days. More had been researching possible places of refuge in England before they had left, but was not immediately successful. During their first few weeks in London, the nuns lodged in various housing throughout the city. The nuns were mainly taken in by relatives of the community. Mother More urged the need for the community to find a “retreat that was discreet, permanent, and secure.”. Eventually, they settled in Hengrave Hall near Bury St. Edmunds in Suffolk, owned by Sir Thomas Gage. Gage’s aunt was a former member of the community who had died in 1772. Gage charged More £60 per year for rent. More was extremely happy with the placement saying, “that the house resembles a convent by having cloisters below and galleries above.” More and the rest of the community began furnishing the estate by making makeshift beds and furniture. The house also did not have direct access to water and the nuns had to take turns carrying water from the horseponds to the house.

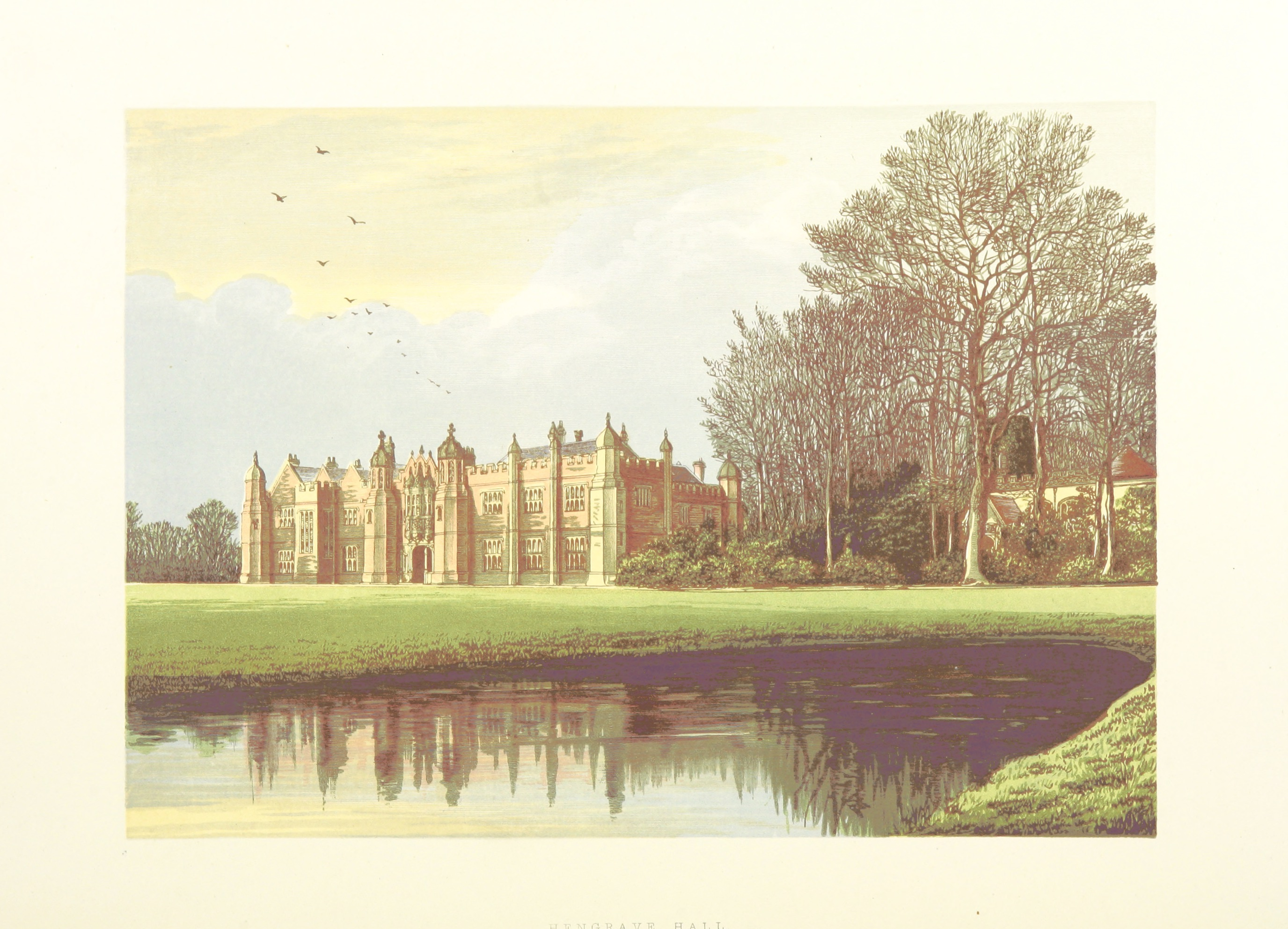
Hengrave Hall

Once they were settled in Hengrave, Mother More attempted to get in touch with those who had stayed behind. However, upon realizing they had not gotten to London, she made inquiries and discovered that Bruges was full of French troops and the nuns would be unable to leave or stay in contact. Prior to learning this, More had sent £125 for their safe passage to London, but it never got to them. It was not until a year later that the nuns were able to take up normal office times and were allowed to wear their habits. In order to do so More had to be granted permission by the Archbishop of Canterbury and two members of parliament. The nuns were not allowed to worship openly because Catholicism was not allowed in England, following the rule of Henry VIII.

Beginning in the summer of 1795, with the help of Sir Thomas Gage and the urging of Mother More, Hengrave Hall was renovated in order to complete and improve the chapel and donations began coming in from local citizens. They donated an organ, candlesticks, food, wine, hourglasses, cooking supplies, and money to make or mend their habits. The local people were very generous and regarded the nuns with much respect. Mother More went against the order’s rules about not being allowed to do any work for secular persons in order to pay for necessities and rent, which she believed to be justified. The nuns would embroider and make pincushions. In 1795 they made £50 and in 1796 they were able to increase their wages to £113. As the nuns began to live life normally, the canonesses decided to re-open their school, even though they only had two students.

Mother More was instrumental in organizing the necessities at Hengrave to get life back to being as normal as possible. In January 1796, More traveled to the Quarter Sessions in Bury. There she took the oath, required under the Roman Catholic Relief Act 1791 (31 Geo. 3. c. 32), to set up a school and licensed Catholic chapel. She had previously begun writing to the Vicars in charge of the Diocese of Bruges to ask permission for the sisters that had remained there to travel to England. While the nuns, with the exception of Sr. Olivia Darrell, eventually made their way to Hengrave, some died soon after the trip.

In the years following, pupils of the convent began making their first profession. However, because laws made under the rule of Charles II in 1660 to re-establish the position of the Church of England, government officials inquired about whether the convent had received any new members, which was not allowed. This is another aspect of More’s life as Prioress that is not particularly uncommon around this time. There is evidence of many convents going against the law to continue their teaching and expand their community.

== Return to Bruges ==
In March 1802, the Peace of Amiens was signed by Napoleon and the British government. This treaty forced the acceptance and toleration of Christianity in France. Now, it was up to Mother More to decide whether or not to return to Bruges or stay at Hengrave Hall. More held a vote to decide and twenty of twenty-five voted to return. “The Bury and Norwich Post announced the nuns' imminent departure with great sadness. Local people would miss 'the courtesy shown to their visitors by the sequestered females and their amiable patroness, Mrs. More'.” On their journey back, no one would allow Mother More to pay for lodging, showing her great respect. Upon returning to Bruges, Mother More and her community were welcomed back with open arms and chants of “long live the Nuns!” Although warmly welcomed, More’s community had to slowly and incrementally regain their status within the new French laws.

== Death and legacy ==
In her final year, Mother More, “gave herself up to prayer, reading, and needlework, which continued until her hands were too weak to hold the needle.” Mother More received Last Rites on March 5, 1807 and died later that month. (picture- https://francisyoung.files.wordpress.com/2015/08/more-inscription.jpg)

“The convent annals record that 'nature had endowed her with a fine intelligence, capable of grasping great things as well as little ones . . . She was able to adapt herself with ease to every situation, not without that sense of humour common to her race and reminiscent of her illustrious ancestor, St Thomas More.’” Francis Young wrote, “The memory of Mother More and of her community's sometimes mundane but nevertheless heroic struggle to maintain its ancient form of life in the face of persecution and indifference is preserved both at Bruges and Hengrave.”

== Bibliography ==
- Bowden, Caroline. The English Convents in Exile, 1600-1800: Communities, Culture and Identity. (Ashgate Publishing, 2013)
- Guilday, Peter. The English Catholic Refugees on the Continent. (London:Longmans, Green, and Co, 1914)
- Mason, Margaret J. (1995). Nuns of the Jerningham Letters: Elizabeth Jerningham (1727–1807) and Frances Henrietta Jerningham (1745–1824), Augustinian Canonesses of Bruges. Recusant History, 22, pp 350–369. doi:10.1017/S0034193200001965.
- Moutray, Tonya J. Refugee Nuns, the French Revolution, and British Literature and Culture. (New York: Routledge, 2016)
- O’Brien, Charles H. Ideas of Religious Toleration at the Time of Joseph II. A Study of the Enlightenment among Catholics in Austria. Vol. 59, No. 7 (1969), pp. 1–80 Published by: American Philosophical Society DOI: 10.2307/1006062
- Proctor, Candice E. Women, Equality, and the French Revolution. (Greenwood Press, 1990)
- Young, Francis (2005). Mother Mary More and the Exile of the Augustinian Canonesses of Bruges in England: 1794–1802. Recusant History, 27, pp 86–102. doi:10.1017/S0034193200031186.
