= The Speeches at Prince Henry's Barriers =

Masque (play) by Ben Jonson

The Speeches at Prince Henry's Barriers, sometimes called The Lady of the Lake, is a masque or entertainment written by Ben Jonson in honour of Henry Frederick, Prince of Wales, the son and heir of King James I of England. The speeches were performed on 6 January 1610 in conjunction with the ceremony known as Prince Henry's Barriers.

== Barriers ==
Prince Henry's Barriers was a stylized martial combat, conducted on foot with swords and pikes; it was something like a joust without horses. The entertainment took place in the Banqueting House at Whitehall Palace.

Though ceremonial in nature, the practice had some inherent risk (as jousting did), and the sixteen-year-old Prince Henry had to persuade his reluctant father to allow his participation. The ceremonial challenge that initiated the barriers occurred on 31 December 1609; Prince Henry then kept an "open table" at St. James's Palace, which cost £100 per day. The Prince was supported by a team of six nobles and gentlemen: Ludovic Stewart, 2nd Duke of Lennox; Thomas Howard, 21st Earl of Arundel; Henry Wriothesley, 3rd Earl of Southampton; James Hay, 1st Earl of Carlisle; Sir Robert Gordon, and Sir Thomas Somerset. The seven met fifty-eight challengers during the Barriers; "each bout consisted of two pushes with the pike and twelve sword-strokes, and the young prince gave or received that night thirty-two pushes and about 360 strokes."

Thomas Chaloner, the Prince's chamberlain, obtained pikes and tiltstaves for the combat from Thomas Lincoln, yeoman of the armoury at Greenwich Palace. David Murray bought pearls for the Prince's costume. After the combat, prizes were awarded to the Earl of Montgomery, Thomas, son of Lord Darcy, and Robert Gordon.

== Show ==
Barriers ceremonies were often lushly decorated and costumed. As with Jonson's other masques for the Court, the sets and costumes for Prince Henry's Barriers were designed by Inigo Jones. Jones was given £150 in December 1609, for works at the barriers "agreeable to the Prince's disposition", a part payment for the "works, which apperteineth to the Shewe". Jonson's text for the speeches that preceded the combat involve figures of Arthurian legend. Henry was introduced as Meliades, a son of the Scottish queen by Meliadus of Lyonesse. The speeches prophesied a revival of British chivalry.

The Lady of the Lake inaugurates the work, at the site of the tomb of Merlin the Magician. Arthur participates in the form of a star above the scene. (Arthur represented James, who never took part directly in masques and entertainments.) Merlin rises from his tomb; he and the Lady condemn the contemporary decay of chivalry, but predict its restoration under the new reign of the House of Stuart. (Jones's two sets supported this theme; one was a ruined House of Chivalry, and the other, St. George's Portico.) The Lady and Merlin call forth "Meliadus, lord of the isles," (Henry). Merlin summarizes British history; then a personified spirit of Chivalry emerges, after which the barriers combat took place.

Jonson had to tread lightly between the King's well-known pacifism and the Prince's more martial frame of mind. He had the Lady of the Lake present the Prince with a shield, rather than the more usual and typical sword, like the shield given by Thetis to Achilles in the Iliad. Merlin warns the young Prince to beware of militaristic urges. The name "Meliadus," or "Moeliades," applied to Henry in Jonson's text, is an anagram for Miles a Deo, "soldier of God." The Arthurian theme was the Prince's idea rather than Jonson's, who in fact disparaged Arthurian romance, and preferred James's suspicion of militarism to Henry's enthusiasm.

Jonson's text was first published in the first folio collection of Jonson's works in 1616, and was thereafter included in editions of his works.
