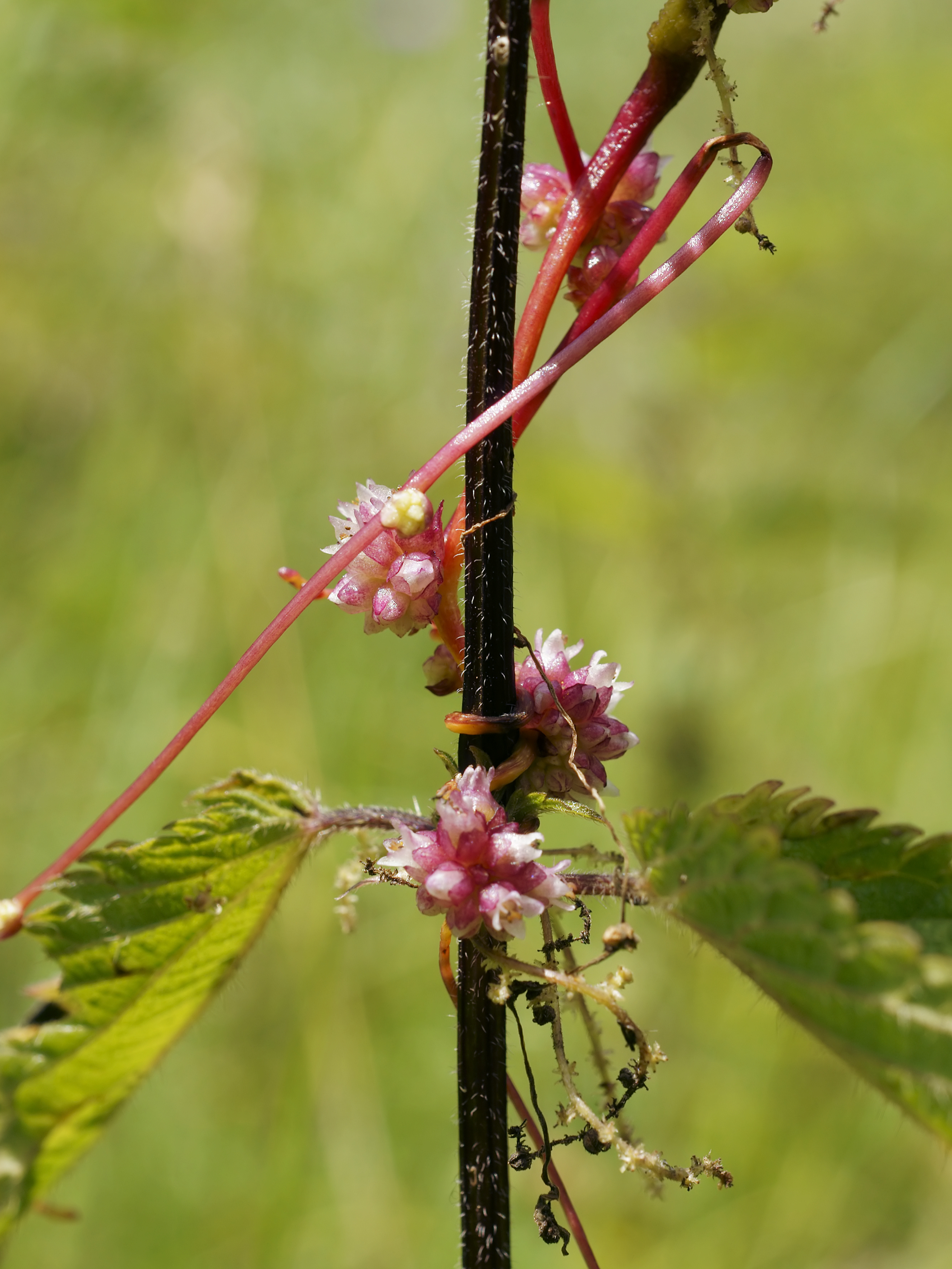

Scientific classification
- Kingdom: Plantae
- Clade: Tracheophytes
- Clade: Angiosperms
- Clade: Eudicots
- Clade: Asterids
- Order: Solanales
- Family: Convolvulaceae
- Genus: Cuscuta
- Species: C. europaea

Binomial name
- Cuscuta europaea L.

Synonyms
- Cuscuta halophyta Fr.

= Cuscuta europaea =

Species of flowering plant

Cuscuta europaea, the greater dodder or European dodder, is a parasitic plant native to Europe, which belongs to the family Convolvulaceae, but was formerly classified in the family Cuscutaceae. It grows on Asteraceae, Cannabaceae, Amaranthaceae, Fabaceae, Urticaceae and other herbaceous plants, including garden plants such as Coleus and Impatiens, and more occasionally on Humulus. It is a notable parasite of lucerne (Medicago sativa). In many regions, including the Nepal Eastern Himalayas, this species are used as traditional medicine to treat hepatic diseases.

== Description ==
The long thin stems of C. europaea are yellowish or reddish. They have an inflorescence that is produced laterally along the stems, the flowers are arranged in compact glomerules with few to many flowers. The pedicels are up to 1.5 millimetres (0.059 in) long. The 1.5 mm calyx is cup-shaped with 4 or 5 sepals that are triangular-ovate in shape. The 2.5–3 millimetres (0.098–0.118 in) corolla is pink, with 4 or sometime 5 lobes. The corolla remains after anthesis and is often reflexed. The stamens are inserted below sinus and the filaments are longer than the anthers. The anthers are ovate-circular with very thin scales. The ovary is subglobose with 2 styles. The stigmas are divergent or curved. The 3 mm wide, rounded seed capsule, is capped by the withered corolla. Each capsule often has 4, pale brown, elliptic, seeds that are 1 mm long.

== Distribution ==
Cuscuta europaea can now be found in Japan and Algiers, as well as N Africa, W Asia and Europe. In India and Pakistan, the species occurs in the Himalayas, stretching from Kashmir to Sikkim on an altitude of 3,600 metres (11,800 ft).

== Etymology ==
Derived from the Arabic word kechout, Cuscuta was the name used for this plant by Rufinus, a thirteenth-century botanist. The specific epithet europaea means 'European' or 'of Europe'.

== Invasive species ==
C. europaea was introduced to North America, where it is considered to be an invasive species in Maine. In 1979 Holm described the weed as 'serious' in Afghanistan and Poland while it was 'principal' in Czechoslovakia and the Soviet Union. P. Wolswinkel, during the same year, also took note on its invasiveness, as the species was feeding on faba bean. In 1983, Wolswinkel and Ammerlaan had seen another damage that was caused by this plant, after finding dry matter and ash in the nettle and Aegopodium podagraria species. The species which were affected had 8.5% less chlorophyll, which C. europaea drains out of its host plants, as was suggested by Gal'vidis in 1993. In Italy, former Yugoslavia and eastern Europe the species was known to infest sugar beet as well being poisonous to livestock, such as horses.
