= Thomas Gage (botanist) =

British botanist (1781-1820)

Sir Thomas Gage, 7th Baronet, of Hengrave (1781 – 27 December 1820, in Rome) was an English botanist from Rokewode-Gage baronets. The woodland flower Gagea is named in his honour.

He married Mary-Anne Browne, the daughter of Valentine Browne, 1st Earl of Kenmare.

His marble gravestone in the Church of the Gesù had an inscription stating that he lived for 38 years, 8 months and 25 days.

In his herbarium he had various plant specimens including Iris subbiflora.

Peerage of England
Preceded by Thomas Gage	Baronet (of Hengrave, Suffolk); 1798–1820	Succeeded by Thomas Rokewode-Gage
