= Thomas Darcy, 1st Earl Rivers =

English peer and courtier

The Right Honourable The Earl Rivers
- 1st Earl Rivers
- Tenure: 1626–1640
- Successor: John Savage, 2nd Earl Rivers
- Other titles: Viscount Colchester; Baron Darcy of Chiche
- Born: Thomas Darcy c. 1565
- Died: 25 February 1640 (aged 74–75); Winchester House, London
- Buried: St Osyth, St Peter and St Paul church, Essex; 51.79863°N 1.07724°E
- Spouse: Mary Kitson
- Issue: Thomas Darcy; Edward Darcy; Elizabeth Darcy; Mary Darcy; Penelope Darcy; Susan Darcy
- Parents: John Darcy, 2nd Baron Darcy of Chiche; Frances Rich

Thomas Darcy, 1st Earl Rivers (c. 1565 – 25 February 1640) was an English peer and courtier in the reigns of Elizabeth I, James I and Charles I.

== Early life ==
He was the son of John Darcy, 2nd Baron Darcy of Chiche and Frances Rich. His grandfather was Thomas Darcy, 1st Baron Darcy of Chiche, a supporter of Lady Jane Grey. He succeeded to his father's title as 3rd Baron Darcy of Chiche in March 1581. In 1613, he obtained a new grant of the Barony of Darcy of Chiche with a special remainder, on the failure of his male issue, to his son-in-law, Sir Thomas Savage, and his heirs. He attended the courts of Elizabeth I and James I, and was created Viscount Colchester in the Peerage of England on 5 July 1621. During the reign of Charles I, Darcy was further honoured when he was made Earl Rivers on 4 November 1626. Both of these titles were created with the special remainder to Sir Thomas Savage and his heirs.

*Chiche was the old name for St Osyth, Essex.

== Marriage and children ==
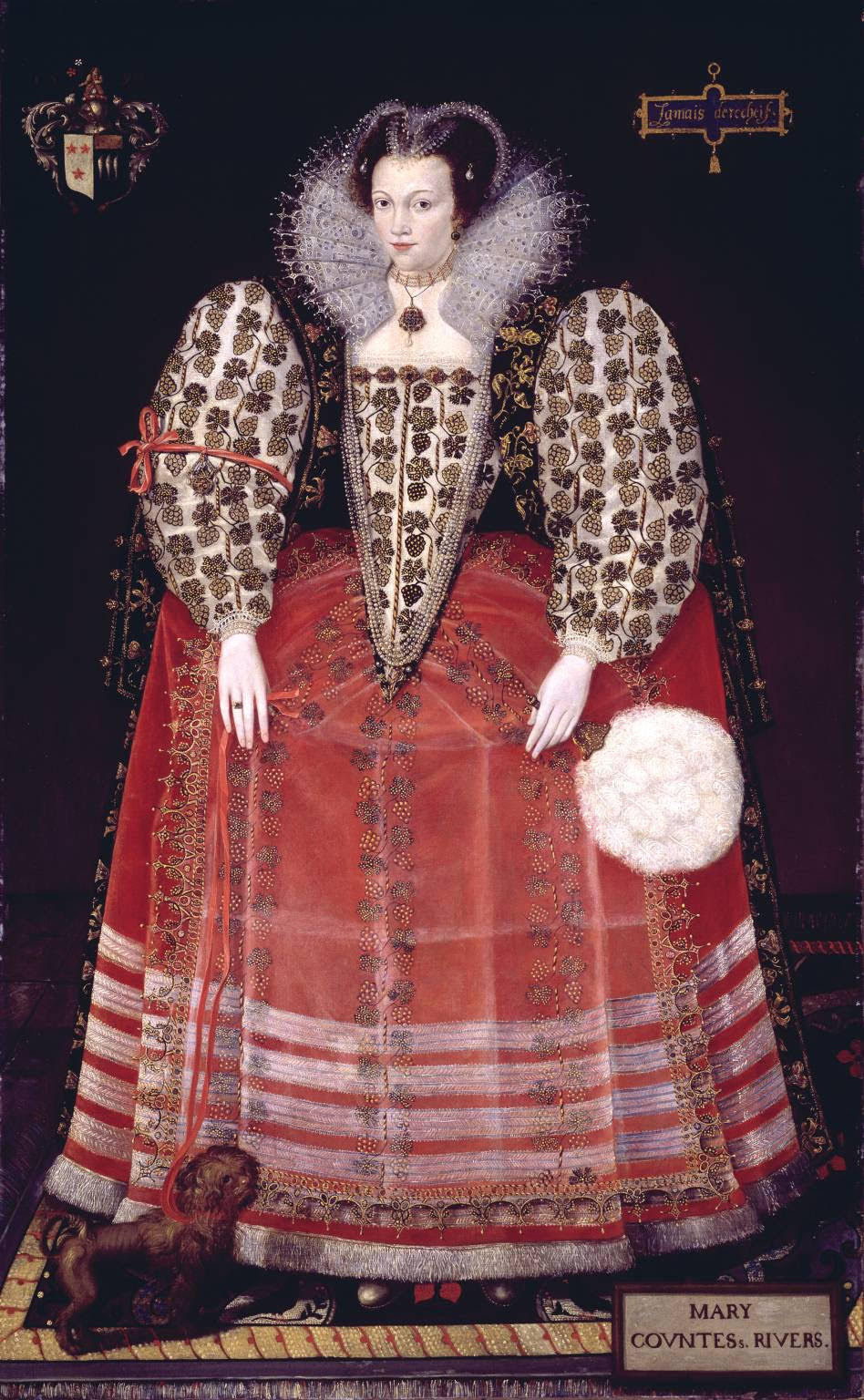
Mary Kitson, Countess Rivers, c. 1590

Earl Rivers married Mary Kitson, a daughter of Sir Thomas Kitson, and by her had issue:

- Thomas Darcy (d. 1614). He was a page to Prince Henry and performed at the tournament Prince Henry's Barriers in January 1610.
- Elizabeth Darcy (1581–1651), married Thomas Savage, 1st Viscount Savage and had issue, including John Savage, 2nd Earl Rivers
- Mary Darcy (d. 31 July 1627), married in 1615, Roger Manwood (1591–1623), without issue
- Penelope Darcy (d. 1661), a noted recusant, married firstly, 11 June 1610, as his second wife, Sir George Trenchard (c.1575–1610) of Wolveton, secondly, in 1611, Sir John Gage, 1st Baronet, by whom she had issue, and thirdly, Sir William Hervey in 1642
- Susan Darcy, died unmarried

== Death and succession ==
The Earl died on 25 February 1640 at Winchester House, near Broad Street, London and was buried with his ancestors at St Osyth, Essex. He was succeeded in his titles, except for the original barony of Darcy of Chiche of 1581, by his grandson, John Savage, 2nd Earl Rivers.

An inventory was made of the goods of Mary Countess-Dowager Rivers on 28 June 1644. The furnishings are listed in the rooms of an unnamed house, not St Osyth's Priory.

== Notes ==
Peerage of England
New creation	Earl Rivers; 2nd creation 1626–1640	Succeeded by John Savage
New creation	Viscount Colchester; 1st creation 1621–1640	Succeeded by John Savage
Preceded by John Darcy	Baron Darcy of Chiche; 1st creation 1581–1640	Extinct
New creation	Baron Darcy of Chiche; 2nd creation 1613–1640	Succeeded by John Savage
