= Rokewode-Gage baronets =

Extinct baronetcy in the Baronetage of England

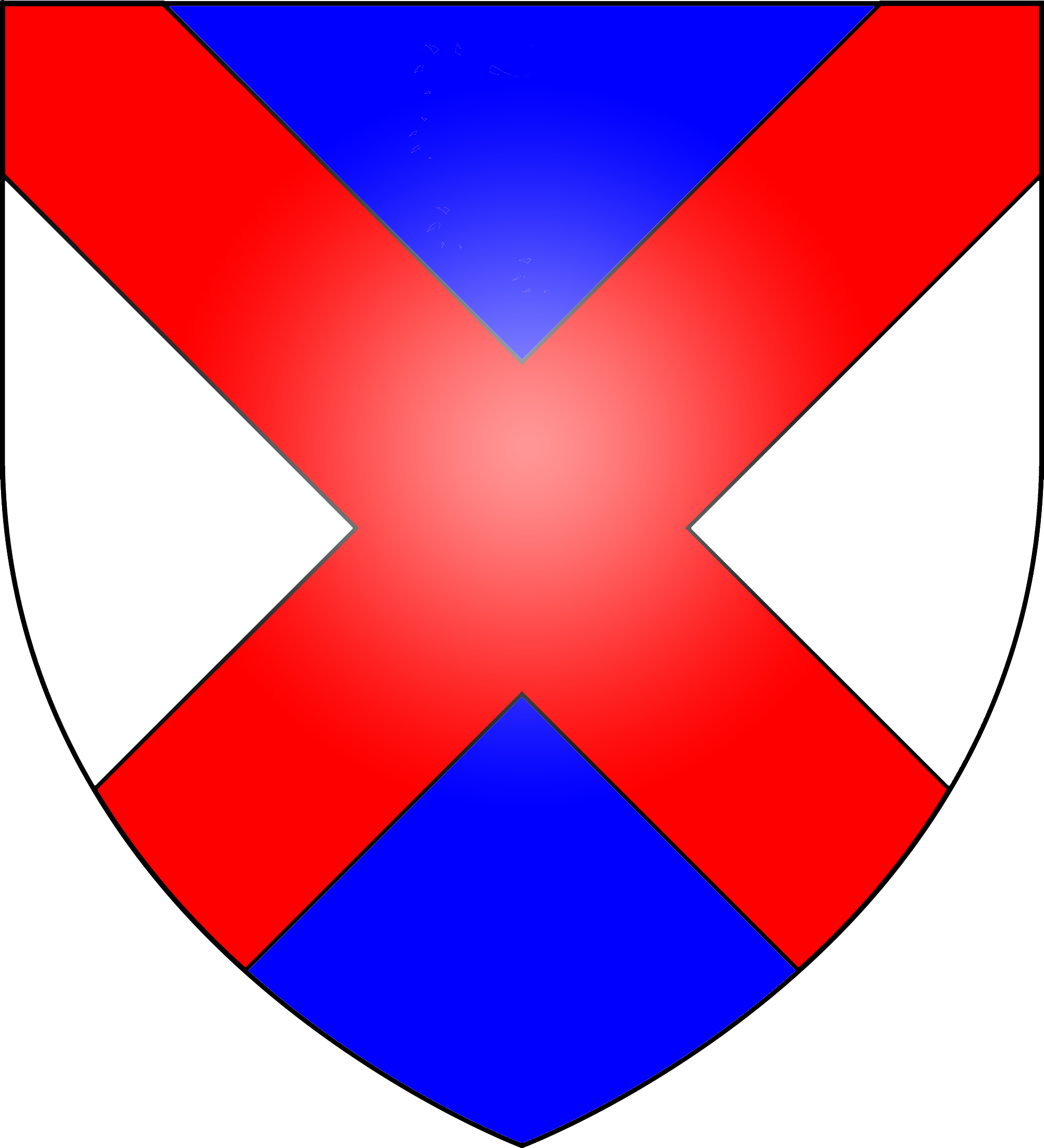
The coat of arms of the Gage family of Hengrave: Per saltire Azure and Argent a saltire Gules.

The Gage, later Rokewode-Gage Baronetcy, of Hengrave in the County of Suffolk, was a title in the Baronetage of England. It was created on 15 July 1662 for Edward Gage. The eighth Baronet assumed in 1843 by Royal licence the additional surname of Rokewode in compliance with the will of his uncle, John Gage Rokewode. The title became extinct on the death of the ninth Baronet in 1872.

== Gage, later Rokewode-Gage baronets, of Hengrave (1662) ==
- Sir Edward Gage, 1st Baronet (c. 1626–1707)
- Sir William Gage, 2nd Baronet (c. 1651–1727)
- Sir Thomas Gage, 3rd Baronet (c. 1710–1741)
- Sir William Gage, 4th Baronet (c. 1712–1767)
- Sir Thomas Rookwood Gage, 5th Baronet (c. 1720–1796)
- Sir Thomas Gage, 6th Baronet (c. 1752–1798)
- Sir Thomas Gage, 7th Baronet (1781–1820)
- Sir Thomas Rokewode-Gage, 8th Baronet (1810–1866)
- Sir Edward Rokewode-Gage, 9th Baronet (1812–1872)

Coat of arms of Rokewode-Gage of Hengrave
Crest A ram passant Argent, armed Or (Gage); A chessrook Sable, winged Argent (Rokewode). Escutcheon Quarterly: 1st and 4th, gyronny of four Azure and Argent, a saltire Gules (Gage); 2nd and 3rd: Argent, six chessrooks, three, two, and one Sable (Rokewode) Motto Over crests, 1st: Bon temps viendra; 2nd: Tout est Dieu.
