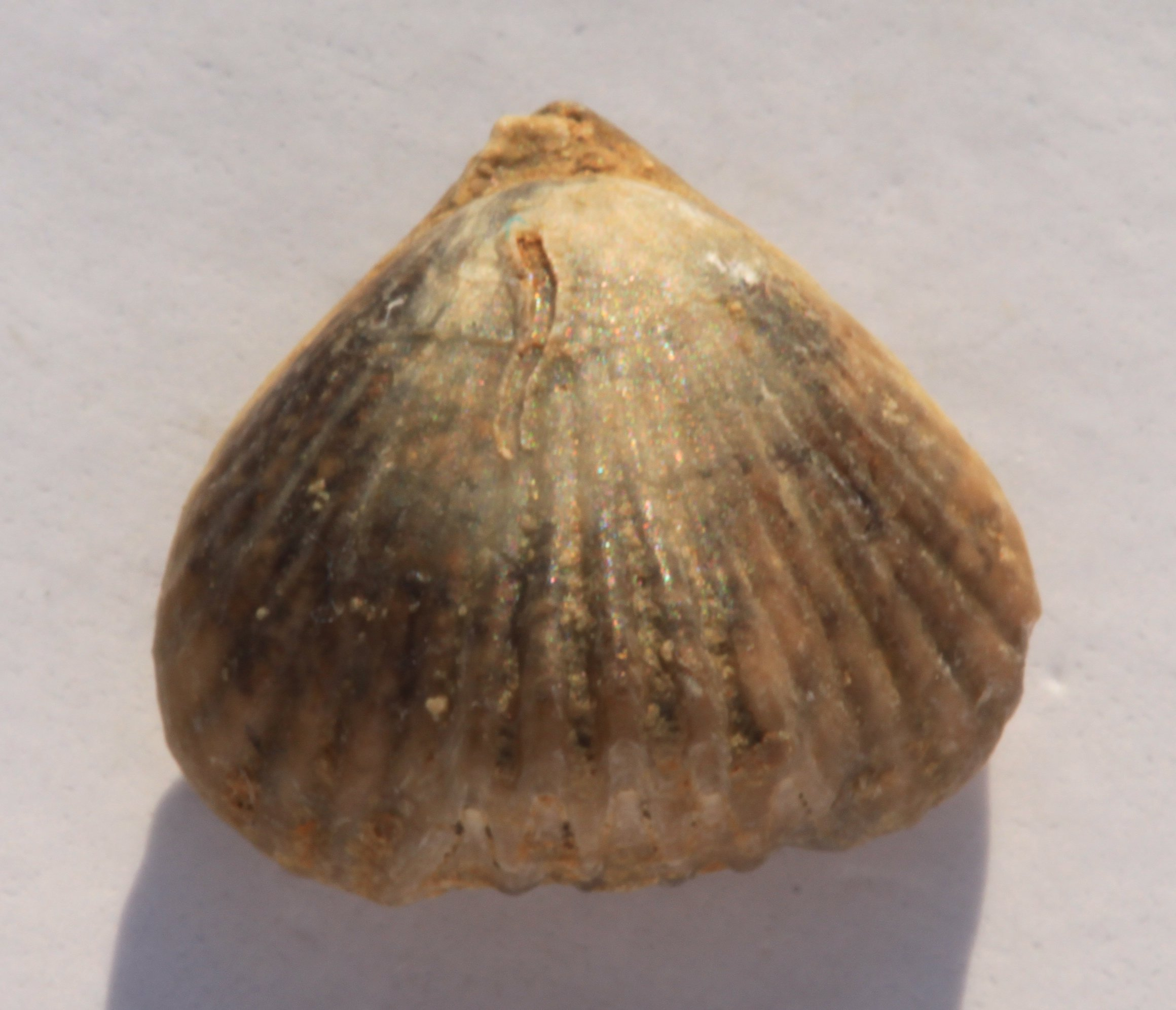
- Rhynchonelloidella alemanica, brachial valve

Scientific classification
- Kingdom: Animalia
- Phylum: Brachiopoda
- Class: Rhynchonellata
- Order: Rhynchonellida
- Family: †Rhynchonellidae
- Genus: †Rhynchonelloidella
- Species: †R. alemanica

Binomial name
- †Rhynchonelloidella alemanica (Rollier, 1911)

Synonyms
- Rhynchonella varians (Schlotheim); Rhynchonella alemanica Rollier 1911; Not Ivanoviella alemanica (Rollier)

= Rhynchonelloidella alemanica =

Rhynchonelloidella alemanica Temporal range: Middle Jurassic, 168–165 Ma

Species of marine lamp shell

Rhynchonelloidella alemanica is a species of extinct, small-sized brachiopod, a marine rhynchonellate lampshell in the family Rhynchonellidae. It is roughly 1.4 cm (0.55 in), and has about 15 ribs fanning out from the hinge.

== Distribution ==
Rhynchonelloidella alemanica is known from the later Middle Jurassic (Bathonian) of France, Germany and Switzerland. The specimen that the description is based upon was collected in Lorraine, France (lectotype).

== Habitat ==
During the Middle Jurassic, the fossil locations cited were on continental shelves, probably in tropical, shallow coral seas, where this lampshell lived as a stationary epifaunal suspension feeder.

== Description ==
Rhynchonelloidella alemanica has small sized shells, subtrigonal to slightly subpentagonal in outline, with wide hinge line; inequivalve, almost plano-convex; dorsal valve markedly everted anteriorly, giving shell subcynocephalous to cynocephalus profile. Lateral commissures deflected ventrally at 15 to 30 degrees; anterior commissure highly uniplicate; linguiform extension high and narrow, top truncated. Beak short, pointed, substraight to suberect; foramen large, oval in shape, hypothyridid, with well developed rim; deltidial plates wide, disjunct to just conjunct; beak ridges angular, extending laterally; interareas well defined and slightly concave with fine growth lines. Ventral valve gently convex at posterior and flattened anteriorly; sulcus well developed, deep and narrow, with flat bottom, occurring at about posterior 1/3 of valve, abruptly separated from slopes and turning over towards dorsal valve sharply at frontal margin, resulting in high linguiform extension. Dorsal valve moderately convex at umbonal region, but less tumid than in Rhynchonelloidella smithi, norelliform stage feebly recognizable, sulcation short or even absent; fold eminent, narrow and well elevated over slopes with steep flanks, occurring at about posterior 1/3 to 1/2 of valve and making valve trilobate anteriorly. In some specimens, umbonal region more or less depressed, smooth area generally short or absent. Costae numerous, subangular, on each valve numbering 19-26, with 4-6 on fold and 3-5 in sinus; growth lines feeble, only visible at anterior margin. At gerontic stage, Shell thickened markedly along margins and frontal margin somewhat truncated, reminiscent of Goniorhynchia boueti (Davidson 1852).

Interior. — Secondary thickenings in apical cavities of both valves. No pedicle collar observed in sectioned specimens; delthyrium wide, trapezoidal to rectangular in shape; lateral cavities narrow and short; dental plates thick and long, beyond hinge zone and divergent to ventral floor, or subparallel; teeth fairly strong, massive and mallet-like, held tightly in sockets; accessory denticulars and dental cavities present. Septalium variably developed, generally short and V-shaped; septum low and massive, only supporting septalium at very posterior part and most part of it existing as a median ridge, running about 1/3 or more of dorsal valve length; hinge plates relatively thick and broad, almost horizontal or slightly inclined ventrally at anterior parts; inner socket ridges well developed, but not strong; crural bases narrow, well formed and given off dorsally from inner margins of hinge plates; crura thick, about 1/4 to 1/3 dorsal valve length, calcarifer, incurved ventrally at anterior parts.

The anatomical terms used in this description have been defined by Williams and Brunton, 1997 can be found at the website on the Trenton Group fossils of the Department of Invertebrate Palaeontology of Harvard University.

== Pictures from all sides ==
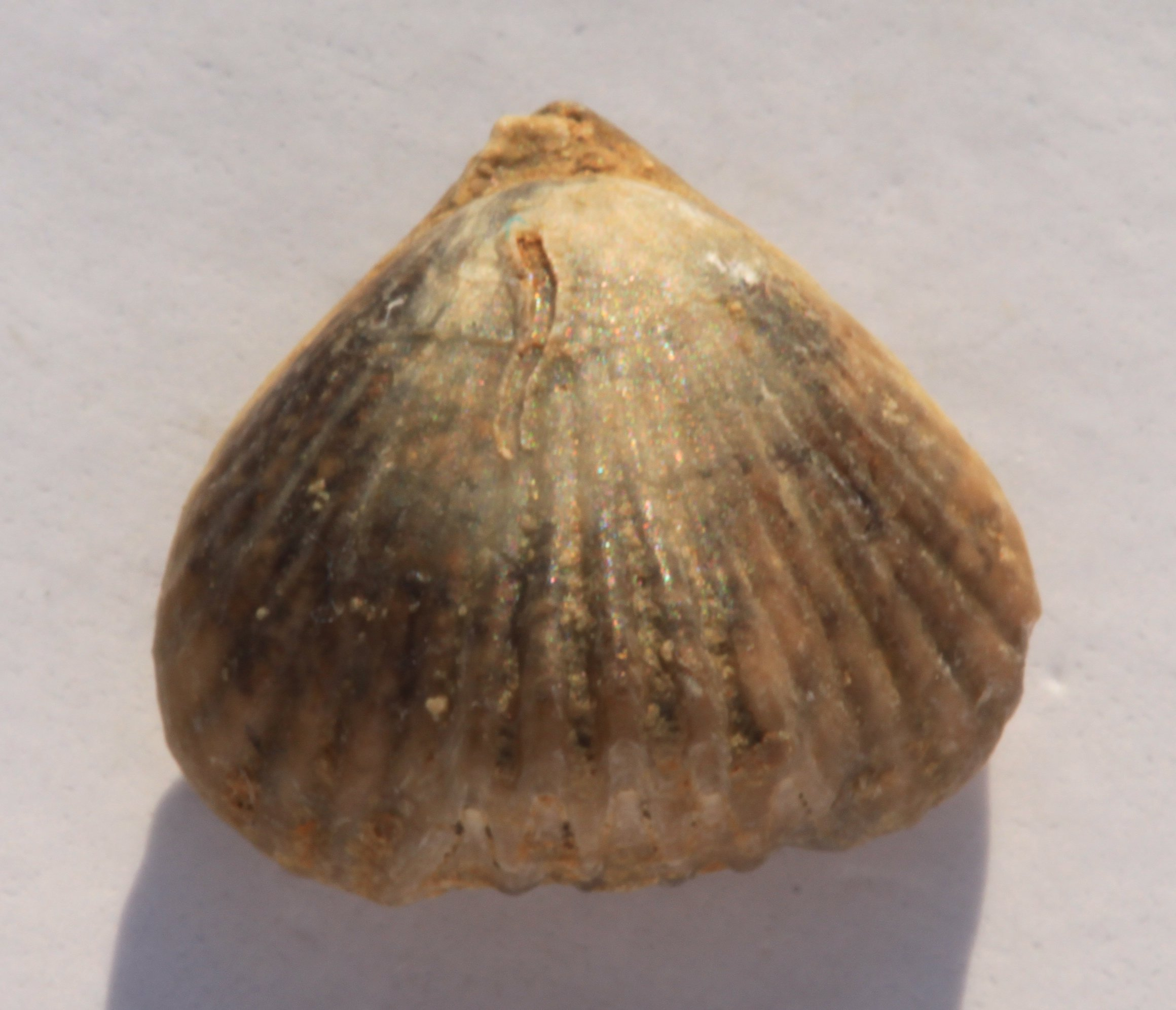
brachial valve

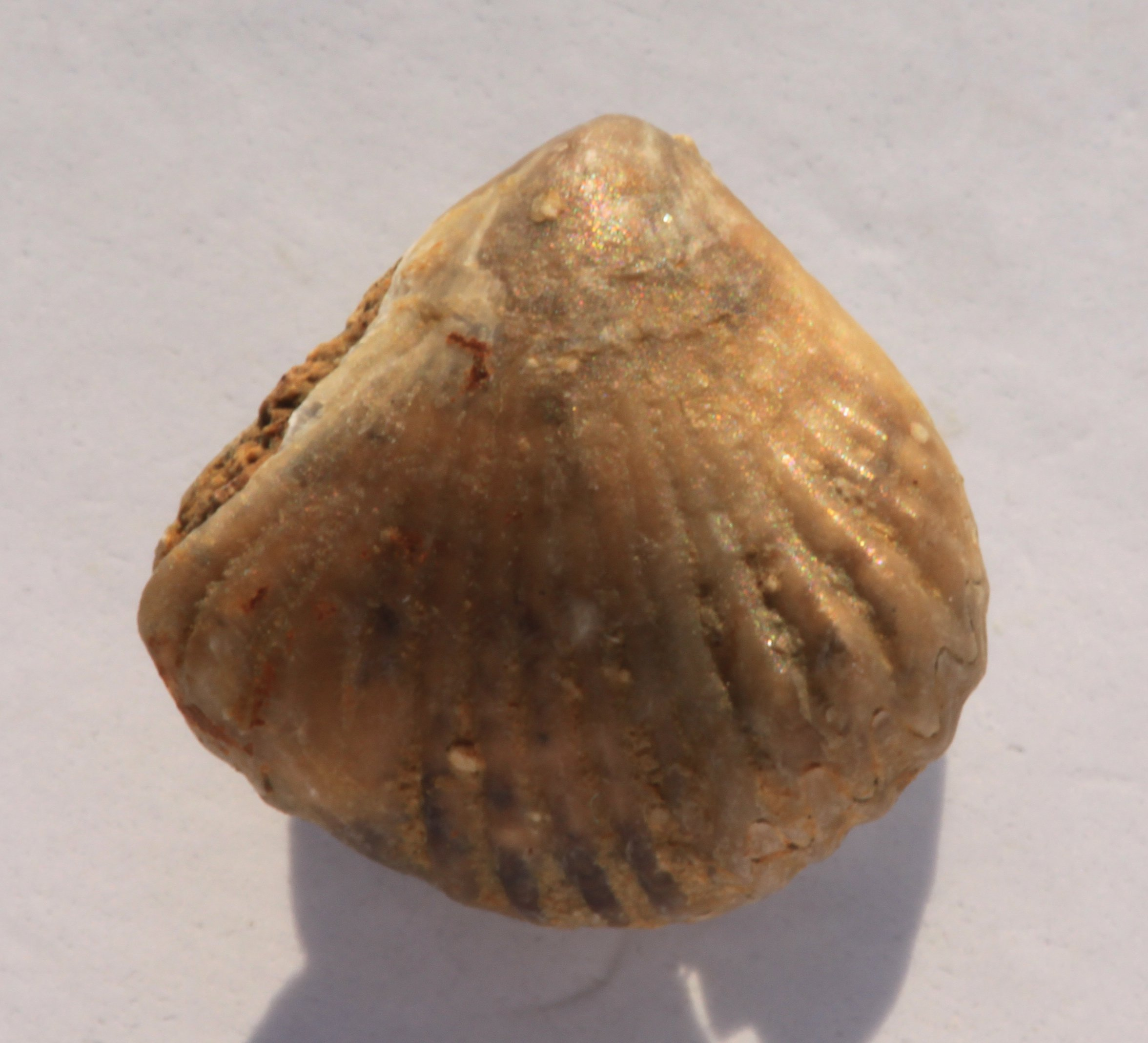
pedunculate valve

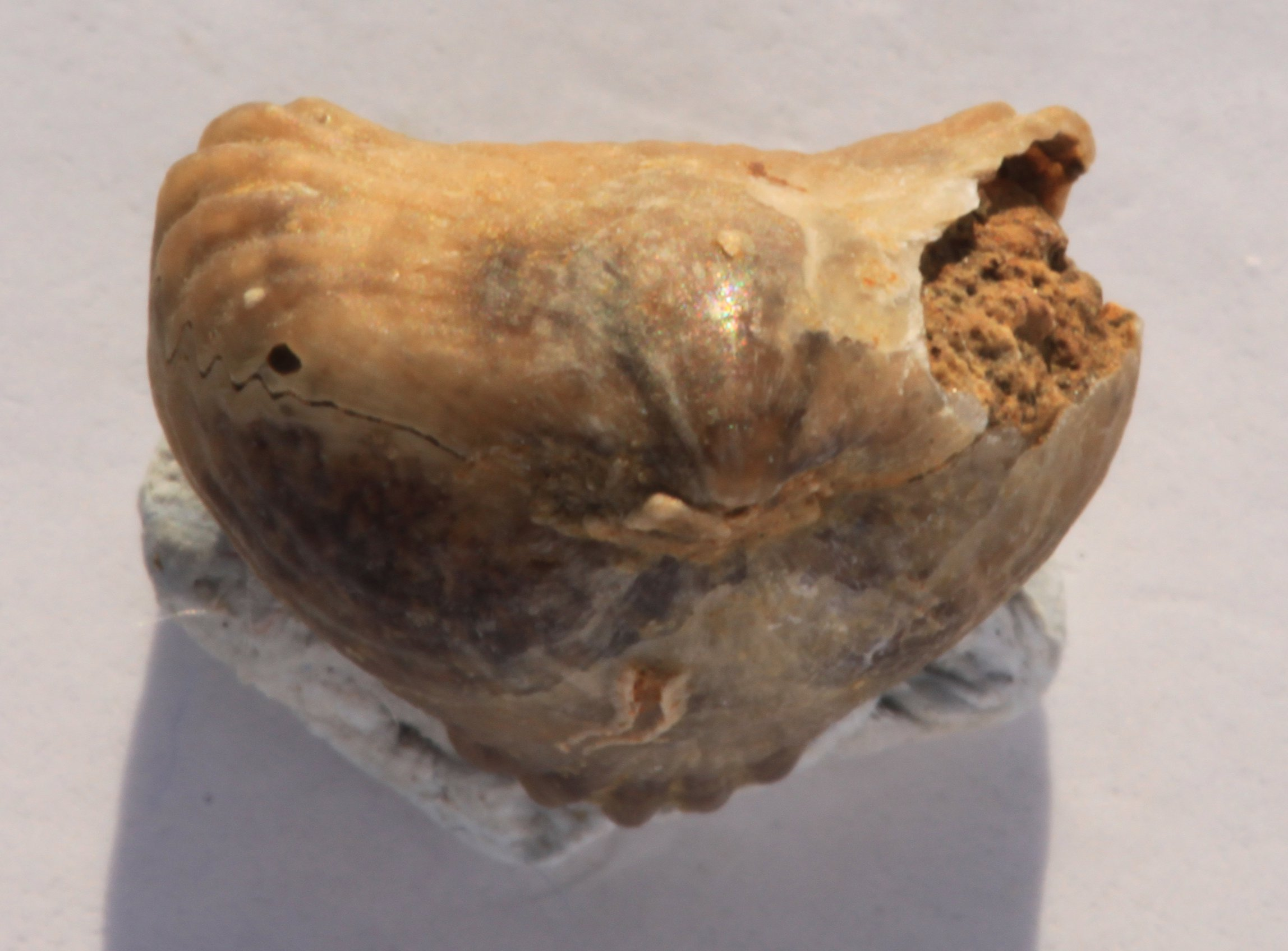
view of the hinge

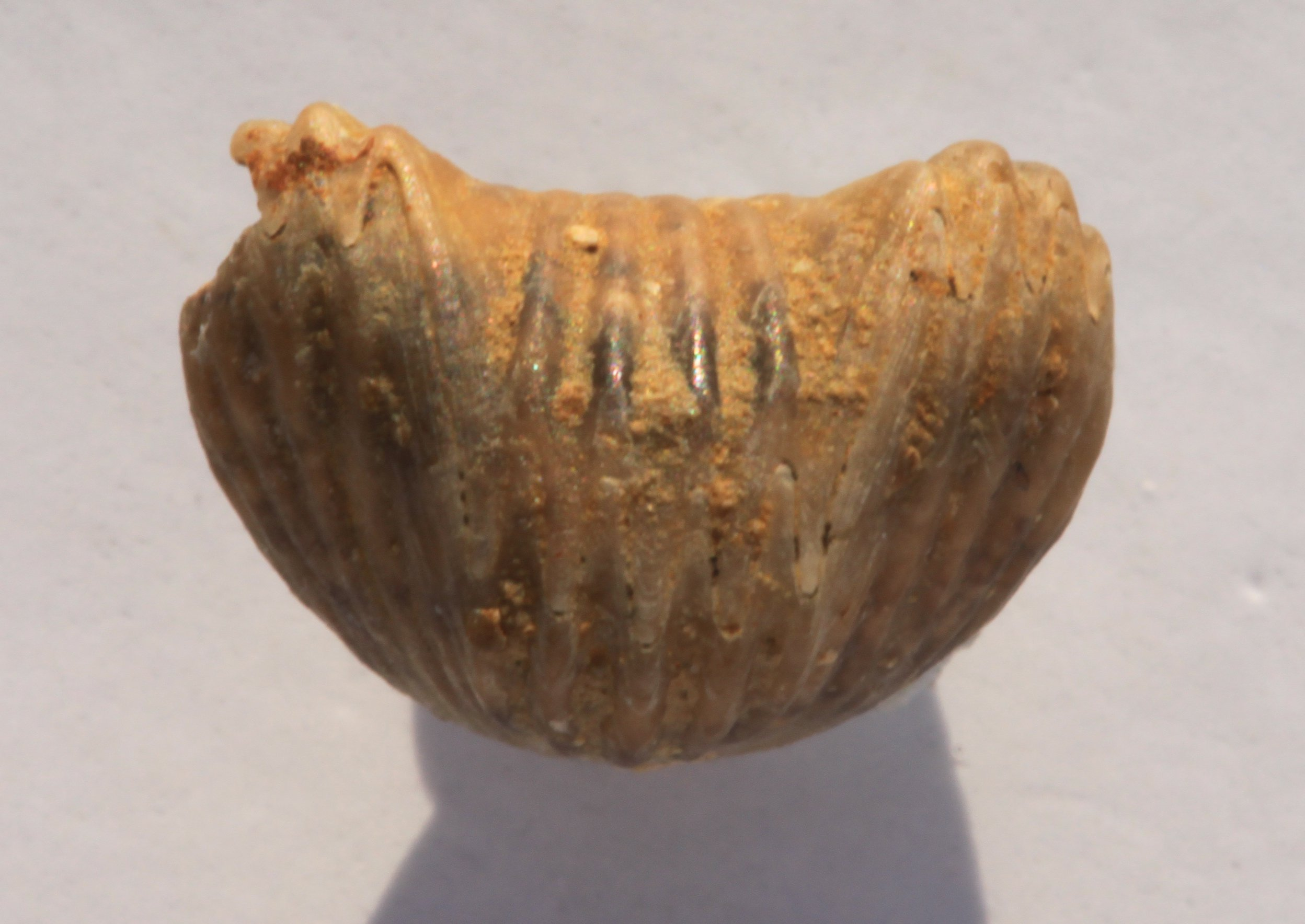
view of the opening

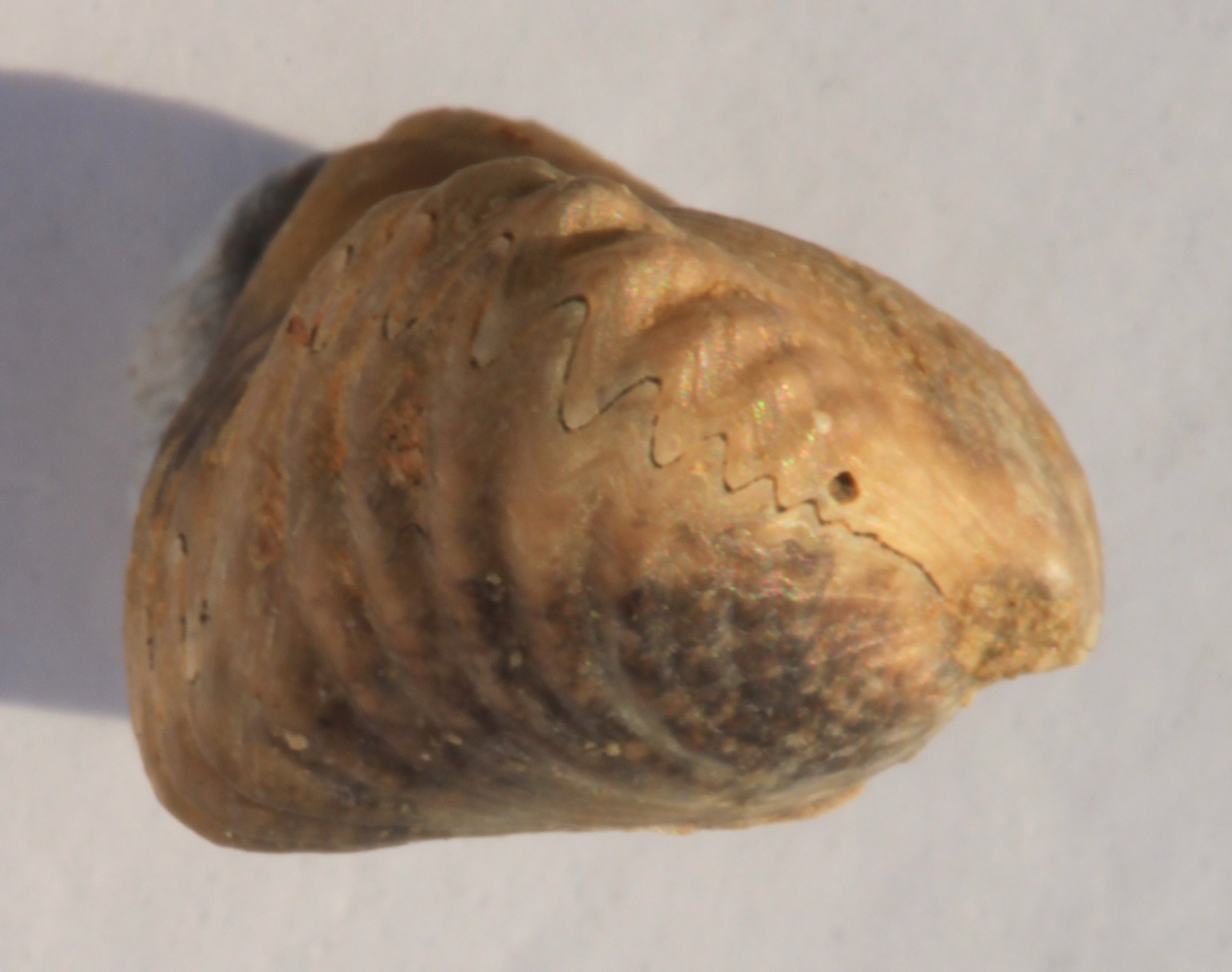
lateral view
