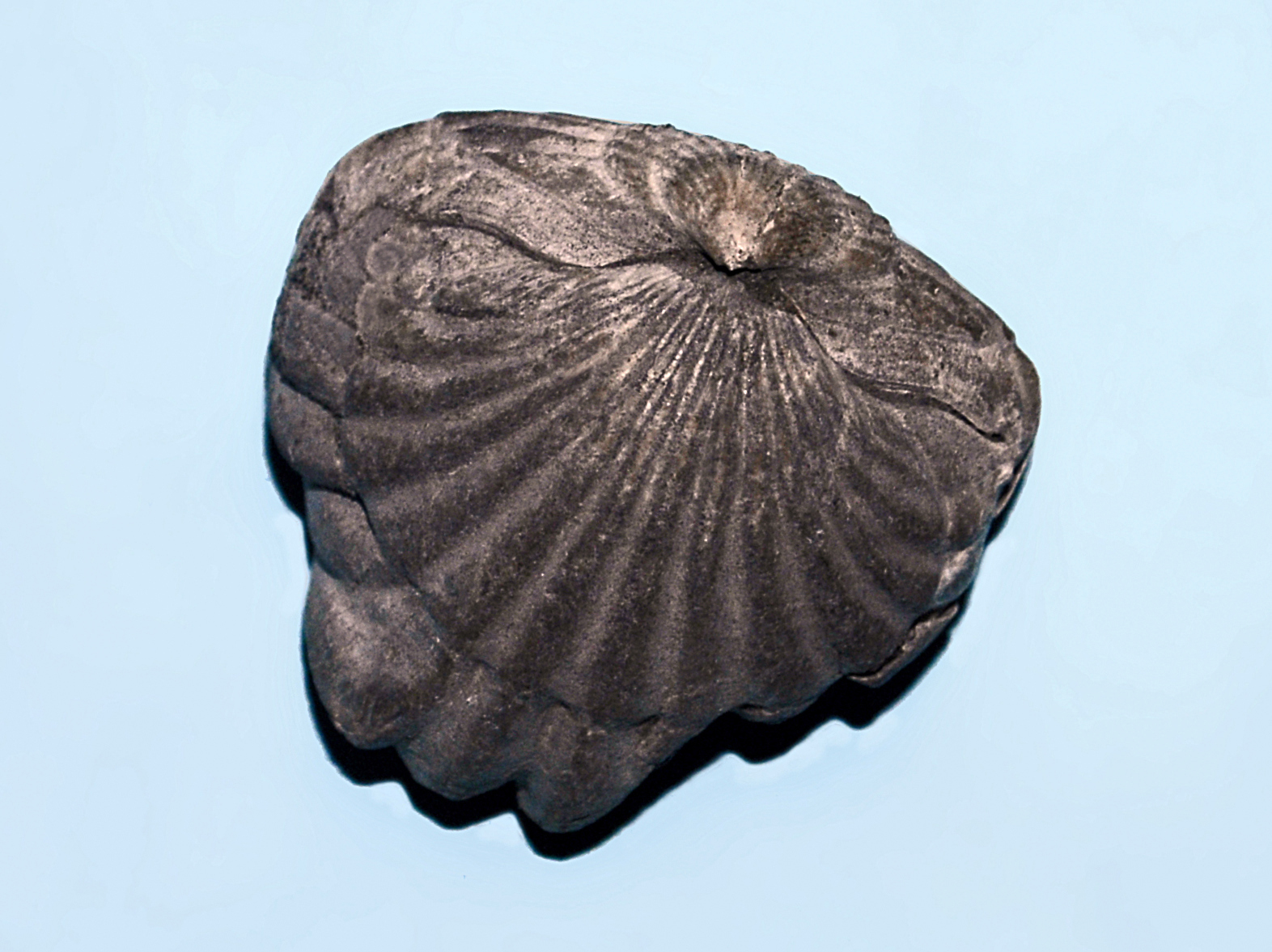
- Rhynchonella species from Russia

Scientific classification
- Kingdom: Animalia
- Phylum: Brachiopoda
- Class: Rhynchonellata
- Order: Rhynchonellida
- Family: †Rhynchonellidae
- Subfamily: †Rhynchonellinae
- Genus: †Rhynchonella; Fischer de Waldheim, 1809

= Rhynchonella =

Rhynchonella Temporal range: 466–37 Ma Ordovician – Eocene

Extinct genus of brachiopod

Rhynchonella is an extinct genus of brachiopods known from the Late Jurassic (Oxfordian) to the Early Cretaceous (Valanginian, possibly Barremian). Formerly this genus was understood much more widely (more or less an equivalent of the Rhynchonellida order in the present-day taxonomy) and less critical sources still list species of Rhynchonella from the Ordovician to the Eocene. Like most brachiopods, Rhynchonella was a stationary epifaunal suspension feeder.

== Description ==
These 1.75 to 3.75 cm-long articulate brachiopods are characterized by a triangular shell with a spherical profile, powerful ribs, a curved hinge line and a small umbo. The anterior margin shows a tongue like projection.

== Species ==
- Rhynchonella acuminata † Martin 1809
- Rhynchonella adrianensis † Gemmellaro 1899
- Rhynchonella boloniensis † (d'Orbigny, 1850)
- Rhynchonella carapezzae † Gemmellaro 1899
- Rhynchonella carinthiaca † Bittner 1890
- Rhynchonella confinensis † Schellwien 1892
- Rhynchonella djeffarae † Dubar 1967
- Rhynchonella edwardsi † Chapuis & Dewalque 1853
- Rhynchonella eskiordensis † Moisseiev 1932
- Rhynchonella fraasi † Oppel 1861
- Rhynchonella granulum † Eichwald 1860
- Rhynchonella inflata † Jaboli 1959
- Rhynchonella jukesi † McCoy 1847
- Rhynchonella kochigataniensis † Tokuyama 1957
- Rhynchonella krotovi † Tschemyschew 1902
- Rhynchonella lacuna † Quenstedt 1871
- Rhynchonella langleti † Chapuis & Dewalque 1853
- Rhynchonella limbata † Schlotheim 1813
- Rhynchonella lingulata † Gabb 1864
- Rhynchonella loxia † Fischer von Waldheim 1809
- Rhynchonella maudensis † Whiteaves 1884
- Rhynchonella minuta † Buvignier 1843
- Rhynchonella miquihuanensis † Imlay 1937
- Rhynchonella misella † Bittner 1890
- Rhynchonella negrii † Gemmellaro 1899
- Rhynchonella paolii † Canavari 1880
- Rhynchonella paucicosta † Kitchin 1910
- Rhynchonella pauciplicata † Kitchin 1900
- Rhynchonella prona † Oppel 1861
- Rhynchonella pseudoazaisi † Dubar 1967
- Rhynchonella pugnus † Martin
- Rhynchonella pupula † Bittner 1890
- Rhynchonella salinasi † Gemmellaro 1899
- Rhynchonella sosiensis † Gemmellaro 1899
- Rhynchonella subrimosa † Schafhauti 1851
- Rhynchonella tazerdunensis † Dubar 1967
- Rhynchonella texanus † Shumard 1859
- Rhynchonella wichmanni † Rothpletz 1892
- Rhynchonella withei † Gemmellaro 1899
