= Rhynchonella boloniensis =

Scientific classification
- Kingdom: Animalia
- Phylum: Brachiopoda
- Class: Rhynchonellata
- Order: Rhynchonellida
- Family: †Rhynchonellidae
- Genus: †Rhynchonella
- Species: †R. boloniensis

Binomial name
- †Rhynchonella boloniensis (d'Orbigny, 1850)

Extinct species of marine lamp shell

Rhynchonella boloniensis is an extinct species of brachiopod.
