= Eohemithiris =

Scientific classification
- Domain: Eukaryota
- Kingdom: Animalia
- Phylum: Brachiopoda
- Class: Rhynchonellata
- Order: Rhynchonellida
- Family: Basiliolidae
- Genus: Eohemithiris; Hertlein & Grant, 1944

Genus of brachiopods

Eohemithiris is a genus of brachiopods belonging to the family Basiliolidae.

The species of this genus are found in Northern America and Australia.

Species:

- Eohemithiris alexi Hertlein & Grant, 1944
- Eohemithiris grayi
- Eohemithyris gettysburgensis Cooper, 1959
- Eohemithyris miriaensis Craig, 1999
- Eohemithyris wildei Craig, 1999
- Rhynchonella grayi (Woodward, 1855)
