= Cryptopora =

Cryptopora may refer to:

- Cryptopora (brachiopod), a genus of brachiopods in the family Cryptoporidae
- Cryptopora, a fossil genus of bryozoans in the family Semicosciniidae, synonym of Semicoscinium
- Cryptopora, a genus of protists in the order Nassellaria, family unassigned, synonym of Cryptopera
