= Rhynchonella pugnus =

Scientific classification
- Kingdom: Animalia
- Phylum: Brachiopoda
- Class: Rhynchonellata
- Order: Rhynchonellida
- Family: †Rhynchonellidae
- Genus: †Rhynchonella
- Species: †R. pugnus

Binomial name
- †Rhynchonella pugnus

Extinct species of marine lamp shell

Rhynchonella pugnus is an extinct species of brachiopods, found in fossil beds from the Devonian and Carboniferous periods of the Paleozoic.
