= Abrekia =

Abrekia Temporal range: 252.3–242 Ma Triassic (Griesbachian – Bithynian)

Scientific classification
- Kingdom: Animalia
- Phylum: Brachiopoda
- Class: Rhynchonellata
- Order: Rhynchonellida
- Family: †Rhynchonellidae
- Genus: †Abrekia; Dagis, 1974

Genus of brachiopods

Abrekia is an extinct genus of brachiopods found in Early Triassic strata in Russia and China. It was a stationary epifaunal suspension feeder.
