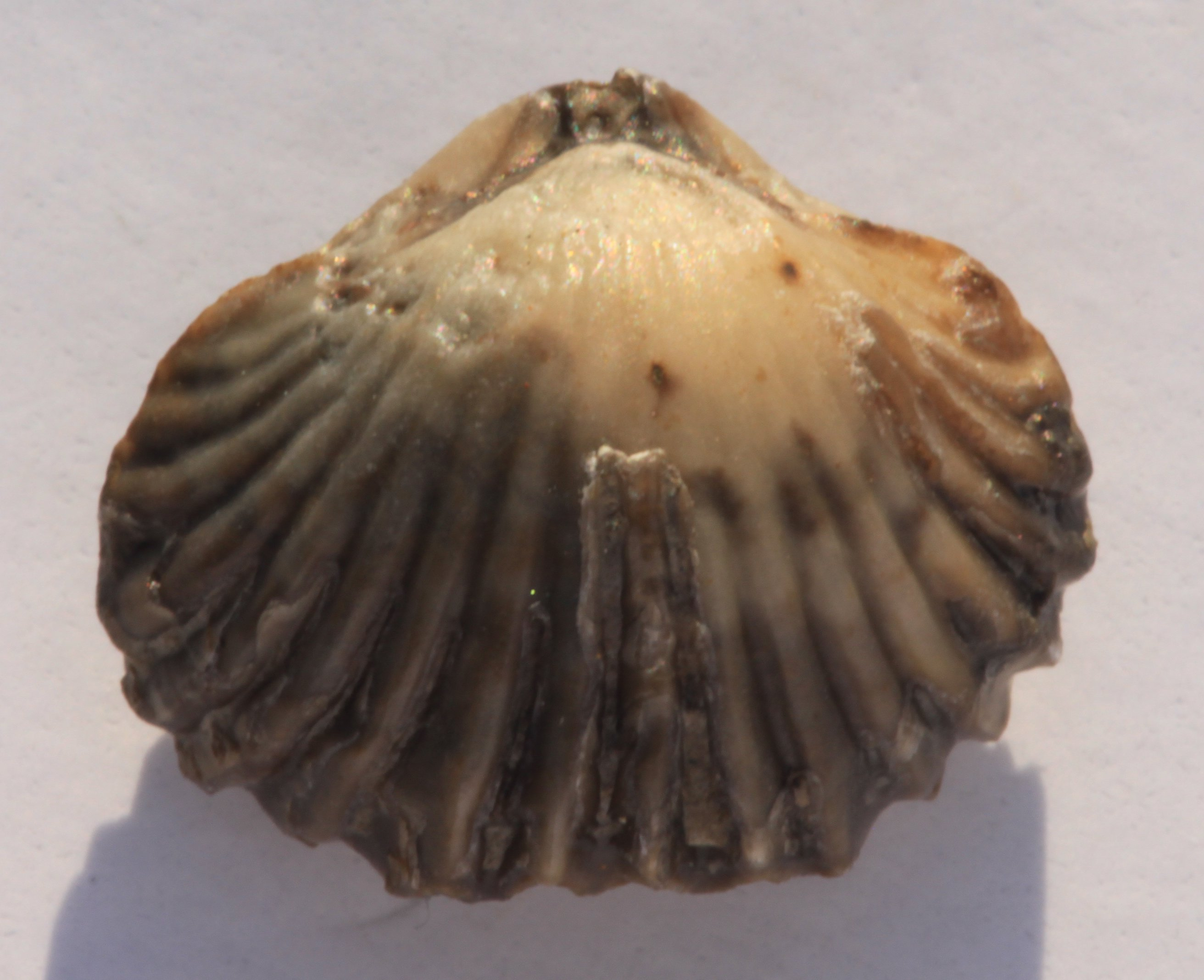
- Rhynchonelloidella smithi, brachial valve

Scientific classification
- Kingdom: Animalia
- Phylum: Brachiopoda
- Class: Rhynchonellata
- Order: Rhynchonellida
- Family: †Rhynchonellidae
- Genus: †Rhynchonelloidella
- Species: †R. smithi

Binomial name
- †Rhynchonelloidella smithi (Davidson, 1878)

Synonyms
- Rhynchonella varians (Schlotheim), in part; Rhynchonella varians var. smithi Walker MS; Rhynchonella smithi Walker; Rhynchonella media (Sowerby), in part; Rhynchonelloidella smithi var. crassa Muir-Wood

= Rhynchonelloidella smithi =

Rhynchonelloidella smithi Temporal range: Middle Jurassic, 168–165 Ma

Species of marine lamp shell

Rhynchonelloidella smithi is a species of extinct, small-sized brachiopods, a marine rhynchonellate lampshell in the family Rhynchonellidae. It is roughly 9/16 inch (1.4 cm), and has about 21 ribs fanning out from the hinge.

== Distribution ==
Rhynchonelloidella alemanica is known from the later Middle Jurassic (Bathonian) of England and Germany. The specimen that the description is based upon was collected in Fuller's Earth Rock, near Bath, Somerset, England (lectotype). Further specimens were collected from Weymouth, Bruton, Wiltshire, Gloucester, and Lamyat Beacon, Dyrham, Avon, Bristol Channel, Whatley, Somerset, and Sengenthal, Germany.

== Habitat ==
During the Middle c, the fossil locations cited were on continental shelves, probably in tropical, shallow coral seas, where this lampshell lived as a stationary epifaunal suspension feeder.

== Gallery ==
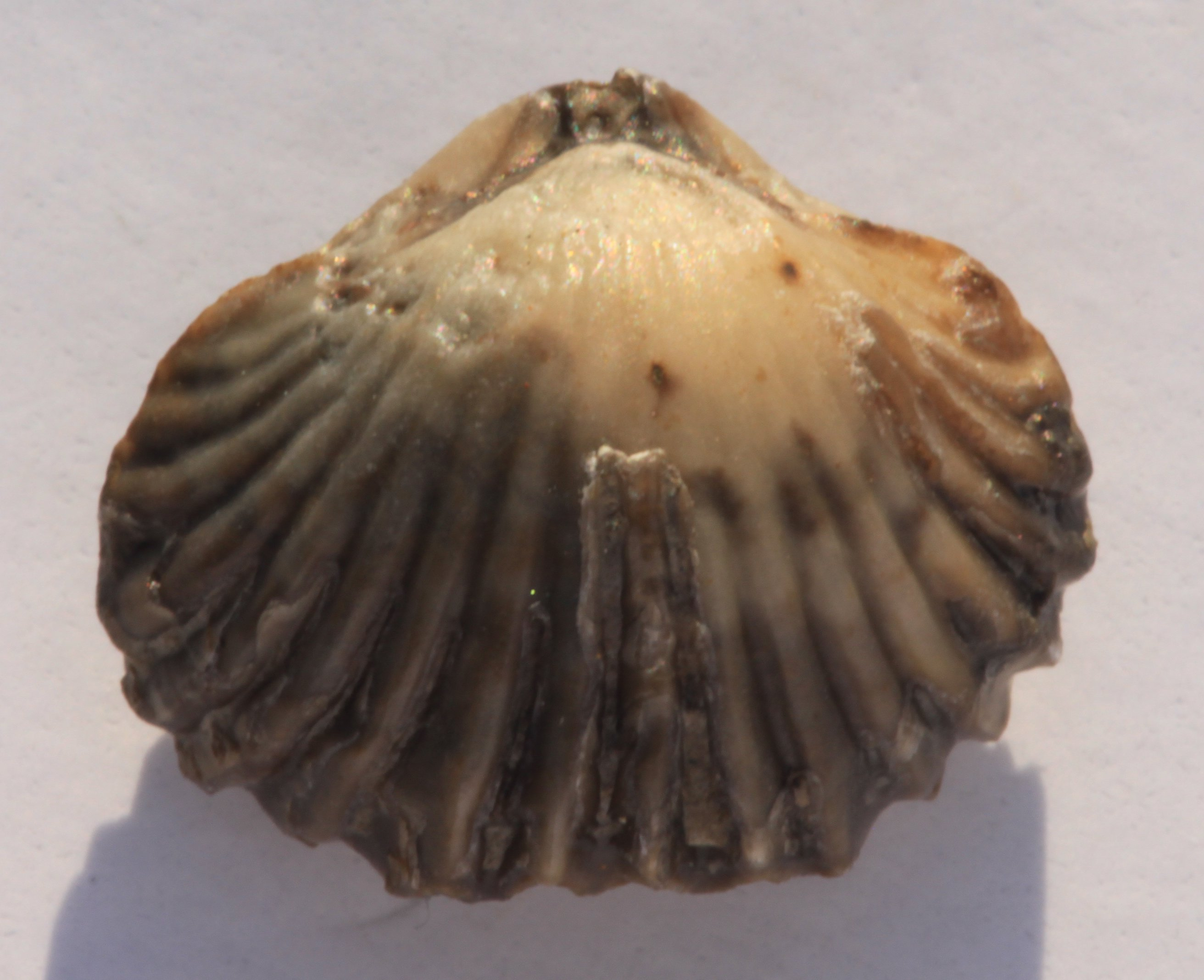
brachial valve

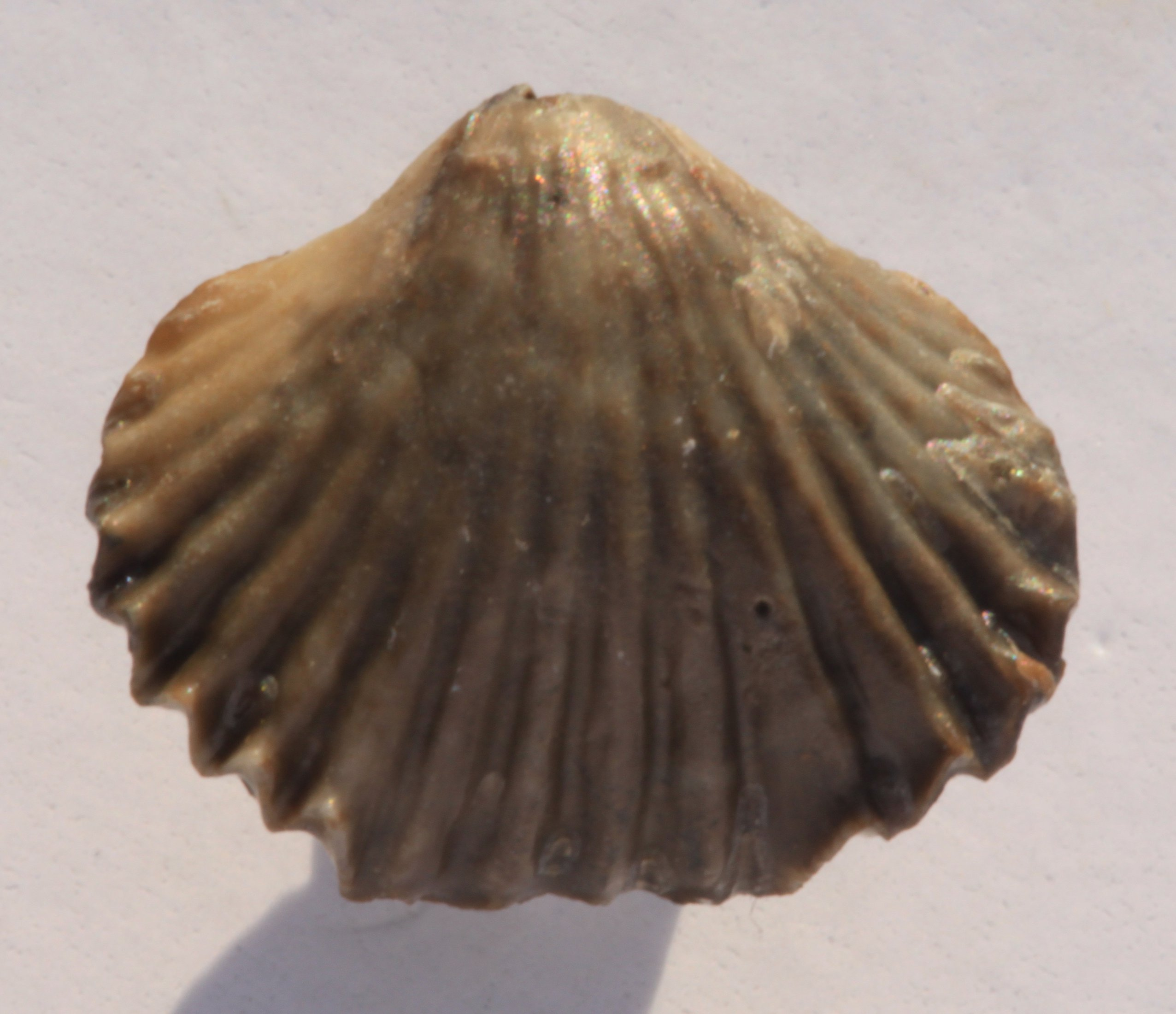
pedunculate valve

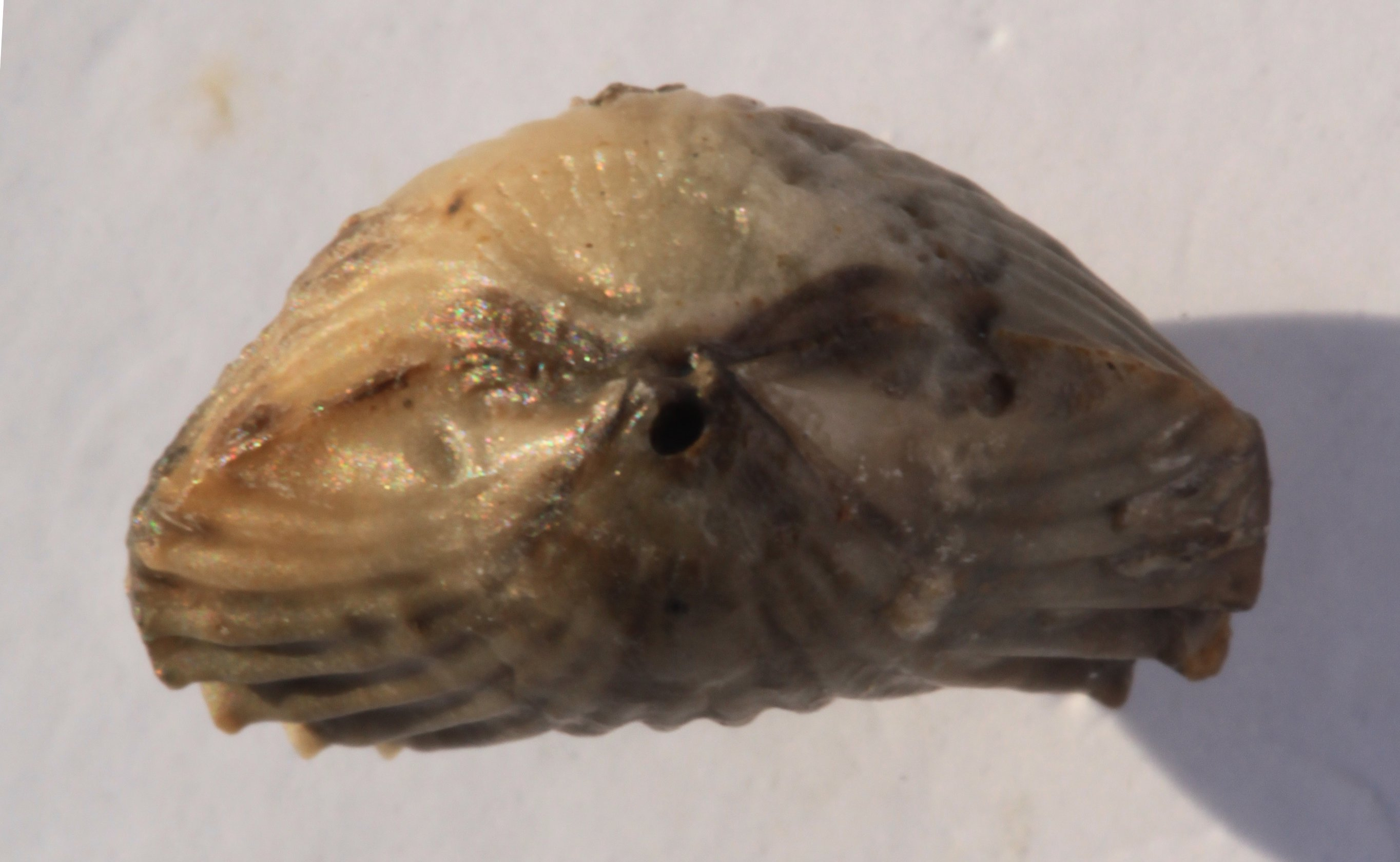
view of the hinge

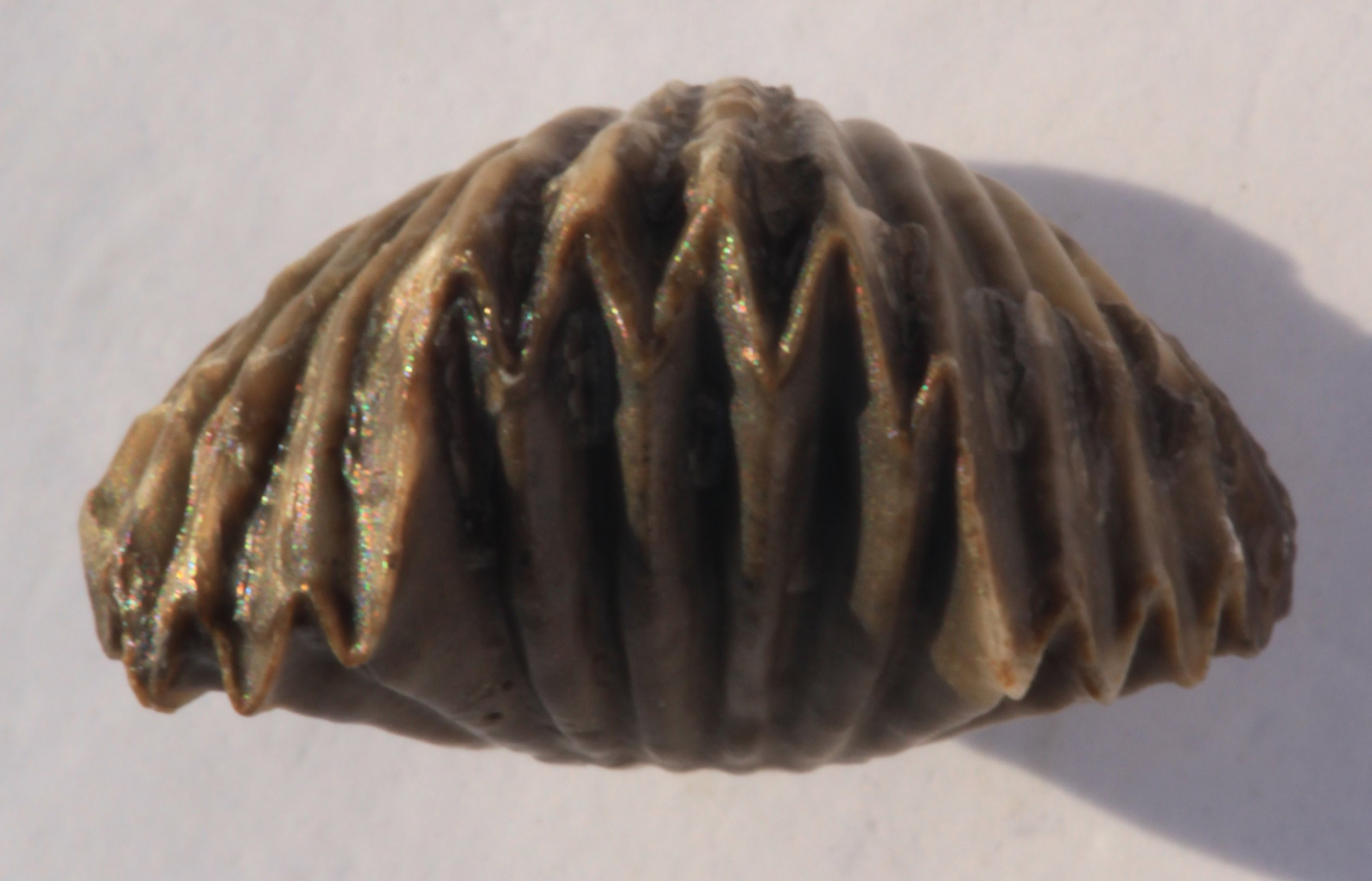
view of the opening

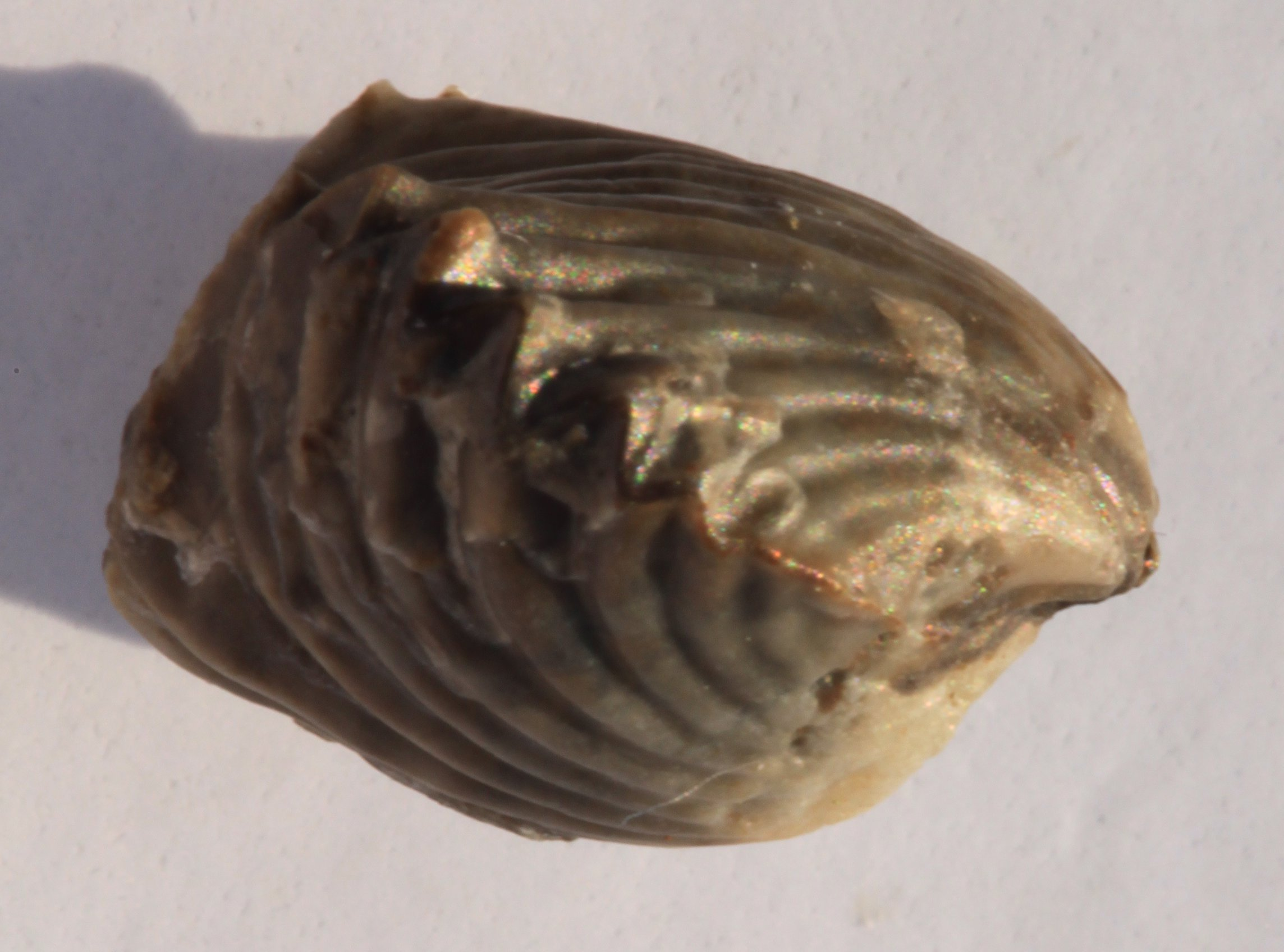
lateral view
