= Compsothyris =

Scientific classification
- Domain: Eukaryota
- Kingdom: Animalia
- Phylum: Brachiopoda
- Class: Rhynchonellata
- Order: Rhynchonellida
- Family: Frieleiidae
- Genus: Compsothyris; Jackson, 1918

Genus of brachiopods

Compsothyris is a genus of brachiopods belonging to the family Frieleiidae.

The species of this genus are found in southernmost South Hemisphere.

Species:

- Compsothyris ballenyi Foster, 1974
- Compsothyris racovitzae (Joubin, 1901)
