= Grammetaria =

Scientific classification
- Domain: Eukaryota
- Kingdom: Animalia
- Phylum: Brachiopoda
- Class: Rhynchonellata
- Order: Rhynchonellida
- Family: Frieleiidae
- Genus: Grammetaria

Genus of brachiopods

Grammetaria is a genus of brachiopods belonging to the family Frieleiidae.

The species of this genus are found in Malesia and New Zealand.

Species:

- Grammetaria africana Hiller, 1986
- Grammetaria bartschi (Dall, 1920)
- Grammetaria minima Zezina, 1994
