= Abyssorhynchia =

Abyssorhynchia Temporal range: Holocene

Scientific classification
- Kingdom: Animalia
- Phylum: Brachiopoda
- Class: Rhynchonellata
- Order: Rhynchonellida
- Family: Frieleiidae
- Subfamily: Hispanirhynchiinae
- Genus: Abyssorhynchia; Zezina, 1980

Species
- Abyssorhynchia craneana

Genus of marine lamp shells

Abyssorhynchia is an extant brachiopod genus found in the Pacific Ocean.
