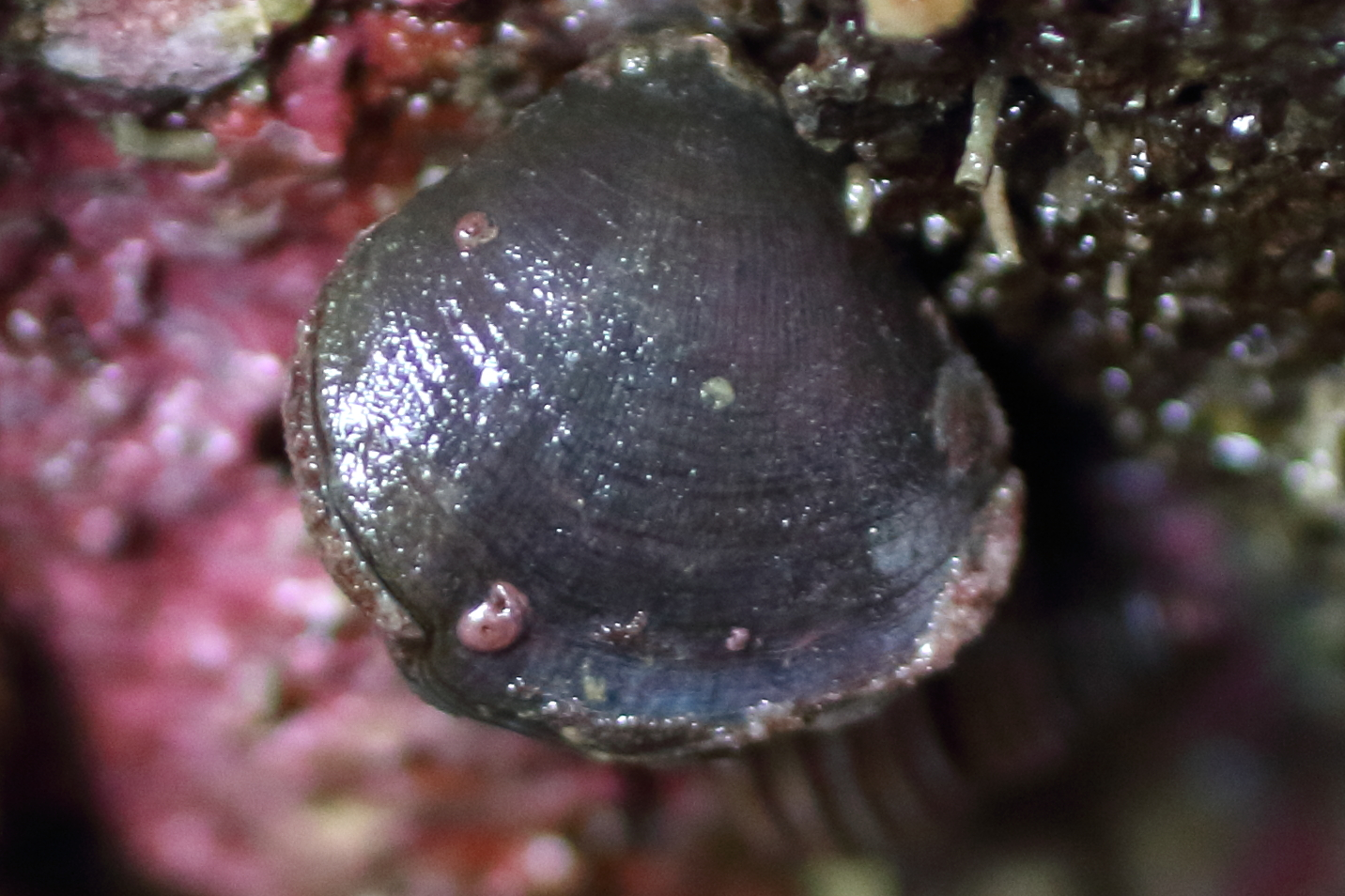
- Hemithiris psittacea

Scientific classification
- Domain: Eukaryota
- Kingdom: Animalia
- Phylum: Brachiopoda
- Class: Rhynchonellata
- Order: Rhynchonellida
- Family: Hemithirididae

= Hemithirididae =

Family of brachiopods

Hemithirididae is a family of brachiopods belonging to the order Rhynchonellida.

Genera:

- Hemithiris d'Orbigny, 1847
- †Patagorhynchia Allan, 1938
- Pemphixina Cooper, 1981
