= Thomas Davidson (palaeontologist) =

British palaeontologist (1817–1885)

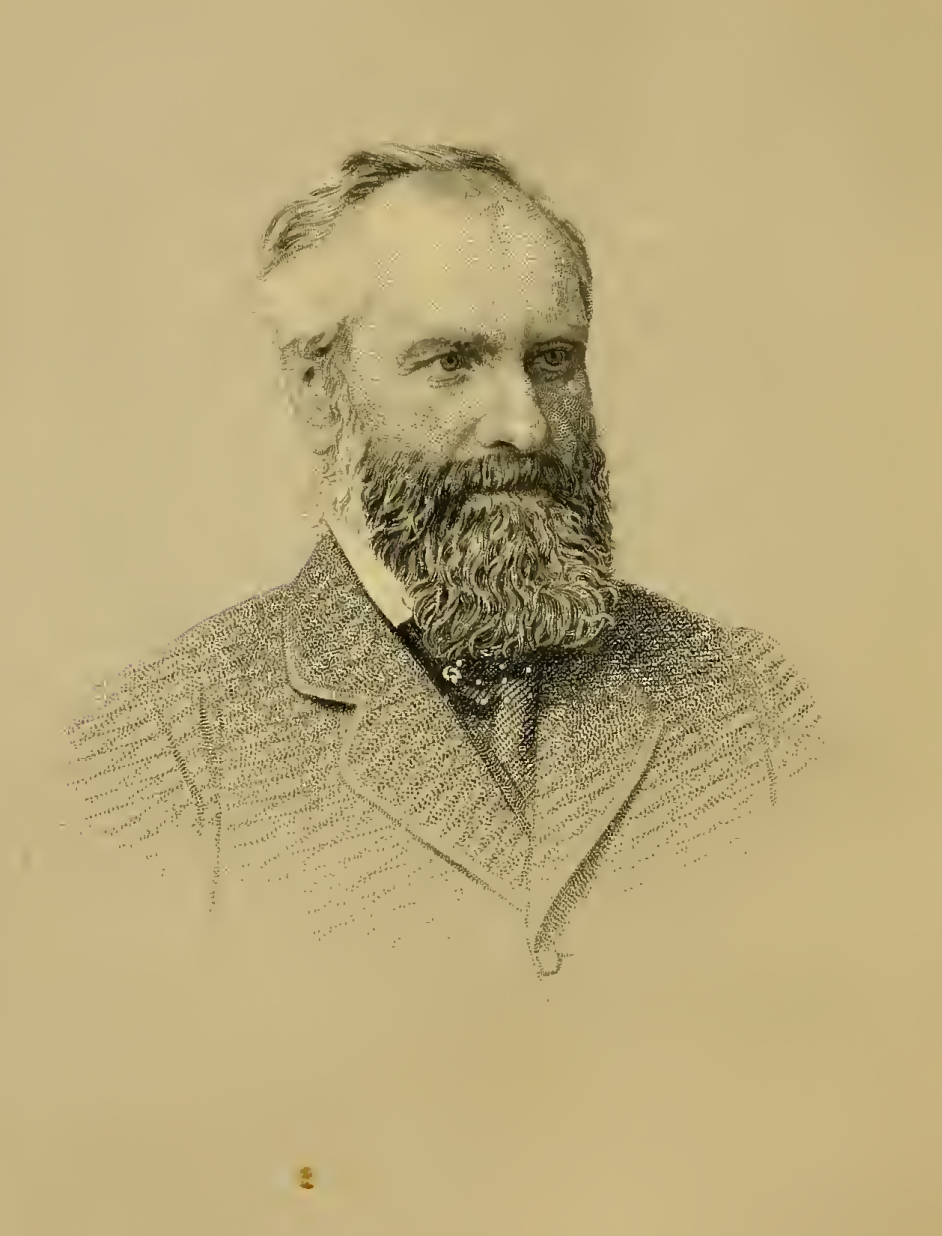
- Born: 17 May 1817; Edinburgh
- Died: 14 October 1885 (aged 68); Brighton
- Education: University of Edinburgh
- Known for: Studies on Brachiopoda
- Awards: Wollaston Medal (1865); Royal Medal (1870)
- Scientific career
- Fields: palaeontology

Thomas Davidson (17 May 1817 – 14 October 1885) was a British palaeontologist.

== Biography ==
He was born in Edinburgh. His parents possessed considerable landed property in Midlothian. Educated partly in the University of Edinburgh and partly in France, Italy and Switzerland, and early acquiring an interest in natural history, he benefited greatly by acquaintance with foreign languages and literature, and with men of science in different countries.

He was induced in 1837, through the influence of Leopold von Buch, to devote his special attention to the brachiopoda, and in course of time he became the highest authority on this group. The great task of his life was the Monograph of British Fossil Brachiopoda, published by the Palaeontographical Society (1850–1886). This work, with supplements, comprises six quarto volumes with more than 200 plates drawn on stone by the author. He also prepared an exhaustive memoir on Recent Brachiopoda, published by the Linnean Society. He monographed the entire series of Brachiopoda collected by HMS Challenger.

Davidson benefited from an introduction to Elizabeth Gray by John Young in 1865. Gray had a lifelong interest in the fossils of Girvan in Scotland. Her family took their holidays there each year and they would devote their time to gathering cleaning and labelling fossils. Gray had some basic geology training, but she preferred to let others do the scientific descriptions. Gray would send collections of fossils, including brachiopoda, regularly over several years between 1867 and 1885. Davidson also worked closely with British paleontologist Agnes Crane, who completed the editing work on Davidson's final, posthumous, Monograph of Recent Brachiopoda.

He was elected fellow of the Geological Society of London in 1852 and in 1865 awarded their Wollaston medal. He was elected Fellow of the Royal Society in 1857, and in 1870 received a Royal medal from the Royal Society. In 1882, the degree of LL.D. was conferred upon him by the University of St Andrews. In 1866, he was elected as a member to the American Philosophical Society.

Davidson died at Brighton on 14 October 1885, bequeathing his fine collection of recent and fossil brachiopoda to the British Museum. He was buried in the churchyard of St Peter's Church, Twineham. (His son, William Davidson, had inherited Hickstead Place and the Manor of Twineham through his wife, the daughter of John Wood, of Hickstead Place.)

== Monograph of British Fossil Brachiopoda ==
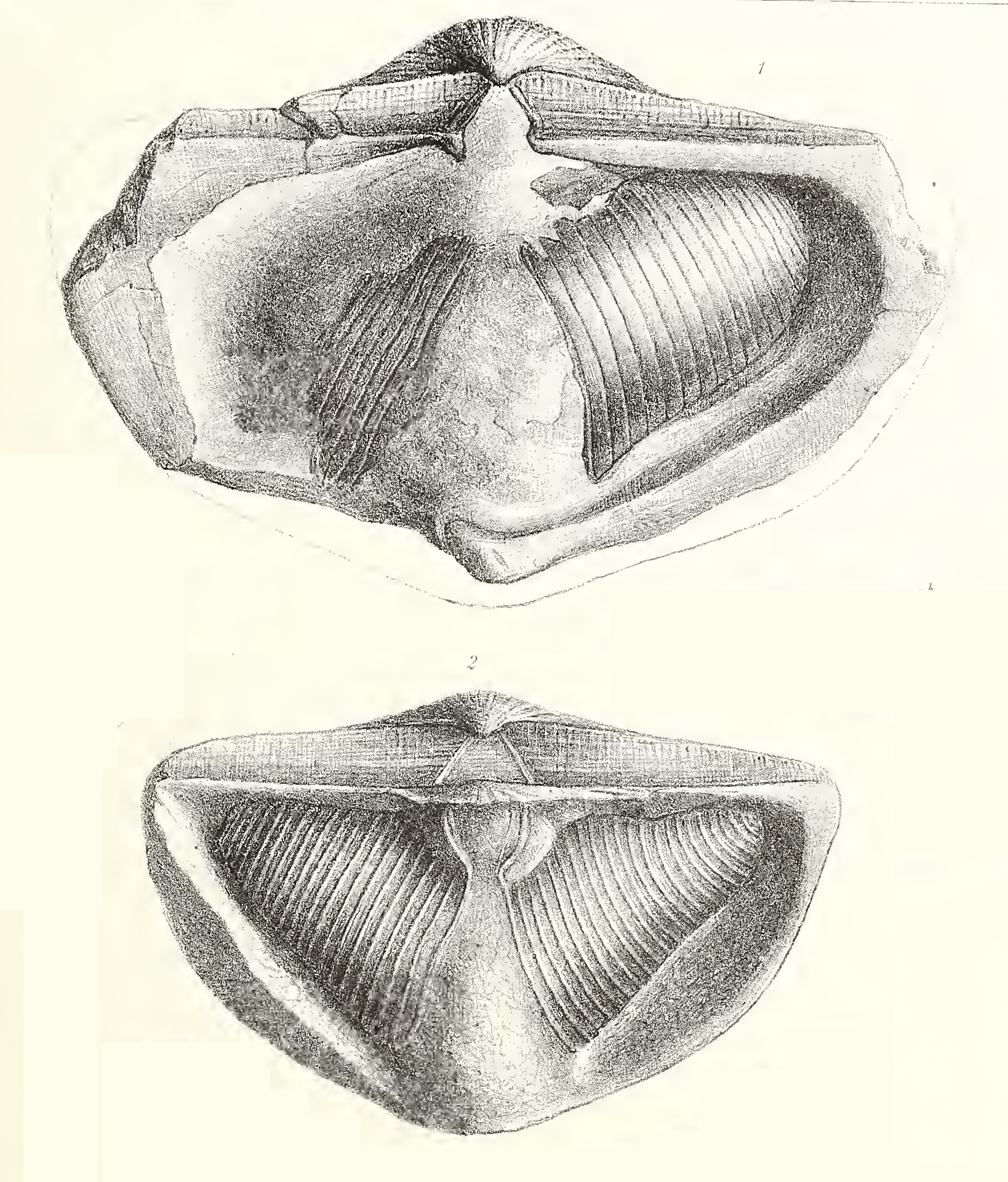
Two specimens of Spirifer striatus, showing the spiral coils. From Monograph of British Fossil Brachiopoda Vol. 4 Part 3, Plate 31.

This was published in multiple parts in the series Monographs of the Palaeontographical Society in Volumes IV to XXXIX, not always in sequence. Volume numbers within the brachiopod monograph are shown below with arabic numerals, e.g. Vol. 4, while volume numbers of the series are shown with roman numerals, e.g. Volume IV.
Vol. 1. The Tertiary, Cretaceous, Oolitic and Liassic Brachiopods

- Introduction to Vol. 1, Volume VII, 1853
- Part 1, Tertiary, Volume VI, 1852
- Part 2, No 1, Cretaceous, Volume VI, 1852
- Part 2, No 2, Cretaceous, with Appendix and Index to Vol. 1, Volume VIII, 1854
- Part 3, No 1, Oolitic and Liassic, Volume IV, 1850
- Part 3, No 2, Oolitic and Liassic, Volume VI, 1852

Vol. 2. The Permian and Carboniferous Brachiopods

- Part 4, Permian, Volume X, 1856
- Part 5, No 1, Carboniferous, Volume X, 1856
- Part 5, No 2, Carboniferous, Volume XI, 1857
- Part 5, No 3, Carboniferous, Volume XII, 1858
- Part 5, No 4, Carboniferous, Volume XIII, 1859
- Part 5, No 5, Carboniferous, Volume XIV, 1860

Vol. 3. The Devonian and Silurian Brachiopods

- Part 6, No 1, Devonian, Volume XVI, 1862
- Part 6, No 2, Devonian, Volume XVII, 1863
- Part 7, No 1, Silurian, Volume XIX, 1865
- Part 7, No 2, Silurian, Volume XX, 1866
- Part 7, No 3, Silurian, Volume XXII, 1868
- Part 7, No 4, Silurian, Volume XXIV, 1870

Vol. 4. Supplements Tertiary to Carboniferous

- Part 1 (Tertiary and Cretaceous), Volume XXVII, 1873
- Part 2, No 1 (Jurassic and Triassic), Volume XXX, 1876
- Part 2, No 2 (Jurassic and Triassic), Volume XXXII, 1878
- Part 3 (Permian and Carboniferous), Volume XXXIV, 1880
- Part 4 (Devonian and Silurian, from Budleigh Salterton pebble beds), Volume XXXV, 1881
- Part 5 (Conclusion), Volume XXXVI, 1882

Vol. 5. Supplements, Devonian and Silurian

- Part 1 (Devonian and Silurian), Volume XXXVI, 1882
- Part 2 (Silurian), Volume XXXVII, 1883
- Part 3 (Conclusion), Volume XXXVIII, 1884

Vol. 6. Bibliography

- Volume XXXIX 1885

== Other publications ==
- Davidson, Thomas (1854). "Observations on the Chonetes comoides (Sowerby)". Quarterly Journal of the Geological Society. 10 (1–2): 202–207. Bibcode:1854QJGS...10..202D. doi:10.1144/GSL.JGS.1854.010.01-02.15. S2CID 130533051.
- —— (1862). "On some Carboniferous Brachiopoda collected in India by A. Fleming, MD, and W. Purdon, Esq., FGS". Quarterly Journal of the Geological Society. 18 (1–2): 25–35. Bibcode:1862QJGS...18...25D. doi:10.1144/GSL.JGS.1862.018.01-02.14. S2CID 140666108.
- —— (1863). "On the Lower Carboniferous Brachiopoda of Nova Scotia". Quarterly Journal of the Geological Society. 19 (1–2): 158–175. Bibcode:1863QJGS...19..158D. doi:10.1144/GSL.JGS.1863.019.01-02.21. S2CID 129380318.
- —— (1864). "On the Recent and Tertiary Species of the Genus Thecidium". Geological Magazine. 1 (1): 12–22. Bibcode:1864GeoM....1...12D. doi:10.1017/S0016756800469803. S2CID 131306922.
- —— (1864). "Outline of the geology of the Maltese Islands, by Dr. Leith Adams, of the 22nd Regiment; and descriptions of the Brachiopoda". Annals and Magazine of Natural History. 14 (79): 1–11. doi:10.1080/00222936408681650.
- —— (1877). "What is a Brachiopod?". Geological Magazine. 4 (4): 145–155. Bibcode:1877GeoM....4..145D. doi:10.1017/S0016756800148927. S2CID 133771716.
- —— (1881). "On genera and species of spiral-bearing Brachiopoda, from specimens developed by the Rev. Norman Glass: with notes on the results obtained by Mr. George Maw from extensive washings of the Wenlock and Ludlow shales of Shropshire". Geological Magazine. 8 (1): 1–13. Bibcode:1881GeoM....8....1D. doi:10.1017/S0016756800112993. S2CID 140633706.
- —— (1886–1888). "A Monograph of Recent Brachiopoda". Transactions of the Linnean Society of London. 2nd Series: Zoology. 4: 1–73, 75–182, 183–248. doi:10.1111/j.1096-3642.1886.tb00655.x.
