= Agnes Crane =

British paleontologist (1852–1932)

- Born: June 1852; Thorney, Cambridgeshire
- Died: September 1932 (aged 80); Brighton, Sussex
- Known for: Studies of the Brachiopoda

Agnes Crane (June 1852 – September 1932) was an English paleontologist, who published a number of articles on fossil and recent brachiopods, described a new brachiopod species, and presented her work internationally.

== Early life ==
Agnes Crane was born in June 1852 in Thorney, near Peterborough, Cambridgeshire. She was the only child of Edward Crane and Jane Turnell. Crane lived in Thorney until 1866, when her father retired. They settled in Brighton in 1867, after travelling around Europe. Crane lived in Brighton for the rest of her life.

Edward Crane was elected a Fellow of the Geological Society of London in 1872, and became involved with the Brighton Museum in the 1870s, first assisting with the geological gallery, and later as a member and then chair of the museum committee.

== Writings on paleontology ==
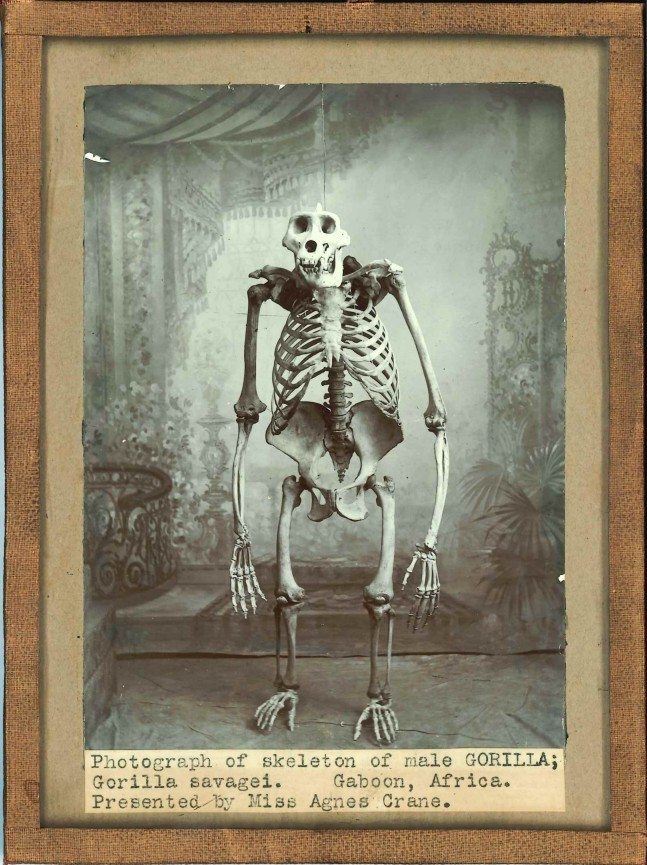
Photograph of a gorilla skeleton taken against a Victorian photography studio backdrop of plants and draperies, captioned as presented by Miss Agnes Crane

From the late 1870s, Crane had a deep interest in recent and fossil organisms, and wrote a number of journal articles on fish, cephalopods and brachiopods. She had no formal university training, but corresponded with leading zoologists and paleontologists of the day, such as Albert Günther at the Natural History Museum, London, and presented her work or, had her work presented, to local scientific meetings, including the Brighton and Sussex Natural History Society. In Brighton, Crane was able to work with Scottish paleontologist, and brachiopod specialist, Thomas Davidson. Davidson lived in Brighton for many years, and in the 1870s was chairman of the Brighton museum committee, a role later taken on by Crane's father.

After Davidson died, in 1885, Crane was invited by the Linnean Society to oversee the editing and final production of Davidson's monograph of recent brachiopods. Within the collections left by Davidson, Crane came across some samples of brachiopods that had recently been dredged from shallow waters offshore from Port Stephens, New South Wales by Australian malacologist John Brazier. Davidson had labelled the samples Atretia brazeri, in honour of the collector, but had not completed any formal description of the material. Crane examined and described the samples, and published the first technical description of this new species in a paper in April 1886. Subsequent work has shown that this species is part of a genus of brachiopods, Aulites, that are only found in Australian waters.

In subsequent years, Crane wrote a number of book chapters, essays and technical papers on brachiopod anatomy and evolution.

In addition to her writings on paleontology, Crane wrote more widely on topics including sea-level change and ancient Mexican heraldry; she also wrote a number of book reviews for scientific journals and contributed to discussions of papers on other topics.

== Travel ==
Crane was well travelled and, among other things, published a serialised account of a trip to the United States with her father in 1881 in The Leisure Hour, with notes on her visits to a number of museums and collections. In August 1893, Crane was one of twelve women who presented papers at the Women's Auxiliary Branch of the World's Congress in Chicago.

Crane died in September 1932, in Brighton. Her collections of brachiopods are now held by the Booth Museum of Natural History.

== Published works ==
=== Paleontology and natural history ===
- Crane A. (1877) "On Certain Genera of Living Fishes and their Fossil Affinities". Geological Magazine, 4, 209–219.
- Crane A. (1878) "The General History of the Cephalopoda, Recent and Fossil". Geological Magazine, 5, 487–499.
- Crane, A. (1881) "Article on the Molluscoida (Brachiopoda and Bryozoa)". Cassell's Nat. Hist. vol. v. parts 56–57, 258–280.
- Crane, A. (1886) "On a Brachiopod of the genus Atretia" (A. Brazieri, Dav. MS.). Proceedings of the Zoological Society, London, p. 181.
- Crane, A. (1886–1888) Edition of Thomas Davidson's Posthumous Monograph of the Recent Brachiopoda. Transactions of the Linnæan Society, London, vol. iv. Zool. Three Parts.
- Crane A. (1893) "New Classifications of the Brachiopoda". Geological Magazine, 10, 318–323.
- Crane A. (1895) "The Evolution of the Brachiopoda". Geological Magazine, 2, 65–75, 103–116.

=== Other topics ===
- Crane, Agnes (1892) "Ancient Mexican Heraldry", Science, 20, No. 503, 174–176.
- Crane, Agnes (1893) "Coyote or Bear?", Science, 22, No. 552, pp. 124–125.
- Crane, Agnes (1895) "The Submergence of Western Europe Prior to the Neolithic Period", Science, New Series, 2, No. 27, 2–4.
