= Cryptoporidae =

Scientific classification
- Domain: Eukaryota
- Kingdom: Animalia
- Phylum: Brachiopoda
- Class: Rhynchonellata
- Order: Rhynchonellida
- Family: Cryptoporidae

Family of brachiopods

Cryptoporidae is a family of brachiopods belonging to the order Rhynchonellida.

Genera:

- Aulites Richardson, 1987
- Cryptopora Jeffreys, 1869
- †Cryptoporella Bitner & Pisera, 1979
