= Aulites =

Scientific classification
- Domain: Eukaryota
- Kingdom: Animalia
- Phylum: Brachiopoda
- Class: Rhynchonellata
- Order: Rhynchonellida
- Family: Cryptoporidae
- Genus: Aulites; Richardson, 1987

Genus of brachiopods

Aulites is a genus of brachiopods belonging to the family Cryptoporidae.

The species of this genus are found in Australia, and were first described by Agnes Crane.

Species:

- Aulites brazieri (Crane, 1886)
- Aulites crosnieri Bitner, 2009
