= Frieleiidae =

Scientific classification
- Kingdom: Animalia
- Phylum: Brachiopoda
- Class: Rhynchonellata
- Order: Rhynchonellida
- Superfamily: Norelloidea
- Family: Frieleiidae; Cooper, 1959

Family of brachiopods

Frieleiidae is a family of brachiopods belonging to the order Rhynchonellida.

== Genera ==
Genera:

- Abyssorhynchia Zezina, 1980
- Compsothyris Jackson, 1918
- Frieleia Dall, 1895
- Grammetaria Cooper, 1959
- Hispanirhynchia Thomson, 1927
- Hispanirhyncha
- Manithyris Foster, 1974
- Neorhynchia Thomson, 1915
- Parasphenarina Motchurova-Dekova, Saito & Endo, 2002
- Sphenarina Cooper, 1959
