= Frieleia =

Scientific classification
- Domain: Eukaryota
- Kingdom: Animalia
- Phylum: Brachiopoda
- Class: Rhynchonellata
- Order: Rhynchonellida
- Family: Frieleiidae
- Genus: Frieleia; Dall, 1895

Genus of brachiopods

Frieleia is a genus of brachiopods belonging to the family Frieleiidae.

The species of this genus are found in Northern America.

Species:

- Frieleia halli Dall, 1895
- Frieleia pellucida (Yabe & Hatai, 1934)
