= Hispanirhynchia =

Scientific classification
- Domain: Eukaryota
- Kingdom: Animalia
- Phylum: Brachiopoda
- Class: Rhynchonellata
- Order: Rhynchonellida
- Family: Frieleiidae
- Genus: Hispanirhynchia; Thomson, 1927
- Species: H. cornea

Binomial name
- Hispanirhynchia cornea (Fischer, 1886)

Genus of brachiopods

Hispanirhynchia is a monotypic genus of brachiopods belonging to the family Frieleiidae. The only species is Hispanirhynchia cornea.
