= Notosaria =

Scientific classification
- Kingdom: Animalia
- Phylum: Brachiopoda
- Class: Rhynchonellata
- Order: Rhynchonellida
- Family: Notosariidae
- Genus: Notosaria; Cooper, 1959

Genus of brachiopods

Notosaria is a genus of brachiopods belonging to the family Notosariidae.

== Species ==
The species of this genus are found in New Zealand.

Species:

- Notosaria nigricans (Sowerby, 1846)
- Notosaria reinga Lee & Wilson, 1979
- Notosaria seymourensis Owen, 1980

== Description ==
The shell of N. nigricans had six layers. These were the mucopolysaccharide, the outer fibrillar triple-layered membrane, the mucoprotein, the inner fibrillar triple-layered membrane, the calcareous primary layer, and the calcareous-organic secondary layer.
