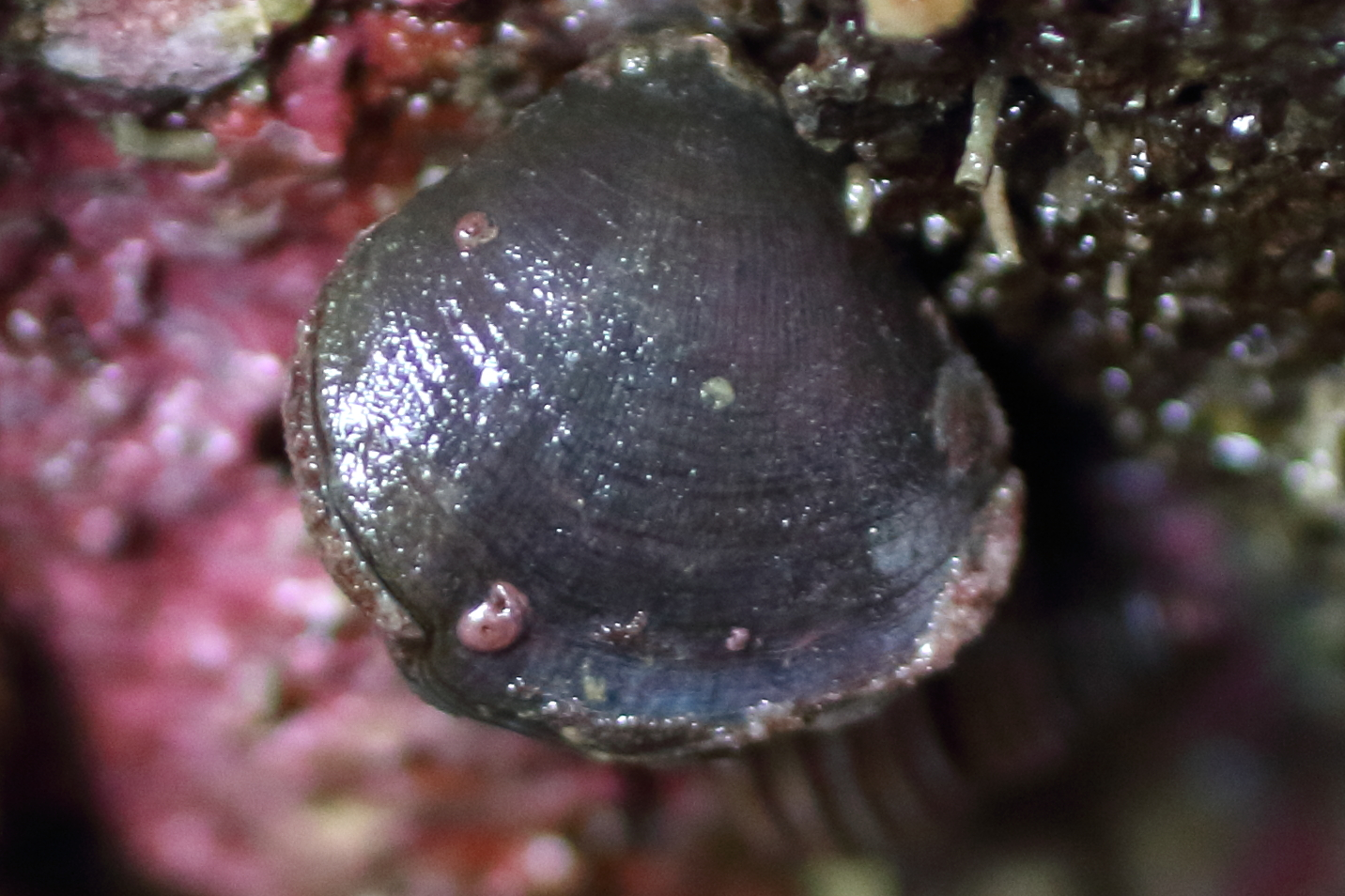
- Hemithiris psittacea

Scientific classification
- Domain: Eukaryota
- Kingdom: Animalia
- Phylum: Brachiopoda
- Class: Rhynchonellata
- Order: Rhynchonellida
- Family: Hemithirididae
- Genus: Hemithiris d'Orbigny, 1847

= Hemithiris =

Genus of brachiopods

Hemithiris is a genus of brachiopods belonging to the family Hemithirididae.

The species of this genus are found in Europe and Northern America.

Species:

- Hemithiris braunsi Hayasaka, 1938
- Hemithiris dibbleei Hertlein & Grant IV, 1944
- Hemithiris parvillima Sacco, 1902
- Hemithiris peculiaris Nomura & Hatai, 1936
- Hemithiris psittacea (Gmelin, 1791)
- Hemithiris woodwardi (Adams, 1863)
- Hemithyris antarctica (Buckman, 1910)
- Hemithyris astoriana Dall, 1909
- Hemithyris braunsi Hayasaka, 1928
- Hemithyris peculiaris Nomura & Hatai, 1936
