= Notosariidae =

Scientific classification
- Domain: Eukaryota
- Kingdom: Animalia
- Phylum: Brachiopoda
- Class: Rhynchonellata
- Order: Rhynchonellida
- Family: Notosariidae

Family of brachiopods

Notosariidae is a family of brachiopods belonging to the order Rhynchonellida.

Genera:

- Notosaria Cooper, 1959
- †Paraplicirhynchia Bitner, 1996
- †Plicirhynchia Allan, 1947
- †Protegulorhynchia Owen, 1980
- †Wekarhynchia Hiller, 2011
