= Parasphenarina =

Scientific classification
- Domain: Eukaryota
- Kingdom: Animalia
- Phylum: Brachiopoda
- Class: Rhynchonellata
- Order: Rhynchonellida
- Family: Frieleiidae
- Genus: Parasphenarina; Motchurova-Dekova, Saito & Endo, 2002

Synonyms
- †Sphenarina Cooper, 1959

Genus of brachiopods

Parasphenarina is a genus of brachiopods belonging to the family Frieleiidae.

Species:

- Parasphenarina cavernicola Motchuro-Dekova, Saito & Endo, 2002
- Parasphenarina ezogremena (Zezina, 1981)
