= Basiliolidae =

Scientific classification
- Kingdom: Animalia
- Phylum: Brachiopoda
- Class: Rhynchonellata
- Order: Rhynchonellida
- Family: Basiliolidae

Family of brachiopods

Basiliolidae is a family of brachiopods belonging to the order Rhynchonellida.

== Genera ==
Genera:

- Acanthobasiliola Zezina, 1981
- Aetheia Thomson, 1915
- Almorhynchia Ovtsharenko, 1983
