= Cryptopora (brachiopod) =

Scientific classification
- Domain: Eukaryota
- Kingdom: Animalia
- Phylum: Brachiopoda
- Class: Rhynchonellata
- Order: Rhynchonellida
- Family: Cryptoporidae
- Genus: Cryptopora; Jeffreys, 1869

Genus of brachiopods

Cryptopora is a genus of brachiopods belonging to the family Cryptoporidae.

The species of this genus are found in all oceans.

Species:

- Cryptopora boettgeri Helmcke, 1940
- Cryptopora curiosa Cooper, 1973
- Cryptopora gnomon Jeffreys, 1869
- Cryptopora hesperis Cooper, 1982
- Cryptopora maldiviensis Muir-Wood, 1959
- Cryptopora norfolkensis Bitner, 2009
- Cryptopora rectimarginata Cooper, 1959
