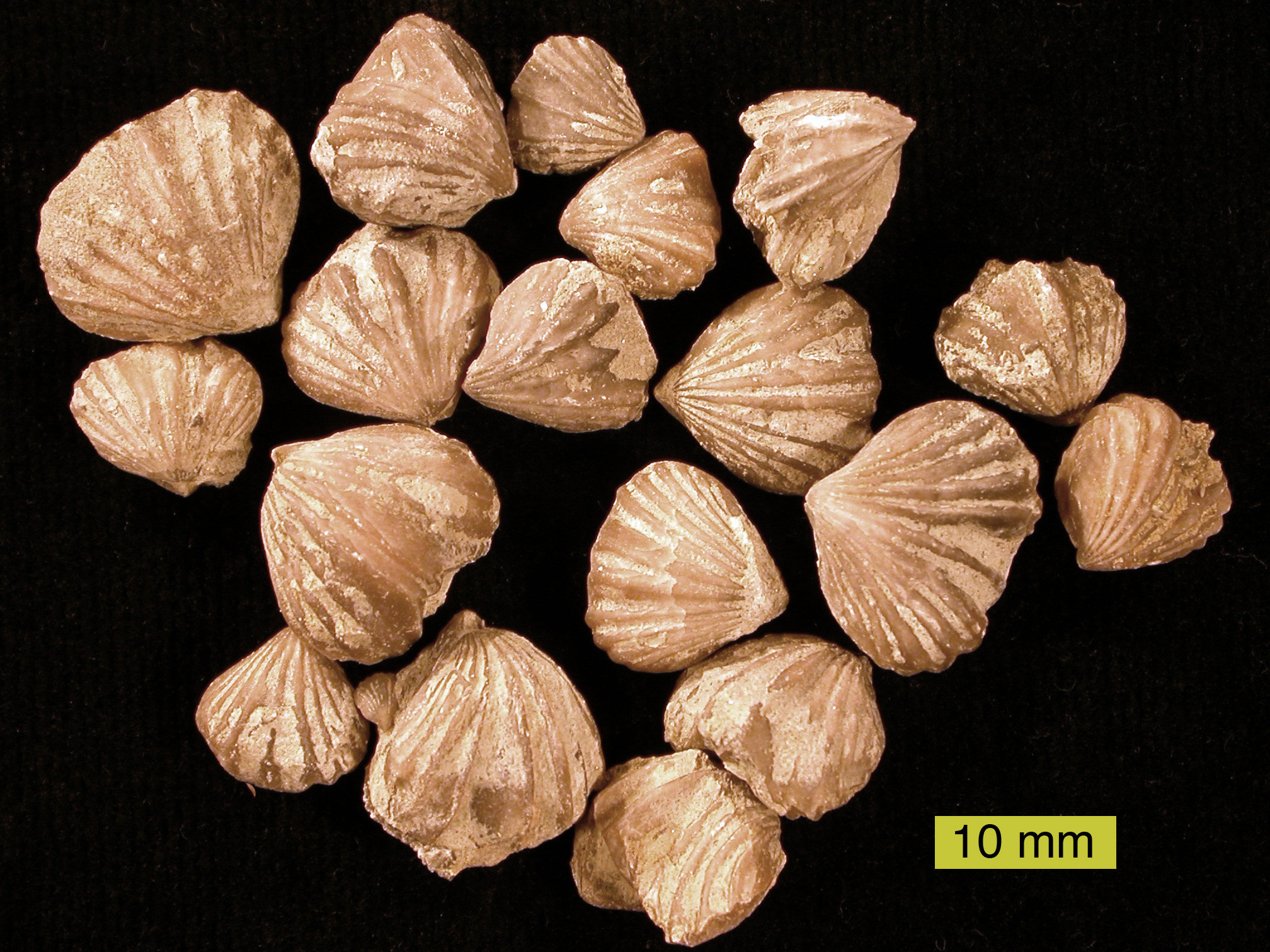
- Rhynchotrema dentatum, a rhynchonellid brachiopod from the Cincinnatian (Upper Ordovician) of SE Indiana.

Scientific classification
- Kingdom: Animalia
- Phylum: Brachiopoda
- Class: Rhynchonellata
- Order: Rhynchonellida; Kuhn, 1949

Subgroups
- See text.

= Rhynchonellida =

Rhynchonellida Temporal range: Upper Ordovician–Recent

Order of brachiopods

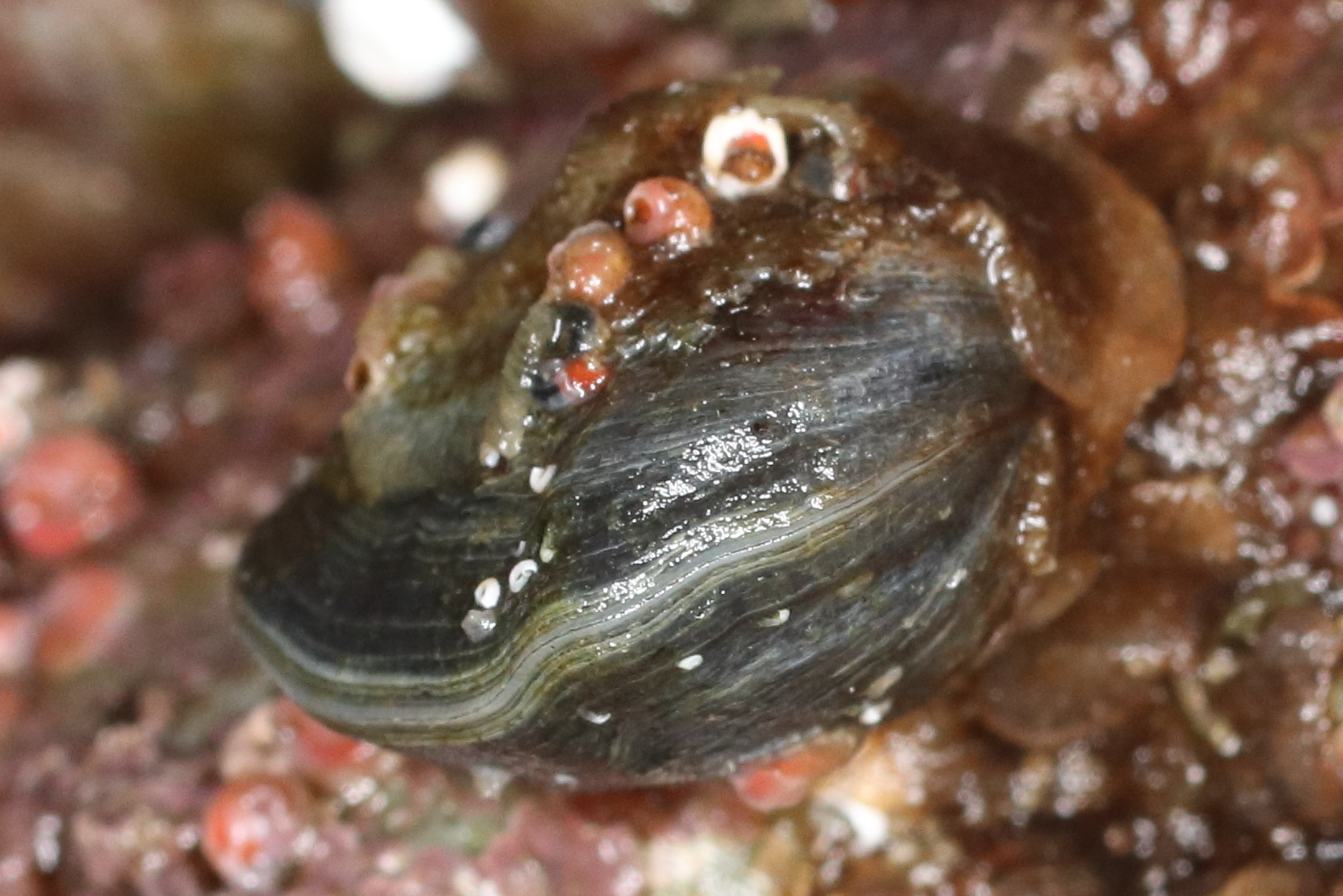
Hemithiris psittacea, a living rhynchonellide

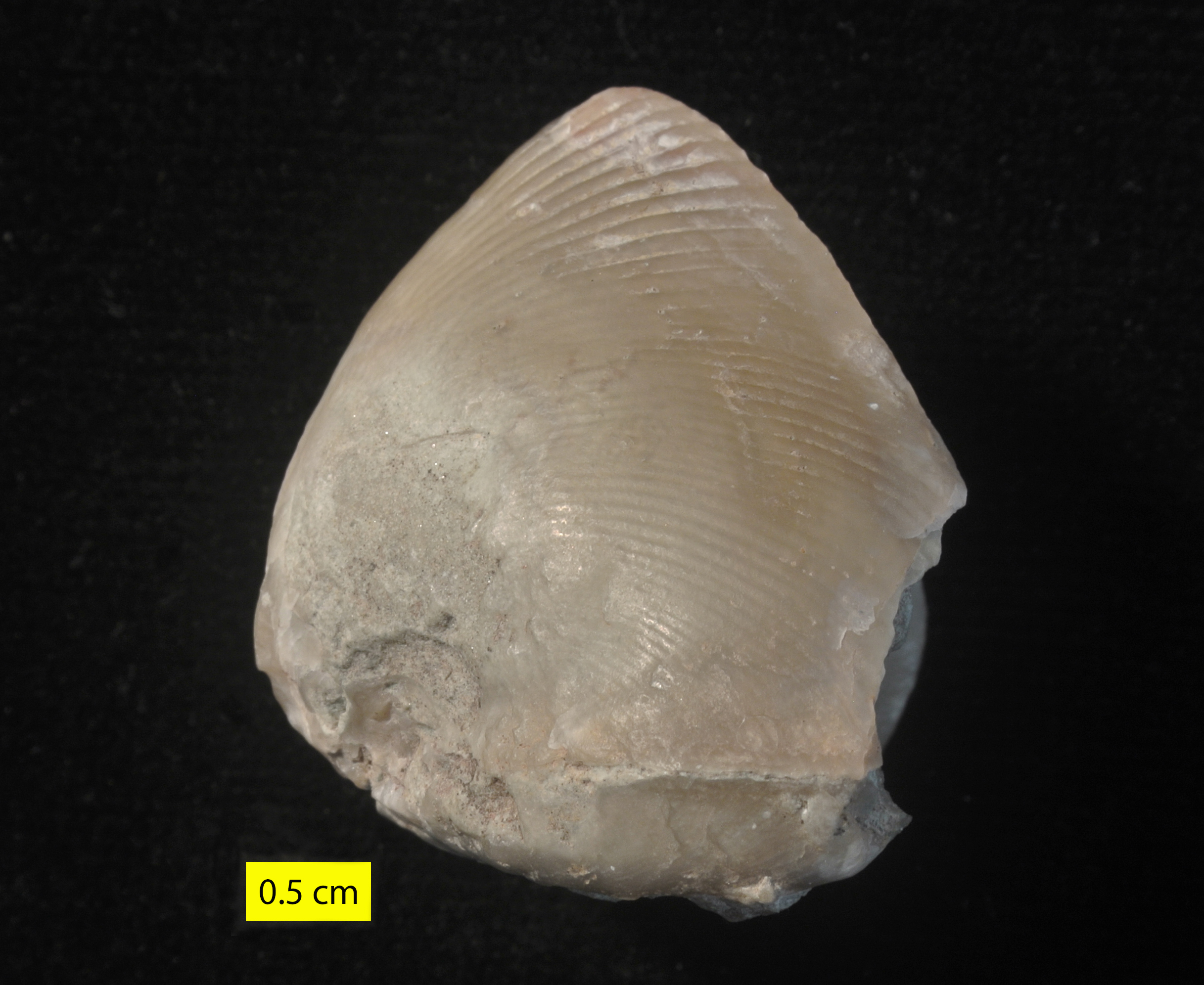
Ladogia sp., a rhynchonellid brachiopod from the Devonian of western Russia (side view).

The taxonomic order Rhynchonellida is one of the two main groups of living articulate brachiopods, the other being the order Terebratulida. They are recognized by their strongly ribbed wedge-shaped or nut-like shells, and the very short hinge line.

The hinges come to a point, a superficial resemblance to many (phylogenetically unrelated) bivalve mollusk shells. The loss of the hinge line was an important evolutionary innovation, rhynchonellids being the first truly non-strophic shells with a purely internal articulation (teeth-sockets).

Strong radiating ribs are common in this group; and there are generally very strong plications or accordion-like folds on the sulcus (the long middle section) of the shell. This probably helps regulate the flow of water in and out of the shell. All rhynchonellids are biconvex (have a bulbous shell), and have a fold located in the brachial valve. This means that the commissure, the line between the two valves or shells, is zigzagged, a distinguishing characteristic of this group. The prominent beak of the pedicle valve usually overlaps that of the brachial valve, in order to allow the shell to open and close. There is usually a functional pedicle although the delthyrium may be partially closed.

Morphologically, the rhynchonellid has changed little since its appearance during the Ordovician period. It seems to have evolved from pentamerids, and in turn gave rise to the first atrypids and athyrids, both of which are characterized by the development of a complex spiral brachidium. Although much diminished by the terminal Paleozoic extinction, it experienced a revival during the Early Jurassic period, and became the most abundant of all brachiopods during the Mesozoic Era.

== Classification ==
This classification down to the level of genera is based on Kazlev and Emig.

Extant subgroups

- Superfamily Pugnacoidea
  - Family Basiliolidae
    - Subfamily Acanthobasiliolinae
      - Acanthobasiliola
    - Subfamily Basiliolinae
      - Basiliola
      - Basiliolella
      - Eohemithiris
      - Rhytirhynchia
    - Subfamily uncertain
      - Striarina
- Superfamily Dimerelloidea
  - Family Cryptoporidae
      - Aulites
      - Cryptopora
- Superfamily Norelloidea
  - Family Frieleiidae
    - Subfamily Freileiinae
      - Frieleia
      - Compsothyris
      - Grammetaria
      - Sphenarina
    - Subfamily Hispanirhynchiinae
      - Abyssorhynchia
      - Hispanirhynchia
      - Manithyris
      - Parasphenarina
    - Subfamily Neorhynchiinae
      - Neorhynchia
  - Family Tethyrhynchiidae
      - Tethyrhynchia
- Superfamily Hemithiridoidea
  - Family Hemithyrididae
      - Hemithiris
      - Pemphixina
  - Family Notosariidae
      - Notosaria

Extinct subgroups

- Superfamily Ancistrorhynchoidea
- Superfamily Camarotoechioidea
- Superfamily Lambdarinoidea
- Superfamily Rhynchonelloidea
- Superfamily Rhynchoporoidea
- Superfamily Rhynchotetradoidea
- Superfamily Rhynchotrematoidea
- Superfamily Stenoscismatoidea
- Superfamily Uncinuloidea
- Superfamily Wellerelloidea
