= Praeactinocamax =

Scientific classification
- Kingdom: Animalia
- Phylum: Mollusca
- Class: Cephalopoda
- Order: †Belemnitida
- Family: †Belemnitellidae
- Genus: †Praeactinocamax; Naidin, 1963
- Species: †P. plenus

Binomial name
- †Praeactinocamax plenus (de Blainville, 1827)

Extinct cephalopod

Praeactinocamax plenus is an extinct cephalopod. Its fossils are found in the Cenomanian. It has been described by Blainville in 1827 under the name Belemnites plenus. In 1997, it was recombined as Praeactinocamax plenus by Kostak. It is the only species in the genus Praeactinocamax.
