= List of brachiopod genera =

This is a list of brachiopod genera which includes both extinct (fossil) forms and extant (living) genera (bolded). Names are according to the conventions of the International Code of Zoological Nomenclature.

== A ==
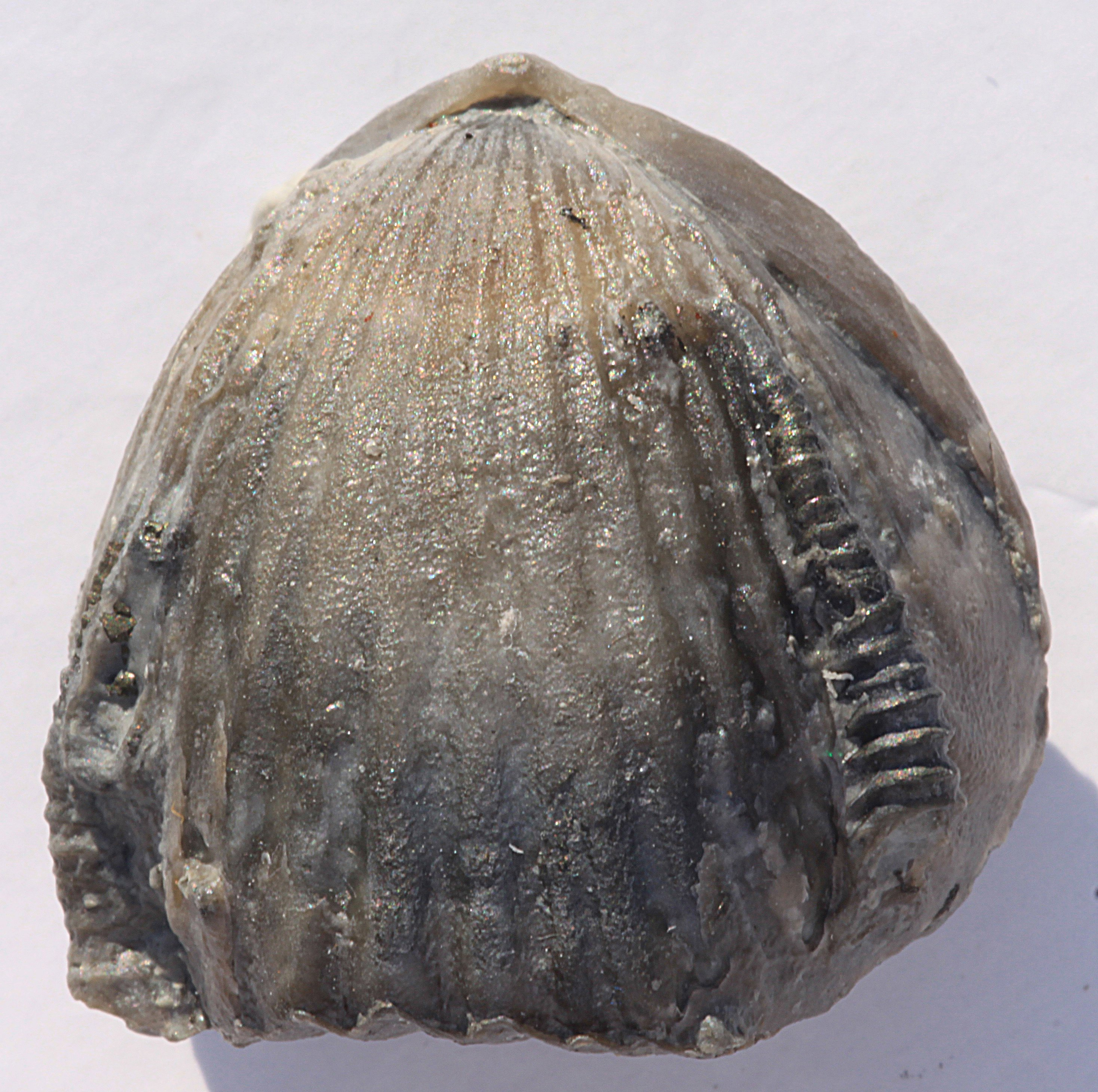
Anastrophia internascens, view of the brachial valve, with two Cornulites epibionts (the ribbed tubes)

- Aalenirhynchia
- Aberia
- Aboriginella
- Abrekia
- Absenticosta
- **Abyssorhynchia**
- **Abyssothyris**
- Acambona
- Acanthalosia
- Acanthambonia
- Acanthatia
- **Acanthobasiliola**
- Acanthocosta
- Acanthocrania
- Acanthoglypha
- Acanthoplecta
- Acanthoproductus
- Acanthorhynchia
- Acanthorthis
- Acanthospirifer
- Acanthospirina
- Acanthothyris
- Acanthothyropsis
- Acanthotoechia
- Acareorthis
- Acculina
- Achunoproductus
- Acidotocarena
- Acolosia
- Acosarina
- Acritosia
- **Acrobelesia** (fossil per IRMNG)
- **Acrobrochus**
- Acrospirifer
- Acrothele
- Acrothyra
- Acrothyris
- Acrotreta
- Acrotretella
- Actinoconchus
- Actinomena
- Acuminothyris
- Acutatheca
- Acutella
- Acutilineolus
- Acutoria
- Adairia
- Adaptatrypa
- Adectorhynchus
- Adenus
- Adiaphragma
- Adminiculoria
- Admixtella
- Admodorugosus
- Adnatida
- Adolfia
- Adolfispirifer
- Adrenia
- Advenina
- Adygella
- Adygelloides
- Adygellopsis
- Aegiria
- Aegironites
- Aemula
- Aenigmastricklandia
- Aenigmastrophia
- Aenigmathyris
- Aequispiriferina
- Aerithyris
- **Aerothyris**
- Aesopomum
- Aetheia
- Aethirhynchia
- Afghanospirifer
- Afilasma
- Agarhyncha
- Agastapleura
- Agelesia
- Agerinella
- Agramatia
- **Agulhasia**
- Agyrekia
- Ahtiella
- Aidynkulirhynchia
- Airtonia
- Ajukuzella
- Akatchania
- Akelina
- Akopovorhynchia
- Aktassia
- Alabusherothyris
- Alaskospira
- Alatiformia
- Alatoproductus
- Alatorthotetina
- Aldaniopirifer
- Aldanotreta
- Aldingia
- Alekseevaella
- Alexenia
- Alichovia
- Aliconchidium
- Alimbella
- Alipunctifera
- Aliquantula
- Alisina
- Alispira
- Alispirifer
- Alispiriferella
- Alitaria
- Alithyris
- Allanella
- Allanetes
- Allorhynchoides
- Allorhynchus
- Almerarhynchia
- Almorhynchia
- Altaeorthis
- Altaestrophia
- Altaethyrella
- Altajella
- Altiplecus
- Altoplicatella
- Altunella
- Alvarezites
- Alwynia
- Ambardella
- Ambikella
- Ambocoelia
- Amboglossa
- Ambonorthella
- Ambothyris
- Amerista
- Amesopleura
- Ametoria
- Amictocracens
- Amissopecten
- Amoenirhynchia
- Amoenospirifer
- Amosina
- Amphiclina
- Amphiclinodonta
- Amphigenia
- Amphipella
- Amphiplecia
- Amphistrophia
- Amphistrophiella
- **Amphithyris**
- Amphitomella
- Amsdenella
- Amsdenina
- Amsdenostropiella
- Amurothyris
- Amydroptychus
- Amygdalocosta
- Anabaia
- Anabaria
- Anabolotreta
- Anadyrella
- **Anakinetica**
- Anaptychius
- Anarhynchia
- Anastrophia
- Anathyrella
- Anathyris
- Anatreta
- Anatrypa
- Anazyga
- Anchigonites
- Ancillotoechia
- Ancistrocrania
- Ancistrorhynchia
- Ancorellina
- Ancorhynchia
- Ancylostrophia
- Andalucinetes
- Andobolus
- Andreaspira
- **Aneboconcha**
- Anechophragma
- Anelotreta
- Anemonaria
- Angarella
- Angiospirifer
- Angulotreta
- Angusticardinia
- Angustothyris
- Aniabrochus
- Anidanthus
- Animonithyris
- Anisactinella
- Anisopleurella
- **Annuloplatidia**
- Anomactinella
- Anomalesia
- Anomaloglossa
- Anomaloria
- Anomalorthis
- Anoplia
- Anopliopsis
- Anoplotheca
- Anoptambonites
- Ansehia
- Antelocoelia
- Anteridocus
- Antezeilleria
- Anthracospirifer
- Antigonambonites
- Antigoniarcula
- Antinomia
- Antiptychina
- Antiquatonia
- Antirhynchonella
- Antispirifer
- Antistrix
- Antistrixia
- Antizygospira
- Antronaria
- Anulatrypa
- Anx
- Aorhynchia
- Aparimarhynchia
- Apatecosia
- Apatobolus
- Apatomorpha
- Apatorthis
- Apatoskenidioides
- Aperispirifer
- Apertirhynchella
- Aphanomena
- Aphaurosia
- Apheathyris
- Aphelesia
- Aphelotreta
- Apheoorthina
- Apheoorthis
- Aphragmus
- Apicilirella
- Apletosia
- Apodosia
- Apollonorthis
- Apomatella
- Apopentamerus
- Aporthophyla
- Aporthophylina
- Apothyris
- Apousiella
- Apringia
- Apsilingula
- Apsocalymma
- Apsotreta
- Arabatia
- Arabicella
- Araksalosia
- Araneatrypa
- Arapsopleurum
- Araspirifer
- Aratanea
- Aratella
- Aratoechia
- Araxathyris
- Araxilevis
- Arbizustrophia
- Arcelinithyris
- Arceythyris
- Archaeorthis
- Archaiosteges
- Archeochonetes
- Arcosarina
- Arcticalosia
- Arctireta
- Arctispira
- Arctochonetes
- Arctohedra
- Arctomeristina
- **Arctosia** (fossil per IRMNG)
- Arctothyris
- Arcualla
- Arcuatothyris
- Arcullina
- Ardiviscus
- Ardmosteges
- Arduspirifer
- Areella
- Arenaciarcula
- Arenorthis
- Areostrophia
- Argella
- Argentiproductus
- Argorhynx
- Argovithyris
- **Argyrotheca**
- Arionthia
- Arktikina
- Aromasithyris
- Articalosia
- Artimyctella
- Artiotreta
- Artospirifer
- Aseptagypa
- Aseptalium
- Aseptella
- Aseptirhynchia
- Aseptonetes
- Asiarhynchia
- Asioproductus
- Askepasma
- Asperlinus
- Aspidothyris
- Aspinosella
- Astaristrophia
- Astegosia
- Astraborthis
- Astua
- Asturorthis
- Astutorhyncha
- Asymmetrochonetes
- Asymphylotoechia
- Asyrinx
- Asyrinxia
- Atactosia
- Atelelasma
- Atelelasmoidea
- Atelestegastus
- Atelithyris
- Athabaschia
- Athyrhynchus
- Athyris
- Athyrisina
- Athyrisinoides
- Athyrisinopsis
- Athyrorhynchia
- Atlanticocoelia
- Atlantida
- Atribonium
- Atrypa
- Atryparia
- Atrypella
- Atrypellina
- Atrypina
- Atrypinella
- Atrypinopsis
- Atrypoidea
- Atrypopsis
- Atrypunculus
- Atrythyris
- Attenuatella
- Auchmerella
- Aucklandirhynchia
- Aulacatrypa
- Aulacella
- Aulacorphora
- Aulacothyris
- Aulacothyroides
- Aulacothyropsis
- Aulidospira
- Aulie
- **Aulites**
- Aulonotreta
- Auloprotonia
- Aulosteges
- Auricolispina
- Austinella
- Australiarcula
- Australina
- Australirhynchia
- Australispira
- Australocoelia
- Australosia
- Australospirifer
- Australostrophia
- Austriellula
- Austrirhynchia
- Austrochoristites
- Austrohedra
- Austronoplia
- Austrospirifer
- Austrothyris
- Avisyrinx
- Avonia
- Avonothyris
- Axiodeaneia
- Azamella
- Azygidium

== B ==
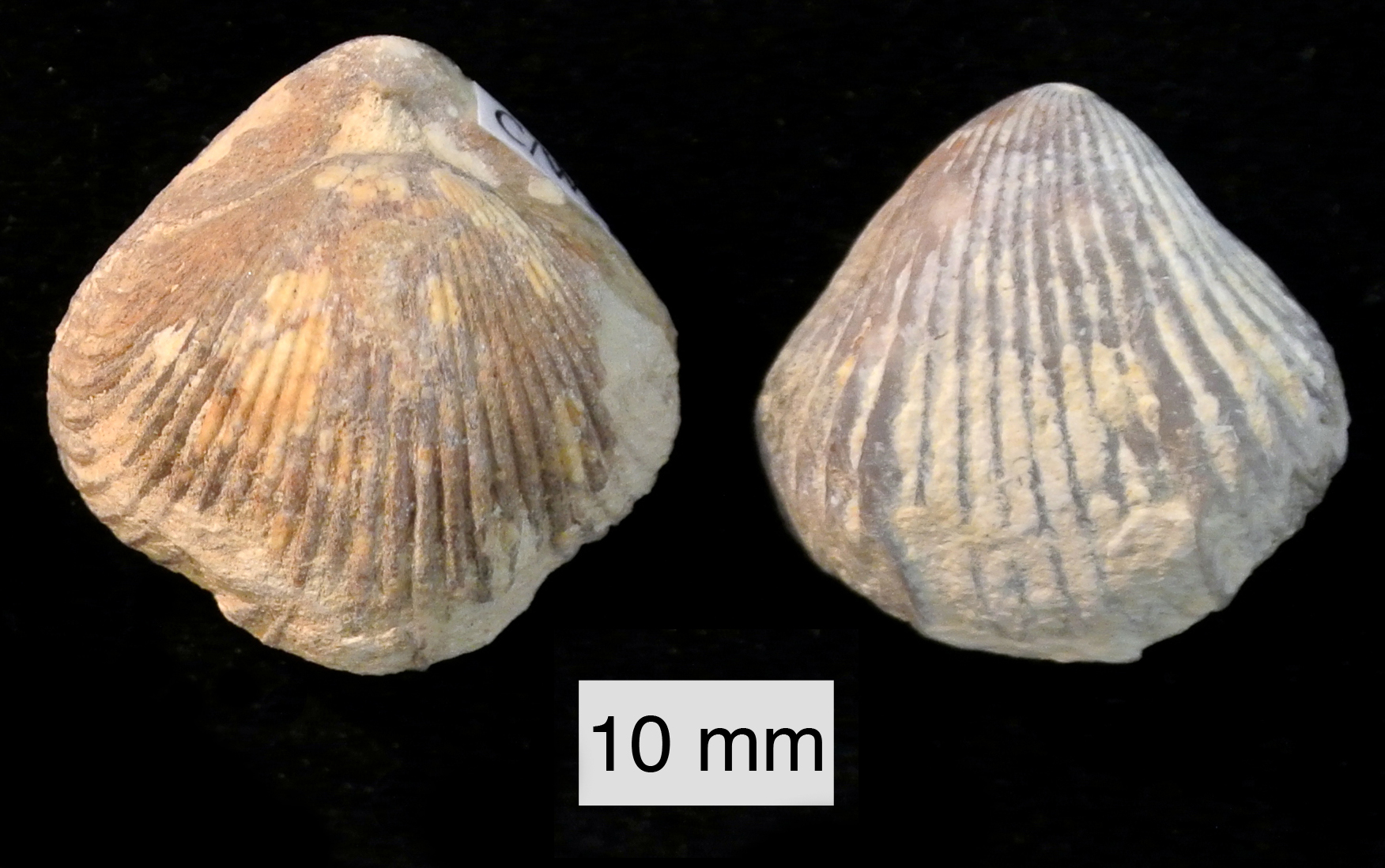
Burmirhynchia jirbaensis (Jurassic of Israel).

- Babinia Racheboeuf & Branisa, 1985
- Babukella
- Backhausina
- Bactrynium
- Badainjarania
- Baeorhynchia
- Bagnorthis
- Bagrasia
- Bailongjiangella
- Baissalosteges
- Bajanhongorella
- Bajanorthis
- Bajarinovia
- Bajtugania
- Bakonyithyris
- Balakhonia
- Balanoconcha
- Balatonspira
- Balkhasheconcha
- Bancroftina
- Bandoproductus
- Baranovus = Obscurella Baranov, 1991 (preoccupied)
- Barbaestrophia
- Barbarorthis
- Barbarothyris
- Barbatulella
- Barkolia
- Barrandina
- Barroisella
- Barunkhuraya
- Barzellinia
- Bashkiria
- Basilicorhynchus
- **Basiliola**
- **Basiliolella**
- Bateridium
- Baterospirifer
- Bathymyonia
- **Bathynanus**
- Bathyrhyncha
- Baturria
- Bazardarella
- Beachia
- Beckmannia
- Becsia
- Beecheria
- Beichuanella
- Beichuanrhynchus
- Beitaia
- Bejrutella
- Bekkeromena
- Belbekella
- Beleutella
- Bellaclathrus
- Bellimurina
- Belothyris
- Bergalaria
- Beschevella
- Betterbergia
- Biarea
- Bibatiola
- Bicarinatina
- Bicepsirhynchia
- Bicia
- Biconostrophia
- Biconvexiella
- Bicuspina
- Bidentatus
- Biernatella
- Biernatia
- Biernatium
- Bifida
- Bifolium
- Bihendulirhynchia
- Bihenithyris
- Bilaminella
- Billingsella
- Bilobia
- Bilotina
- Bimuria
- Biparetis
- Biplatyconcha
- Biplicatoria
- Birchsella
- Bisculcata
- Biseptum
- Bisinocoelia
- Bistramia
- Bisulcina
- Bitternella
- Bittnerella
- Bleshidium
- Blyskavomena
- Bobinella
- Bodrakella
- Bohemiella
- Bohemirhynchia
- Boicinetes
- Bojodouvillina
- Bojothyris
- Bolgarithyris
- Bolilaspirifer
- Bomina
- Boonderella
- Booralia
- Boreadocamara
- Boreadorthis
- Borealirhynchia
- Borealis
- Boreiospira
- Boreiothyris
- Bornhardtina
- Borua
- Bosquetella
- Bothrionia
- Bothrostegium
- Bothrothyris
- Boticum
- Botsfordia
- Boubeithyris
- **Bouchardia** (fossil per IRMNG)
- Bouchardiella
- Boucotella
- Boucotia
- Boucotides
- Boucotinskia
- Boucotstrophia
- Bowanorthis
- Bozshakolia
- Brachymimulus
- Brachyprion
- Brachyspirifer
- Brachythyrina
- Brachythyrinella
- Brachythyris
- Brachyzyga
- Bracteoleptaena
- Bradfordirhynchia
- Brahimorthis
- Brandysia
- Branikia
- Brantonites
- Brasilioproductus
- Breileenia
- Brevicamera
- Brevilamnulella
- Brevipelta
- Breviseptum
- Brevispirifer
- Brimethyris
- Brochocarina
- Broeggeria
- Bronnothyris
- Brooksina
- Browneella
- Brunnirhyncha
- Bryorhynchus
- Bucequia
- Buchanathyris
- Buckmanithyris
- Bulahdelia
- Bullarina
- Bullothyris
- Buntoxia
- Burmirhynchia
- Burovia
- Burrirhynchia
- Busulcata
- Butkovia
- Buxtonia
- Buxtoniella
- Buxtonioides
- Bynguanoia
- Bystromena

== C ==
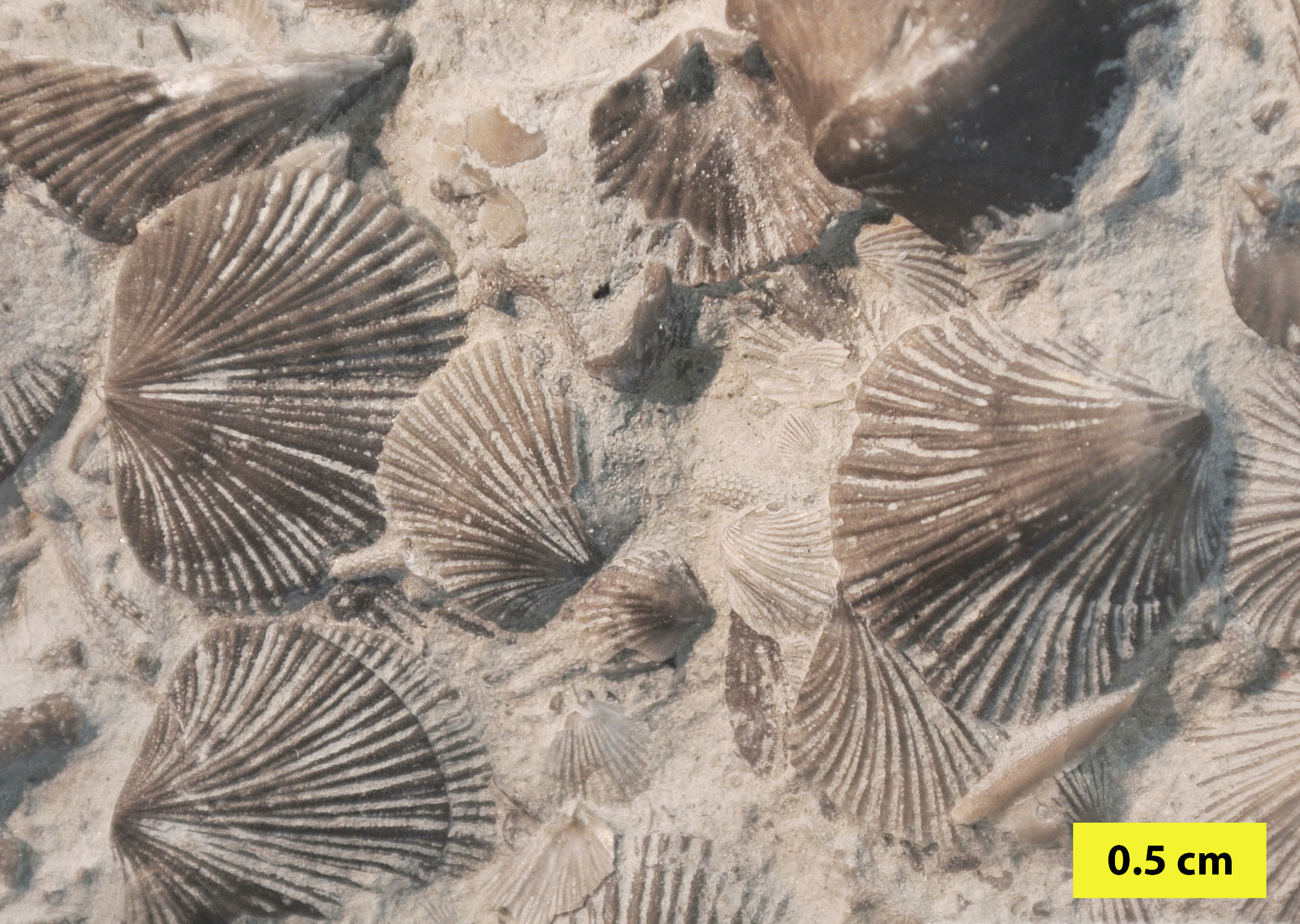
Ordovician mass mortality assemblage of Cincinnetina meeki

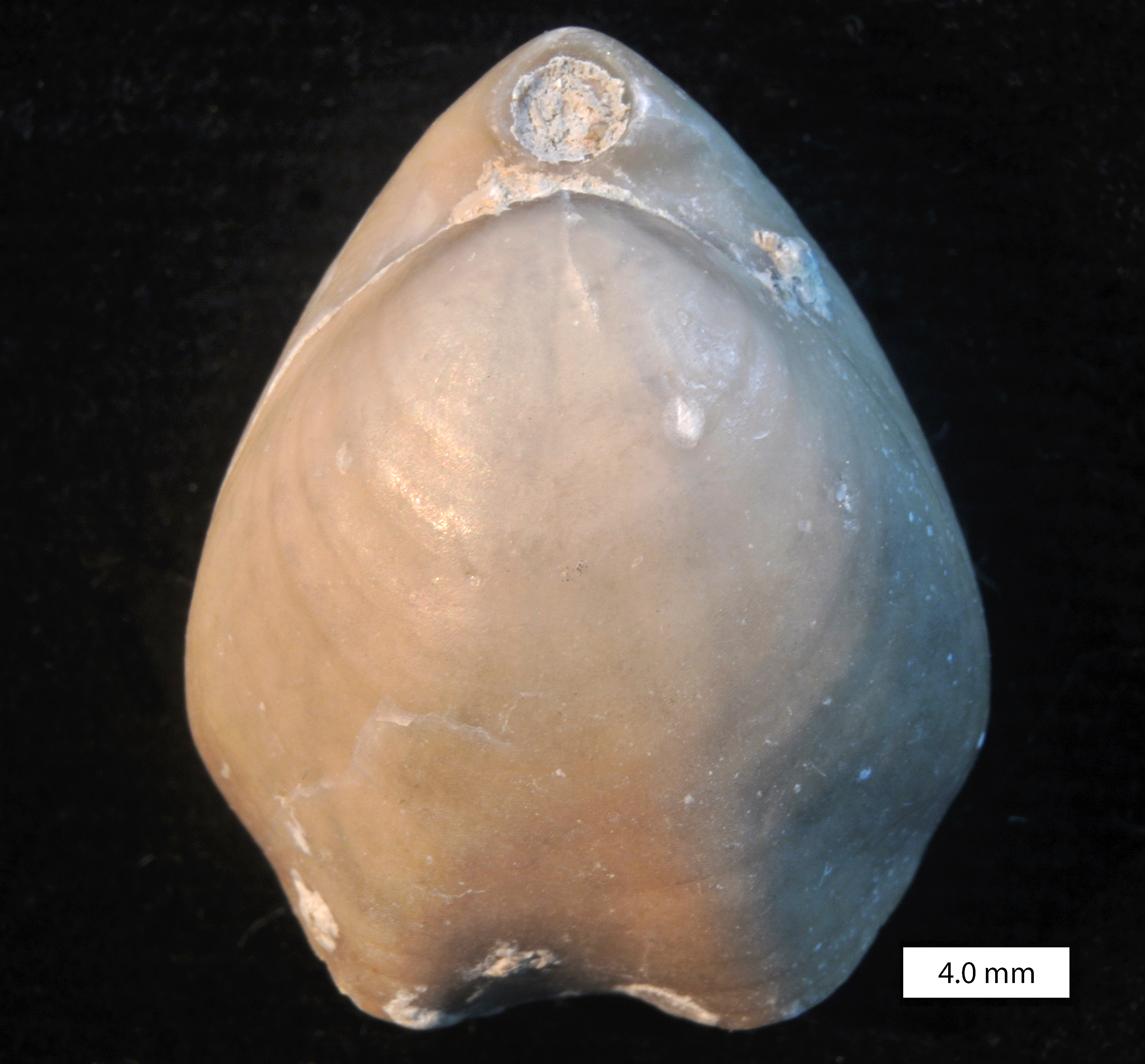
Cererithyris arkelli Almeras, 1970; dorsal view; Middle Jurassic (Bathonian); Ranville, Calvados, France. From the collection of Clive Champion.

- Cacemia
- Cactosteges
- Cadomella
- Cadudium
- Caenanoplia
- Caenotreta
- Caeroplecia
- Calcirhynchia
- Caledorhynchia
- Callaiaspida
- Callicalyptella
- Calliglypha
- Calliomarginatia
- Callipentamerus
- Callipleura
- Calliprotonia
- Callispirifer
- Callispirina
- **Calloria**
- Callospiriferina
- Callytharrella
- Calpella
- Calvinaria
- Calvirhynchia
- Calvustrigis
- Calyptolepta
- Calyptoria
- Camarelasma
- Camarium
- Camarophorella
- Camarophorina
- Camarophorinella
- Camarospira
- Camarothyridina
- Camarotoechia
- Camarotoechiodes
- Cambrotrophia
- Camerella
- Camerisma
- Camerophorina
- Camerothyris
- **Campages**
- Campylorthis
- Canadospira
- Canalitatus
- Canavirila
- Cancellospirifer
- **Cancellothyris**
- Cancrinella
- Cancrinelloides
- Candispirifer
- Cantabriella
- Canthylotreta
- Capelliniella
- Capillarina
- Capillirhynchia
- Capillirostra
- Capillispirifer
- Capillithyris
- Capillomesolobus
- Capillonia
- Caplinoplia
- Carapezzia
- Caratrypa
- Carbocyrtina
- Cardiarina
- Cardinirhynchia
- Cardinocrania
- Cardiothyris
- Caricula
- Carinagypa
- Carinatina
- Carinatinella
- Carinatothyris
- Carinatrypa
- Cariniferella
- Carinokoninckina
- Carlinia
- Carneithyris
- Carolirhynchia
- Carpatothyris
- Carpinaria
- Carringtonia
- Carteridina
- Cartorhium
- Caryogyps
- Caryona
- Caryorhynchus
- Casquella
- Cassianospira
- Cassidirostrum
- Castellaroina
- Catacephalus
- Catazyga
- Cathaysia
- Caucasella
- Caucasiproductus
- Caucasoproductus
- Caucasorhynchia
- Caucasothyris
- Cavatisinurostrum
- Cedulia
- Celdobolus
- Celebetes
- Celidocrania
- Celsifornix
- Celtanoplia
- Cenorhynchia
- Centronella
- Centronelloidea
- Ceocypea
- Ceramisia
- Cerasina
- Ceratreta
- Cerberatrypa
- Cererithyris
- Chaeniorhynchus
- Chaganella
- Chalimochonetes
- Changshaispirifer
- Changtangella
- Changyangrhynchus
- Chaoiella
- Chaoina
- Chapadella
- Chapinella
- Charionella
- Charionoides
- Charltonithyris
- Chascothyris
- Chathamithyris
- Chattertonia
- Chatwinothyris
- Chaulistomella
- Cheirothyris
- Cheirothyropsis
- Chelononia
- Cheniothyris
- Chenxianoproductus
- Cherkesovaena
- Cherubicornea
- Chianella
- Chile
- Chilianshania
- Chilidiopsis
- Chilidorthis
- Chimaerothyris
- Chivatschella
- **Chlidonophora**
- Chlupacina
- Chlupacitoechia
- Chnaurocoelia
- Choanodus
- Chondronia
- Chonetella
- Chonetes
- Chonetina
- Chonetinella
- Chonetinetes
- Chonetipustula
- Chonetoidea
- Chonopectella
- Chonopectoides
- Chonopectus
- Chonosteges
- Chonostegoidella
- Chonostegoides
- Chonostrophia
- Chonostrophiella
- Choperella
- Choristitella
- Choristites
- Choristothyris
- Christianella (brachiopod)
- Christiania
- Chrustenopora
- Chynistrophia
- Cillinella
- Cimicinella
- Cimicinoides
- Cincinnetina
- Cincta
- Cinctifera
- Cinctopsis
- Cinerorthis
- Cingolospiriferina
- Cingulella
- Cingulodermis
- Cirpa
- Cistellarcula
- Claratrypa
- Clarkeia
- Clarkella
- Clathrithyris
- Clavigera
- Clavodalejina
- Cleiothyridina
- Cliftonia
- Clinambon
- Clintonella
- Clistotrema
- Clitambonites
- Clivospirifer
- Clorinda
- Clorindella
- Clorindina
- Clorindinella
- Cloudella
- Cloudothyris
- **Cnismatocentrum**
- Coelospira
- Coelospirella
- Coelospirina
- Coeloterorhynchus
- Coenothyris
- Colaptomena
- Coledium
- Colinella
- Collarothyris
- Collemataria
- Colletostracia
- Collinithyris
- Collumatus
- Colongina
- Colophragma
- Colosia
- Colpotoria
- Columellithyris
- Comatopoma
- Comelicania
- Comiotoechia
- Companteris
- Composita
- Compositella
- Compressoproductus
- **Compsothyris**
- Comuquia
- Conarosia
- Conarothyris
- Conchidium
- Concinnispirifer
- Concinnithyris
- Conispirifer
- Connectoproductus
- Conodiscus
- Conomimus
- Conotreta
- Contradouvillinia
- Convexothyris
- Coolinia
- Cooperina
- Cooperispira
- Cooperithyris
- Cooperrhynchia
- Coptothyris
- Corbicularia
- Cordatomyonia
- Corineorthis
- Coriothyris
- Cornwallia
- Coronalosia
- Corrugatimediorostrum
- Cortezorthis
- Corvinopugnax
- Corylispirifer
- Coscinarina
- Coscinophora
- Costachonetes
- Costacranaena
- Costalosiella
- Costanoplia
- Costatispirifer
- Costatrypa
- Costatumulus
- Costellarina
- Costellirostra
- Costellispirifer
- Costicrura
- Costiferina
- Costinorella
- Costirhynchia
- Costisorthis
- Costispinifera
- Costispirifer
- Costispiriferina
- Costisteges
- Costistricklandia
- Costistrophomena
- Costistrophonella
- Costitrimerella
- Costoconcha
- Craigella
- Cranaena
- Crania
- Craniops
- Craniotreta
- Craniscus
- Craspedalosia
- Craspedelia
- Craspedona
- Crassatrypa
- Crassipunctatrypa
- Crassumbo
- Cratispirifer
- Cratorhynchonella
- Cratospirifer
- Cremnorthis
- Crenispirifer
- Cretirhynchia
- Cricosia
- Crinisaria
- Crinisarina
- Crinistrophia
- Cristicoma
- Cristiferina
- Cromatrypa
- Crossacanthia
- Crossalosia
- Crossiskenidium
- Crozonorthis
- Cruralina
- Cruratula
- Cruricella
- Crurirhynchia
- Crurispina
- Crurithyris
- Cryptacanthia
- Cryptatrypa
- Cryptonella
- **Cryptopora**
- Cryptoporella
- Cryptorhynchia
- Cryptospirifer
- Cryptothyris
- Cryptotreta
- Ctenalosia
- Ctenochonetes
- Ctenokoninckina
- Cubacula
- Cubanirhynchia
- Cubanothyris
- Cudmorella
- Cuersithyris
- Cumberlandina
- Cuneirhynchia
- Cuparius
- Cupularostrum
- Curticia
- Curtirhynchia
- Cycladigera
- Cyclantharia
- Cyclocoelia
- Cyclomyonia
- Cyclorhynchia
- Cyclospira
- Cyclothyris
- Cymatorhynchia
- Cymbidium
- Cymbistropheodonta
- Cymbithyris
- Cymbricia
- Cymidia
- Cymoproductus
- Cymostrophia
- Cyndalia
- Cyphomena
- Cyphomenoidea
- Cyphotalosia
- Cyphoterorhynchus
- Cyranoia
- Cyrbasiotreta
- Cyrolexis
- Cyrtalosia
- Cyrtella
- Cyrtia
- Cyrtina
- Cyrtinaella
- Cyrtinoides
- Cyrtinopsis
- Cyrtiopsis
- Cyrtiorina
- Cyrtoniscus
- Cyrtonotella
- Cyrtonotreta
- Cyrtospirifer
- Cyrtothyris
- Cystothyris

== D ==
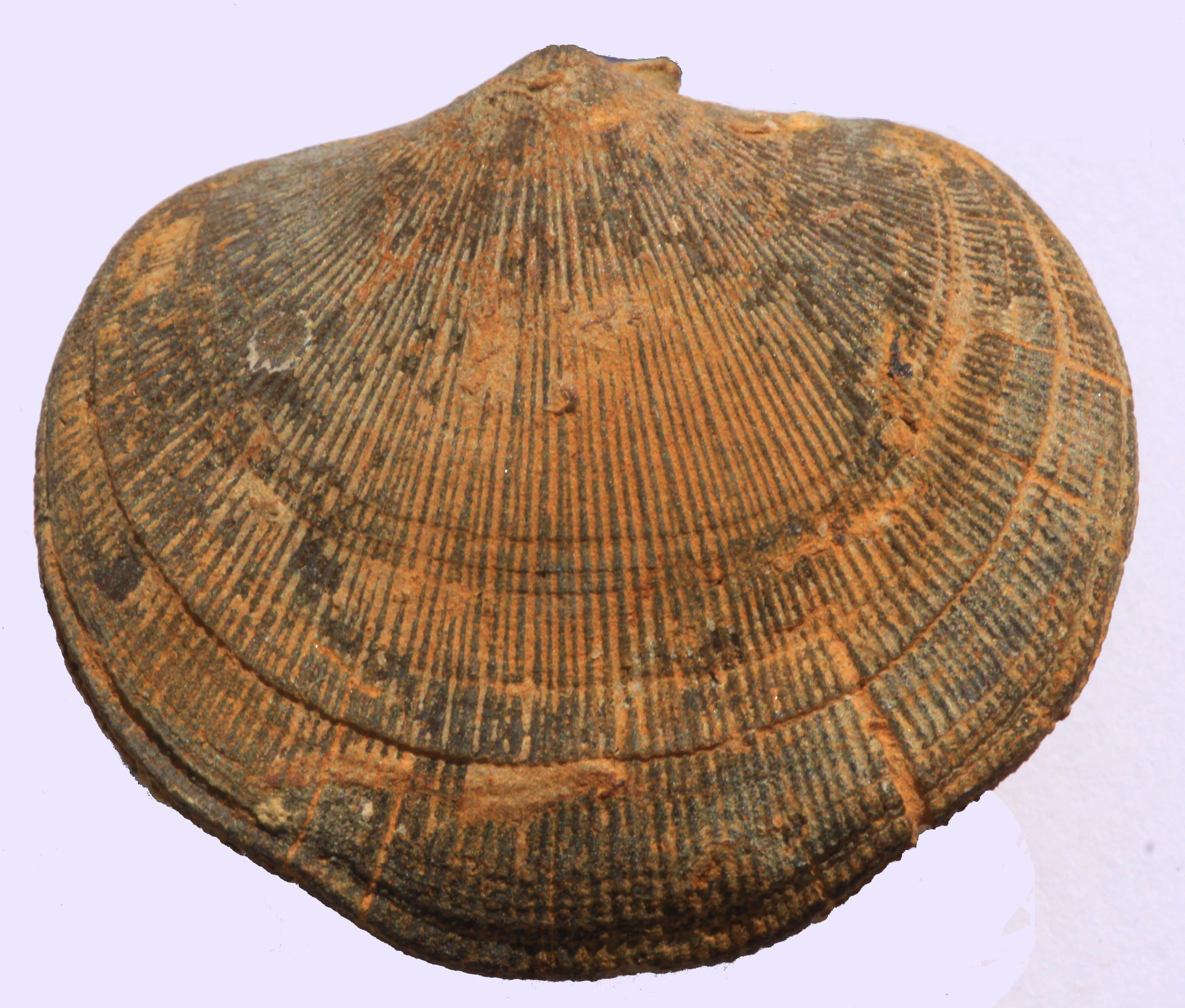
Dagnachonetes supragibbosa, view of the brachial valve, Middle Devonian (Eifelian)

- Dabashanospira
- Dactylogonia
- Dactylotreta
- Daghanirhynchia
- Dagnachonetes
- Dagysorhynchia
- Dagyspirifer
- Dalaia
- Dalejina
- Dalejodiscus
- Dalerhynchus
- Dalinuria
- Dalligas
- **Dallina**
- Dallinella
- **Dallithyris**
- Dalmanella
- Dalmanellopsis
- Danella
- Danzania
- Darvasia
- Dasyalosia
- Dasysaria
- Datangia
- Davidsonella
- Davidsonia
- Davidsoniatrypa
- Davidsonina
- Daviesiella
- Davinirhynchia
- Davoustia
- Dawsonelloides
- Dayia
- Dearbornia
- Decoropugnax
- Decurtella
- Dedzetina
- Delepinea
- Deltachania
- Deltarhynchia
- Deltarina
- Delthyris
- Deltospirifer
- Demonedys
- Dengalosia
- Densalvus
- Densepustula
- Denticuliphoria
- Dentospiriferina
- Derbyella
- Derbyia
- Derbyina
- Derbyoides
- Dereta
- Desatrypa
- Desistrophia
- Desmoinesia
- Desmorthis
- Desquamatia
- Devonalosia
- Devonamphistrophia
- Devonaria
- Devonochonetes
- Devonoproductus
- Diabolirhynchia
- Diambonia
- Diambonioidea
- Diandongia
- Diaphelasma
- Diaphragmus
- Diazoma
- Dicamara
- Dicamaropsis
- Dicellomus
- Diceromyonia
- Dichacaenia
- Dichospirifer
- Dichozygopleura
- Dicoelosia
- Dicoelospirifer
- Dicoelostrophia
- Dicondylotreta
- Dictyobolus
- Dictyoclostoidea
- Dictyoclostus
- Dictyonina
- Dictyonites
- Dictyostrophia
- Dictyothyris
- Dictyothyropsis
- Dicystoconcha
- Didymelasma
- Didymoparcium
- Didymothyris
- Diedrothyris
- Dielasma
- Dielasmella
- Dielasmina
- Dienope
- Dierisma
- Diestothyris
- Dignomia
- Digonella
- Dihelictera
- Diholkorhynchia
- Dilophosina
- Dimegelasma
- Dimensionaequalirostrum
- Dimerella
- Dinarella
- Dinarispira
- Dinobolus
- Dinorthis
- Diochthofera
- Dioristella
- Diorthelasma
- Diparelasma
- Diplanus
- Diplonorthis
- Diplospirella
- Dipunctella
- Diraphora
- Dirinus
- **Discina**
- **Discinisca**
- **Discradisca**
- Discinopsis
- Discomyorthis
- Discotreta
- Discradisca
- Disculina
- Disphenia
- Dispiriferina
- Dissoria
- Disulcatella
- Ditreta
- Divaricosta
- Dixonella
- Dmitria
- Dmitrispirifer
- Dnestrina
- Doescherella
- Dogdathyris
- Dogdoa
- Doleroides
- Dolerorthis
- Dolichobrochus
- Dolichomocelypha
- Dolichosina
- **Dolichozygus**
- Doloresella
- Domokhotia
- Donalosia
- Donella
- Dongbaella
- Dongbeiispirifer
- Donispirifer
- Dorashamia
- Dorsirugatia
- Dorsisinus
- Dorsoplicathyris
- Dorsoscyphus
- Dorytreta
- Douvillina
- Douvillinaria
- Douvillinella
- Douvillinoides
- Douvinella
- Dowhatania
- Drabodiscina
- Draborthis
- Drabovia
- Drabovinella
- Dracius
- Drahanorhynchus
- Drahanostrophia
- Drepanorhyncha
- Droharhynchia
- Druganirhynchia
- Drummuckina
- Duartea
- Dubaria
- Dubioleptina
- Dulankarella
- Dundrythyris
- Duryeella
- Dushanirhynchia
- Dyoros
- Dyschrestia
- **Dyscolia**
- **Dyscritosia** (fossil per IRMNG)
- Dyscritothyris
- **Dysedrosia** (fossil per IRMNG)
- Dysoristus
- Dysprosorthis
- Dyticospirifer
- Dzhangirhynchia
- Dzhebaglina
- Dzieduszyckia
- Dzirulina

== E ==
- Eatonia
- Eatonioides
- Eccentricosta
- Echinalosia
- Echinaria
- Echinariella
- Echinauris
- Echinirhynchia
- Echinocoelia
- Echinocoeliopsis
- Echinoconchella
- Echinoconchus
- Echinospirifer
- Echinosteges
- Echyrosia
- **Ecnomiosa**
- Ectenoglossa
- Ectochoristites
- Ectoposia
- Ectorensselandia
- Ectorhipidium
- Ectyphoria
- Edreja
- Edriosteges
- Ehlersella
- Eichwaldia
- Eifelatrypa
- Eifyris
- Eilotreta
- Ejnespirifer
- Elasmata
- Elasmothyris
- Elderra
- Elegesta
- Elenchus
- Eleutherocrania
- Eleutherokomma
- Eliorhynchus
- Elita
- Eliva
- Elivella
- Elivina
- Elkania
- Elkanisca
- Ella
- Ellassonia
- Elliottella
- Elliottina
- Elliptoglossa
- Elliptostrophia
- Elmaria
- Elymospirifer
- Elythina
- Emanuella
- Embolosia
- Emeithyris
- Enallosia
- Enallothecidea
- Enantiosphen
- Enantiosphenella
- Enchodrospirifer
- Endospirifer
- Endothyris
- Endrea
- Engenella
- Enigmalosia
- Ense
- Entacanthadus
- Enteletella
- Enteletes
- Enteletina
- Eoamphistrophia
- Eoanastrophia
- Eoantiptychia
- Eobiernatella
- Eobrachythyrina
- Eobrachythyris
- Eochonetes
- Eochoristitella
- Eochoristites
- Eocoelia
- Eoconcha
- Eoconchidium
- Eoconulus
- Eocramatia
- Eodallina
- Eodalmanella
- Eodevonaria
- Eodictyonella (formerly Dictyonella)
- Eodinobolus
- Eodiorthelasma
- Eodmitria
- Eoglossinotoechia
- Eogryphus
- Eohemithiris
- Eohowellella
- Eokarpinskia
- Eokirkidium
- Eolaballa
- Eolacazella
- Eolissochonetes
- Eolyttonia
- Eomaoristrophia
- Eomarginifera
- Eomartiniopsis
- Eomegastrophia
- Eonalivkinia
- Eoorthis
- Eoparaphorhynchus
- Eopholidostrophia
- Eoplectodonta
- Eoplicanoplia
- Eoplicoplasia
- Eoproductella
- Eopugnax
- Eoreticularia
- Eorhipidomella
- Eoscaphelasma
- Eoschizophoria
- Eoschuchertella
- Eoseptaliphoria
- Eosericoidea
- Eosiphonotreta
- Eosophragmophora
- Eosotrematorthis
- Eospinatrypa
- Eospirifer
- Eospiriferina
- Eospirigerina
- Eostrophalosia
- Eostropheodonta
- Eostrophomena
- Eostrophonella
- Eosyringothyris
- Eothecidellina
- Eothele
- Eousella
- Epelidoaegiria
- Ephippelasma
- Epicelia
- Epicyrta
- Epithyris
- Epithyroides
- Epitomyonia
- Equirostra
- Erectocephalus
- Eremithyris
- Eremotoechia
- Eremotrema
- Ericiatia
- Eridmatus
- Eridorthis
- Erinostrophia
- Eripnifera
- Erismatina
- Eristenosia
- Ernogia
- Errhynx
- **Erymnia**
- Erymnaria
- Esilia
- Espella
- Estlandia
- Estonirhynchia
- Etheridgina
- Etymothyris
- **Eucalathis**
- Eucharitina
- Eudesella
- Eudesia
- Eudesites
- Eudoxina
- Euidothyris
- Eumetabolotoechia
- Eumetria
- Euorthisina
- Euractinella
- Eurekaspirifer
- Euroatrypa
- Eurorthisina
- Eurycolporhynchus
- Eurypthyris
- Eurysina
- Eurysites
- Eurysoria
- Euryspirifer
- Eurythyris
- Eurytreta
- Euxinella
- Evagyrotheca
- Evanescirostrum
- Evanidisinurostrum
- Evenkina
- Evenkinorthis
- Evenkorhynchia
- Exatrypa
- Excavatorhynchia
- Exceptothyris
- Expellobolus
- Experilingula

== F ==
- Faksethyris
- Falafer
- Falciferula
- **Fallax**
- Fallaxispirifer
- Fallaxoproductus
- Falsatrypa
- Famatinorthis
- Fanichonetes
- Fardenia
- Fascicoma
- Fascicosta
- Fascicostella
- Fasciculina
- Fascifera
- Fascistropheodonta
- Fascizetina
- Fehamya
- Felinotoechia
- Fenestrirostra
- Fengzuella
- Fenxiangella
- Ferganella
- Ferganoproductus
- Fernglenia
- Ferrax
- Ferrobolus
- Ferrythyris
- Fezzanoglossa
- Ffynnonia
- Fibulistrophia
- Fidespirifer
- Filiatrypa
- Filiconcha
- Filigreenia
- Fimbriaria
- Fimbrinia
- Fimbriothyris
- Fimbrispirifer
- Finkelnburgia
- Finospirifer
- Fissirhynchia
- Fistulogonites
- Fitzroyella
- Flabellirhynchia
- Flabellitesia
- Flabellocyrtia
- Flabellothyris
- Flabellulirostrum
- Flectcherithyris
- Fletcherina
- Fletcherithyroides
- Flexaria
- Flexathyris
- Floweria
- Fluctuaria
- Foliomena
- Fordinia
- Formosarhynchia
- Fortunella
- **Fosteria**
- Fossatrypa
- Foveola
- Frankiella
- Frechella
- Fredericksia
- Frenula
- **Frenulina**
- **Frieleia**
- Fulcriphoria
- Furcirhynchia
- Furcitella
- Fusella
- Fusichonetes
- Fusiproductus
- Fusirhynchia
- Fusispirifer

== G ==
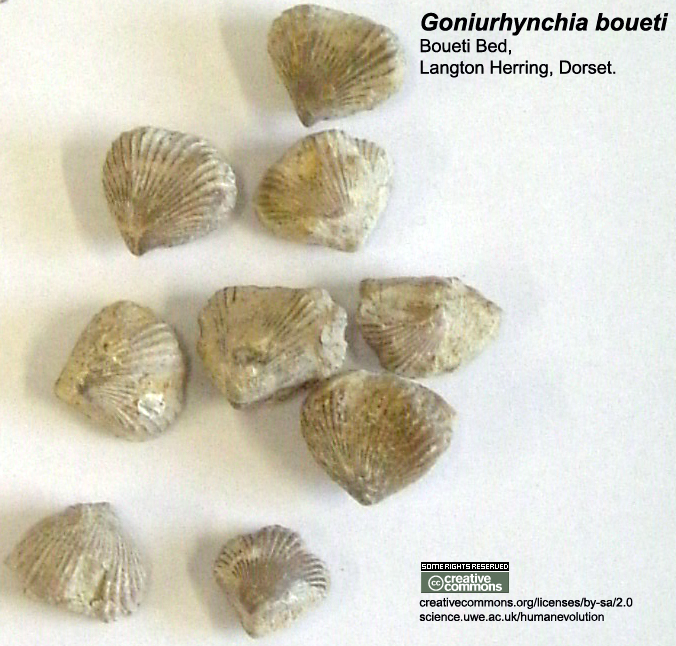
Goniorhynchia boueti

- Gacella
- Gacina
- Galataestrophia
- Galeatathyris
- Galeatella
- Galeatellina
- Galeoatagypa
- Galliennithyris
- Gamonetes
- Gamphalosia
- Gasconsia
- Gashaomiaoia
- Gastrodetoechia
- Gefonia
- Gegenella
- Gelidorthidina
- Gelidorthis
- Gemerithyris
- Gemmarcula
- Gemmellaroia
- Gemmellaroialla
- Gemmulicosta
- Geniculifera
- Geniculigypa
- Geniculina
- Geniculomclearnites
- Georgethyris
- Geranocephalus
- Gerassimovia
- Gerkispira
- Gerolsteinites
- Gerothyris
- Gerrhynx
- Geyerella
- Gibberostrophia
- Gibbirhynchia
- Gibbithyris
- Gibbochonetes
- Gibbospirifer
- Gigantoproductus
- Gigantorhynchus
- Gigantothyris
- Gilledia
- Giraldiella
- Girlasia
- Girtyella
- Gisilina
- Gissarina
- Gjelispinifera
- Glabrichonetina
- **Glaciarcula**
- Gladiostrophia
- Glaphyorthis
- Glassia
- Glassina
- Glazewskia
- Glendonia
- Globatrypa
- Globiella
- Globirhynchia
- Globispirifer
- Globithyris
- Globosobucina
- Globosochonetes
- Globosoproductus
- Globulirhynchia
- Glossella
- Glosseudesia
- Glosshypothyridina
- Glossinotoechia
- Glossinulina
- Glossinulirhynchia
- Glossinulus
- Glossoleptaena
- Glossorthis
- Glossothyropsis
- **Glottidia**
- Glyphisaria
- Glyptacrothrele
- Glyptambonites
- Glypterina
- Glyptias
- Glyptoglossella
- Glyptogypa
- Glyptomena
- Glyptorhynchia
- Glyptoria
- Glyptorthis
- Glyptosteges
- Glyptotrophia
- Glytospirifer
- Gmelinmagas
- Gnathorhynchia
- Goleomixa
- Goliathyris
- Gonambonites
- Gonathyris
- Gondolina
- Goniarina
- **Goniobrochus** (fossil per IRMNG)
- Goniophoria
- Goniorhynchia
- Goniothyris
- Goniothyropsis
- Goniotrema
- Gorgostrophia
- Gorjanskya
- Gorystrophia
- Gotatrypa
- Goungjunspirifer
- Gracianella
- Gracilotoechia
- **Grammetaria**
- Grammoplecia
- Grammorhynchus
- Grandaurispina
- Grandiproductella
- Grandirhynchia
- Grantonia
- Granulirhynchia
- Grasirhynchia
- Grayina
- Greenfieldia
- Grorudia
- Gruenewaldtia
- Grumantia
- Gruntia = Boloria Grunt, 1973 (preoccupied)
- Gruntallina
- **Gryphus**
- Guangdangina
- Guangjiayanella
- Guangshunia
- Guangxiispirifer
- Guaxa
- Gubleria
- Guicyrtia
- Guilinospirifer
- Guistrophia
- Guizhovella
- Gunnarella
- Gunningblandella
- Gusarella
- Guttasella
- **Gwynia**
- Gwyniella
- Gypidula
- Gypidulella
- Gypidulina
- Gypiduloides
- Gypospirifer
- Gyroselenella
- Gyrosina
- Gyrosoria
- **Gyrothyris**

== H ==
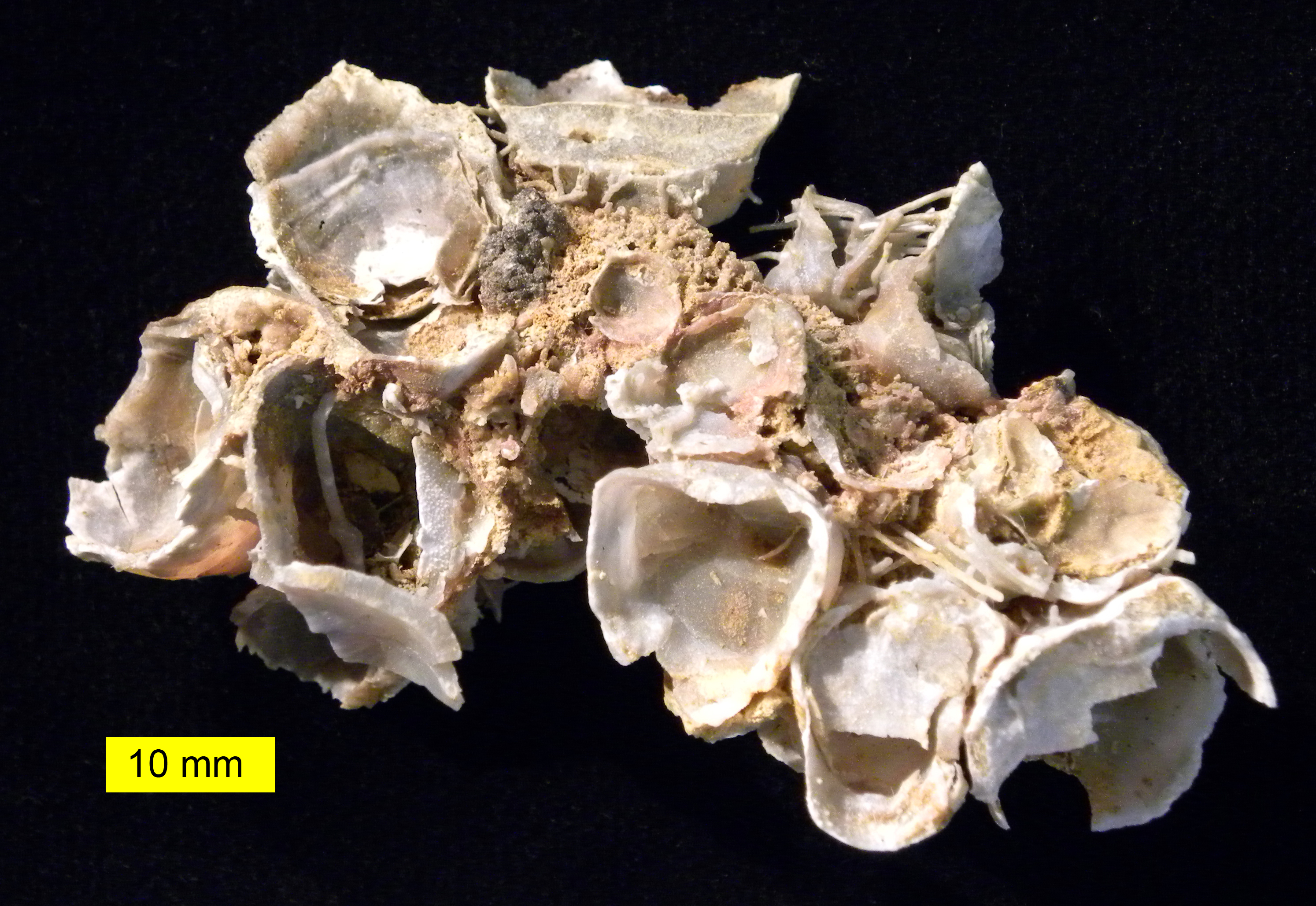
Hercosestria cribrosa Cooper & Grant 1969 (Roadian, Guadalupian, Middle Permian); Glass Mountains, Texas.

- Habrobrochus
- Hadrorhynchia
- Hadrosia
- Hadrotorhynchus
- Hadrotreta
- Hadyrhyncha
- Hagabirhynchia
- Hallina
- Hallinetes
- Halorella
- Halorellina
- Halorelloidea
- Hamburgia
- Hamlingella
- Hamptonina
- Hanaeproductus
- Hansotreta
- Hanusatrypa
- Haplospirifer
- Harknessella
- Harmatosia
- Harpidium
- Harttella
- Haupiria
- Havlicekella
- Havlicekia
- Haydenella
- Haydenoides
- Hebertella
- Hebetoechia
- Hedeina
- Hedeinopsis
- Hedstroemina
- Heimia
- Helaspis
- Helenathyris
- Heleniproductus
- Heligothyris
- Helmersenia
- Helvetella
- Hemichonetes
- Hemileurus
- Hemiplethorhynchus
- Hemipronites
- Hemiptychina
- Hemistringocephalus
- **Hemithiris**
- Hemithyropsis
- Hemitoechia
- Heosomocelypha
- Herangirhynchia
- Herbertella
- Hercosestria
- Hercosia
- Hercostrophia
- Hercothyris
- Hergetatrypa
- Hesperinia
- Hesperithyris
- Hesperomena
- Hesperonomia
- Hesperonomiella
- Hesperorhynchia
- Hesperorthis
- Hesperosia
- Hesperotrophia
- Hessenhausia
- Heteralosia
- Heteraria
- Heterelasma
- Heterobrochus
- Heteromychus
- Heterorthella
- Heterorthina
- Heterorthis
- Hibernodonta
- Himalairhynchia
- Himathyris
- Hindella
- Hinganella
- Hingganoleptaena
- Hipparionix
- Hircinisca
- Hirnantia
- Hirsutella
- Hiscobeccus
- Hisingerella
- **Hispanirhynchia**
- Hispidaria
- Histosyrinx
- Holcorhynchella
- Holcorhynchia
- Holcospirifer
- Holcothyris
- Hollardiella
- Hollardina
- **Holobrachia**
- Holorhynchus
- Holosia
- Holotricharina
- Holtedahlina
- Holynatrypa
- Holynetes
- Homaliarhynchia
- Homeocardiorhynchus
- Homeorhynchia
- Homevalaria
- Homoeospira
- Homoeospirella
- Homotreta
- Hontorialosia
- Horderleyella
- Horridonia
- Hoskingia
- Hostimex
- Howellella
- Howellites
- Howelloidea
- Howittia
- Howseia
- Huatangia
- Hubeiproductus
- Huenella
- Huenellina
- Hulterstadia
- Humaella
- Hunanochonetes
- Hunanoproductus
- Hungarispira
- Hungaritheca
- Hustedia
- Hustedtiella
- Hyattidina
- Hyborhynchella
- Hybostenoscisma
- Hybostenoscisma
- Hynniphoria
- Hyperobolus
- Hypoleiorhynchus
- Hypolinoproductus
- Hyponeatrypa
- Hypopsia
- Hypothyridina
- Hypselonetes
- Hypseloterorhynchus
- Hypsiptycha
- Hypsomyonia
- Hysterohowellella
- Hysterolites
- Hystriculina

== I ==
- Iberirhynchia
- Iberithyris
- Idioglyptus
- Idiorthis
- Idiospira
- Idiostrophia
- Iheringithyris
- Ikella
- Iliella
- Ilmarinia
- Ilmenia
- Ilmeniopsis
- Ilmenispina
- Ilmospirifer
- Ilyinella
- Imacanthyris
- Imbrexia
- Imbricatia
- Imbricatospira
- Imdentistella
- Impiacus
- Implexina
- Inaequalis
- Incisius
- Incorthis
- Independatrypa
- Indigia
- Indorhynchia
- Indospirifer
- Inflatia
- Infurca
- Ingria
- Iniathyris
- Iniproductus
- Innaechia
- Innuitella
- Inopinatarcula
- Insignitisinurostrum
- Institella
- Institifera
- Institina
- Inversella
- Inversithyris
- Invertina
- Invertrypa
- Iotina
- Iowarhynchus
- Iowatrypa
- Ipherron
- Irboskites
- Irenothyris
- Irgislella
- Irhirea
- Iridostrophia
- Iru
- Ishimia
- Isjuminelina
- Isjuminella
- Ismenia
- Isochonetes
- Isocrania
- Isogramma
- Isophragma
- Isopoma
- Isorthis
- Isospinatrypa
- Isovella
- Israelaria
- Issedonia
- Isumithyris
- Ivanothyris
- Ivanoviella
- Ivdelinella
- Ivdelinia
- Ivshinella
- Iwaispirifer

== J ==
- Jaanussonites
- **Jaffaia**
- Jaisalmeria
- Jakutella
- Jakutochonetes
- Jakutoproductus
- Jakutostrophia
- Jamesella
- Janiceps
- Janiomya
- Janius
- Japanithyris
- Jarovathyris
- Jercia
- Jevinellina
- Jezercia
- Jiangdaspirifer
- Jielingia
- Jiguliconcha
- Jilinia
- Jilinmartinia
- Jilinospirifer
- Jipuproductus
- Jisuina
- Jivinella
- **Joania**
- Johnsonathyris
- Johnsonetes
- Johnsoniatrypa
- **Jolonica**
- Jolvia
- Jonesea
- Joviatrypa
- Juralina
- Juresania
- Juvavella
- Juvavellina

== K ==
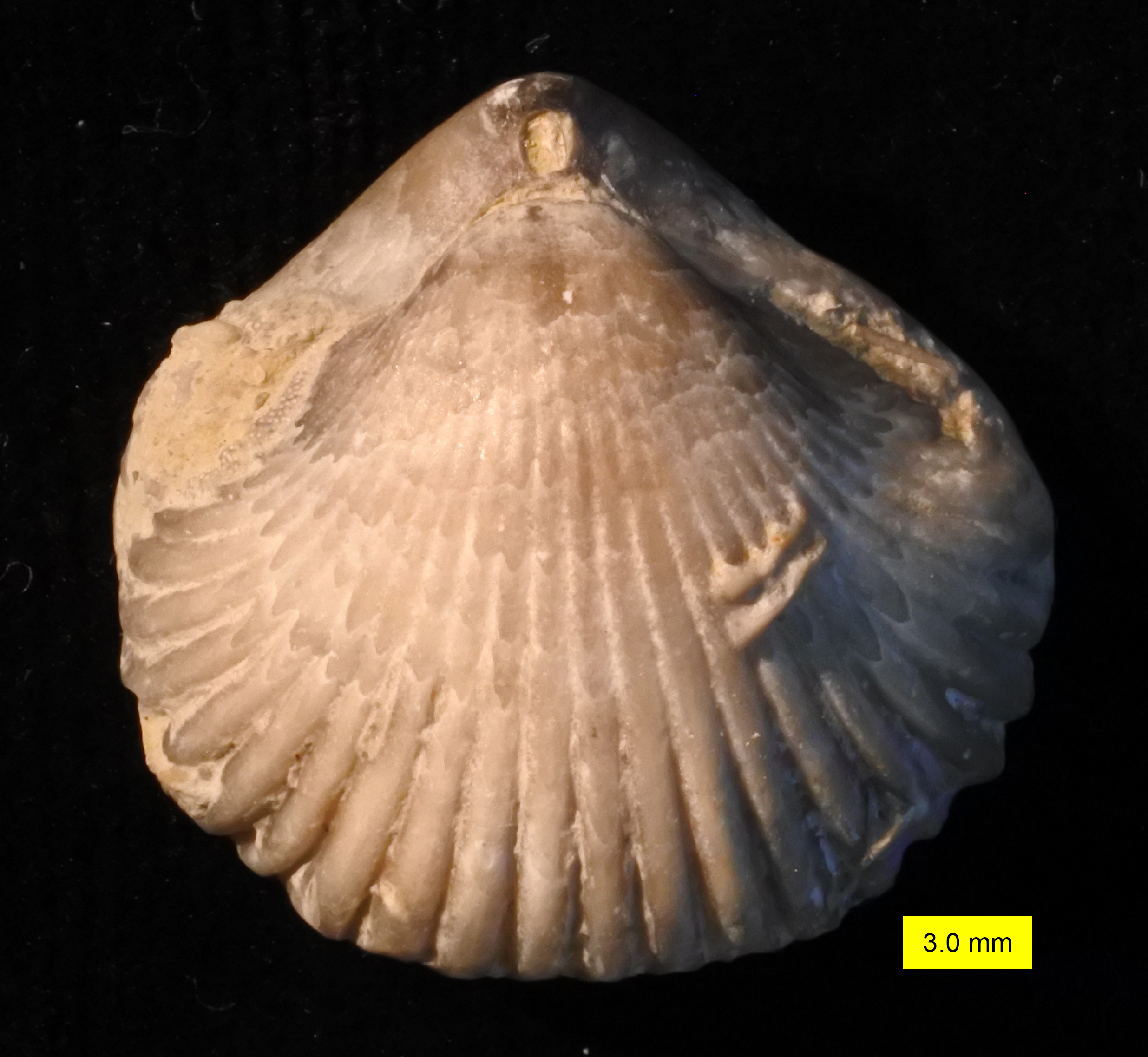
Kutchirhynchia morieri, Luc-sur-Mer, France, Middle Jurassic (Upper Bathonian), dorsal view.

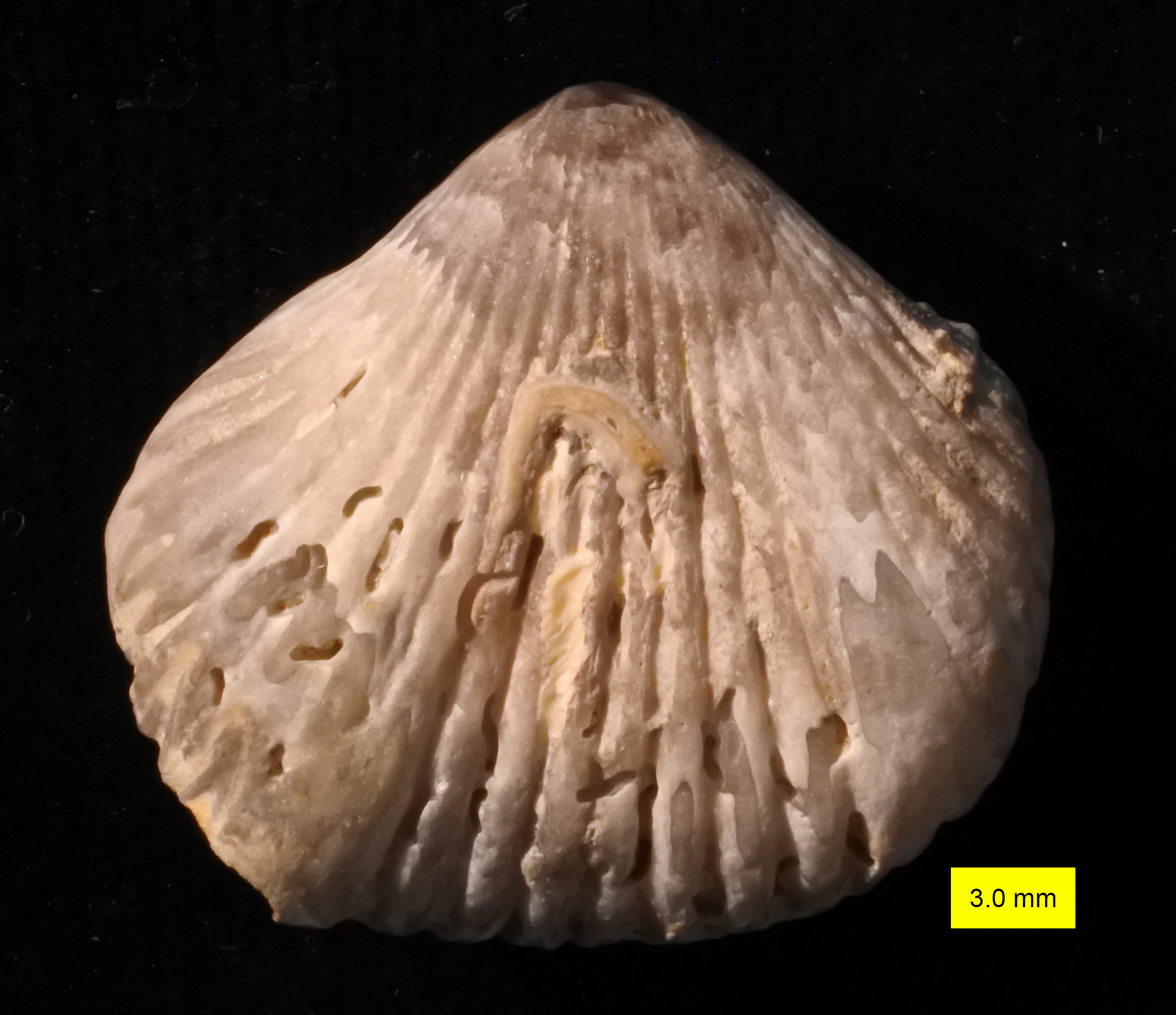
Kutchirhynchia morieri, Luc-sur-Mer, France, Middle Jurassic (Upper Bathonian), ventral view.

- Kabanoviella
- Kachathyris
- Kadraliproductus
- Kajnaria
- **Kakanuiella**
- Kalitvella
- Kallirhynchia
- Kamoica
- Kampella
- **Kanakythyris**
- Kaninospirifer
- Kansuella
- Kaplex
- Kaplicona
- Karadagella
- Karadagithyris
- Karakulina
- Karathele
- Karavankina
- Karbous
- Karlicium
- Karnotreta
- Karpatiella
- Karpinskia
- Kasakhstania
- Kasetia
- Kassinella
- Katastrophomena
- Katunia
- Kavesia
- Kawhiarhynchia
- Kayserella
- Kayseria
- Kedrpvpthyris
- Kelamelia
- Kelusia
- Kendzhilgithyris
- Kentronetes
- Keokukia
- Keratothyris
- Kericserella
- Kerpina
- Keyserlingia
- Keyserlingina
- Khangaestrophia
- Khasaghia
- Khasagtina
- Khinganospirifer
- Khodalevichia
- Kholbotchonia
- Kiaeromena
- Kiangsiella
- Kikaithyris
- Kimatothyris
- Kindleina
- Kinelina
- Kingena
- Kingenella
- Kinghiria
- Kinnella
- Kintathyris
- Kirkidium
- Kirkina
- Kisilia
- Kitakamithyris
- Kjaerina
- Kjerulfina
- Kleithriatreta
- Klipsteinella
- Klipsteinelloidea
- Klukatrypa
- Kochiproductus
- Koeveskallina
- Koigia
- Kokomerena
- Kolihium
- Kolymithyris
- Komiella
- Komispirifer
- Komukia
- Koninckella
- Koninckina
- Koninckodonta
- Konstantia
- Korjakirhynchia
- Kosirium
- Kosoidea
- Kotlaia
- Kotujella
- Kotujotreta
- Kotylotreta
- Kotysex
- Kozhuchinella
- Kozlenia
- Kozlowskia
- Kozlowskiellina
- Kozlowskites
- Kransia
- Krattorthis
- **Kraussina**
- Krejcigrafella
- Krimargyrotheca
- Kritorhynchia
- Krizistrophia
- Krotovia
- Kueichowella
- Kullervo
- Kulumbella
- Kumbella
- Kundatella
- Kungaella
- Kunlunia
- Kurakithyris
- Kurtomarginifera
- Kurzgunia
- Kutchirhynchia
- Kutchithyris
- Kutorgina
- Kutorginella
- Kuvelousia
- Kvesanirhynchia
- Kwangsia
- Kwangsirhynchus
- Kymatothyris
- Kyrshabaktella
- Kyrtatrypa

== L ==
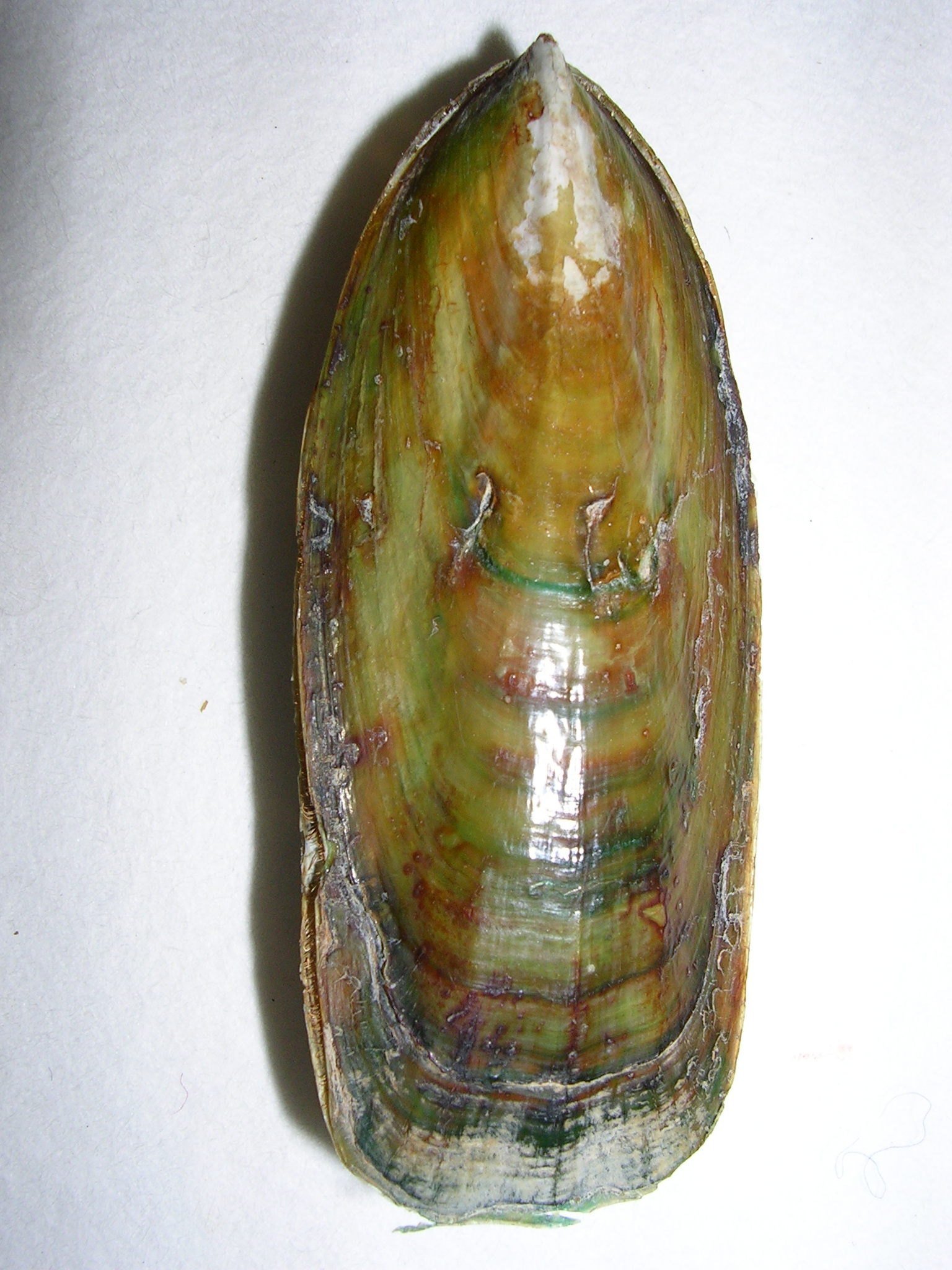
Lingula, known since the Cambrian

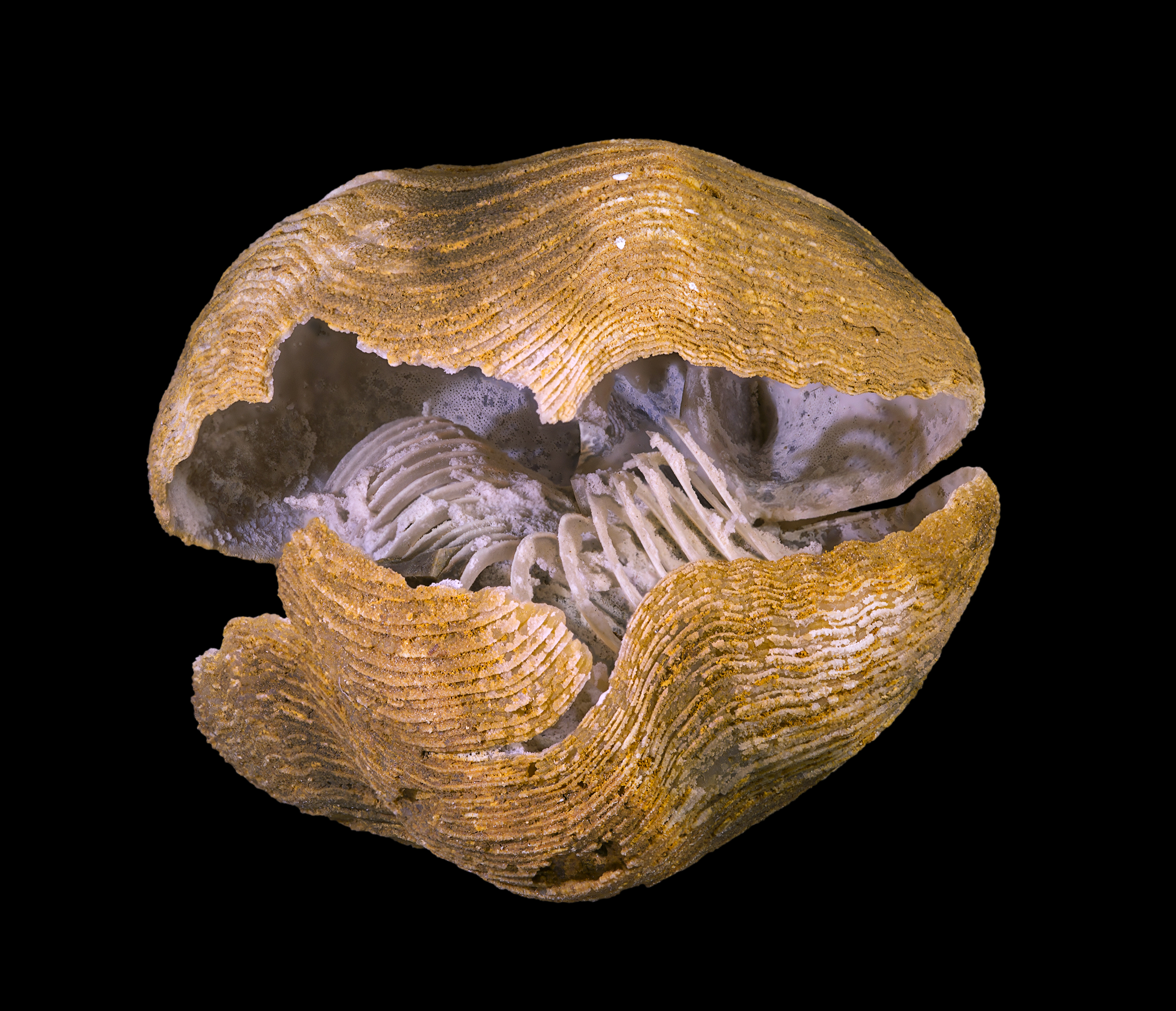
Liospiriferina rostrata, contemporary

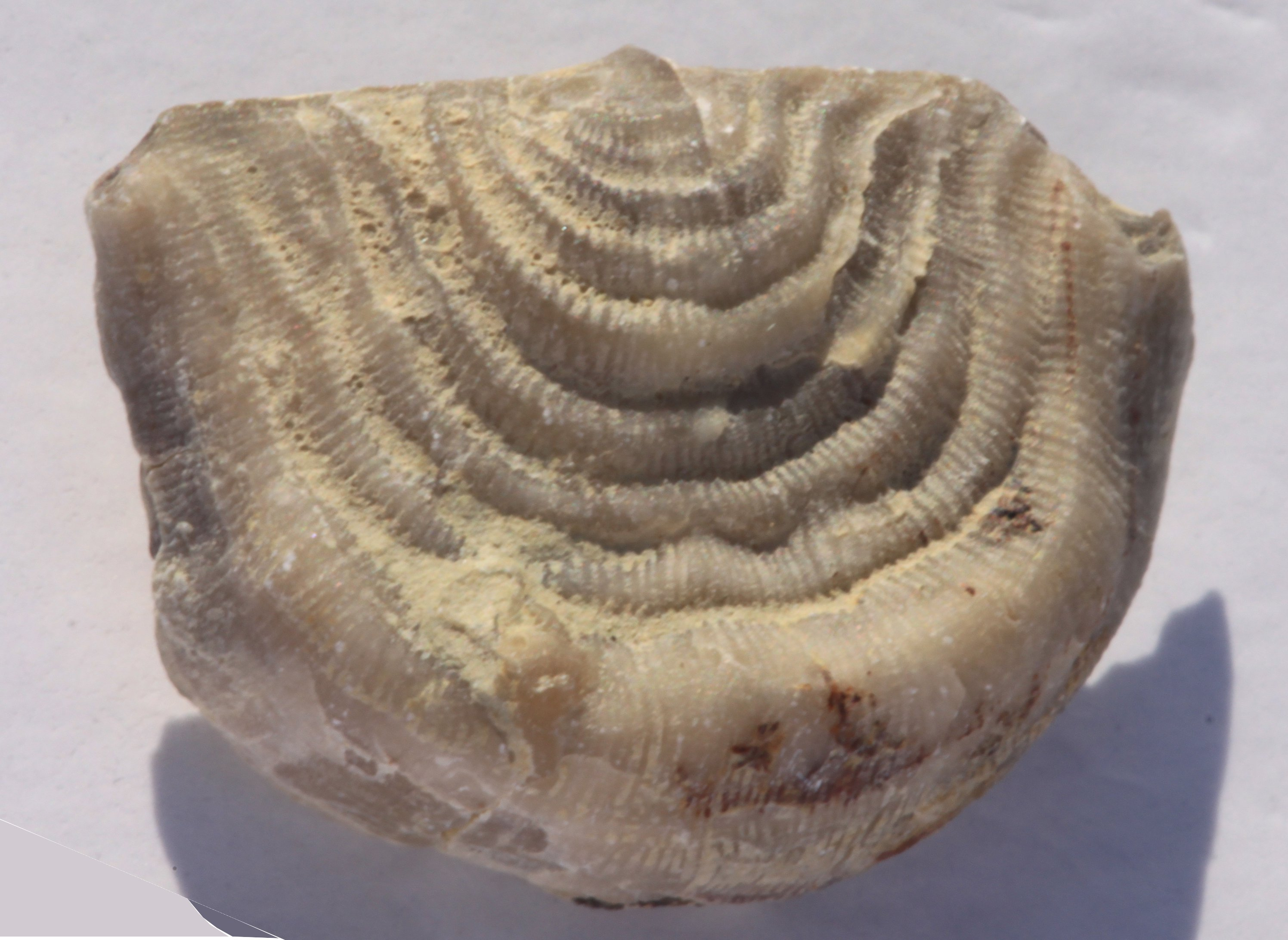
Leptaena romboidalis, pedunculate valve, Middle Silurian
- Labaia
- Laballa
- Labriproductus
- **Lacazella**
- Lachrymula
- Lacunaerhynchia
- Lacunarites
- Lacunites
- Lacunosella
- Ladjia
- Ladogia
- Ladogiella
- Ladogifornix
- Ladogilina
- Ladogilinella
- Ladogiodes
- Laevicyphomena
- Laevigaterhynchia
- Laevirhynchia
- Laevispirifer
- Laevithyris
- Laevorhynchia
- Laima
- Laioporella
- Lamanskya
- Lambdarina
- Lamcispinifera
- Lamellaerhynchia
- Lamelliconchidium
- Lamellokoninckina
- Lamellosathyris
- Lamellosia
- Laminatia
- Lamnaespina
- Lamnimargus
- Lampangella
- Lanceomyonia
- Lanchangjiangia
- Langella
- Langkawai (?)
- Langshanthyris
- Lanipustula
- Laosia
- Lapasnia
- Lapradella
- **Laqueus**
- Larispirifer
- Larium
- Lateralatirostrum
- Laterispina
- Lathamella
- Laticrura
- Latiflexa
- Latiplecus
- Latiproductus
- Latirhynchia
- Latispirifer
- Latonotoechia
- Lazella
- Lazithyris
- Lazutkinia
- Leangella
- Lebediorthis
- Leiochonetes
- Leiolepismatina
- Leioproductus
- Leiorhynchoidea
- Leiorhynchoides
- Leiorhynchus
- Leioria
- Leioseptathyris
- Leiothyridina
- Lenatoechia
- Lenothyris
- Lenzia
- Leontiella
- Lepidocrania
- Lepidocycloides
- Lepidocyclus
- Lepidoleptaena
- Lepidomena
- Lepidorhynchia
- Lepidorthis
- Lepidospirifer
- Lepismatina
- Leptaena
- Leptaenisca
- Leptaenoidia
- Leptaenomenclax
- Leptaenopoma
- Leptaenopyxis
- Leptagonia
- Leptalosia
- Leptathyris
- Leptella
- Leptellina
- Leptelloidea
- Leptembolon
- Leptestia
- Leptestiina
- Leptobolus
- Leptocaryorhyncus
- Leptochonetes
- Leptocoelia
- Leptocoelina
- Leptodonta
- Leptodontella
- Leptodus
- Leptoskelidion
- Leptospira
- Leptostrophia
- Leptostrophiella
- **Leptothyrella**
- Leptothyrellopsis
- Lercarella
- Lethamia
- Leurosina
- Levenea
- Levibiseptum
- Leviconchidiella
- Levigatella
- Levipugnax
- Levipustula
- Levispira
- Levitusia
- Lialosia
- Libyaeglossa
- Libyaerhynchus
- Licharewia
- Lichnatrypa
- Lievinella
- Liljevallia
- Limbatrypa
- Limbella
- Limbifera
- Limbimurina
- Limstrophina
- Lindinella
- Lindstroemella
- Lingatrypa
- Lingshanella
- Linguithyris
- **Lingula**
- Lingulapholis
- Lingularia
- Lingulasma
- Lingulella
- Lingulellotreta
- Lingulepis
- Lingulipora
- Lingulobolus
- Lingulodiscina
- Lingulops
- Linguopugnoides
- Linnarssonella
- Linnarssonia
- Linoporella
- Linoproductus
- Linoprotonia
- Linostrophomena
- Linterella
- Linxiangxiella
- Liocoelia
- Lioleptaena
- Liorhynchus
- Liosotella
- **Liospiriferina** (fossil per IRMNG)
- Liostrophia
- **Liothyrella**
- Lipanteris
- Liramia
- Liraplecta
- Liraria
- Liraspirifer
- Lirellaria
- Lirellarina
- Liricamera
- Liriplica
- Lissajousithyris
- Lissatrypa
- Lissatrypella
- Lissatrypoidea
- Lissella
- Lissidium
- Lissochonetes
- Lissocoelina
- Lissoleptaena
- Lissomarginifera
- Lissopleura
- Lissorhynchia
- Lissosia
- Lissostrophia
- Lissothyris
- Lissotreta
- Litocothia
- Litothyris
- Liveringia
- Lixatrypa
- Ljaschenkovia
- Ljudmilispirifer
- Llanoella
- Loboidothyris
- Loboidothyropsis
- Loborina
- Lobothyris
- Lobothyroides
- Lochkothele
- Loczyella
- Loenthyris
- Loganella
- Loilemia
- Lokutella
- Lomatiphora
- Lomatorthis
- Longdongshuia
- Longispina
- Longithyris
- Longxianirhynchia
- Lopasnia
- Loperia
- Lophrothyris
- Lopingia
- Lorangerella
- Lordorthis
- Loreleiella
- Loriolithyris
- Losvia
- Lotharingella
- Lowenstamia
- Loxophragmus
- Luanquella
- Ludfordina
- Luhaia
- Luhotreta
- Lunaria
- Lunoglossa
- Lunpolia
- Luofuia
- Lurgiticoma
- Luterella
- Lutetiarcula
- Lychnothyris
- Lycophoria
- Lyonia
- Lysidium
- Lysigypa
- Lyttonia

== M ==
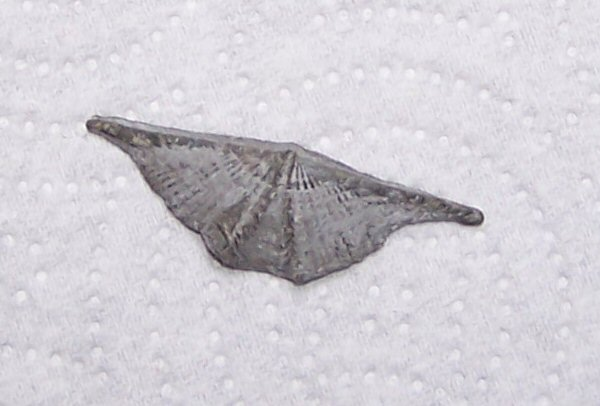
Mucrospirifer sp.

- Maakina
- Mabella
- **Macandrevia**
- Machaeraria
- Machaerocolella
- Machaerotoechia
- Mackerrovia
- Maclarenella
- Macrocoelia
- Macropleura
- Macropotamorhynchus
- Madarosia
- Madoia
- Maemia
- Magadania
- Magadina
- **Magadinella**
- Magas
- Magasella
- Magella
- **Magellania**
- Magharithyris
- Magicostrophia
- Magnicanalis
- Magniplicatina
- Magniventra
- Magnumbonella
- Majkopella
- Makridinirhynchia
- Malayanoplia
- Malinella
- Malleia
- Malloproductus
- Maltaia
- Malurostrophia
- Malwirhynchia
- Mametothyris
- Mamutinetes
- Manespira
- **Manithyris**
- Mangkeluia
- Manosia
- Mansina
- Maorielasma
- Maorirhynchia
- Maoristrophia
- Mapingtichia
- Marcharella
- Margaritiproductus
- Marginalosia
- Marginatia
- Marginicinctus
- Marginifera
- Marginirugus
- Marginoproductus
- Marginorthis
- Marginovatia
- Mariannaella
- Marinurnula
- Marionites
- Maritimithyris
- Markamia
- Markitoechia
- Marklandella
- Martinia
- Martiniella
- Martiniopsis
- Martinothyris
- Matanoleptodus
- Matutella
- Mauispirifer
- Maxillirhynchia
- Mayaothyris
- Maydenella
- Mcewanella
- Mclearnites
- Mclearnitesella
- Medessia
- Mediospirifer
- Mediterranirhynchia
- Meekella
- Megachonetes
- Megaderbyia
- Megakozlowskiella
- Megalosia
- Megamyonia
- Meganterella
- Meganteris
- Megaplectatrypa
- Megapleuronia
- Megasalopina
- Megaspinochonetes
- Megasteges
- Megastrophia
- Megastropiella
- **Megathyris**
- Megatschernyschewia
- **Megerlia**
- **Megerlina**
- Meglopterorhynchus
- Megousia
- Megumatrypa
- Meifodia
- **Melvicalathis**
- Mendacella
- Mendathyris
- Mennespirifer
- Mentzelia
- Mentzelioides
- Mentzeliopsis
- Meonia
- Merciella
- Merista
- Meristella
- Meristelloides
- Meristina
- Meristorygma
- Meristospira
- Merophricus
- Merospirifer
- Mesocrania
- Mesodouvillina
- Mesoleptostrophia
- Mesolissostrophia
- Mesolobus
- Mesonomia
- Mesopholidostrophia
- Mesoplica
- Mesotreta
- Metabolipa
- Metacamarella
- Metaplasia
- Metathyrisina
- Metorthis
- Metriolepis
- Mexicaria
- Mezounia
- Miaohuangrhynchus
- Micella
- Micidus
- Mickwitzia
- Micraphelia
- Microcardinalia
- Micromitra
- Microrhynchia
- Microsphaeridiorhynchus
- Microtrypa
- Mictospirifer
- Millythyris
- Mimaria
- Mimella
- Mimikonstantia
- Mimorina
- Minatrypa
- Mingenewia
- Miniprokopia
- Minispina
- Minithyris
- Minororthis
- Minutalirhynchia
- **Minutella** (fossil per IRMNG)
- Minutostropheodonta
- Minysphenia
- Minythyra
- Miogryphus
- Mirifusella
- Mirilingula
- Mirisquamea
- Mirorthis
- Misolia
- Mistproductus
- Mitchellella
- Miyakothyris
- Mjoesina
- Moderatoproductus
- Modestella
- Moeschia
- Mogoktella
- Mogoliella
- Moisseievia
- Molongcola
- Molongella
- Molongia
- Monadotoechia
- Monelasmina
- Mongoliella
- Mongoliopsis
- Mongolirhynchia
- Mongolorhynx
- Mongolosia
- Mongolospira
- Monobolina
- Monoconvexa
- Monomerella
- Monorthis
- Monsardithyris
- Montanella
- Monticlarella
- Monticulifera
- Montsenetes
- Moorefieldella
- Moorelina
- Moorellina
- Moquellina
- Moraviaturia
- Moravilla
- Moravostrophia
- Morganella
- Morinorhynchus
- Morphorhynchus
- Morrisithyris
- Mosquella
- Moumina
- Moutonithyris
- Mucrospirifer
- Mucrospiriferinella
- Muirwoodella
- Muirwoodia
- Multicorhynchia
- Multicostella
- Multiridgia
- Multispinula
- Multispirifer
- Munhella
- Munieratrypa
- Muriferella
- Murihikurhynchia
- Murinella
- Murjukiana
- **Murravia**
- Musculina
- Mutationella
- Mycerosia
- Mylloconotreta
- Myodethyrium
- Myopugnax
- Myotreta
- Myriospirifer
- Myrmirhynx
- Mystrophora

== N ==
- Nabarredia
- Nabiaoia
- Nadiastrophia
- Nahoniella
- Najadospirifer
- Najdinothyris
- Nakazatothyris
- Nalivkinaria
- Nalivkinia
- Nalivkiniella = Ala Nalivkin, 1979 (preoccupied)
- **Nanacalathis**
- Nanambonites
- Nanatrypa
- Nannirhynchia
- Nanorthis
- Nanospira
- Nanothyris
- Nantanella
- Nanukidium
- Naradanithyris
- Narynella
- Nasonirhynchia
- Nastosia
- Naukat
- Navispira
- Nayunnella
- Neatrypa
- Nebenothyris
- Negramithyris
- Neimongolella
- Nekhoroshevia
- Nekvasiloveia
- Nekvasilovella
- Nematocrania
- Nemesa
- **Neoaemula** (fossil per IRMNG)
- **Neoancistrocrania**
- Neobolus
- Neobouchardia
- Neochonetes
- Neocirpa
- Neocoelia
- Neocramatia
- Neocyrtina
- Neodelthyris
- Neofascicosta
- Neoglobithyris
- Neogypidula
- Neokarpinskia
- Neokjaerina
- Neoliothyrina
- Neometabolipa
- Neopaulinella = Paulinella Boucot & Racheboeuf, 1987 (preoccupied)
- Neophricadothyris
- Neoplicatifera
- Neoretzia
- **Neorhynchia**
- Neorhynchula
- Neosandia = Sandia Sutherland & Harlow, 1973 (preoccupied)
- Neoschizophoria
- Neospirifer
- Neospirigerina
- Neostrophia
- Neothecidella
- **Neothyris**
- Neotreta
- Neowellerella
- Neoyanguania
- Nepasitoechia
- Nereidella
- Nerthebrochus
- Nervostrophia
- Neumanella
- Neumania
- Neumayrithyris
- Newberria
- Nicolella
- Nicoloidea
- Nicolorthis
- Nigerinoplica
- Nikiforovaena
- Nikolaevirhynchus
- Ningbingella
- Ninglongothyris
- Niorhynx
- Nipponirhynchia
- **Nipponithyris**
- Nisusia
- Niutoushania
- Niviconia
- Nix
- Nochoroiella
- Nocturneilla
- Nodaea
- Nodella
- Noetlingia
- Nordathyris
- Nordella
- Nordispirifer
- Nordotoechia
- Norella
- Notanoplia
- Nothokuvelousia
- Nothopindax
- Nothorthis
- Notiobolus
- Notiochonetes
- Notoconchidium
- Notoleptaena
- Notolosia
- Notoparmella
- Notorthisina
- **Notosaria**
- Notoscaphidia
- Notosia
- Notospirifer
- Notostrophia
- Notothyrina
- Notothyris
- **Notozyga**
- Novellinetes
- **Novocrania**
- Novozemelia
- Nubialba
- Nucleata
- Nucleatina
- Nucleatula
- Nucleorhynchia
- Nucleospira
- Nucleusorhynchia
- Nudauris
- Nudirostralina
- Nudispiriferina
- Nudymia
- Nugnecella
- Nuguschella
- Numericoma
- Nurataella
- Nuria
- Nurochonetes
- Nushbiella
- Nyalamurhynchia
- Nyege
- Nymphorhynchia

== O ==
- Oanduporella
- Obesaria
- Oblongarcula
- Obnixia
- Obolella
- Obolopsis
- Obolorugia
- Obolus
- Obovothyris
- Obsoletirhynchia
- Obturamentella
- **Oceanithyris**
- Ochotathyris
- Ochotorhynchia
- Ocnerorthis
- Ocorthis
- Odarovithyris
- Odontospirifer
- Odoratus
- Oehlertella
- Oepikina
- Oepikinella
- Oepikites
- Ogbinia
- Ogilviella
- Oglu
- Oglupes
- Ogmoplecia
- Ogmusia
- Oina
- Oiosia
- Okathyris
- Oldhamina
- Oldhaminella
- Oleneothyris
- Olentotreta
- Oleorthis
- Olgerdia
- Oligomys
- Oligoptycherhynchus
- Oligorachis
- Oligorhynchia
- Oligorhytisia
- Oligorthis
- Oligothyrina
- Ombonia
- Omnutakhella
- Omolonella
- Omolonia
- Omolonorhynchia
- Omolonothyris
- Onavia
- Oncosarina
- Onniella
- Onnizetina
- Onopordumaria
- Onugorhynchia
- Onychoplecia
- Onychotreta
- Opikella
- Opisconidion
- Opisthotreta
- Opsiconidion
- Orbicoelia
- Orbiculatisiurostrum
- Orbiculoidea
- Orbiculopora
- Orbiculothyris
- Orbinaria
- Orbirhynchia
- Orbithele
- Orenburgella
- Oriensellina
- Orientospira
- Orientospirifer
- Orientothyris
- Origostrophia
- Oriskania
- Orlovirhynchia
- Ornatothyrella
- Ornatothyris
- Ornithella
- Ornithothyris
- Ornothyrella
- Orthambonites
- Orthidiella
- Orthidium
- Orthiella
- Orthis
- Orthisocrania
- Orthocarina
- Ortholina
- Orthopleura
- Orthorhynchuloides
- Orthorhyncula
- Orthospirifer
- Orthostrophella
- Orthostrophia
- Orthotetella
- Orthotetes
- Orthotetoides
- Orthothetina
- Orthothrix
- Orthothyris
- Orthotichia
- Orthotoma
- Orthotropia
- Orulgania
- Orusia
- Oslogonites
- Osmarella
- **Ospreyella**
- Otariella
- Otarorhynchia
- Otospirifer
- Ottadalenites
- Otusia
- Ovalospira
- Ovatathyris
- Ovatia
- Overtonia
- Overtoniina
- Ovidiella
- Ovlatchania
- Owenirhynchia
- Oxlosia
- Oxoplecia
- Oxycolpella
- Oxypleurorhynchia
- Ozora

== P ==
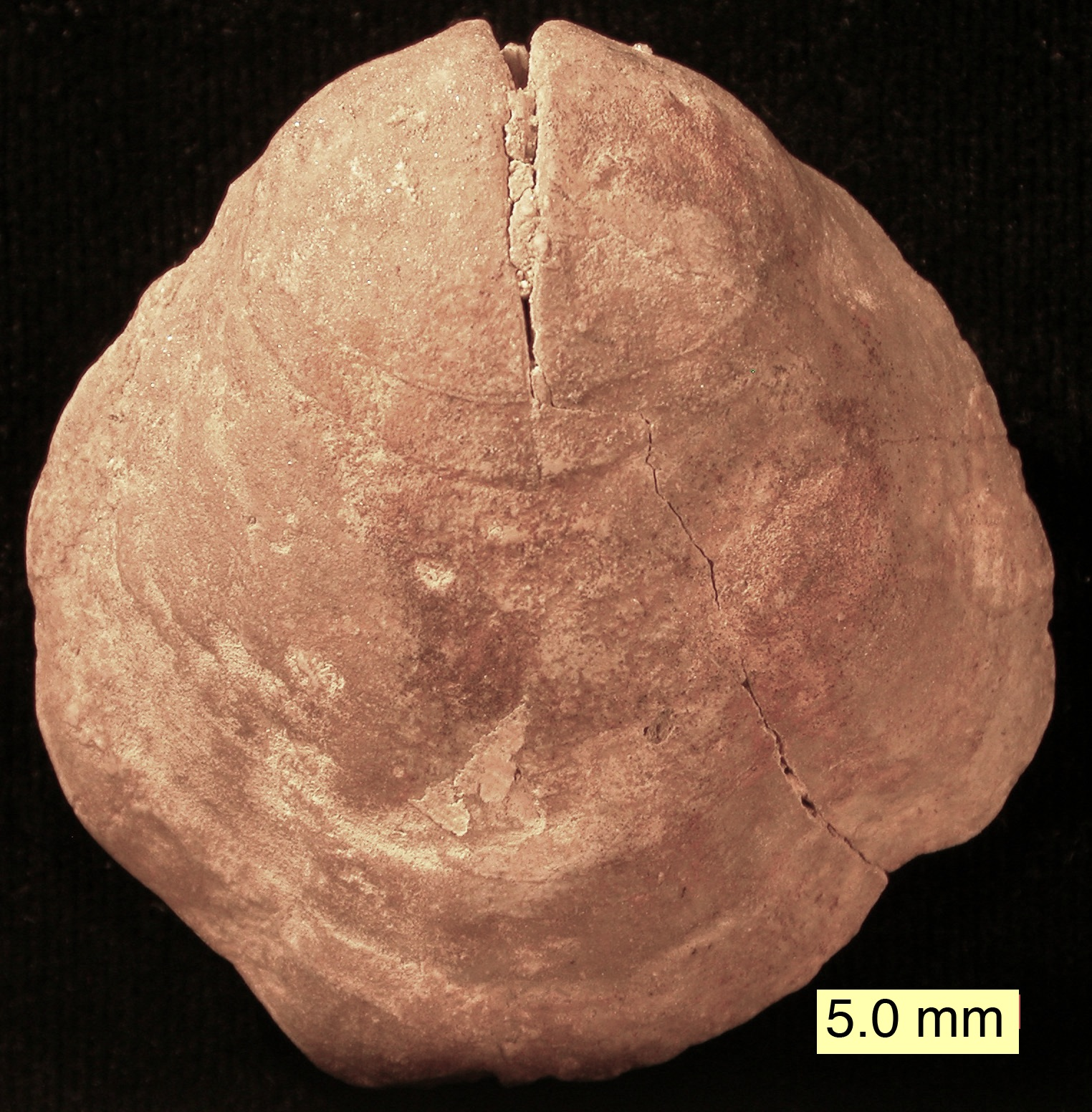
Pentamerus sp., Silurian

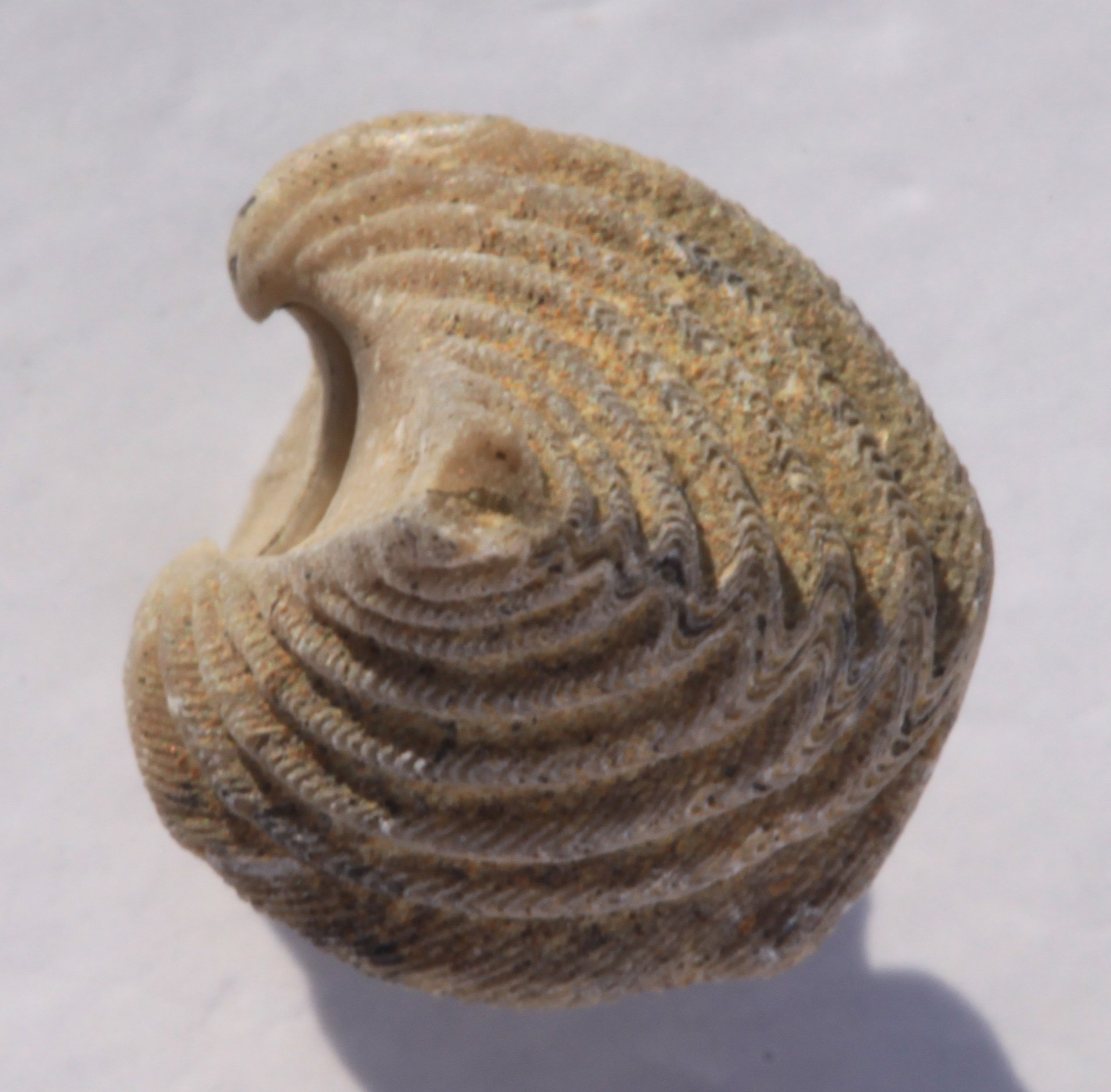
Punctospirifer kentuckyensis, Carboniferous (Pennsylvanian)

- Pachancorhynchia
- Pachyglossella
- Pachymagas
- Pachyplax
- Pachythyris
- Pacificocoelia
- Pacymoorellina
- Paeckelmanella
- Pahlenella
- **Pajaudina** (fossil per IRMNG)
- Palaeobolus
- Palaeochoristites
- Palaeoglossa
- Palaeoldhamina
- Palaeoleptostrophia
- Palaeoschizophoria
- Palaeoschmidtites
- Palaeospirifer
- Palaeostrophomena
- Palaeotrimerella
- Paldiskites
- Paleolibys = Libys Massa, Termier & Termier, 1974 (preoccupied)
- Paleopetria = Petria Mendes, 1957 (preoccupied)
- Paleostrophia
- Palmerhytis
- Pamirorhynchia
- Pamirotheca
- Pamirothyris
- Pamirothyropsis
- Pammegetherhynchus
- Pampoecilorhynchus
- Panderina
- Pantellaria
- Papiliolinus
- Papillostrophia
- Papodina
- Paraacanthothyris
- Parabifolium
- Paraboubeithyris
- Parabuxtonia
- Paracapillithyris
- Parachonetella
- Parachonetes
- Parachoristites
- Paracomposita
- Paracostanoplia
- Paracraniops
- Paracrothyris
- Paracrurithyris
- Parademonedys
- Paraderbyia
- Paradinobolus
- Paradolerorthis
- Paradoxothyris
- Paradygella
- Paraemanuella
- Parageyerella
- Paraglossinulus
- Parahemiptychina
- Parajuresania
- Parakansuella
- Parakarpinskia
- **Parakinetica**
- Parakingena
- Paralaballa
- Paralazutkinia
- Paraldingia
- Paralenorthis
- Paralepismatina
- Paraleptodus
- Paraleptostrophia
- Parallelelasma
- Parallelora
- Paralyttonia
- Paramarginatia
- Paramarginifera
- Parameekella
- Paramentzelia
- Paramerista
- Paramesolobus
- Paramonticulifera
- Paramuirwoodia
- Paranaia
- Paranisopleurella
- Paranorella
- Paranorellina
- Parantiptychia
- Paranudirostralina
- Paraoligorhyncha
- Paraonychoplecia
- Paraorthotetina
- Parapholidostrophia
- Paraphorhynchus
- Paraplatythyris
- Paraplicanoplia
- Paraplicatifera
- Parapugnax
- Parapulchratia
- Paraquadrithyris
- Parareticularia
- Pararhactorhynchia
- Pararhipidium
- Pararhynchospirina
- Parasphenarina
- Paraspirifer
- Paraspiriferina
- Parastringocephalus
- Parastrophina
- Parastrophinella
- Parastrophonella
- Parasulcatinella
- Paratetratomia
- Parathecidea
- Parathyridina
- Parathyrisina
- Paratreta
- Paratribonium
- Parazyga
- Parenteletes
- Parmephrix
- Parmorthina
- Parmorthis
- Parmula
- Paromalomena
- Paromoeopygma
- Parthirhynchia
- Parunicinella
- Parvaltissimarostrum
- Parvirhynchia
- Paryphella
- Paryphorhynchopora
- Patagorhynchia
- Paterina
- Paterorthis
- Paterula
- Patriaspirifer
- Paucicostella
- Paucicrura
- Paucispinauria
- Paucispinifera
- Paucistrophia
- Paulonia
- Paurogastroderhynchus
- Paurorhyncha
- Paurorthina
- Paurorthis
- Payuella
- Pectenoproductus
- Pectorhyncha
- Peculneithyris
- Peetzatrypa
- Pegmarhynchia
- Pegmathyris
- Pegmatreta
- **Pelagodiscus**
- Peleicostella
- Pelmanella
- Pelonomia
- Peltichia
- Pemphixina
- **Pembrostrophia** (fossil per IRMNG)
- Peniculauris
- Pennospiriferina
- Pentactinella
- Pentagonia
- Pentamerella
- Pentamerifera
- Pentameroides
- Pentamerus
- Pentithyris
- Pentlandella
- Pentlandina
- Penzhinella
- Penzhinothyris
- Perakia
- Peratos
- Perditocardinia
- Peregrinella
- Peregrinellina
- Peregrinelloidea
- Periallus
- Perichonetes
- Peridalejina
- Perigeyerella
- Perimecocoelia
- Perissothyris
- Peristerothyris
- Peritrimerella
- Peritritoechia
- Permasyrinx
- Permianella
- Permicola
- Permochonetes
- Permophricodothyris
- Permorthotestes
- Permospirifer
- Permundaria
- Perrarisinurostrum
- Perrierithyris
- Perryspirifer
- Peshiatrypa
- Pesterevatrypa
- Petalochonetes
- Petalothyris
- Petasmaia
- Petasmaria
- Petasmatherus
- Petrocrania
- Petroria
- Petshorospirifer
- Pexidella
- Phaceloorthis
- **Phaneropora**
- Phapsirhynchia
- Pharcidodiscus
- Phenacozugmayerella
- Philhedra
- Philhedrella
- Philippotia
- Phlogoiderhynchus
- Phoenicitoechia
- Pholidostrophia
- Phragmophora
- Phragmorthis
- Phragmostrophia
- Phragmothyris
- Phrenophoria
- Phricodothyris
- Phyllonia
- Phymatothyris
- Physemella
- Physetorhynchia
- Physotreta
- Piarorhynchella
- Piarorhynchia
- Picnotreta
- **Pictothyris**
- Pilkena
- Piloricilla
- Pinaxiothyris
- Pinegathyris
- Pinghuangella
- Pinguaella
- Pinguispirifer
- Pionodema
- Pionomena
- Pionopleurum
- Pionorthis
- Pionothyris
- Pirgulia
- Pirithyris
- **Pirothyris**
- Pirotella
- Pirotothyris
- Pisirhynchia
- Placothyris
- Placotriplesia
- Plaesiomys
- Plagiorhyncha
- Planalvus
- Planatrypa
- Plancella
- Planicardina
- Planihaydenella
- Planirhynchia
- Planispina
- Planodouvillina
- Planoharknessella
- Planoproductus
- Planothyris
- Planovatirostrum
- **Platidia**
- Platycancrinella
- Platyconcha
- Platyglossariorhynchus
- Platymena
- Platyorthis
- Platyrachella
- Platyselma
- Platyspirifer
- Platystrophia
- Platyterorhynchus
- Platythyris
- Platytoechia
- Plebejochonetes
- Plectambonites
- Plectatrypa
- Plectelasma
- Plectella
- Plectocamara
- Plectoconcha
- Plectodonta
- Plectodontella
- Plectoglossa
- Plectoidothyris
- Plectorhynchella
- Plectorthis
- Plectospira
- Plectosyntrophia
- Plectothyrella
- Plectothyris
- Plectotreta
- Plectotrophia
- Pleiopleurina
- Plekonella
- Plekonina
- Plesicarinatina
- Plesiothyris
- Plethorhyncha
- Pleuraloma
- Pleurelasma
- Pleurochonetes
- Pleurocornu
- Pleurodium
- Pleuropugnoides
- Pleurorthis
- Pleurothyrella
- Plicaea
- Plicanoplia
- Plicanoplites
- Plicarostrum
- Plicatifera
- Plicatiferina
- Plicatocyrtia
- Plicatoderbya
- Plicatolingula
- Plicatoria
- Plicatospiriferella
- Plicatosyrinx
- Plicidium
- Plicirhynchia
- Plicochonetes
- Plicocoelina
- Plicocyrtia
- Plicocyrtina
- Plicodevonaria
- Plicogypa
- Plicoplasia
- Plicoproductus
- Plicostricklandia
- Plicostropheodonta
- Plicotorynifer
- Plionoptycherhynchus
- Pliothyrina
- Ploughsharella
- Podolella
- Podtscheremia
- Poikilosakos
- Poloniproductus
- Polylasma
- Polymorpharia
- Polytoechia
- Pomatospirella
- Pomatotrema
- Pomeraniotreta
- Pomeromena
- Pompeckium
- Pompoecilorhynchus
- Pondospirifer
- Pontalorhynchia
- Pontielasma
- Pontisia
- Porambonites
- Porambonitoides
- Poramborthis
- Porostictia
- Portneufia
- Portranella
- Posicomta
- Postepithyris
- Pradochonetes
- Pradoia
- Praeangustothyris
- Praeargyrotheca
- Praecubanothyris
- Praecyclothyris
- Praegibbithyris
- Praegnamtenia
- Praegoniothyris
- Praehorridonia
- Praelacazella
- Praelacunosella
- Praelongithyris
- Praemonticlarella
- Praeneothyris
- Praeudesia
- Praewaagenoconcha
- Prantlina
- Prelissorhynchia
- Primipilaria
- Primorewia
- Prionorhynchia
- Prionothyris
- Proanadyrella
- Proatribonium
- Probolarina
- Probolionia
- Proboscidella
- Proboscidina
- Proboscisambon
- Procarinatina
- Procerulina
- Prochlidonophora
- Prochoristitella
- Proconchidium
- Prodavidsonia
- Productella
- Productellana
- Productellina
- Productelloides
- Productina
- Productorthis
- Productus
- Progonambonites
- Prokopia
- Prolazutkina
- Promarginifera
- Properotundirostrum
- Propriopugnus
- Propygope
- Prorensselaeria
- Proreticularia
- Prorichtofenia
- Prorugaria
- Proschizophoria
- Prosoponella
- Prospira
- Prosserella
- Prostricklandia
- Protambonites
- Protanidanthus
- Protathyris
- Protatrypa
- Proteguliferina
- Protegulorhynchia
- Proteorhynchia
- Proteorthis
- Protobolus
- Protochonetes
- Protocortezorthis
- Protocymostrophia
- Protodouvillina
- Protogamginifera
- Protogusarella
- Protohesperonomia
- Protoleptostrophia
- Protomegastrophia
- Protomendacella
- Protoniella
- Protophragmapora
- Protoreticularia
- Protorhyncha
- Protorthis
- Protoshaleria
- Protoskenidiodes
- Prototeguliferina
- Prototegulithyris
- Prototreta
- Protozeuga
- Protozyga
- Psamathopalass
- Psebajithyris
- Pseudatrypa
- Pseudoanisopleurella
- Pseudoantoquatonia
- Pseudoaulacothyris
- Pseudoavonia
- Pseudobolus
- Pseudobornhardtina
- Pseudocamaratoechia
- Pseudocamarophoria
- Pseudochonetes
- Pseudoconchidium
- Pseudocrania
- Pseudocyrtina
- Pseudoderbyia
- Pseudodicellomus
- Pseudodicoelosia
- Pseudodielasma
- Pseudodouvillina
- Pseudogibbirhynchia
- Pseudoglossirotoechia
- Pseudoglossothyris
- Pseudogruenewalldtia
- Pseudohalorella
- Pseudoharttina
- Pseudohomeospira
- Pseudokingena
- Pseudokymatothyris
- Pseudolabaia
- Pseudolaballa
- Pseudolepismatina
- Pseudoleptellina
- Pseudoleptodus
- Pseudolingula
- Pseudomarginifera
- Pseudomendacella
- Pseudomeristina
- Pseudometoptoma
- Pseudomimella
- Pseudomonticlarella
- Pseudomonticulifera
- Pseudonudirostra
- Pseudoparazyga
- Pseudopentagonia
- Pseudopholidops
- Pseudoporambonites
- Pseudoprotathyris
- Pseudopugnax
- Pseudopygoides
- Pseudorhaetina
- Pseudorostranteris
- Pseudorugitela
- Pseudosieberella
- Pseudosinotectirostrum
- Pseudospiriferina
- Pseudospondylospira
- Pseudostrophalosia
- Pseudostrophochonetes
- Pseudostrophomena
- Pseudosyringothyris
- Pseudosyrinx
- Pseudotybithyris
- Pseudouncinulus
- Pseudoundispirifer
- Pseudowattonithyris
- Pseudowellerella
- Pseudoyunnanella
- Psilocamara
- Psilocamerella
- Psiloria
- Psilothyris
- Psioidea
- Psioidiella
- Pteroplecta
- Pterospirifer
- Pterostrophia
- Ptilorhynchia
- Ptilotorhynchus
- Ptychoglyptus
- Ptychomaletoechia
- Ptychopeltis
- Ptychopleurella
- Ptyctorhynchia
- Ptyctothyris
- Ptygmactrum
- Puanatrypa
- Puanospirifer
- Pugilis
- Pugnaria
- Pugnax
- Pugnoides
- Pulchratia
- Pulsia
- Punctatrypa
- Punctocyrtella
- Punctolira
- Punctospirella
- Punctospirifer
- Punctothyris
- Punctspinatrypa
- Purdonella
- Pusillagutta
- Pustula
- Pustulatia
- Pustuloplica
- Pustulospiriferina
- Pycnobrochus
- Pycnoria
- Pygites
- Pygmaella
- Pygmochonetes
- Pygope
- Pyraeneica
- Pyramidathyris
- Pyramina

== Q ==
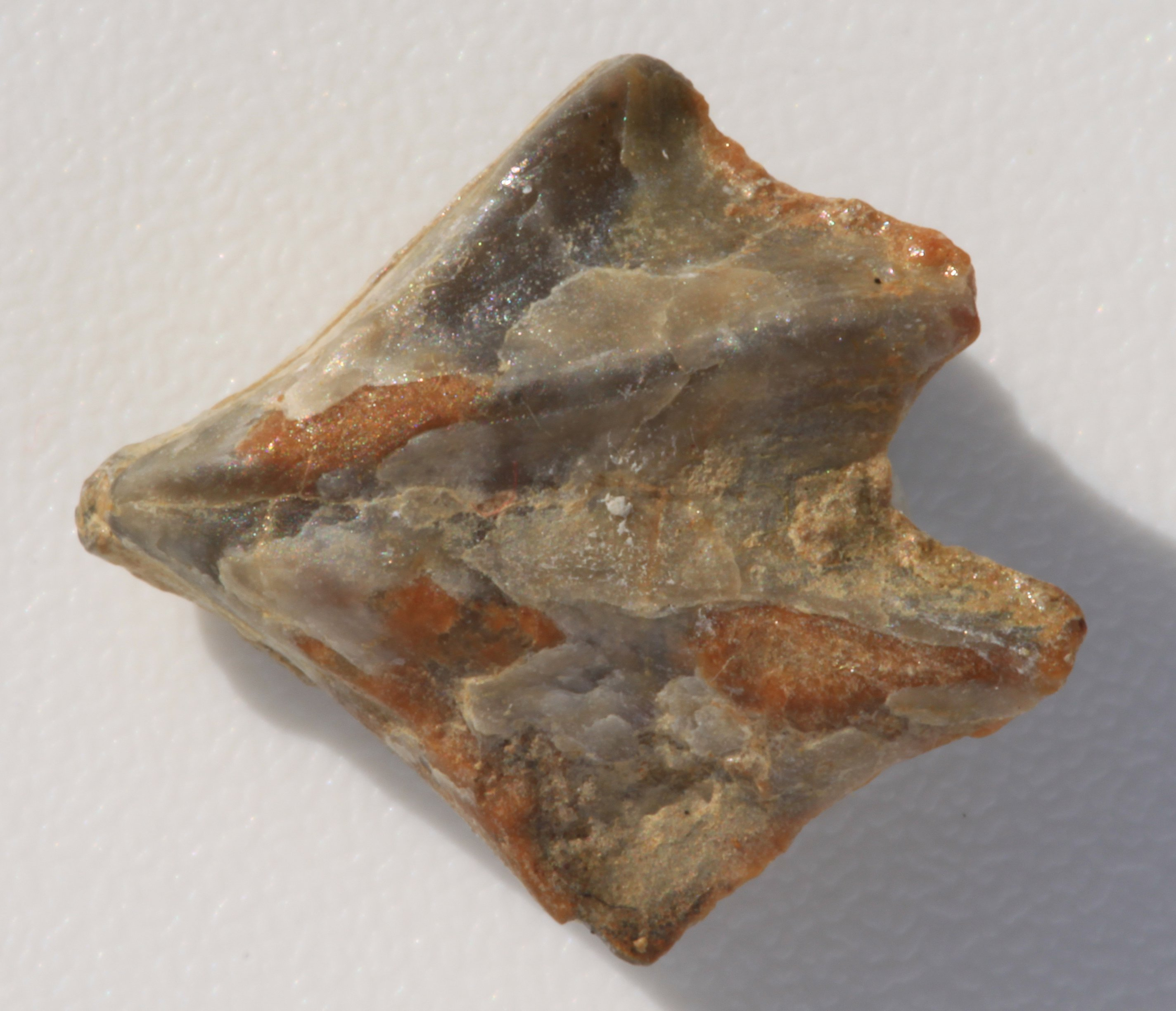
View of the pedunculate valve of Quadriloba colletti, Pragian

- Qianjiangella
- Qianomena
- Qiansispirifer
- Qilianoconcha
- Qilianotryma
- Qilianotrypa
- Qinghaispiriferina
- Qinglongia
- Qingthyris
- Qingyenia
- Qinlingia
- Qinlingotoechia
- Qispiriferina
- Quadratia
- Quadratirhynchia
- Quadrifarius
- Quadrisonia
- Quadrithyrina
- Quadrithyris
- Quadrochonetes
- Quangyuania
- Quasiavonia
- Quasidavidsonia
- Quasimartina
- Quasistrophonella
- Quasithambonia
- Quebecia
- Quinlingia
- Quinquenella
- Quiriagites
- Quizhouspirifer
- Quondogia

== R ==
- Rackirhynchia
- Radiatrypa
- Radimatrypa
- Radiomena
- Rafanoglossa
- Rafinesquina
- Rahouiarhynchia
- Railtonella
- Ralia
- Rallacosta
- Ramavectus
- Ramovsina
- Ranorthis
- Raridium
- Rariella
- Rastelligera
- Ratburia
- Raunites
- Ravozetina
- Rawdonia
- Rectambitus
- Rectigypidida
- Rectirhynchia
- Rectithyris
- Rectotrophia
- Redlichella
- Reedoconcha
- Reeftonella
- Reeftonia
- Reflexia
- Reinversella
- Remnevitoechia
- Renaudia
- Rensselaeria
- Rensselaerina
- Rensselandia
- Rensselandioidea
- Replcoskenidioides
- Resserella
- Retaria
- Retichonetes
- Reticularia
- Reticulariina
- Reticulariopsis
- Reticulatia
- Reticulatochonetes
- Reticulatrypa
- Retimarginifera
- Retroplexus
- Retrorsirostra
- Retzia
- Retziella
- Retzispirifer
- Reuschella
- Reversella
- Rhactomena
- Rhactorhynchia
- Rhactorthis
- Rhaetina
- Rhaetinopsis
- Rhamnaria
- Rhapidothyris
- Rhenorensselaria
- Rhenostrophia
- Rhenothyris
- Rhinotreta
- Rhipidium
- Rhipidomella
- Rhipidomelloides
- Rhipidomena
- Rhipidothyris
- Rhizothyris
- Rhombaria
- Rhomboidella
- Rhombothyris
- Rhondellina
- Rhynchoferella
- Rhynchonella
- Rhynchonellina
- Rhynchonelloidea
- Rhynchonelloidella
- Rhynchonellopsis
- Rhynchopora
- Rhynchorina
- Rhynchorthis
- Rhynchospirifer
- Rhynchospirina
- Rhynchotetra
- Rhynchotetraoides
- Rhynchotrema
- Rhynchotreta
- Rhynchotretina
- Rhyncora
- Rhynobolus
- Rhynoleichus
- Rhyselasma
- Rhysostrophia
- Rhysotreta
- Rhyssochonetes
- Rhytialosia
- Rhytiophora
- **Rhytirhynchia**
- Rhytisia
- Rhytisoria
- Rhytistrophia
- Richthofenia
- Rictia
- Rigauxia
- Rigbyella
- Rimirhynchia
- Rimirhynchopsis
- Riograndella
- Rionorhynchia
- Riorhynchia
- Rioultina
- Ripidiorhynchus
- Robertorthis
- Robinsonella
- Robustirhynchia
- Rochatorhynchia
- Rocheithyris
- Rochtex
- Roemerella
- Romingerina
- Rorespirifer
- Rosella
- Rosobolus
- Rossirhynchus
- Rossithyris
- Rostranteris
- Rostricellula
- Rostrirhynchia
- Rostrospirifer
- Rotaia
- Rotundostrophia
- Rouillieria
- Rowellella
- Rowleyella
- Rozmanaria
- Rudirhynchia
- Ruegenella
- Rufispirifer
- Rugaltarostrum
- Rugaria
- Rugatia
- Rugauris
- Rugia
- Rugicostella
- Rugitela
- Rugithyris
- Rugivestis
- Rugoclostus
- Rugoconcha
- Rugodavidsonia
- Rugoleptaena
- Rugolepyros
- Rugosatrypa
- Rugosochonetes
- Rugosomarginifera
- Rugosothyris
- Rugosowerbyella
- Rugostrophia
- Rurambonites
- Russiella
- Russirhynchia
- Rustella
- Ruthiphiala
- Rutorhynchia
- Rutrumella
- Ryocarhynchus
- Rzonsnickiana

== S ==
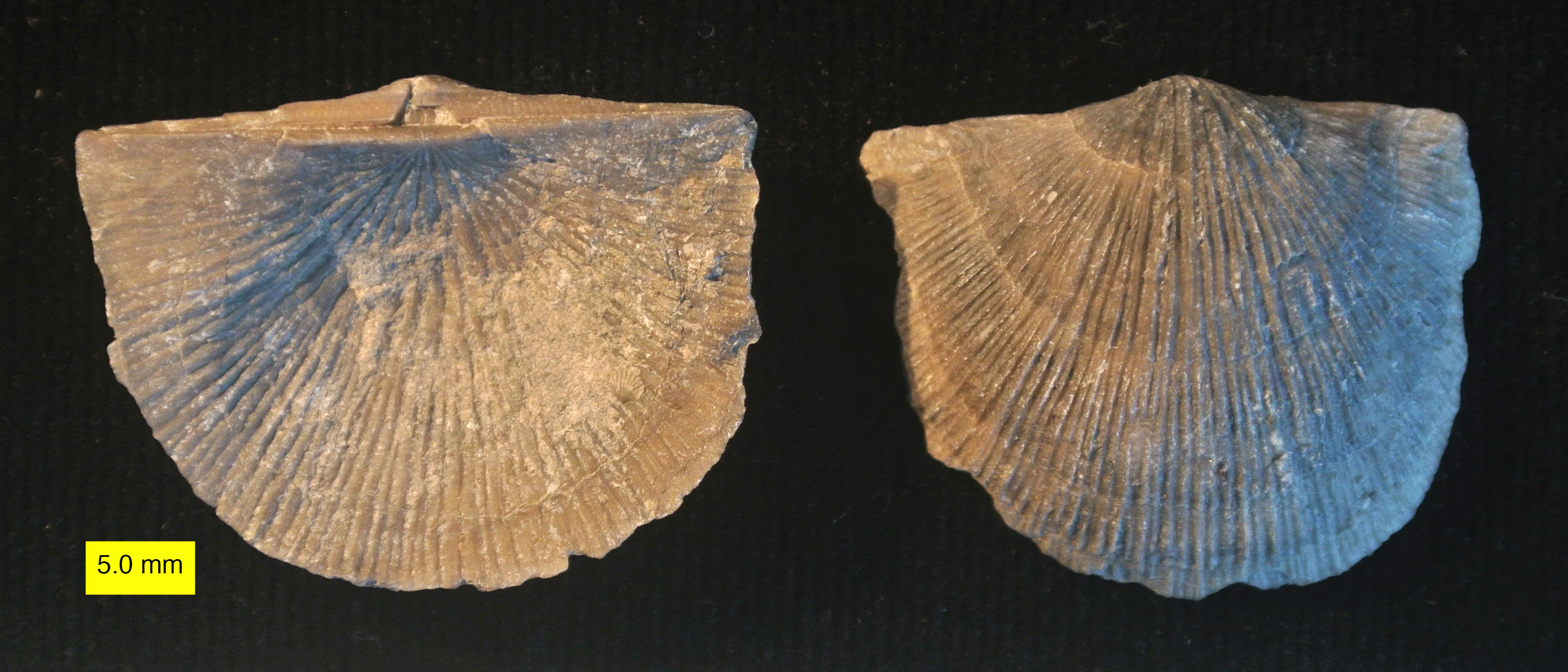
Stropheodonta demissa from the Silica Shale (Middle Devonian) of Michigan.

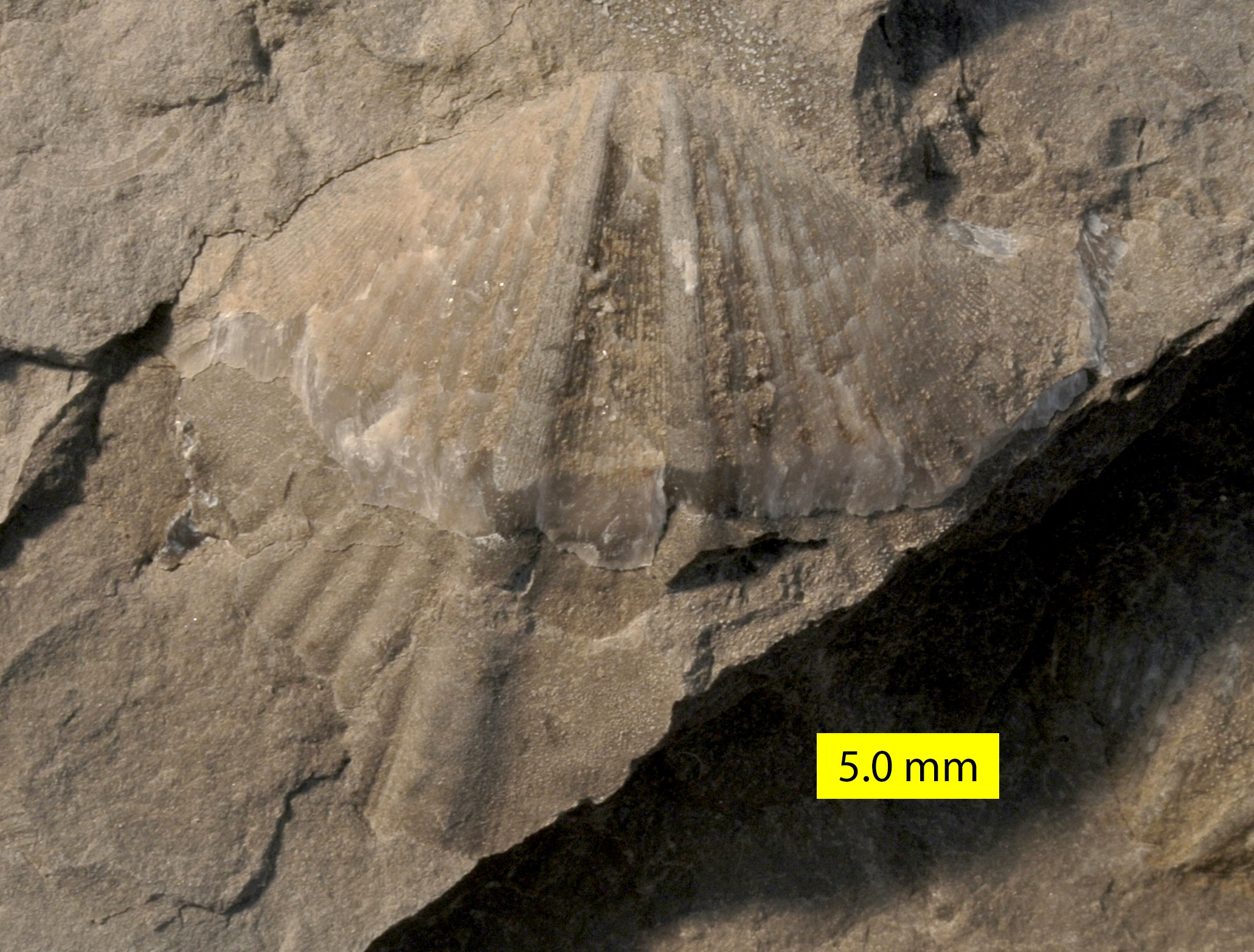
Striispirifer niagarensis (Conrad, 1843) from the Rochester Shale, Member D; Sheinwoodian (Silurian) of New York.

- Saccogonum
- Saccorhynchia
- Sacothyris
- Sacothyropsis
- Saesorthis
- Saetosina
- Sagueresia
- Saharonetes
- Sajakella
- Sakawairhynchia
- Salacorthis
- Salairella
- Salairina
- Salairotoechia
- Salanygolina
- Salgirella
- Salonia
- Salopia
- Salopina
- Salopinella
- Sampo
- Sandrella
- Sangiaothyris
- Sanjuanella
- Sanjuanetes
- Sanjuania
- Sanxiaella
- Sardope
- Sardorhynchia
- Sarganostega
- Sartenaerus = Centrorhynchus Sartenaer, 1970 (preoccupied)
- Sarytchevinella
- Satpakella
- Saucrobrochus
- Saucrorthis
- Saukrodictya
- Savageina
- Scacchinella
- Scalpellirhynchia
- Scambocris
- Scamnomena
- Scapharina
- Scaphelasma
- Scaphiocoelia
- Scaphorthis
- Sceletonia
- Scenesia
- Schachriomonia
- Schalidomorthis
- Schedophyla
- Schegultania
- Schellwienella
- Schistochonetes
- Schizambon
- Schizobolus
- Schizocrania
- Schizonema
- Schizopholis
- Schizophorella
- Schizophoria
- Schizoramma
- Schizoria
- Schizospirifer
- Schizostrophina
- Schizotreta
- Schizotretoides
- Schmidtites
- Schnurella
- Schrenkiella
- Schuchertella
- Schuchertellopsis
- Schuchertina
- Schwagerispira
- Scissicosta
- Scoloconcha
- Sculptospirifer
- Scumulus
- Scutepustula
- Securina
- Securithyris
- Sedenticellula
- Selenella
- Selennjachia
- Sellithyris
- Selloproductus
- Semenewia
- Semibrachythyrina
- Semicostella
- Semileptagonia
- Semilingula
- Seminucella
- Seminula
- Semiotoechia
- Semiplanella
- Semiplanus
- Semiproductus
- Semitreta
- Sendaithyris
- Senokosica
- Sentolunia
- Sentosia
- Sentosoioides
- Septacamera
- Septachonetes
- Septalaria
- Septalariopsis
- Septaliphoria
- Septaliphorioidea
- Septamphiclina
- Septapermella
- Septarinia
- Septasteges
- Septathyris
- Septatoechia
- Septatrypa
- Septemirostellum
- **Septicollarina**
- Septiconcha
- Septirhynchia
- Septocamarella
- Septocrurella
- Septocyclothyris
- Septoparmella
- Septorthis
- Septospirifer
- Septospirigirella
- Septosyringothyris
- Septothyris
- Septulirhynchia
- Seratrypa
- Serbarinia
- Serbiarhynchia
- Serbiothyris
- Sergospirifer
- Sergunkovia
- Sericoidea
- Serratocrista
- Serrulatrypa
- Seseloisi
- Sestropoma
- Setigerites
- Settedabania
- Severella
- Severginella
- Shagamella
- Shaleria
- Shaleriella
- Sharpirhynchia
- **Shimodaia**
- Shiquianella
- Shiragia
- Shishapangmaella
- Shlyginia
- Shordolella
- Shoshonorthis
- Shouxianella
- Shrockia
- Shumardella
- Siberiothyris
- Siberistrophia
- Sibiratrypa
- Sibiria
- Sibirispira
- Sibiritoechia
- Sicelia
- Sichuanrhynchis
- Sicorhyncha
- Sicularia
- Sieberella
- Sigmelasma
- Sigopallus
- Sikasella
- Silesiathyris
- Simplicarina
- **Simpliciforma**
- **Simplicithyris**
- Sinochonetes
- Sinoglossa
- Sinoproductella
- Sinorhynchia
- Sinorthis
- Sinoshaleria
- Sinostrophia
- Sinotectirostrum
- Sinotrimerella
- Sinuatella
- Sinucosta
- Sinucostella
- Sinuplicorhynchia
- Sinusella
- Siphonobolus
- Siphonosia
- Siphonotreta
- Sivorthis
- Skelidorygma
- Skenidioides
- Skenidium
- Slavinithyris
- Slovenirhynchia
- Smeathenella
- Smirnovaena
- Smirnovina
- Snezhnorhynchia
- Socraticum
- Sogxianthyris
- Sokolskya
- Solidipontirostrum
- Solitudinella
- Somalirhynchia
- Somalitela
- Somalithyris
- Sommeriella
- Sonculina
- Songzichonetes
- Soudleyella
- Sowerbina
- Sowerbyella
- Sowerbyites
- Spanodonta
- Spasskothyris
- Sphaerathyris
- Sphaerirhynchia
- Sphaeroidothyris
- Sphenalosia
- Sphenarina
- Sphenophragmus
- Sphenorhynchia
- Sphenorthis
- Sphenospira
- Sphenosteges
- Sphenotreta
- Sphriganaria
- Spinarella
- Spinatrypa
- Spinatrypina
- Spinauris
- Spinella
- Spinifrons
- Spinilingula
- Spinispirifer
- Spinocarinifera
- Spinochonetes
- Spinocyrtia
- Spinolepismatina
- Spinolyttonia
- Spinomarginifera
- Spinomartinia
- Spinoplasia
- Spinopunctatrypa
- Spinorthis
- Spinorugifera
- Spinospirifer
- Spinostrophia
- Spinulicosta
- Spinuliplica
- Spinulothele
- Spinulothyris
- Spirelytha
- Spirifer
- Spiriferella
- Spiriferellina
- Spiriferelloides
- Spiriferina
- Spiriferinaella
- Spiriferinoides
- Spirigerella
- Spirigerellina
- Spirigerina
- Spirinella
- Spirisosium
- Spiropunctifera
- Spitzbergenia
- Spondyglossella
- Spondylobolus
- Spondylopyxis
- Spondylospira
- Spondylostrophia
- Spondylothyris
- Spondylotreta
- Spuriosa
- Spurispirifer
- Spyridiophora
- Squamaria
- Squamathyris
- Squamatina
- Squamilingulella
- Squamiplana
- Squamirhynchia
- Squamularia
- Squamulariina
- Stainbrookia
- Stauromata
- Stegacanthia
- Stegerhynchops
- Stegerhynchus
- Stegocornu
- Stegorhynchella
- Steinhagella
- Stelckia
- Stenaulacorhynchus
- Stenocamara
- Stenoglossariorhynchus
- Stenogmus
- Stenometoporhynchus
- Stenopentamerus
- Stenorhynchia
- Stenorina
- **Stenosarina**
- Stenoscisma
- Stepanoconchus
- Stepanoviella
- Stepanoviina
- Stereochia
- Stethothyris
- Stichotrophia
- Stictozoster
- Stilpnotreta
- Stiphrothyris
- Stipulina
- Stolmorhynchia
- Stolzenburgiella
- Straelenia
- Streptaria
- Streptis
- Streptopomum
- Streptorhynchus
- **Striarina**
- Striatifera
- Striatochonetes
- Striatoproductella
- Striatopugnax
- Striatorhynchus
- Striatospica
- Stricklandia
- Stricklandiella
- Stricklandistrophia
- Strictozoster
- Strigirhynchia
- Strigospina
- Striirhynchia
- Striirichthofenia
- Striispirifer
- Striithyris
- Stringocephalus
- Stringodiscus
- Stringomimus
- Striochonetes
- Strixella
- Strongylobrochus
- Strongyloria
- Strophalosia
- Strophalosiella
- Strophalosiina
- Strophochonetes
- Strophodonta
- Strophomena
- Strophonella
- Strophonellites
- Strophonelloides
- Strophopleura
- Strophoprion
- Strophoproductus
- Strophorichthofenia
- Stroudithyris
- Struveina
- Struvethyris
- Sturtella
- Subansiria
- Subcuspidella
- Subglobosochonetes
- Subrensselandia
- Subriana
- Subsinucephalus
- Subspirifer
- Substriatifera
- Subtaeniothaerus
- Subtransmena
- Suessia
- Sufetirhyncha
- Suiaella
- Sulcataria
- Sulcathyris
- Sulcatina
- Sulcatinella
- Sulcatorthis
- Sulcatospira
- Sulcatospirifer
- Sulcatostrophia
- Sulcatothyris
- Sulcicosta
- Sulcicostula
- Sulciphoria
- Sulciplica
- Sulciplicatatrypa
- Sulcirhynchia
- Sulcirostra
- Sulcirugaria
- Sulcispiriferina
- Sulcorhynchia
- Sulcupentamerus
- Sulevorthis
- Supertrilobus
- Surindia
- **Surugathyris**
- Svalbardia
- Svalbardoproductus
- Svaljavithyris
- Svetlania
- Svobodaina
- Swaicoelia
- Swantonia
- Symmatrypa
- Symphythyris
- Synatrypa
- Syndielasma
- **Syntomaria**
- Syntrophia
- Syntrophina
- Syntrophinella
- Syntrophioides
- Syntrophodonta
- Syntrophopsis
- Sypharatrypa
- Syringospira
- Syringothyris
- Systenothyris

== T ==
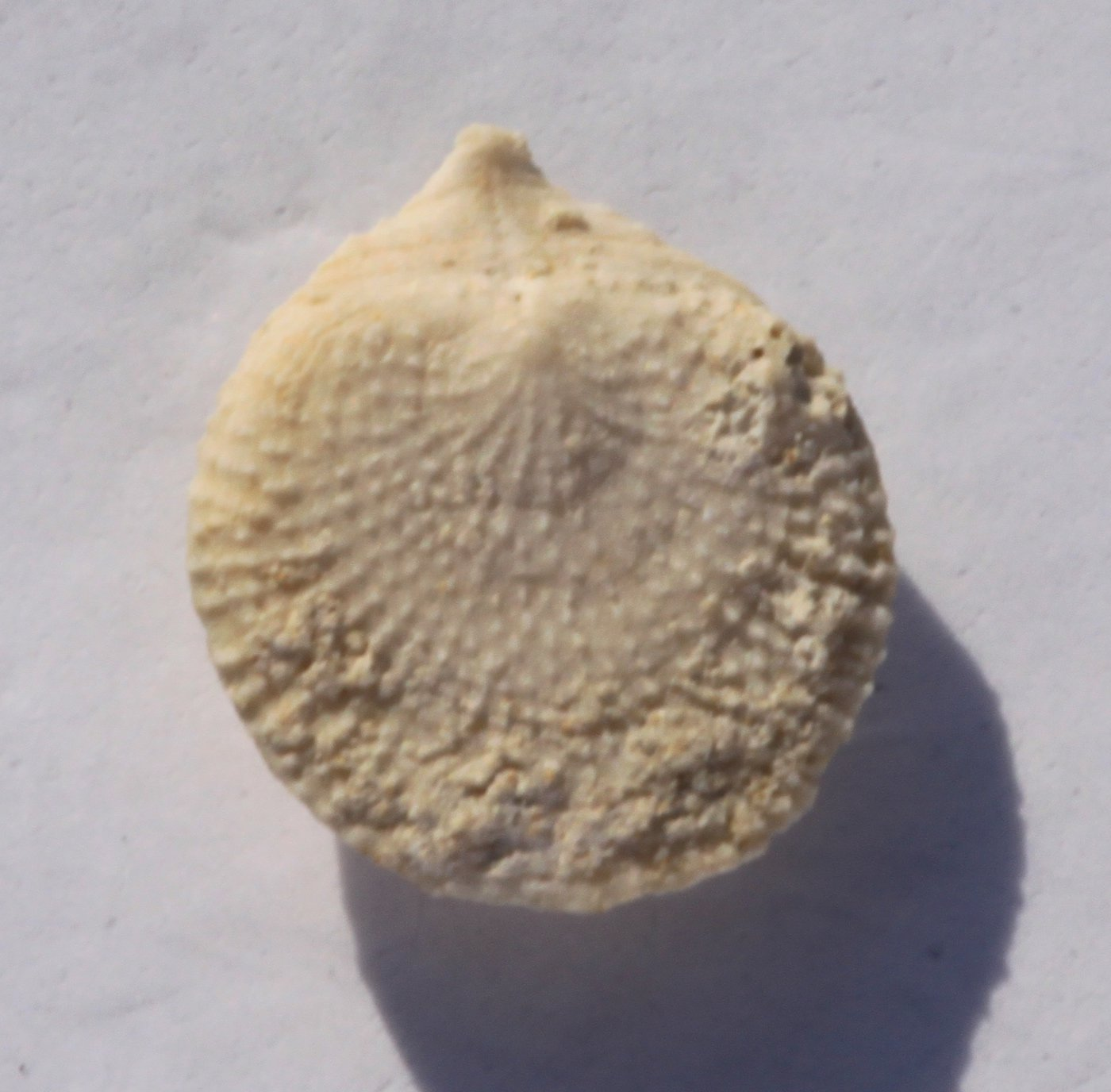
View of the brachial valve of Thecidea papillata (Upper Cretaceous)

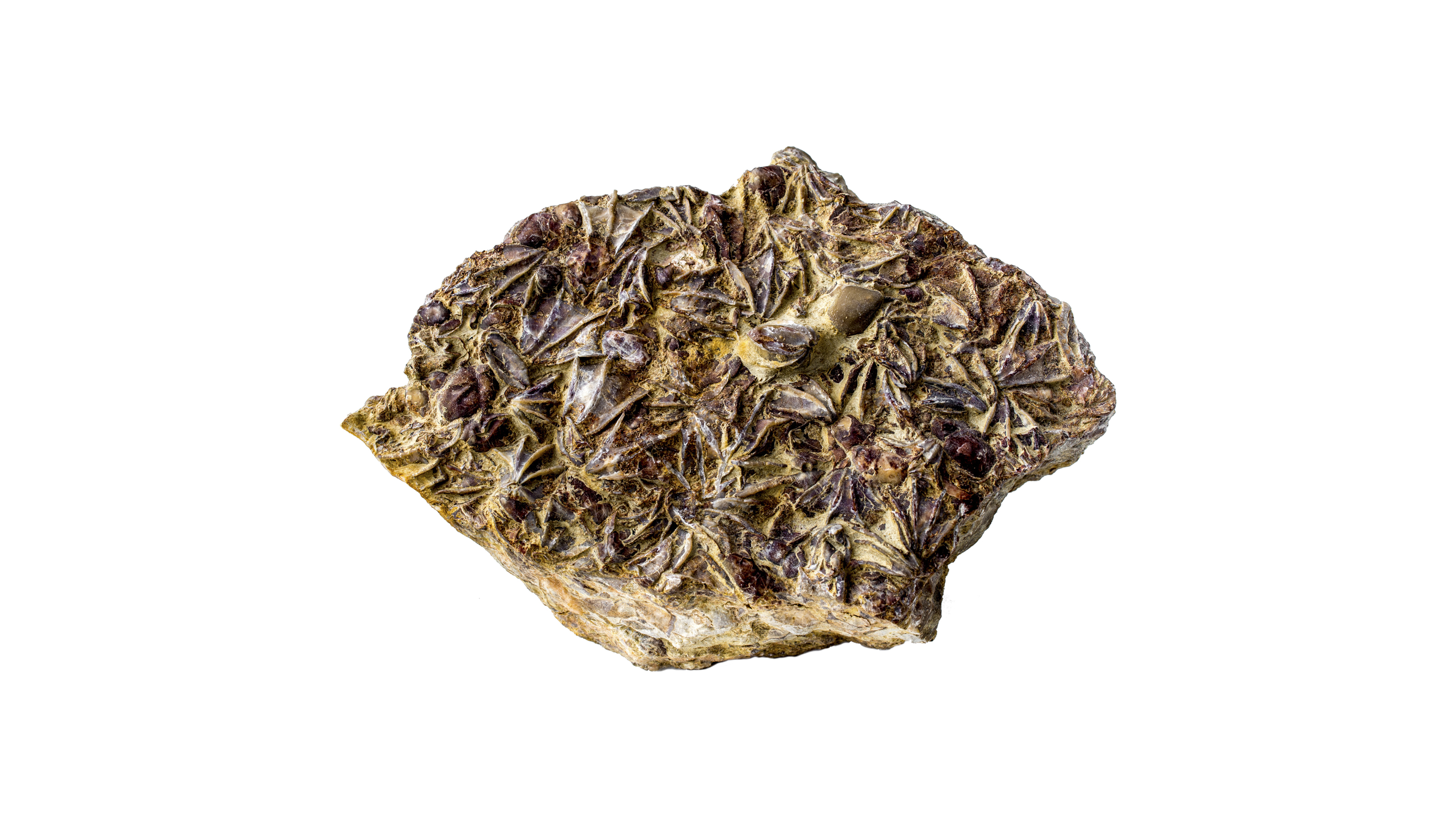
Tetractinella trigonella at MUSE - Science Museum in Trento

- Tabarhynchus
- Tabellina
- Tacinia
- Tadschikia
- Taemostrophia
- Taeniothaerus
- Taffia
- Tafilaltia
- Taimyrella
- Taimyropsis
- Taimyrothyris
- Taimyrrhynx
- Tainotoechia
- Tainuirhynchia
- Talasoproductus
- Talentella
- Taleoleptaena
- Talovkorhynchia
- Tamarella
- Tanakura
- Tanerhynchia
- Tanggularella
- Tangshanella
- Tangxiangia
- Tannuspirifer
- Tanyoscapha
- Tanyothyris
- Taoqupospira
- Tapajotia
- Taphrodonta
- Taphrorthis
- Taphrosestria
- Tarandrospirifer
- Tarfaya
- Tarutiglossa
- Tashanomena
- Tasmalella
- Tastaria
- Tatjamoa
- Tatjania
- **Thaumatosia**
- Tauromenia
- Taurothyris
- Tautosia
- Tazzarinia
- Tchadania
- Tcharella
- Tchegemithyris
- Tcherskidium
- Tecnocyrtina
- Tectarea
- Tectatrypa
- Tegulella
- Teguliferina
- Tegulithyris
- Tegulocrea
- Tegulorhynchia
- Teichertina
- Teichostrophia
- Telaeoshaleria
- Teleoproductus
- Telothyris
- Tenellodermis
- Tenisia
- Tenticospirifer
- Tenuiatrypa
- Tenuichonetes
- Tenuicostella
- Tenuisinurostrum
- Teratelasma
- Teratelasmella
- Terebratalia
- Terebrataliopsis
- **Terebratella**
- Terebratula
- **Terebratulina**
- Terebratuloidea
- Terebrirostra
- Terrakea
- Tesuquea
- **Tethyrhynchia**
- Tetjuchithyris
- Tetracamera
- Tetractinella
- Tetragonetes
- Tetraloba
- Tetralobula
- Tetraodontella
- Tetraphalerella
- Tetrarhynchia
- Tetratomia
- Texarina
- Texathyris
- Thaerodonta
- Thamnosia
- Thaumatrophia
- Thebesia
- Thecidea
- Thecidella
- **Thecidellina**
- Thecidiopsis
- Thecocyrtella
- Thecocyrtelloidea
- Thecospira
- Thecospirella
- Thecospiropsis
- Thedusia
- Theodossia
- Thiemella
- Thliborhynchia
- Thomasaria
- Thomasella
- Thuleproductus
- Thurmannella
- Thyratryaria
- Thysanobolus
- Thysanotos
- Tiaretithyris
- Tibetatrypa
- Tibetothyris
- Tichirhynchus
- **Tichosina**
- Tilasia
- Timalina
- Timaniella
- Timanospirifer
- Timorhynchia
- Timorina
- Tingella
- Tipispirifer
- Tiramnia
- Tismanorthis
- Tissintia
- Titanambonites
- Titanaria
- Titanomena
- Titanothyris
- Tityrophoria
- Tivertonia
- Tobejalotreta
- Togaella
- Togatrypa
- Tolmatchoffia
- Tomasina
- Tomestenoporhynchus
- Tomilia
- Tomiopsis
- Tomiproductus
- Tonasirhynchia
- Tongzithyris
- Tonsella
- Toquimaella
- Toquimia
- Tornquistia
- Torquirhynchia
- Torynechus
- Torynelasma
- Torynifer
- Toryniferella
- Tosuhuthyris
- Totia
- Tourmakeadia
- Toxonelasma
- Toxorthis
- Transennatia
- Transversaria
- Trasgu
- Trautscholdia
- Treioria
- Trematis
- Trematobolus
- Trematorthis
- Trematosia
- Trematospira
- Treptotreta
- Tretorhynchia
- Triadispira
- Triadithyris
- Triangope
- Triasorhynchia
- Triathyris
- Trichochonetes
- Trichorhynchia
- Trichothyris
- Tricoria
- Tridensilis
- Trifidarcula
- Trifidorostellum
- Trigonatrypa
- Trigonellina
- Trigonirhynchella
- Trigonirhynchia
- Trigonirhynchioides
- Trigonithyris
- Trigonoglossa
- Trigonosemus
- Trigonospirifer
- Trigonotreta
- Trigonotrophia
- Trigrammaria
- Trilobostrophia
- Trimerella
- Trimurellina
- Triplesia
- Triseptata
- Triseptothyris
- Tritoechia
- Trochalocyrtina
- Trochifera
- Trondorthis
- Tropeothyris
- Trophisina
- Tropidelasma
- Tropidoglossa
- Tropidoleptus
- Tropidothyris
- Trotlandella
- Trucizetina
- Truncalosia
- Truncatenia
- Tschatkalia
- Tschernyschewia
- Tscherskidium
- Tshemsarythyris
- Tubaria
- Tubegatanella
- Tuberella
- Tubersulculatella
- Tubersulculus
- Tubithyris
- Tubulostrophia
- Tudiaophomena
- Tulathyris
- Tulcumbella
- Tulipina
- Tuloja
- Tulungospirifer
- Tumarinia
- Tunethyris
- Tungussotoechia
- Tunisiglossa
- Tuotalania
- Turarella
- Turganiella
- Turgenostrophia
- Turkmenithyris
- Turriculum
- Tuvaechonetes
- Tuvaella
- Tuvaerhynchus
- Tuvaestrophia
- Tuvinia
- Twenhofelia
- Tyersella
- Tylambonites
- Tyloplecta
- Tylospiriferina
- Tylothyris
- Tyrganiella
- Tyronella
- Tyryrhynchus

== U ==
- Uchtella
- Uchtospirifer
- Uexothyris
- Ufonicoelia
- Ujandinella
- Ujukites
- Ukoa
- Ulbospirifer
- Uldziathyris
- Umboanctus
- Uncinella
- Uncinulus
- Uncinunellina
- Uncisteges
- Uncites
- Uncitispira
- Undaria
- Undatrypa
- Undelella
- Undellaria
- Undiferina
- Undispirifer
- Undispiriferoides
- Undithyrella
- Undulella
- Undulorhyncha
- Uniplicatorhynchia
- Unispirifer
- Uralella
- Uraloconchus
- Uraloproductus
- Uralorhynchia
- Uralospira
- Uralospirifer
- Uralotoechia
- Urbanirhynchia
- Urella
- Urushtenia
- Urushtenoidea
- Ushkolia
- Ussunia
- Ussuricamara
- Ussurichonetes
- Ussurirhynchia

== V ==
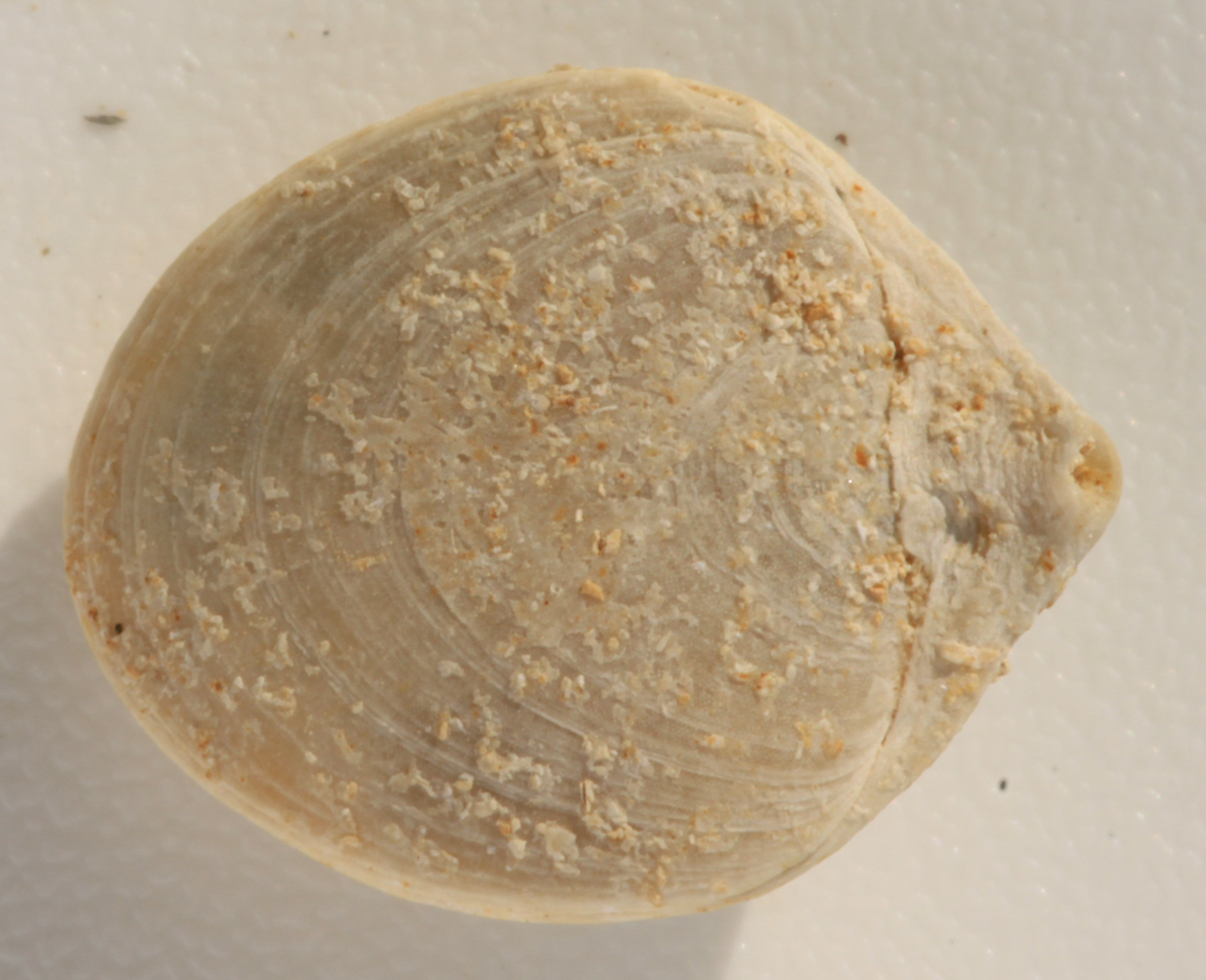
View of the brachial valve of Victorithyris peterboroughensis, Miocene

- Vaculina
- Vadimia
- Vadum
- Vaga Sapel'nikov & Rukavishnikova, 1973 jr. homonym of Vaga Zimmerman, 1958, a butterfly.
- Vagranella
- Vagrania
- Valcourea
- Valdaria
- **Valdiviathyris**
- Vallomyonia
- Vandalotreta
- Vandercammenina
- Vandobiella
- Vaniella
- Variatrypa
- Vectella
- Vediproductus
- Veerersalosia
- Veghirhynchia
- Veliseptum
- Vellamo
- Velostrophia
- Venezuelia
- Verchojania
- Verkhotomia
- Vermiculothecidea
- Verneuilia
- Vex
- Viallithyris
- Viarhynchia
- Victorithyris
- Viligella
- Viligothyris
- Villicundella
- Vincentirhynchia
- Viodostrophia
- Virbium
- Virgiana
- Virgianella
- Virginiata
- Virgoria
- Visbyella
- Vitiliproductus
- Vitimetula
- Vladimirella
- Vladimirirhynchus
- Voiseyella
- Volborthia
- Volgathyris
- Volirhynchia
- Voskopitoechia
- Vosmiverstum

== W ==
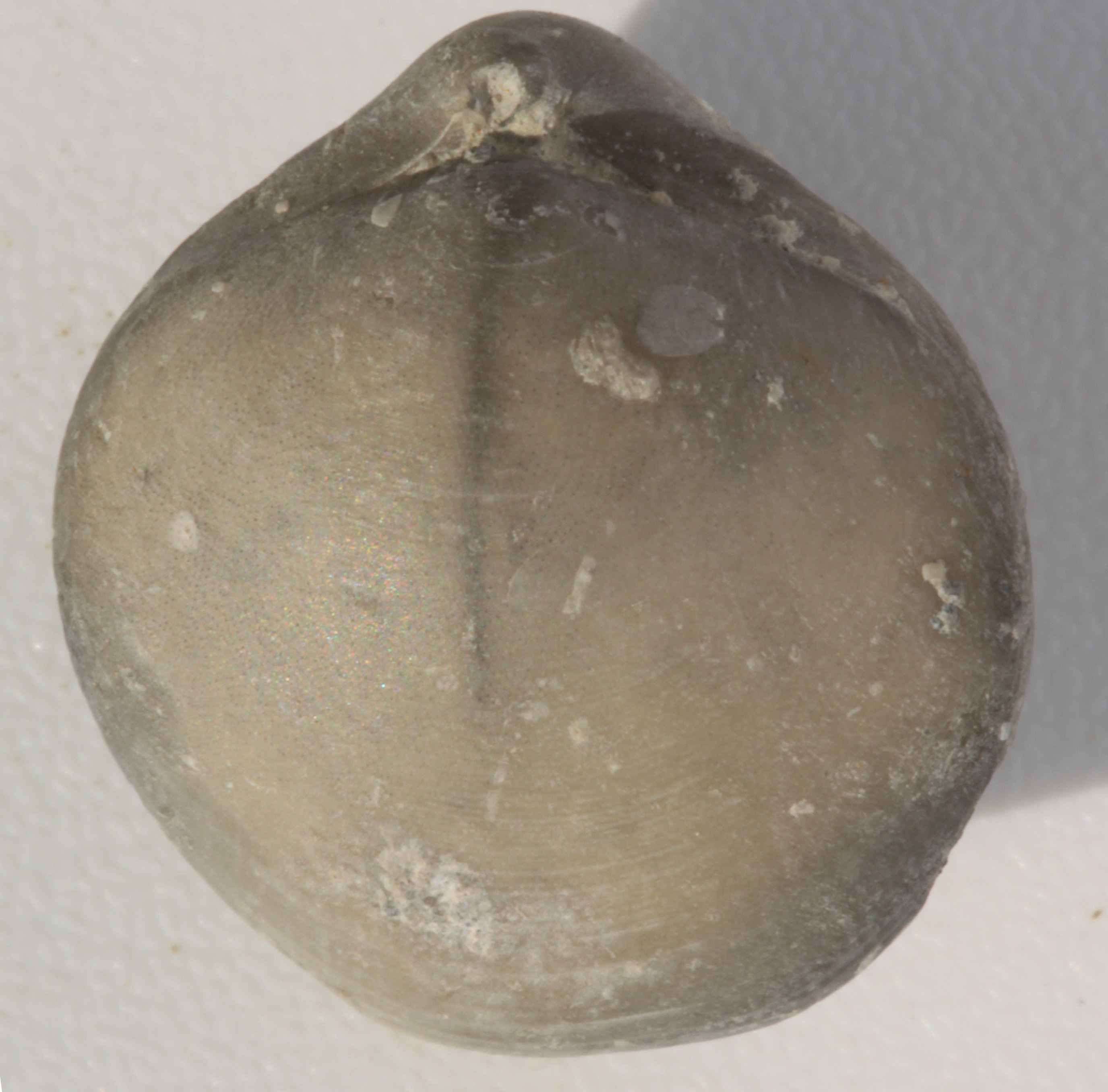
A Waconella wacoensis lampshell, view of the brachial valve, 16mm along the axis, collected from the Main Street Formation, Denton County, Texas, USA, from the final stage of the Lower Cretaceous (Albian)

- Waagenites
- Waagenoconcha
- Waconella
- Wadiglossa
- Waikatorhynchia
- Waiparia
- Wairakiella
- Wairakirhynchia
- Waisiuthyrina
- Walcottina
- Walkerithyris
- Waltonia
- Wangyuia
- Wardakia
- Warrenella
- Warrenellina
- Warsawia
- Waterhouseiella
- Wattonithyris
- Webbyspira
- Weberithyris
- Weibeia
- Weiningia
- Weizhouella
- Weldonithyris
- Wellerella
- Wenxianirhynchus
- Werneckeella
- Werriea
- Westbroekina
- Westonia
- Westonisca
- Westralicrania
- Whidbornella
- Whitfieldella
- Whitspakia
- Whittardia
- Wilberrya
- Wilsoniella
- Wimanella
- Wimanoconcha
- Wiradjuriella
- Wittenburgella
- Worobievella
- Wulongella
- Wulungguia
- Wutubulakia
- Wyatkina
- Wyella
- Wyndhamia
- Wynnia
- Wysogorskiella

== X ==
- Xanastur
- Xanthea
- Xenambonites
- Xenelasma
- Xenelasmella
- Xenelasmopsis
- Xeniopugnax
- Xenizostrophia
- **Xenobrochus**
- Xenocryptonella
- Xenomartinia
- Xenorina
- Xenorthis
- Xenosaria
- Xenosteges
- Xenostina
- Xenostrophia
- Xenothyris
- Xerospirifer
- Xerxespirifer
- Xestosia
- Xestosina
- Xestotrema
- Xiangzhounia
- Xiaobangdaia
- Xinanorthis
- Xinanospirifer
- Xinjiangiproductus
- Xinjiangospirifer
- Xinjiangthyris
- Xinshaoella
- Xinshaoproductus
- Xizangostrophia
- Xysila
- Xystostrophia

== Y ==
- Yabeithyris
- Yagonia
- Yakovlevia
- Yakutijaella
- Yalongia
- Yanbianella
- Yanetechia
- Yangkongia
- Yangtzeella
- Yanguania
- Yanishewskiella
- Yanospira
- Yaonoiella
- Yarirhynchia
- Yekerpene
- Yeosinella
- Yeothyris
- Ygerodiscus
- Yichangorthis
- Yidunella
- Yidurella
- Yingwuspirifer
- Yochelsonia
- Yongjia
- Yorkia
- Ypsilorhynchus
- Yuanbaella
- Yuezhuella
- Yukiangites
- Yulongella
- Yunnanella
- Yunnanoleptaena
- Yunshanella

== Z ==
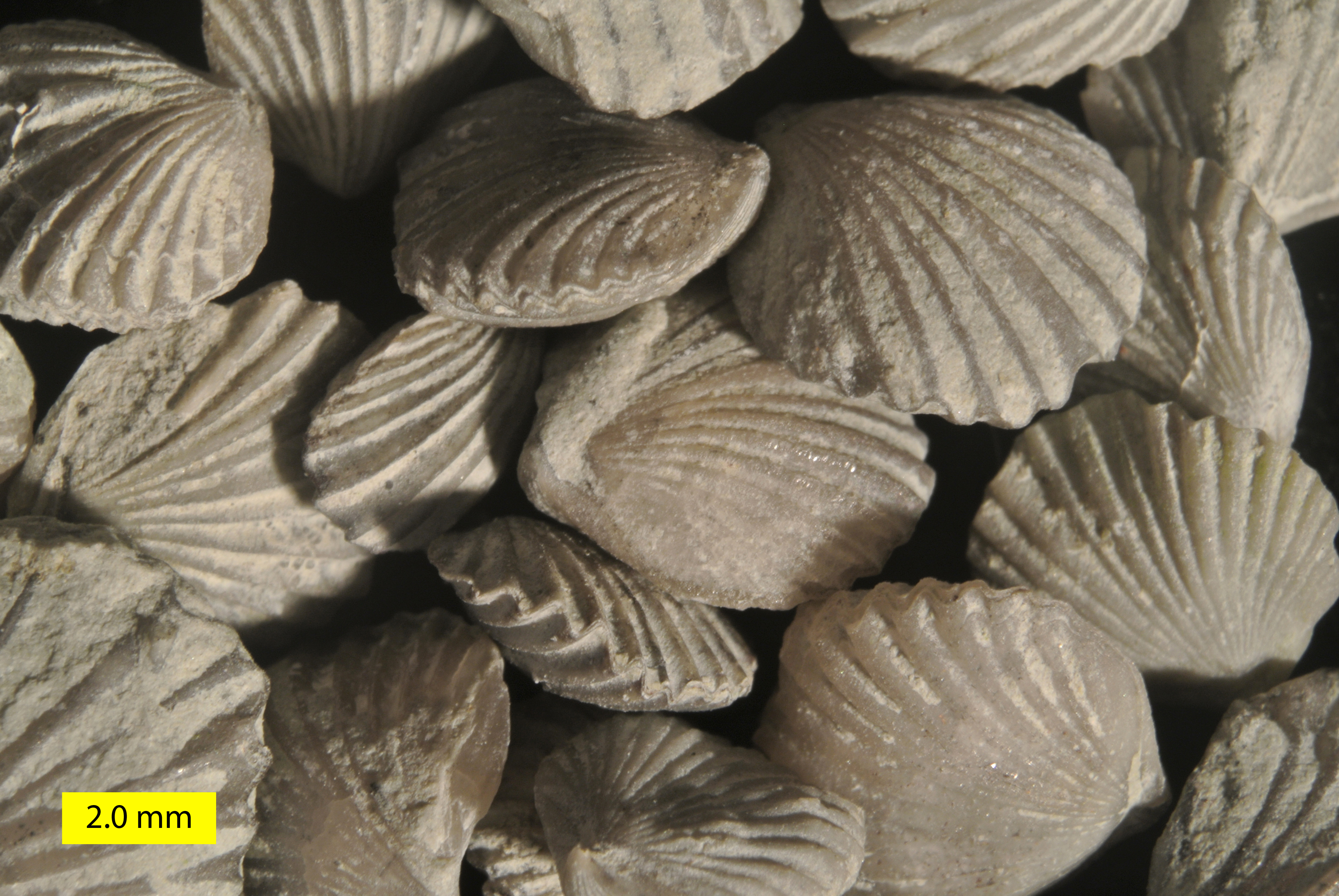
Zygospira modesta, an atrypid brachiopod from the Waynesville Formation, Upper Ordovician, southern Ohio.

- Zaissania
- Zanclorhyncha
- Zdimir
- Zdimirella
- Zeilleria
- Zeillerina
- Zellania
- Zeravshania
- Zeravshanotoechia
- Zeugopleura
- Zeuschneria
- Zhantella
- Zhejiangella
- Zhejiangorthis
- Zhejiangospirifer
- Zhenania
- Zhexichonetes
- Zhidothyris
- Zhonghuacoelia
- Zhongpingia
- Zia
- Ziganella
- Zilimia
- Zittelina
- Zlichopyramis
- Zlichorhynchus
- Zonathyris
- Zophostrophia
- Zugmayerella
- Zugmayeria
- **Zygonaria**
- Zygatrypa
- Zygospira
- Zygospirella

== See also ==
- List of brachiopod species
- Taxonomy of the Brachiopoda
- Evolution of brachiopods
