= List of living brachiopod species =

The following is a taxonomy of extant (living) Brachiopoda by Emig, Bitner & Álvarez (2019). There are over 400 living species and over 120 living genera of brachiopods classified within 3 classes and 5 orders, listed below. Extinct groups are not listed.

== Major groups ==
Phylum Brachiopoda Duméril, 1806

- Subphylum Linguliformea Williams, Carlson, Brunton, Holmer et Popov, 1996
  - Class Lingulata Gorjansky et Popov, 1985
    - Order Lingulida Waagen, 1885
- Subphylum Craniiformea Popov, Basset, Holmer et Laurie, 1993
  - Class Craniata Williams, Carlson, Brunton, Holmer et Popov, 1996
    - Order Craniida Waagen, 1885
- Subphylum Rhynchonelliformea Williams, Carlson, Brunton, Holmer et Popov, 1996
  - Class Rhynchonellata Williams, Carlson, Brunton, Holmer et Popov, 1996
    - Order Rhynchonellida Kuhn, 1949
    - Order Thecideida Elliot, 1958
    - Order Terebratulida Waagen, 1883
      - Suborder Terebratulidina Waagen, 1883
      - Suborder Terebratellidina Muir-Wood, 1955

== Order Lingulida ==
Subphylum Linguliformea Williams, Carlson, Brunton, Holmer et Popov, 1996, Class Lingulata Gorjansky et Popov, 1985

Order Lingulida Waagen, 1885

- Superfamily Linguloidea Menke, 1828
  - Family Lingulidae Menke, 1828
      - Genus Lingula Bruguière, 1791
        - Lingula rostrum (Shaw, 1798)
        - Lingula anatina Lamarck, 1801
        - Lingula tumidula Reeve, 1841
        - Lingula parva Smith, 1871
        - Lingula adamsi Dall, 1873
        - Lingula reevei Davidson, 1880
        - Lingula translucida Dall, 1920
      - Genus Glottidia Dall, 1870
        - Glottidia semen (Broderip, 1833)
        - Glottidia audebarti (Broderip, 1833)
        - Glottidia albida (Hinds, 1844)
        - Glottidia pyramidata (Stimpson, 1860)
        - Glottidia palmeri Dall, 1871
- Superfamily Discinoidea Gray, 1840
  - Family Discinidae Gray, 1840
      - Genus Pelagodiscus Dall, 1908
        - Pelagodiscus atlanticus (King, 1868)
      - Genus Discina Lamarck, 1819
        - Discina striata (Schumacher, 1817)
      - Genus Discinisca Dall, 1871
        - Discinisca laevis (Sowerby, 1822)
        - Discinisca lamellosa (Broderip, 1834)
        - Discinisca tenuis (Sowerby, 1847)
        - Discinisca rikuzenensis (Hatai, 1940)
        - Discinisca lamellosa sensu d'Hondt, 1976
      - Genus Discradisca Stenzel, 1964
        - Discradisca cumingii (Broderip, 1833)
        - Discradisca strigata (Broderip, 1834)
        - Discradisca antillarum (d'Orbigny, 1846)
        - Discradisca stella (Gould, 1862)
        - Discradisca sparselineata (Dall, 1920)
        - Discradisca indica (Dall, 1920)

== Order Craniida ==
Subphylum Craniiformea Popov, Basset, Holmer et Laurie, 1993, Class Craniata Williams, Carlson, Brunton, Holmer et Popov, 1996

Order Craniida Waagen, 1885

- Superfamily Cranioidea Menke, 1828
  - Family Craniidae Menke, 1828
      - Genus Novocrania Lee et Brunton, 2001
        - Novocrania anomala (Müller, 1776)
        - Novocrania turbinata (poli, 1795)
        - Novocrania lecointei (Joubin, 1901)
        - Novocrania huttoni (Thomson, 1916)
        - Novocrania philippinensis (Dall, 1920)
        - Novocrania chathamensis? (Allan, 1940)
        - Novocrania roseoradiata (Jackson, 1952)
        - Novocrania indonesiensis (Zezina, 1981)
        - Novocrania altivertex Zezina, 1990
      - Genus Valdiviathyris Helmcke, 1940
        - Valdiviathyris quenstedti Helmcke, 1940
      - Genus Neoancistrocrania Laurin, 1992
        - Neoancistrocrania norfolki Laurin, 1992

== Order Rhynchonellida ==
Subphylum Rhynchonelliformea Williams, Carlson, Brunton, Holmer et Popov, 1996, Class Rhynchonellata Williams, Carlson, Brunton, Holmer et Popov, 1996

Order Rhynchonellida Kuhn, 1949

- Superfamily Pugnacoidea Rzhonsnitskaia, 1956
  - Family Basiliolidae Cooper, 1959
    - Subfamily Acanthobasiliolinae Zezina, 1981
      - Genus Acanthobasiliola Zezina, 1981
        - Acanthobasiliola doederleini (Davidson, 1886)
    - Subfamily Basiliolinae Cooper, 1959
      - Genus Rhytirhynchia Cooper, 1957
        - Rhytirhynchia sladeni (Dall, 1910)
      - Genus Basiliolella d'Hondt, 1987
        - Basiliolella grayi (Woodward, 1855)
        - Basiliolella colurnus (Hedley, 1905)
      - Genus Basiliola Dall, 1908
        - Basiliola beecheri (Dall, 1895)
        - Basiliola lucida (Gould, 1862)
        - Basiliola pompholyx Dall, 1920
        - Basiliola elongata Cooper, 1959
        - Basiliola arnaudi Cooper, 1981
    - Subfamily Uncertain
      - Genus Striarina Cooper 1973
        - Striarina valdiviae (Helmcke, 1940)
- Superfamily Dimerelloidea Buckman, 1912
  - Family Cryptoporidae Muir-Wood, 1955
      - Genus Cryptopora Jeffreys 1869
        - Cryptopora gnomon Jeffreys, 1869
        - Cryptopora boettgeri Helmcke, 1940
        - Cryptopora rectimarginata Cooper, 1959
        - Cryptopora maldiviensis Muir-Wood, 1959
        - Cryptopora curiosa Cooper, 1973
        - Cryptopora hesperis Cooper, 1982
        - Cryptopora norfolkensis Bitner, 2009
      - Genus Aulites Richardson 1987
        - Aulites brazieri (Crane, 1886)
        - Aulites crosnieri Bitner, 2009
- Superfamily Norelloidea Ager, 1959
  - Family Frieleiidae Cooper, 1959
    - Subfamily Freileiinae Cooper, 1959
      - Genus Grammetaria Cooper, 1959
        - Grammetaria bartschi (Dall, 1920)
        - Grammetaria africana Hiller, 1986
        - Grammetaria minuta Zezina, 1994
      - Genus Frieleia Dall 1895
        - Frieleia halli Dall, 1895
        - Frieleia pellucida (Yabe et Hatai, 1934)
      - Genus Compsothyris Jackson, 1918
        - Compsothyris racovitzae (Joubin, 1901)
        - Compsothyris ballenyi Foster, 1974
    - Subfamily Hispanirhynchiinae Cooper, 1959
      - Genus Parasphenarina Motchurova-Dekova, Saito et Endo, 2002
        - Parasphenarina cavernicola Motchuro-Dekova, Saito et Endo, 2002
        - Parasphenarina ezogremena (Zezina, 1981)
      - Genus Manithyris Foster, 1974
        - Manithyris rossi Foster, 1974
      - Genus Hispanirhynchia Thomson, 1927
        - Hispanirhynchia cornea (Fischer, 1887)
      - Genus Abyssorhynchia Zezina, 1980
        - Abyssorhynchia craneana (Dall, 1895)
    - Subfamily Neorhynchiinae Mancenido et Owen, 2002
      - Genus Neorhynchia Thomson, 1915
        - Neorhynchia strebeli (Dall, 1908)
  - Family Tethyrhynchiidae Logan 1994, in Logan & Zibrowius (1994)
      - Genus Tethyrhynchia Logan 1994, in Logan & Zibrowius (1994)
        - Tethyrhynchia mediterranea Logan 1994, in Logan & Zibrowius (1994)
- Superfamily Hemithiridoidea Rzhonsnitskaia, 1956
  - Family Hemithirididae Rzhonsnitskaia, 1956
      - Genus Pemphixina Cooper, 1981
        - Pemphixina pyxidata (Davidson, 1880)
      - Genus Hemithiris d'Orbigny, 1847
        - Hemithiris psittacea (Gmelin, 1790)
        - Hemithiris woodwardi (Adams, 1863)
  - Family Notosariidae Mancenido et Owen, 2002
      - Genus Notosaria Cooper, 1959
        - Notosaria nigricans (Sowerby, 1846)
        - Notosaria reinga Lee et Wilson, 1979

== Order Thecideida ==
Subphylum Rhynchonelliformea Williams, Carlson, Brunton, Holmer et Popov, 1996, Class Rhynchonellata Williams, Carlson, Brunton, Holmer et Popov, 1996

Order Thecideida Elliot, 1958

- Superfamily Thecideoidea Gray, 1840
  - Family Thecidellinidae Elliot, 1958
    - Subfamily Thecidellininae Elliot, 1953
      - Genus Thecidellina Thomson, 1915
        - Thecidellina barretti (Davidson, 1864)
        - Thecidellina maxilla (Hedley, 1899)
        - Thecidellina blochmanni Dall, 1920
        - Thecidellina japonica (Hayasaka, 1938)
        - Thecidellina congregata Cooper, 1954
        - Thecidellina meyeri Hoffmann et Lüter, 2008
        - Thecidellina bahamiensis Lüter, Hoffmann et Logan, 2008
        - Thecidellina williamsi Lüter, Hoffmann et Logan, 2008
        - Thecidellina insolita Hoffmann et Lüter, 2010
        - Thecidellina europa Logan, Hoffmann et Lüter, 2015
        - Thecidellina mawaliana Simon, Lüter, Logan et Mottequin, 2018
        - Thecidellina leipnitzae Simon, Hiller, Logan et Mottequin, 2019
      - Genus Kakanuiella Lee et Robinson, 2003
        - Kakanuiella chathamensis Lüter, 2005
    - Subfamily Minutellinae Logan et Baker, 2013
      - Genus Minutella Hoffmann et Lüter, 2010
        - Minutella minuta (Cooper, 1981)
        - Minutella tristani Hoffmann et Lüter, 2010
        - Minutella bruntoni Hoffmann et Lüter, 2010
  - Family Thecideidae Gray, 1840
    - Subfamily Lacazellinae Backhaus, 1959
      - Genus Lacazella Munier-Chalmas, 1880
        - Lacazella mediterranea (Risso, 1826)
        - Lacazella australis (Tate, 1880)
        - Lacazella mauritiana Dall, 1920
        - Lacazella caribbeanensis Cooper, 1977
      - Genus Pajaudina Logan, 1988
        - Pajaudina atlantica Logan, 1988
      - Genus Ospreyella Lüter, 2003 in Lüter, Wörheide & Reitner (2003)
        - Ospreyella depressa Lüter et Wörheide, 2003
        - Ospreyella maldiviana Logan, 2005
        - Ospreyella palauensis Logan, 2008
        - Ospreyella mutiara Simon et Hoffmann, 2013
        - Ospreyella mayottensis Simon, Hiller, Logan & Mottequin, 2019

== Order Terebratulida ==
Subphylum Rhynchonelliformea Williams, Carlson, Brunton, Holmer et Popov, 1996, Class Rhynchonellata Williams, Carlson, Brunton, Holmer et Popov, 1996

Order Terebratulida Waagen, 1883

=== Suborder Terebratulidina ===
Suborder Terebratulidina Waagen, 1883

- Superfamily Terebratuloidea Gray, 1840
  - Family Terebratulidae Gray, 1840
      - Genus Ebiscothyris Bitner et Cohen, 2015
        - Ebiscothyris bellonensis Bitner et Cohen, 2015
    - Subfamily Terebratulinae Gray, 1840
      - Genus Acrobrochus Cooper 1983
        - Acrobrochus vema (Cooper, 1973)
        - Acrobrochus blochmanni (Jackson, 1912)
        - Acrobrochus marotiriensis Bitner, 2007
      - Genus Liothyrella Thomson 1916
        - Liothyrella uva (Broderip, 1883)
        - Liothyrella moseleyi (Davidson, 1878)
        - Liothyrella winteri (Blochmann, 1906)
        - Liothyrella neozelanica Thomson, 1918
        - Liothyrella delsolari Cooper, 1982
    - Subfamily Gryphinae Sahni, 1929
      - Genus Gryphus Megerle von Mühlfeld, 1811
        - Gryphus vitreus (Born, 1778)
        - Gryphus clarkeana Dall, 1895
        - Gryphus tokionis Dall, 1920
        - Gryphus capensis Jackson, 1952
    - Subfamily Tichosininae Cooper, 1983
      - Genus Tichosina Cooper, 1977
        - Tichosina floridensis Cooper, 1977
        - Tichosina bartletti (Dall, 1882)
        - Tichosina bartschi (Cooper, 1934)
        - Tichosina abrupta Cooper, 1977
        - Tichosina bahamiensis Cooper, 1977
        - Tichosina bullisi Cooper, 1977
        - Tichosina dubia Cooper, 1977
        - Tichosina elongata Cooper, 1977
        - Tichosina erecta Cooper, 1977
        - Tichosina expansa Cooper, 1977
        - Tichosina labiata Cooper, 1977
        - Tichosina martinicensis Cooper, 1977
        - Tichosina obesa Cooper, 1977
        - Tichosina pillsburyae Cooper, 1977
        - Tichosina plicata Cooper, 1977
        - Tichosina rotundovata Cooper, 1977
        - Tichosina solida Cooper, 1977
        - Tichosina subtriangulata Cooper, 1977
        - Tichosina truncata Cooper, 1977
      - Genus Arctosia Cooper, 1983
        - Arctosia arctica (Friele, 1877)
      - Genus Dolichozygus Cooper, 1983
        - Dolichozygus stearnsii (Dall et Pilsbry, 1891)
      - Genus Dysedrosia Cooper, 1983
        - Dysedrosia borneoensis (Dall, 1920)
      - Genus Erymnia Cooper, 1977
        - Erymnia muralifera Cooper, 1977
        - Erymnia angustata Cooper, 1977
      - Genus Zygonaria Cooper, 1983
        - Zygonaria joloensis (Dall, 1920)
        - Zygonaria davidsoni (Adams, 1867)
    - Subfamily Dallithyridinae Katz et Popov, 1974
      - Genus Dallithyris Muir-Wood, 1959
        - Dallithyris fulva (Blochmann, 1906)
        - Dallithyris murrayi Muir-Wood, 1959
        - Dallithyris dubia? Cooper, 1981
        - Dallithyris pacifica Bitner, 2006
        - Dallithyris tahitiensis Bitner, 2014
      - Genus Kanakythyris Laurin, 1997
        - Kanakythyris pachyrhynchos Laurin, 1997
      - Genus Stenosarina Cooper 1977
        - Stenosarina angustata Cooper, 1977
        - Stenosarina nitens Cooper, 1977
        - Stenosarina oregonae Cooper, 1977
        - Stenosarina parva Cooper, 1977
        - Stenosarina globosa Laurin, 1997
        - Stenosarina lata Laurin, 1997
        - Stenosarina davidsoni Logan, 1998 - now Stenosarina sphenoidea (Philippi, 1844)
        - Stenosarina crosnieri (Cooper, 1983)
- Superfamily Dyscolioidea Fischer et Oelhert, 1891
  - Family Dyscoliidae Fischer et Oelhert, 1891
    - Subfamily Dyscoliinae Fischer et Oelhert, 1891
      - Genus Dyscolia Fischer et Oehlert, 1890
        - Dyscolia wyvillei (Davidson, 1878)
        - Dyscolia subquadrata (Jeffreys, 1878)
        - Dyscolia johannisdavisi (Alcock, 1894)
        - Dyscolia radiata Cooper, 1981
      - Genus Goniobrochus Cooper, 1983
        - Goniobrochus ewingi (Cooper, 1973)
    - Subfamily Aenigmathyridinae Cooper, 1983
      - Genus Abyssothyris Thomson, 1927
        - Abyssothyris wyvillei (Davidson, 1878)
      - Genus Acrobelesia Cooper, 1983
        - Acrobelesia cooperi (d'Hondt, 1976)
      - Genus Xenobrochus Cooper, 1981
        - Xenobrochus africanus (Cooper, 1973)
        - Xenobrochus translucidus (Dall, 1920)
        - Xenobrochus agulhasensis (Helmcke, 1939)
        - Xenobrochus indianensis (Cooper, 1973)
        - Xenobrochus anomalus Cooper, 1981
        - Xenobrochus australis Cooper, 1981
        - Xenobrochus naudei Hiller, 1994
        - Xenobrochus rotundus Bitner, 2008
        - Xenobrochus norfolkensis Bitner, 2011
    - Subfamily Uncertain
      - Genus Oceanithyris Bitner et Zezina, 2013 in Bitner et al. (2013)
        - Oceanithyris juveniformis Bitner et Zezina, 2013 in Bitner et al. (2013)
- Superfamily Cancellothyridoidea Thomson, 1926
  - Family Cancellothyrididae Thomson, 1926
    - Subfamily Cancellothyridinae Thomson, 1926
      - Genus Cancellothyris Thomson, 1926
        - Cancellothyris hedleyi (Finlay, 1927)
      - Genus Murravia Thomson, 1916
        - Murravia exarata (Verco, 1910) in Blochmann (1910)
      - Genus Surugathyris? Yabe et Hatai, 1934
        - Surugathyris surugaensis Yabe et Hatai, 1934
      - Genus Terebratulina d'Orbigny, 1847
        - Terebratulina retusa (Linné, 1758)
        - Terebratulina septentrionalis (Couthouy, 1838)
        - Terebratulina japonica (Sowerby, 1846)
        - Terebratulina abyssicola (Adams et Reeve, 1850)
        - Terebratulina cumingii Davidson, 1852
        - Terebratulina unguicula (Carpenter, 1864)
        - Terebratulina cailleti Crosse, 1865
        - Terebratulina crossei Davidson, 1882
        - Terebratulina kiiensis Dall et Pilsbry, 1891
        - Terebratulina radula Hedley, 1904
        - Terebratulina valdiviae Blochmann, 1908
        - Terebratulina cavata Verco, 1910
        - Terebratulina hawaiiensis Dall, 1920
        - Terebratulina callinome Dall, 1920
        - Terebratulina reevei Dall, 1920
        - Terebratulina photina Dall, 1920
        - Terebratulina pacifica Yabe et Hatai, 1934
        - Terebratulina kyusyuensis Yabe et Hatai, 1934
        - Terebratulina kitakamiensis Hayasaka, 1938
        - Terebratulina peculiaris Hatai, 1940
        - Terebratulina sirahamensis Hatai, 1940
        - Terebratulina meridionalis Jackson, 1952
        - Terebratulina hataiana Cooper, 1973
        - Terebratulina compressa Cooper, 1973
        - Terebratulina austroamericana Zezina, 1981
        - Terebratulina australis Bitner, 2006
  - Family Chlidonophoridae Muir-Wood, 1959
    - Subfamily Chlidonophorinae Muir-Wood, 1959
      - Genus Chlidonophora Dall, 1903
        - Chlidonophora incerta (Davidson, 1878)
        - Chlidonophora chuni Blochmann, 1903
    - Subfamily Eucalathinae Muir-Wood, 1965
      - Genus Eucalathis Fischer et Œhlert, 1890
        - Eucalathis murrayi (Davidson, 1878)
        - Eucalathis tuberata (Jeffreys, 1878)
        - Eucalathis trigona (Jeffreys, 1878)
        - Eucalathis ergastica Fischer et Œhlert, 1890
        - Eucalathis rugosa Cooper, 1973
        - Eucalathis fasciculata Cooper, 1973
        - Eucalathis inflata Cooper, 1973
        - Eucalathis macrorhynchus Forster, 1974
        - Eucalathis cubensis Cooper, 1977
        - Eucalathis floridensis Cooper, 1977
        - Eucalathis magna Cooper, 1981
        - Eucalathis daphneae Bitner et Logan, 2016
        - Eucalathis malgachensis Bitner et Logan, 2016
      - Genus Melvicalathis Lee, Lüter et Zezina, 2008, in Lee et al. (2008)
        - Melvicalathis macroctena (Zezina, 1981)
      - Genus Rectocalathis Seidel & Lüter, 2014
        - Rectocalathis schemmgregoryi Seidel & Lüter, 2014)
      - Genus Bathynanus Foster, 1974
        - Bathynanus tenuicostatus Foster, 1974
        - Bathynanus inversus Zezina, 1981
        - Bathynanus rhizopodus Zezina, 1981
        - Bathynanus dalli (Davidson, 1878)
      - Genus Nanacalathis Zezina, 1981
        - Nanacalathis minuta Zezina, 1981
        - Nanacalathis atlantica Zezina 1991
      - Genus Notozyga Cooper, 1977
        - Notozyga lowenstami Cooper, 1977
        - Notozyga gracilis Hiller, 1986
    - Subfamily Agulhasiinae Muir-Wood, 1965
      - Genus Agulhasia King 1871
        - Agulhasia davidsoni King, 1871
        - Agulhasia densicostata Cooper, 1988
  - Family Cnismatocentridae Cooper, 1973
    - Subfamily Cnismatocentrinae Cooper, 1973
      - Genus Cnismatocentrum Dall, 1920
        - Cnismatocentrum sakhalinensis (Dall, 1908)
        - Cnismatocentrum parvum Zezina, 1970

=== Suborder Terebratellidina ===
Suborder Terebratellidina Muir-Wood, 1955

- Superfamily Zeillerioidea Allan, 1940
  - Family Zeilleriidae Allan, 1940
    - Subfamily Macandreviinae Cooper, 1973
      - Genus Macandrevia King, 1859
        - Macandrevia cranium (Müller, 1776)
        - Macandrevia tenera (Jeffreys, 1876)
        - Macandrevia americana Dall, 1895
        - Macandrevia diamantina Dall, 1895
        - Macandrevia bayeri Cooper, 1975
        - Macandrevia africana Cooper, 1975
        - Macandrevia emigi Bitner et Logan, 2016
- Superfamily Kingenoidea Elliot, 1948
  - Family Kingenidae Elliot, 1948
    - Subfamily Ecnomiosinae Cooper, 1977
      - Genus Ecnomiosa Cooper, 1977
        - Ecnomiosa gerda Cooper, 1977
        - Ecnomiosa inexpectata Cooper, 1981
  - Family Aulacothyropsidae Dagys, 1972
    - Subfamily Babukellinae MacKinnon, Smirnova et Lee, 2002
      - Genus Fallax Atkins, 1960
        - Fallax dalliniformis Atkins, 1960
        - Fallax antarcticus Foster, 1974
        - Fallax neocaledonensis (Laurin, 1997)
      - Genus Septicollarina Zezina, 1981
        - Septicollarina hemiechinata Zezina, 1981
        - Septicollarina oceanica Zezina, 1990
        - Septicollarina zezinae Bitner, 2009
- Superfamily Laqueoidea Thomson, 1927
  - Family Laqueidae Thomson, 1927
    - Subfamily Laqueinae Thomson, 1927
      - Genus Laqueus Dall, 1870
        - Laqueus erythraeus Dall, 1920
        - Laqueus rubellus (Sowerby, 1846)
        - Laqueus suffusus (Dall, 1870)
        - Laqueus jeffreysi Dall, 1877
        - Laqueus blanfordi (Dunker, 1882)
        - Laqueus vancouveriensis Davidson, 1887
        - Laqueus morsei Dall, 1908
        - Laqueus quadratus Yabe et Hatai, 1934
        - Laqueus proprius Yabe et Hatai, 1934
        - Laqueus orbicularis Yabe et Hatai, 1934
        - Laqueus concentricus Yabe et Hatai, 1936
        - Laqueus pacifica Hatai, 1936
        - Laqueus pallidus Hatai, 1939
    - Subfamily Glaciarculinae MacKinnon et Lee, 2002
      - Genus Glaciarcula Elliott, 1956
        - Glaciarcula spitzbergensis (Davidson, 1852)
        - Glaciarcula frieli (Davidson, 1878)
  - Family Frenulinidae Hatai, 1938
    - Subfamily Frenulininae Hatai, 1938
      - Genus Frenulina Dall, 1894
        - Frenulina sanguinolenta (Gmelin, 1790)
        - Frenulina mauiensis Dall, 1920
        - Frenulina cruenta Cooper, 1973
      - Genus Jolonica Dall, 1920
        - Jolonica hedleyi Dall, 1920
        - Jolonica alcocki (Joubin, 1906)
        - Jolonica nipponica Yabe et Hatai, 1934
        - Jolonica suffusa (Cooper, 1973)
    - Subfamily Pictothyridinae Yabe et Hatai, 1941
      - Genus Pictothyris Thomson, 1927
        - Pictothyris picta (Dallwyn, 1817)
        - Pictothyris elegans Yabe et Hatai, 1936
        - Pictothyris laquaeformis Yabe et Hatai, 1936
    - Subfamily Shimodaiinae MacKinnon et Lee, 2006
      - Genus Shimodaia MacKinnon, Saito et Endo, 1997
        - Shimodaia pterygiota MacKinnon, Saito et Endo, 1997
        - Shimodaia macclesfieldensis MacKinnon et Long, 2009
  - Family Terebrataliidae Richardson, 1975
    - Subfamily Terebrataliinae Richardson, 1975
      - Genus Terebratalia Beecher, 1895
        - Terebratalia transversa (Sowerby, 1846)
        - Terebratalia coreanica (Adams et Reeve, 1850)
        - Terebratalia gouldi (Dall, 1891)
        - Terebratalia xanthica (Dall, 1920)
      - Genus Coptothyris Jackson, 1918
        - Coptothyris grayii (Davidson, 1852)
      - Genus Dallinella Thomson, 1915
        - Dallinella obsoleta (Dall, 1891)
      - Genus Diestothyris Thomson, 1916
        - Diestothyris frontalis (Middendorff, 1849)
        - Diestothyris tisimania (Nomura et Hatai, 1936)
      - Genus Tythothyris Zezina, 1979
        - Tythothyris rosimarginata Zezina, 1979
- Superfamily Uncertain
  - Family Uncertain
      - Genus Simplicithyris Zezina, 1976
        - Simplicithyris kurilensis Zezina, 1976
        - Simplicithyris japonica (Dall, 1920)
      - Genus Holobrachia Zezina, 2001
        - Holobrachia vietnamica Zezina, 2001
- Superfamily Megathyridoidea Dall, 187
  - Family Megathyrididae Dall, 18700
      - Genus Megathiris d'Orbigny, 1847
        - Megathiris detruncata (Gmelin, 1791)
        - Megathiris capensis Jackson, 1952
      - Genus Argyrotheca Dall, 1900
        - Argyrotheca cuneata (Risso, 1826)
        - Argyrotheca cistellula (Wood, 1841)
        - Argyrotheca barrettiana (Davidson, 1866)
        - Argyrotheca woodwardiana (Davidson, 1866)
        - Argyrotheca schrammi (Crosse et Fischer, 1866)
        - Argyrotheca rubrotincta (Dall, 1871)
        - Argyrotheca lutea (Dall, 1871)
        - Argyrotheca australis (Blochmann, 1910)
        - Argyrotheca bermudana Dall, 1911
        - Argyrotheca johnsoni Cooper, 1934
        - Argyrotheca lowei Hertlein et Grant, 1944
        - Argyrotheca somaliensis Cooper, 1973
        - Argyrotheca jacksoni Cooper, 1973
        - Argyrotheca thurmanni Cooper, 1973
        - Argyrotheca crassa Cooper, 1977
        - Argyrotheca hewatti Cooper, 1977
        - Argyrotheca rubrocostata Cooper, 1977
        - Argyrotheca grandicostata Logan, 1983
        - Argyrotheca angulata Zezina, 1987
        - Argyrotheca neocaledonensis Bitner, 2010
        - Argyrotheca furtive Simon, 2010
        - Argyrotheca cooperi Bitner et Logan, 2013
      - Genus Joania Álvarez, Brunton et Long, 2008
        - Joania cordata (Risso, 1826)
        - Joania mayi Blochmann, 1914
        - Joania arguta Grant, 1983
  - Family Thaumatosiidae Cooper, 1973
      - Genus Thaumatosia Cooper, 1973
        - Thaumatosia anomala Cooper, 1973
- Superfamily Bouchardioidea Allan, 1940
  - Family Bouchardiidae Allan, 1940
      - Genus Bouchardia Davidson, 1850
        - Bouchardia rosea (Mawe, 1823)
- Superfamily Platidioidea Dall, 1870
  - Family Platidiidae Dall, 1870
    - Subfamily Platidiinae Dall, 1870
      - Genus Platidia Costa, 1852
        - Platidia anomioides (Scacchi et Philippi, 1844 in Philippi, 1844)
        - Platidia clepsidra Cooper, 1973
      - Genus Amphithyris Thomson, 1918
        - Amphithyris buckmani Thomson, 1918
        - Amphithyris seminula (Philippi, 1836)
        - Amphithyris hallenttensis Foster, 1974
        - Amphithyris richardsonae Campbell et Fleming, 1981
        - Amphithyris parva Mackinnon, Hiller, Long et Marshall, 2008
        - Amphithyris cavernicola Nauendorf, Wörheide & Lüter, 2014
        - Amphithyris comitodensis Nauendorf, Wörheide & Lüter, 2014
      - Genus Neoaemula Mackinnon, Hiller, Long et Marshall, 2008
        - Neoaemula vector Mackinnon, Hiller, Long et Marshall, 2008
      - Genus Annuloplatidia Zezina, 1981
        - Annuloplatidia indopacifica Zezina, 1981
        - Annuloplatidia horni (Gabb, 1861)
        - Annuloplatidia annulata (Atkins, 1959)
        - Annuloplatidia richeri Bitner, 2009
        - Annuloplatidia curiosa Bitner, 2014
    - Subfamily Phaneroporinae Zezina, 1981
      - Genus Phaneropora Zezina, 1981
        - Phaneropora galatheae Zezina, 1981
      - Genus Leptothyrella Muir-Wood, 1965
        - Leptothyrella incerta (Davidson, 1878)
        - Leptothyrella ignota (Muir-Wood, 1959)
        - Leptothyrella fijiensis Bitner, 2008
- Superfamily Terebratelloidea King, 1850
  - Family Terebratellidae King, 1850
    - Subfamily Terebratellinae King, 1850
      - Genus Terebratella d'Orbigny, 1847
        - Terebratella dorsata (Gmelin, 1790)
        - Terebratella crenulata Sowerby, 1846
        - Terebratella labradorensis Sowerby, 1846
        - Terebratella tenuis Tort, 2003
      - Genus Magasella Dall, 1840
        - Magasella sanguinea (Leach, 1814)
        - Magasella haurakiensis (Allan, 1931)
      - Genus Aerothyris Allan, 1939
        - Aerothyris macquariensis (Thomson, 1918)
        - Aerothyris kerguelensis (Davidson, 1878)
      - Genus Aneboconcha Cooper, 1973
        - Aneboconcha obscura Cooper, 1973
        - Aneboconcha smithii (Pfeffer, 1886)
        - Aneboconcha eichleri (Allan, 1939) - see also Aerothyris kerguelensis
      - Genus Calloria Cooper et Lee, 1993
        - Calloria inconspicua (Sowerby, 1846)
        - Calloria variegata Cooper et Doherty, 1993
      - Genus Dyscritosia Cooper, 1982
        - Dyscritosia secreta Cooper, 1982
      - Genus Fosteria Zezina, 1980
        - Fosteria spinosa (Foster, 1974)
      - Genus Gyrothyris Thomson, 1918
        - Gyrothyris mawsoni Thomson, 1918
        - Gyrothyris williamsi Bitner, Cohen, Long, Richer de Forges et Saito, 2008
      - Genus Neothyris Douvillé, 1879
        - Neothyris lenticularis (Deshayes, 1839)
        - Neothyris ovalis (Hutton, 1886)
        - Neothyris westpacifica Zezina, 2001
      - Genus Syntomaria Cooper, 1982
        - Syntomaria curiosa Cooper, 1982
    - Subfamily Anakineticinae Richardson, 1991
      - Genus Anakinetica Richardson, 1987
        - Anakinetica cumingii (Davidson, 1852)
      - Genus Parakinetica Richardson, 1987
        - Parakinetica stewarti Richardson, 1987
    - Subfamily Magellaniinae Beecher, 1895
      - Genus Magellania Bayle, 1880
        - Magellania flavescens (Lamarck, 1819)
        - Magellania venosa (Solander, 1786)
        - Magellania joubini Blochmann, 1906
        - Magellania fragilis Smith, 1907
    - Subfamily Uncertain
      - Genus Magadinella Thomson, 1915
        - Magadinella mineuri Richardson, 1987
      - Genus Pirothyris Thomson, 1927
        - Pirothyris vercoi (Blochmann, 1910)
  - Family Dallinidae Beecher, 1895
    - Subfamily Dallininae Beecher, 1895
      - Genus Dallina Beecher, 1895
        - Dallina septigera (Lovén, 1845)
        - Dallina raphaelis (Dall, 1870)
        - Dallina triangularis Yabe et Hatai, 1934
        - Dallina floridana (Pourtalès, 1867)
        - Dallina obessa Yabe et Hatai, 1934
        - Dallina elongata Hatai, 1940
        - Dallina profundis Konjukova, 1957
        - Dallina eltanini Foster, 1974
        - Dallina parva Cooper, 1981
    - Subfamily Nipponithyridinae Hatai, 1938
      - Genus Nipponithyris Yabe et Hatai, 1934
        - Nipponithyris nipponensis Yabe et Hatai, 1934
        - Nipponithyris afra Cooper, 1973
        - Nipponithyris lauensis Bitner, 2008
      - Genus Campages Heydley, 1905
        - Campages mariae (Adams, 1860)
        - Campages furcifera (Hedley, 1905)
        - Campages asthenia (Dall, 1920)
        - Campages nipponensis Yabe et Hatai, 1935
        - Campages dubius Hatai, 1940
        - Campages japonica (Hatai, 1940)
        - Campages pacifica (Hatai, 1940)
        - Campages ovalis Bitner, 2008
      - Genus Jaffaia Thomson, 1927
        - Jaffaia jaffaensis (Blochmann, 1910)
- Superfamily Kraussinoidea Dall, 1870
  - Family Kraussinidae Dall, 1870
    - Subfamily Kraussininae Dall, 1870.
      - Genus Kraussina Davidson, 1859
        - Kraussina rubra (Pallas, 1766)
        - Kraussina cognata (Sowerby, 1847)
        - Kraussina gardineri Dall, 1910
        - Kraussina mercatori Helmcke, 1939
        - Kraussina crassicostata Jackson, 1952
      - Genus Megerlina Deslongchamps, 1884
        - Megerlina lamarckiana (Davidson, 1852)
        - Megerlina pisum (Lamarck, 1819)
        - Megerlina natalensis (Krauss, 1843)
        - Megerlina capensis (Adams et Reeve, 1850)
        - Megerlina davidsoni (Vélain, 1877)
        - Megerlina atkinsoni (Woods, 1878)
        - Megerlina striata Jackson, 1952
      - Genus Pumilus Atkins, 1958
        - Pumilus antiquatus Atkins, 1958
      - Genus Megerella Bitner et Logan, 2016
        - Megerella hilleri Bitner et Logan, 2016
    - Subfamily Megerliinae Hiller, Mackinnon et Nielsen, 2008
      - Genus Megerlia King, 1850
        - Megerlia truncata (Linné, 1767)
        - Megerlia granosa Seguenza, 1865
        - Megerlia acrura Hiller, 1986
      - Genus Lenticellaria Simon, Logan et Mottequin, 2016
        - Lenticellaria gregoryi Simon, Logan et Mottequin, 2016
        - Lenticellaria marerubris Simon, Logan et Mottequin, 2016
      - Genus Hillerella Simon, Logan et Mottequin, 2016
        - Hillerella bisepta Simon, Logan et Mottequin, 2016

=== Suborder Uncertain ===
Suborder Uncertain

- Superfamily Gwynioidea MacKinnon, 2006
      - Genus Gwynia King, 1859
        - Gwynia capsula (Jeffreys, 1859)
        - Gwynia macrodentata Lüter, 2008
      - Genus Simpliciforma Bitner et Zezina, 2013 in Bitner et al. (2013)
        - Simpliciforma profunda Bitner et Zezina, 2013 in Bitner et al. (2013)

== See also ==
- List of brachiopod genera
- List of brachiopod species
- Evolution of brachiopods
