= List of brachiopod species =

The following is an alphabetical list of living brachiopod species and genera.

== List ==
- Abyssorhynchia (1 species)
  - Abyssorhynchia craneana
- Abyssothyris (2 species)
  - Abyssothyris briggsi
  - Abyssothyris wyvillei
- Acanthobasiliola (1 species)
  - Acanthobasiliola doederleini
- Acrobelesia (1 species)
  - Acrobelesia cooperi
- Acrobrochus (3 species)
  - Acrobrochus blochmanni
  - Acrobrochus marotiriensis
  - Acrobrochus vema
- Aerothyris (5 species)
  - Aerothyris kerguelensis
  - Aerothyris macquariensis
  - Aerothyris fragilis
  - Aerothyris kerguelenensis
  - Aerothyris maquariensis
- Agulhasia (2 species)
  - Agulhasia davidsoni
  - Agulhasia densicostata
- Amphithyris (7 species)
  - Amphithyris buckmani
  - Amphithyris cavernicola
  - Amphithyris comitodensis
  - Amphithyris hallenttensis
  - Amphithyris parva
  - Amphithyris richardsonae
  - Amphithyris seminula
- Anakinetica (1 species)
  - Anakinetica cumingii
- Aneboconcha (3 species)
  - Aneboconcha eichleri
  - Aneboconcha obscura
  - Aneboconcha smithii
- Annuloplatidia (5 species)
  - Annuloplatidia annulata
  - Annuloplatidia curiosa
  - Annuloplatidia horni
  - Annuloplatidia indopacifica
  - Annuloplatidia richeri
- Arctosia (1 species) [fossil per IRMNG]
  - Arctosia arctica
- Argyrotheca (21 species)
  - Argyrotheca angulata
  - Argyrotheca australis
  - Argyrotheca barrettiana
  - Argyrotheca bermudana
  - Argyrotheca cistellula
  - Argyrotheca crassa
  - Argyrotheca cuneata
  - Argyrotheca furtiva
  - Argyrotheca grandicostata
  - Argyrotheca hewatti
  - Argyrotheca jacksoni
  - Argyrotheca johnsoni
  - Argyrotheca lowei
  - Argyrotheca lutea
  - Argyrotheca neocaledonensis
  - Argyrotheca rubrocostata
  - Argyrotheca rubrotincta
  - Argyrotheca schrammi
  - Argyrotheca somaliensis
  - Argyrotheca thurmanni
  - Argyrotheca woodwardiana
- Aulites (2 species)
  - Aulites brazieri
  - Aulites crosnieri
- Basiliola (5 species)
  - Basiliola arnaudi
  - Basiliola beecheri
  - Basiliola elongata
  - Basiliola lucida
  - Basiliola pompholyx
- Basiliolella (2 species)
  - Basiliolella colurnus
  - Basiliolella grayi
- Bathynanus (4 species)
  - Bathynanus dalli
  - Bathynanus inversus
  - Bathynanus rhizopodus
  - Bathynanus tenuicostatus
- Bouchardia (1 species) [fossil per IRMNG]
  - Bouchardia rosea
- Calloria (2 species)
  - Calloria inconspicua
  - Calloria variegata
- Campages (8 species)
  - Campages asthenia
  - Campages dubius
  - Campages furcifera
  - Campages japonica
  - Campages mariae
  - Campages nipponensis
  - Campages ovalis
  - Campages pacifica
- Cancellothyris (1 species)
  - Cancellothyris hedleyi
- Chlidonophora (2 species)
  - Chlidonophora chuni
  - Chlidonophora incerta
- Cnismatocentrum (2 species)
  - Cnismatocentrum parvum
  - Cnismatocentrum sakhalinensis
- Compsothyris (2 species)
  - Compsothyris ballenyi
  - Compsothyris racovitzae
- Coptothyris (1 species)
  - Coptothyris grayii
- Cryptopora (7 species)
  - Cryptopora boettgeri
  - Cryptopora curiosa
  - Cryptopora gnomon
  - Cryptopora hesperis
  - Cryptopora maldiviensis
  - Cryptopora norfolkensis
  - Cryptopora rectimarginata
- Dallina (9 species)
  - Dallina elongata
  - Dallina eltanini
  - Dallina floridana
  - Dallina obessa
  - Dallina parva
  - Dallina profundis
  - Dallina raphaelis
  - Dallina septigera
  - Dallina triangularis
- Dallinella (1 species)
  - Dallinella obsoleta
- Dallithyris (5 species)
  - Dallithyris dubia
  - Dallithyris fulva
  - Dallithyris murrayi
  - Dallithyris pacifica
  - Dallithyris tahitiensis
- Diestothyris (2 species)
  - Diestothyris frontalis
  - Diestothyris tisimania
- Discina (1 species)
  - Discina striata
- Discinisca (5 species)
  - Discinisca laevis
  - Discinisca lamellosa
  - Discinisca lamellosa sensu d'Hondt, 1976
  - Discinisca rikuzenensis
  - Discinisca tenuis
- Discradisca (6 species)
  - Discradisca antillarum
  - Discradisca cumingii
  - Discradisca indica
  - Discradisca sparselineata
  - Discradisca stella
  - Discradisca strigata
- Dolichozygus (1 species)
  - Dolichozygus stearnsii
- Dyscolia (4 species)
  - Dyscolia johannisdavisi
  - Dyscolia radiata
  - Dyscolia subquadrata
  - Dyscolia wyvillei
- Dyscritosia (1 species) [fossil per IRMNG]
  - Dyscritosia secreta
- Dysedrosia (1 species) [fossil per IRMNG]
  - Dysedrosia borneoensis
- Ebiscothyris (1 species)
  - Ebiscothyris bellonensis
- Ecnomiosa (2 species)
  - Ecnomiosa gerda
  - Ecnomiosa inexpectata
- Erymnia (2 species)
  - Erymnia angustata
  - Erymnia muralifera
- Eucalathis (13 species)
  - Eucalathis cubensis
  - Eucalathis daphneae
  - Eucalathis ergastica
  - Eucalathis fasciculata
  - Eucalathis floridensis
  - Eucalathis inflata
  - Eucalathis macrorhynchus
  - Eucalathis magma
  - Eucalathis malgachensis
  - Eucalathis murrayi
  - Eucalathis rugosa
  - Eucalathis trigona
  - Eucalathis tuberata
- Fallax (3 species)
  - Fallax antarcticus
  - Fallax dalliniformis
  - Fallax neocaledonensis
- Fosteria (1 species)
  - Fosteria spinosa
- Frenulina (3 species)
  - Frenulina cruenta
  - Frenulina mauiensis
  - Frenulina sanguinolenta
- Frieleia (2 species)
  - Frieleia halli
  - Frieleia pellucida
- Glaciarcula (2 species)
  - Glaciarcula frieli
  - Glaciarcula spitzbergensis
- Glottidia (5 species)
  - Glottidia albida
  - Glottidia audebarti
  - Glottidia palmeri
  - Glottidia pyramidata
  - Glottidia semen
- Goniobrochus (1 species) [fossil per IRMNG]
  - Goniobrochus ewingi
- Grammetaria (3 species)
  - Grammetaria africana
  - Grammetaria bartschi
  - Grammetaria minuta
- Gryphus (4 species)
  - Gryphus capensis
  - Gryphus clarkeana
  - Gryphus tokionis
  - Gryphus vitreus
- Gwynia (2 species)
  - Gwynia capsula
  - Gwynia macrodentata
- Gyrothyris (2 species)
  - Gyrothyris mawsoni
  - Gyrothyris williamsi
- Hemithiris (2 species)
  - Hemithiris psittacea
  - Hemithiris woodwardi
- Hillerella (1 species)
  - Hillerella bisepta
- Hispanirhynchia (1 species)
  - Hispanirhynchia cornea
- Holobrachia (1 species)
  - Holobrachia vietnamica
- Jaffaia (1 species)
  - Jaffaia jaffaensis
- Joania (3 species)
  - Joania arguta
  - Joania cordata
  - Joania mayi
- Jolonica (4 species)
  - Jolonica alcocki
  - Jolonica hedleyi
  - Jolonica nipponica
  - Jolonica suffusa
- Kakanuiella (1 species)
  - Kakanuiella chathamensis
- Kanakythyris (1 species)
  - Kanakythyris pachyrhynchos
- Kraussina (5 species)
  - Kraussina cognata
  - Kraussina crassicostata
  - Kraussina gardineri
  - Kraussina mercatori
  - Kraussina rubra
- Lacazella (4 species)
  - Lacazella australis
  - Lacazella caribbeanensis
  - Lacazella mauritiana
  - Lacazella mediterranea
- Laqueus (13 species)
  - Laqueus blanfordi
  - Laqueus concentricus
  - Laqueus erythraeus
  - Laqueus j jeffreysi
  - Laqueus morsei
  - Laqueus orbicularis
  - Laqueus pacifica
  - Laqueus pallidus
  - Laqueus proprius
  - Laqueus quadratus
  - Laqueus rubellus
  - Laqueus suffusus
  - Laqueus vancouveriensis
- Lenticellaria (2 species)
  - Lenticellaria gregoryi
  - Lenticellaria marerubris
- Leptothyrella (3 species)
  - Leptothyrella fijiensis
  - Leptothyrella ignota
  - Leptothyrella incerta
- Lingula (7 species)
  - Lingula adamsi
  - Lingula anatina
  - Lingula parva
  - Lingula reevei
  - Lingula rostrum
  - Lingula translucida
  - Lingula tumidula
- Liothyrella (5 species)
  - Liothyrella delsolari
  - Liothyrella moseleyi
  - Liothyrella neozelanica
  - Liothyrella uva
  - Liothyrella winteri
  - Macandrevi diamantina
- Macandrevia (7 species)
  - Macandrevia africana
  - Macandrevia americana
  - Macandrevia bayeri
  - Macandrevia cranium
  - Macandrevia emigi
  - Macandrevia tenera
- Magadinella (1 species)
  - Magadinella mineuri
- Magellania (4 species)
  - Magellania flavescens
  - Magellania fragilis
  - Magellania joubini
  - Magellania venosa
- Manithyris (1 species)
  - Manithyris rossi
- Megathiris (2 species)
  - Megathiris capensis
  - Megathiris detruncata
- Megerella (1 species)
  - Megerella hilleri
- Megerlia (3 species)
  - Megerlia acrura
  - Megerlia granosa
  - Megerlia truncata
- Megerlina (7 species)
  - Megerlina atkinsoni
  - Megerlina capensis
  - Megerlina davidsoni
  - Megerlina lamarckiana
  - Megerlina natalensis
  - Megerlina pisum
  - Megerlina striata
- Melvicalathis (1 species)
  - Melvicalathis macroctena
- Minutella (3 species) [fossil per IRMNG]
  - Minutella bruntoni
  - Minutella minuta
  - Minutella tristani
- Murravia (1 species)
  - Murravia exarata
- Nanacalathis (2 species)
  - Nanacalathis atlantica
  - Nanacalathis minuta
- Neoaemula (1 species) [fossil per IRMNG]
  - Neoaemula vector
- Neoancistrocrania (1 species)
  - Neoancistrocrania norfolki
- Neorhynchia (1 species)
  - Neorhynchia strebeli
- Neothyris (3 species)
  - Neothyris lenticularis
  - Neothyris ovalis
  - Neothyris westpacifica
- Nipponithyris (3 species)
  - Nipponithyris afra
  - Nipponithyris lauensis
  - Nipponithyris nipponensis
- Notosaria (2 species)
  - Notosaria nigricans
  - Notosaria reinga
- Notozyga (2 species)
  - Notozyga gracilis
  - Notozyga lowenstami
- Novocrania (9 species)
  - Novocrania altivertex
  - Novocrania anomala
  - Novocrania chathamensis ?
  - Novocrania huttoni
  - Novocrania indonesiensis
  - Novocrania lecointei
  - Novocrania philippinensis
  - Novocrania roseoradiata
  - Novocrania turbinata
- Oceanithyris (1 species)
  - Oceanithyris juveniformis
- Ospreyella (5 species)
  - Ospreyella depressa
  - Ospreyella maldiviana
  - Ospreyella mutiara
  - Ospreyella palauensis
- Pajaudina (1 species) [fossil per IRMNG]
  - Pajaudina atlantica
- Parakinetica (1 species)
  - Parakinetica stewartii
- Parasphenarina (2 species)
  - Parasphenarina cavernicola
  - Parasphenarina ezogremena
- Pelagodiscus (1 species)
  - Pelagodiscus atlanticus
- Pemphixina (1 species)
  - Pemphixina pyxidata
- Phaneropora (1 species)
  - Phaneropora galatheae
- Pictothyris (3 species)
  - Pictothyris elegans
  - Pictothyris laquaeformis
  - Pictothyris picta
- Pirothyris (1 species)
  - Pirothyris vercoi
- Platidia (2 species)
  - Platidia anomioides
  - Platidia clepsidra
- Pumilus (1 species)
  - Pumilus antiquatus
- Rectocalathis (1 species)
  - Rectocalathis schemmgregoryi
- Rhytirhynchia (1 species)
  - Rhytirhynchia sladeni
  - Septicollarina zezinae
- Septicollarina (3 species)
  - Septicollarina hemiechinata
  - Septicollarina oceanica
- Shimodaia (2 species)
  - Shimodaia macclesfieldensis
  - Shimodaia pterygiota
- Simpliciforma (1 species)
  - Simpliciforma profunda
- Simplicithyris (2 species)
  - Simplicithyris japonica
  - Simplicithyris kurilensis
- Stenosarina (9 species)
  - Stenosarina angustata
  - Stenosarina crosnieri
  - Stenosarina davidsoni = sphenoidea
  - Stenosarina globosa
  - Stenosarina lata
  - Stenosarina nitens
  - Stenosarina oregonae
  - Stenosarina parva
  - Stenosarina sphenoidea
- Striarina (1 species)
  - Striarina valdiviae
- Surugathyris (1 species)
  - Surugathyris surugaensis
- Syntomaria (1 species)
  - Syntomaria curiosa
- Terebratalia (4 species)
  - Terebratalia coreanica
  - Terebratalia gouldi
  - Terebratalia transversa
  - Terebratalia xanthica
- Terebratella (5 species)
  - Terebratella crenulata
  - Terebratella dorsata
  - Terebratella labradorensis
  - Terebratella sanguinea
  - Terebratella tenuis
- Terebratulina (26 species)
  - Terebratulina abyssicola
  - Terebratulina australis
  - Terebratulina austroamericana
  - Terebratulina cailleti
  - Terebratulina callinome
  - Terebratulina cavata
  - Terebratulina compressa
  - Terebratulina crossei
  - Terebratulina cumingii
  - Terebratulina hataiana
  - Terebratulina hawaiiensis
  - Terebratulina japonica
  - Terebratulina kiiensis
  - Terebratulina kitakamiensis
  - Terebratulina kyusyuensis
  - Terebratulina meridionalis
  - Terebratulina pacifica
  - Terebratulina peculiaris
  - Terebratulina photina
  - Terebratulina radula
  - Terebratulina reevei
  - Terebratulina retusa
  - Terebratulina septentrionalis
  - Terebratulina sirahamensis
  - Terebratulina unguicula
  - Terebratulina valdiviae
- Tethyrhynchia (1 species)
  - Tethyrhynchia mediterranea
- Thaumatosia (1 species)
  - Thaumatosia anomala
- Thecidellina (12 species)
  - Thecidellina bahamiensis
  - Thecidellina barretti
  - Thecidellina blochmanni
  - Thecidellina congregata
  - Thecidellina europa
  - Thecidellina insolita
  - Thecidellina japonica
  - Thecidellina maxilla
  - Thecidellina meyeri
  - Thecidellina williamsi
- Tichosina (19 species)
  - Tichosina abrupta
  - Tichosina bahamiensis
  - Tichosina bartletti
  - Tichosina bartschi
  - Tichosina bullisi
  - Tichosina dubia
  - Tichosina elongata
  - Tichosina erecta
  - Tichosina expansa
  - Tichosina floridensis
  - Tichosina labiata
  - Tichosina martinicensis
  - Tichosina obesa
  - Tichosina pillsburyae
  - Tichosina plicata
  - Tichosina rotundovata
  - Tichosina solida
  - Tichosina subtriangulata
  - Tichosina truncata
- Tythothyris (1 species)
  - Tythothyris rosimarginata
- Valdiviathyris (1 species)
  - Valdiviathyris quenstedti
- Xenobrochus (9 species)
  - Xenobrochus africanus
  - Xenobrochus agulhasensis
  - Xenobrochus anomalus
  - Xenobrochus australis
  - Xenobrochus indianensis
  - Xenobrochus naudei
  - Xenobrochus norfolkensis
  - Xenobrochus rotundus
  - Xenobrochus translucidus
- Zygonaria (2 species)
  - Zygonaria davidsoni
  - Zygonaria joloensis

== See also ==
- List of brachiopod genera
- Taxonomy of the Brachiopoda
