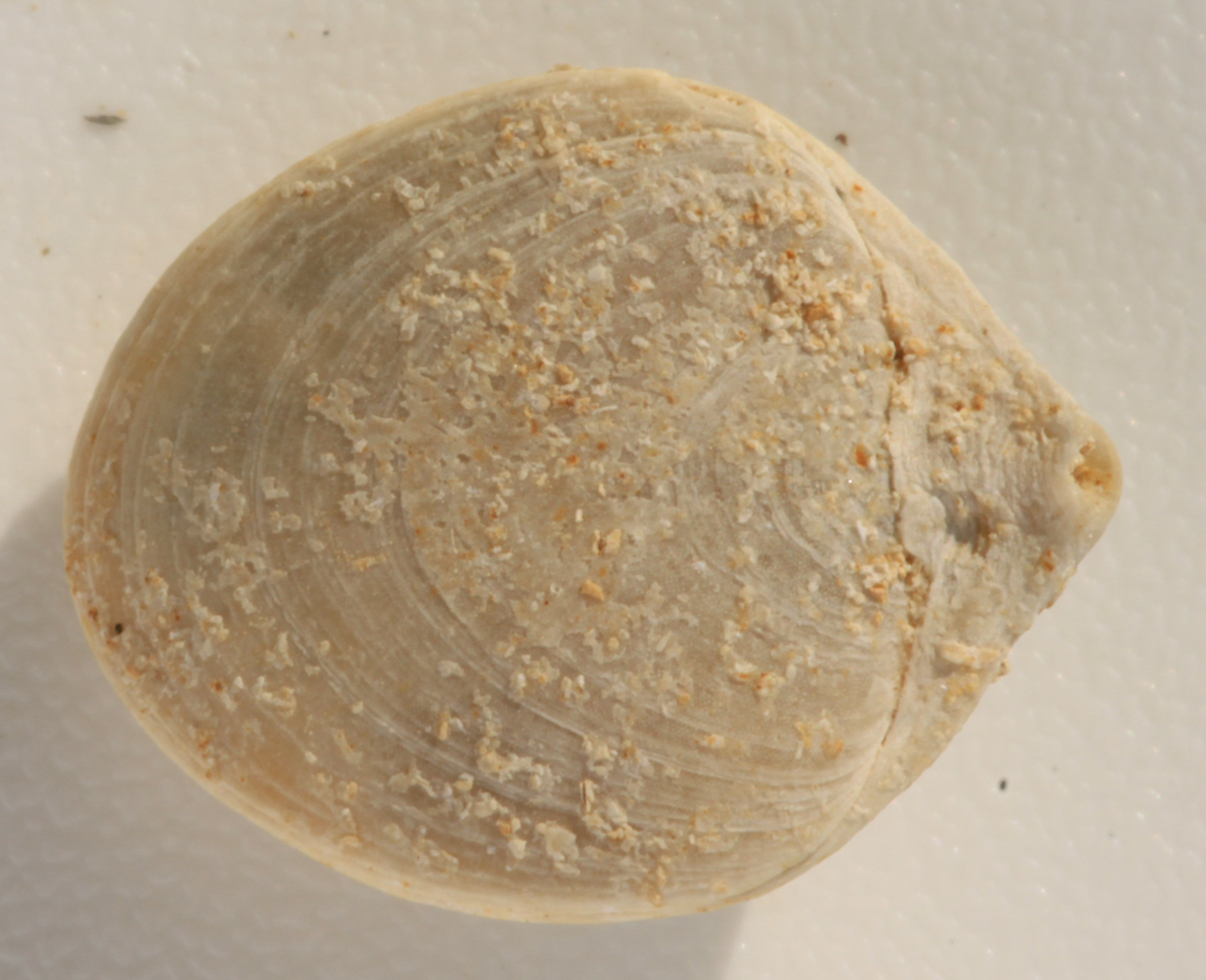
- View of the brachial valve of V. peterboroughensis

Scientific classification
- Domain: Eukaryota
- Kingdom: Animalia
- Phylum: Brachiopoda
- Class: Rhynchonellata
- Order: Terebratulida
- Family: Terebratellidae
- Genus: †Victorithyris; Allan, 1940

Species
- †Victorithyris blakeorum Craig 2000; †Victorithyris cardabiaensis Craig 2000; †Victorithyris decapello Craig 2000; †Victorithyris divaricata Tate 1880; †Victorithyris garibaldiana Davidson 1862; †Victorithyris peterboroughensis Allan 1940; †Victorithyris tateana Tate 1880

= Victorithyris =

Victorithyris Temporal range: Eocene

Extinct genus of brachiopods

Victorithyris is a fossil genus of brachiopod from southern Australia. It lived during the Eocene to Miocene period.
