= Cubanothyris =

Cubanothyris Temporal range: 221.5–215.56 Ma

Scientific classification
- Kingdom: Animalia
- Phylum: Brachiopoda
- Class: Rhynchonellata
- Order: Terebratulida
- Family: †Angustothyrididae
- Genus: †Cubanothyris; Dagys, 1959

Species
- †Cubanothyris corpulentus; †Cubanothyris elegans (type); †Cubanothyris primarius; †Cubanothyris ventricosa

Extinct genus of brachiopods

Cubanothyris is an extinct genus of prehistoric brachiopods in the extinct family Angustothyrididae. Species are from the Triassic of China, the Russian Federation and Tajikistan. The type species, C. elegans, is found only at River Kuna (Triassic of Russian Federation).

== See also ==
- List of brachiopod genera
