= Kanakythyris =

Scientific classification
- Domain: Eukaryota
- Kingdom: Animalia
- Phylum: Brachiopoda
- Class: Rhynchonellata
- Order: Terebratulida
- Family: Terebratulidae
- Genus: Kanakythyris; Laurin, 1997
- Species: K. pachyrhynchos

Binomial name
- Kanakythyris pachyrhynchos Laurin, 1997

Genus of brachiopods

Kanakythyris is a monotypic genus of brachiopods belonging to the family Terebratulidae. The only species is Kanakythyris pachyrhynchos.

The species is found in Oceania.
