= Liothyrella =

Scientific classification
- Kingdom: Animalia
- Phylum: Brachiopoda
- Class: Rhynchonellata
- Order: Terebratulida
- Family: Terebratulidae
- Genus: Liothyrella; Thomson, 1916

Genus of brachiopods

Liothyrella is a genus of brachiopods belonging to the family Terebratulidae.

The species of this genus are found in Southern Hemisphere.

== Species ==
A total of 6 extant (recent) and 17 extinct species are currently recognized in genus Liothyrella.

Living species:

- Liothyrella delsolari Cooper, 1982
- Liothyrella moseleyi (Davidson, 1878)
- Liothyrella neozelanica Thomson, 1918
- Liothyrella southernsurveyori Verhoeff, 2025
- Liothyrella uva (Broderip, 1833)
- Liothyrella winteri (Blochmann, 1906)

Extinct species:

- Liothyrella anderssoni Owen, 1980 †
- Liothyrella archboldi Craig, 1999 †
- Liothyrella brimmellae Craig, 1999 †
- Liothyrella bulbosa (Tate, 1880) †
- Liothyrella circularis Allan, 1932 †
- Liothyrella concentrica (Hutton, 1873) †
- Liothyrella elongata Allan, 1932 †
- Liothyrella gigantea Allan, 1937 †
- Liothyrella gravida (Suess, 1864) †
- Liothyrella kakanuiensis (Hutton, 1905) †
- Liothyrella labiata Craig, 2001 †
- Liothyrella longorum Craig, 2000 †
- Liothyrella neglecta (Hutton, 1905) †
- Liothyrella pittensis Allan, 1932 †
- Liothyrella subcarnea (Tate, 1880) †
- Liothyrella thomsoni Allan, 1932 †
- Liothyrella villattae Pajaud in Pajaud & Tambareau, 1970 †
