= Bouchardiidae =

Scientific classification
- Domain: Eukaryota
- Kingdom: Animalia
- Phylum: Brachiopoda
- Class: Rhynchonellata
- Order: Terebratulida
- Family: Bouchardiidae

Family of brachiopods

Bouchardiidae is a family of brachiopods belonging to the order Terebratulida.

Genera:

- †Australiarcula Elliott, 1960
- †Bouchardia Davidson, 1850
- †Bouchardiella Doello-Jurado, 1922
- †Neobouchardia Thomson, 1927
