= Gyrothyris =

Scientific classification
- Domain: Eukaryota
- Kingdom: Animalia
- Phylum: Brachiopoda
- Class: Rhynchonellata
- Order: Terebratulida
- Family: Terebratellidae
- Genus: Gyrothyris; Thomson, 1918

Genus of brachiopods

Gyrothyris is a genus of brachiopods belonging to the family Terebratellidae.

The species of this genus are found in New Zealand.

Species:

- Gyrothyris mawsoni Thomson, 1918
- Gyrothyris williamsi Bitner, Cohen, Long, Richer de Forges & Saito
