= Fosteria =

Fosteria may refer to:

- The former name of Paloma, California
- Fosteria (brachiopod), a brachiopod genus
- Fosteria (plant), a synonym for Tigridia, a plant genus in the family Iridaceae
