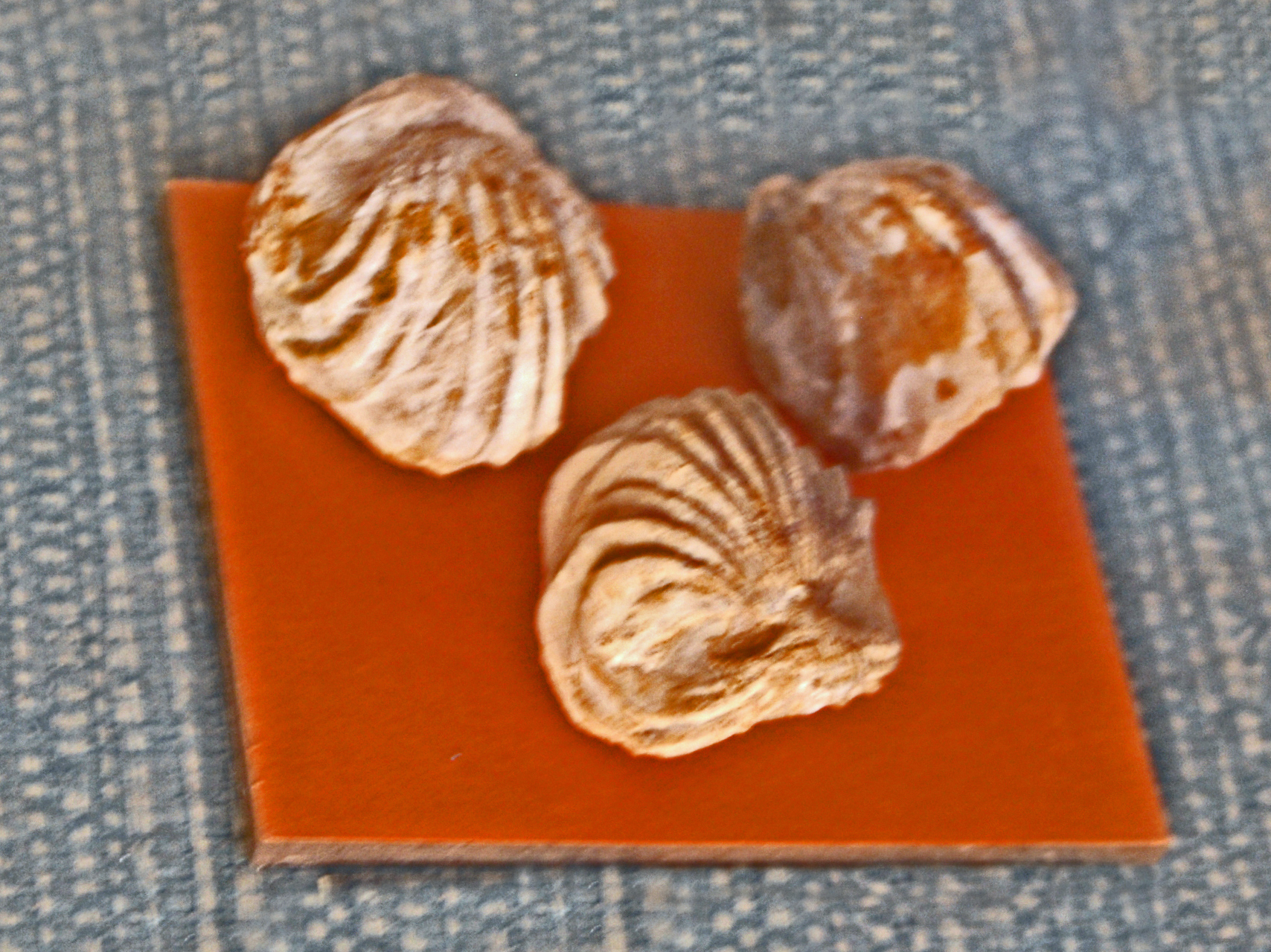
- Fossil of Isjuminella decorata from France, on display at Galerie de paléontologie et d'anatomie comparée in Paris

Scientific classification
- Kingdom: Animalia
- Phylum: Brachiopoda
- Class: Rhynchonellata
- Order: Rhynchonellida
- Family: †Tetrarhynchiidae
- Genus: †Isjuminella; Makridin, 1955

Synonyms
- Sardorhynchia

= Isjuminella =

Isjuminella Temporal range: Late Jurassic, 165–155 Ma

Extinct genus of brachiopods

Isjuminella is a genus of extinct brachiopods, a marine rhynchonellate lampshell in the family Tetrarhynchiidae.

These stationary epifaunal suspension feeders lived in the Middle Jurassic period.
