= Aneboconcha =

Scientific classification
- Domain: Eukaryota
- Kingdom: Animalia
- Phylum: Brachiopoda
- Class: Rhynchonellata
- Order: Terebratulida
- Family: Terebratellidae
- Genus: Aneboconcha; Cooper, 1973

Genus of brachiopods

Aneboconcha is a genus of brachiopods belonging to the family Terebratellidae.

The species of this genus are found in southernmost Southern America.

Species:

- Aneboconcha eichleri (Allan, 1939)
- Aneboconcha obscura Cooper, 1973
- Aneboconcha smithi (Martens & Pfeffer, 1887)
