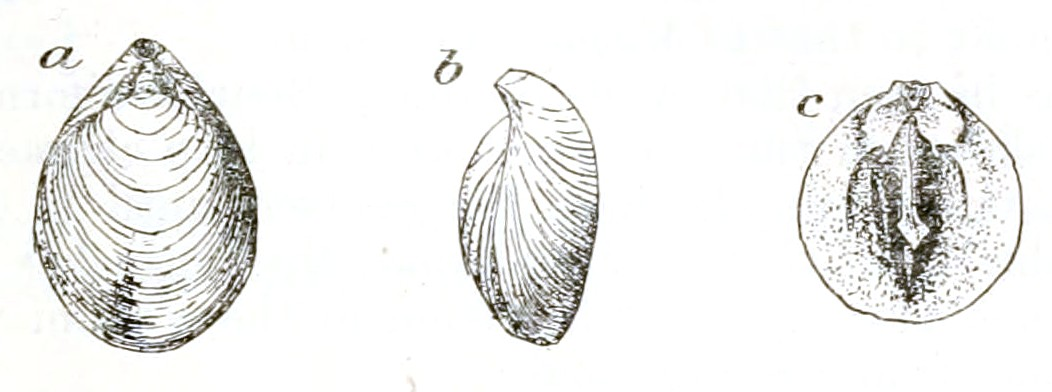
- Magadinella woodsiana

Scientific classification
- Kingdom: Animalia
- Phylum: Brachiopoda
- Class: Rhynchonellata
- Order: Terebratulida
- Family: Terebratellidae
- Genus: Magadinella; Thomson, 1915

= Magadinella =

Genus of brachiopods

Magadinella is a genus of brachiopods belonging to the family Terebratellidae.

The species of this genus are found in Southern Australia.

Species:

- Magadinella mineuri Richardson, 1987
- Magasella woodsiana (Tate, 1880)
