= Zygonaria =

Scientific classification
- Domain: Eukaryota
- Kingdom: Animalia
- Phylum: Brachiopoda
- Class: Rhynchonellata
- Order: Terebratulida
- Family: Terebratulidae
- Genus: Zygonaria; Cooper, 1983

Genus of brachiopods

Zygonaria is a genus of brachiopods belonging to the family Terebratulidae.

The species of this genus are found in Southern Europe.

Species:

- Zygonaria davidsoni (Adams, 1867)
- Zygonaria joloensis (Dall, 1920)
