= Syntomaria =

Scientific classification
- Domain: Eukaryota
- Kingdom: Animalia
- Phylum: Brachiopoda
- Class: Rhynchonellata
- Order: Terebratulida
- Family: Terebratellidae
- Genus: Syntomaria; Cooper, 1982
- Species: S. curiosa

Binomial name
- Syntomaria curiosa Cooper, 1982

Genus of brachiopods

Syntomaria is a monotypic genus of brachiopods belonging to the family Terebratellidae. The only species is Syntomaria curiosa.

The species is found in Eastern Australia and near Southernmost America.
