= Stenosarina =

Scientific classification
- Domain: Eukaryota
- Kingdom: Animalia
- Phylum: Brachiopoda
- Class: Rhynchonellata
- Order: Terebratulida
- Family: Terebratulidae
- Genus: Stenosarina; Cooper, 1977

Genus of brachiopods

Stenosarina is a genus of brachiopods belonging to the family Terebratulidae.

The species of this genus are found in New Zealand and Central Atlantic Ocean.

Species:

- Stenosarina angustata Cooper, 1977
- Stenosarina crosnieri (Cooper, 1983)
- Stenosarina cuneata Cooper, 1979
- Stenosarina davidsoni Logan, 1998
- Stenosarina globosa Laurin, 1997
- Stenosarina lata Laurin, 1997
- Stenosarina nitens Cooper, 1977
- Stenosarina oregonae Cooper, 1977
- Stenosarina parva Cooper, 1977
