= Ebiscothyris =

Scientific classification
- Kingdom: Animalia
- Phylum: Brachiopoda
- Class: Rhynchonellata
- Order: Terebratulida
- Family: Terebratulidae
- Genus: Ebiscothyris; Bitner & Cohen, 2015
- Species: E. bellonensis

Binomial name
- Ebiscothyris bellonensis Bitner & Cohen, 2015

Genus of brachiopods

Ebiscothyris is a monotypic genus of brachiopods belonging to the family Terebratulidae. The only species is Ebiscothyris bellonensis.
