= Neothyris =

Scientific classification
- Domain: Eukaryota
- Kingdom: Animalia
- Phylum: Brachiopoda
- Class: Rhynchonellata
- Order: Terebratulida
- Family: Terebratellidae
- Genus: Neothyris; Douvillé, 1879

Genus of brachiopods

Neothyris is a genus of brachiopods belonging to the family Terebratellidae.

The species of this genus are found mostly in New Zealand.

Species:

- Neothyris lenticularis (Deshayes, 1839)
- Neothyris ovalis (Hutton, 1886)
- †Neothyris obtusa (Neall, 1972)
- Neothyris dawsoni (Neall, 1972)
- †Neothyris rylandae (Craig, 1999)
- Neothyris westpacifica (Zezina, 2001)
