= Dolichozygus =

Scientific classification
- Domain: Eukaryota
- Kingdom: Animalia
- Phylum: Brachiopoda
- Class: Rhynchonellata
- Order: Terebratulida
- Family: Terebratulidae
- Genus: Dolichozygus; Cooper, 1983
- Species: D. stearnsii

Binomial name
- Dolichozygus stearnsii (Dall & Pilsbry, 1891)

Genus of brachiopods

Dolichozygus is a monotypic genus of brachiopods belonging to the family Terebratulidae. The only species is Dolichozygus stearnsii.
