= Pirothyris =

Scientific classification
- Domain: Eukaryota
- Kingdom: Animalia
- Phylum: Brachiopoda
- Class: Rhynchonellata
- Order: Terebratulida
- Family: Terebratellidae
- Genus: Pirothyris; Thomson, 1927
- Species: P. vercoi

Binomial name
- Pirothyris vercoi (Blochmann, 1910)

Genus of brachiopods

Pirothyris is a monotypic genus of brachiopods belonging to the family Terebratellidae. The only species is Pirothyris vercoi.

The species is found in Southern Australia.
