= Erymnia =

Scientific classification
- Domain: Eukaryota
- Kingdom: Animalia
- Phylum: Brachiopoda
- Class: Rhynchonellata
- Order: Terebratulida
- Family: Terebratulidae
- Genus: Erymnia; Cooper, 1977

Genus of brachiopods

Erymnia is a genus of brachiopods belonging to the family Terebratulidae.

The species of this genus are found in Caribbean.

Species:

- Erymnia angustata Cooper, 1977
- Erymnia augusta Cooper, 1977
- Erymnia muralifera Cooper, 1977
