= Tichosina =

Scientific classification
- Domain: Eukaryota
- Kingdom: Animalia
- Phylum: Brachiopoda
- Class: Rhynchonellata
- Order: Terebratulida
- Family: Terebratulidae
- Genus: Tichosina; Cooper, 1977

Genus of brachiopods

Tichosina is a genus of brachiopods belonging to the family Terebratulidae.

The species of this genus are found in Southern America.

== Species ==
Species:

- Tichosina abrupta Cooper, 1977
- Tichosina bahamiensis Cooper, 1977
- Tichosina barschi Cooper, 1934
