= Aerothyris =

Scientific classification
- Domain: Eukaryota
- Kingdom: Animalia
- Phylum: Brachiopoda
- Class: Rhynchonellata
- Order: Terebratulida
- Family: Terebratellidae
- Genus: Aerothyris; Allan, 1939

Genus of brachiopods

Aerothyris is a genus of brachiopods belonging to the family Terebratellidae.

The species of this genus are found in southernmost South Hemisphere.

Species:

- Aerothyris fragilis Smith, 1907
- Aerothyris kerguelenensis (Davidson, 1878)
- Aerothyris kerguelensis (Davidson, 1878)
- Aerothyris macquariensis (Thomson, 1918)
- Aerothyris maquariensis Thomson, 1918
