= Dallithyris =

Scientific classification
- Domain: Eukaryota
- Kingdom: Animalia
- Phylum: Brachiopoda
- Class: Rhynchonellata
- Order: Terebratulida
- Family: Terebratulidae
- Genus: Dallithyris; Muir-Wood, 1959

Genus of brachiopods

Dallithyris is a genus of brachiopods belonging to the family Terebratulidae.

The genus has almost cosmopolitan distribution.

Species:

- Dallithyris augustata Cooper, 1977
- Dallithyris cernica Crosse, 1873
- Dallithyris dubia Cooper, 1981
- Dallithyris elongata Cooper, 1977
- Dallithyris fulva (Blochmann, 1913)
- Dallithyris globosa Laurin, 1997
- Dallithyris lata Laurin, 1997
- Dallithyris murrayi Muir-Wood, 1959
- Dallithyris nitens Cooper, 1977
- Dallithyris oregonae Cooper, 1977
- Dallithyris pacifica Bitner, 2006
- Dallithyris parva Cooper, 1977
- Dallithyris sphenoidea Philippi, 1844
- Dallithyris sternsi Dall & Pilsbry, 1891
- Dallithyris tahitiensis Bitner, 2014
