= Acrobrochus =

Scientific classification
- Domain: Eukaryota
- Kingdom: Animalia
- Phylum: Brachiopoda
- Class: Rhynchonellata
- Order: Terebratulida
- Family: Terebratellidae
- Genus: Acrobrochus; Cooper, 1983

Genus of brachiopods

Acrobrochus is a genus of brachiopods belonging to the family Terebratellidae.

The species of this genus are found in southernmost South Hemisphere.

Species:

- Acrobrochus blochmanni (Jackson, 1912)
- Acrobrochus marotiriensis Bitner, 2007
- Acrobrochus vema (Cooper, 1973)
