= Hillerella =

Scientific classification
- Domain: Eukaryota
- Kingdom: Animalia
- Phylum: Brachiopoda
- Class: Rhynchonellata
- Order: Terebratulida
- Family: Kraussinidae
- Genus: Hillerella; Simon, Logan & Mottequin, 2016
- Species: H. bisepta

Binomial name
- Hillerella bisepta Simon, Logan & Mottequin, 2016

Genus of brachiopods

Hillerella is a monotypic genus of brachiopods belonging to the family Kraussinidae. The only species is Hillerella bisepta.

The species is found in Indo-Pacific waters.
