= Notozyga =

Scientific classification
- Kingdom: Animalia
- Phylum: Brachiopoda
- Class: Rhynchonellata
- Order: Terebratulida
- Family: Chlidonophoridae
- Genus: Notozyga; Cooper, 1977

Genus of brachiopods

Notozyga is a genus of brachiopods belonging to the family Chlidonophoridae.

The species of this genus are found in New Zealand and South African Republic.

Species:

- Notozyga gracilis Hiller, 1986
- Notozyga lowenstami Cooper, 1977
- Notozyga maxwelli Hiller, 2011
