= Ecnomiosa =

Scientific classification
- Domain: Eukaryota
- Kingdom: Animalia
- Phylum: Brachiopoda
- Class: Rhynchonellata
- Order: Terebratulida
- Family: Kingenidae
- Genus: Ecnomiosa; Cooper, 1977

Genus of brachiopods

Ecnomiosa is a genus of brachiopods belonging to the family Kingenidae.

The species of this genus are found in New Zealand and Caribbean.

Species:

- Ecnomiosa gerda Cooper, 1977
- Ecnomiosa inexpectata Cooper, 1981
