= Simpliciforma =

Scientific classification
- Domain: Eukaryota
- Kingdom: Animalia
- Phylum: Brachiopoda
- Class: Rhynchonellata
- Order: Terebratulida
- Genus: Simpliciforma; Bitner & Zezina, 2013
- Species: S. profunda

Binomial name
- Simpliciforma profunda Bitner & Zezina, 2013

Genus of brachiopods

Simpliciforma is a monotypic genus of brachiopods belonging to the order Terebratulida, family unassigned. The only species is Simpliciforma profunda.

The species is found in northeastern Pacific Ocean.
