= Simplicithyris =

Scientific classification
- Domain: Eukaryota
- Kingdom: Animalia
- Phylum: Brachiopoda
- Class: Rhynchonellata
- Order: Terebratulida
- Genus: Simplicithyris; Zezina, 1976

Genus of brachiopods

Simplicithyris is a genus of brachiopods belonging to the order Terebratulida, family unassigned.

The species of this genus are found in Kurilo-Kamchatka region.

Species:

- Simplicithyris japonica (Dall, 1920)
- Simplicithyris kurilensis Zezina, 1976
