= Fosteria spinosa =

Scientific classification
- Domain: Eukaryota
- Kingdom: Animalia
- Phylum: Brachiopoda
- Class: Rhynchonellata
- Order: Terebratulida
- Family: Terebratellidae
- Genus: Fosteria; Zezina, 1980
- Species: F. spinosa

Binomial name
- Fosteria spinosa (Foster, 1974)

Species of brachiopod

Fosteria is a monotypic genus of brachiopods belonging to the family Terebratellidae. The only species is Fosteria spinosa.

The species is found in Antarctica.
