= Campages =

Scientific classification
- Domain: Eukaryota
- Kingdom: Animalia
- Phylum: Brachiopoda
- Class: Rhynchonellata
- Order: Terebratulida
- Family: Dallinidae
- Genus: Campages; Hedley, 1905

Genus of brachiopods

Campages is a genus of brachiopods belonging to the family Dallinidae.

The species of this genus are found in Malesia and Australia.

Species:

- Campages asthenia (Dall, 1920)
- Campages dubius Hatai, 1940
- Campages furcifera (Hedley, 1905)
- Campages japonica (Hatai, 1940)
- Campages mariae (Adams, 1860)
- Campages nipponensis Yabe & Hatai, 1935
- Campages ovalis Bitner, 2008
- Campages pacifica (Hatai, 1940)
