= Melvicalathis =

Scientific classification
- Domain: Eukaryota
- Kingdom: Animalia
- Phylum: Brachiopoda
- Class: Rhynchonellata
- Order: Terebratulida
- Family: Chlidonophoridae
- Genus: Melvicalathis; Lee, Lüter & Zezina, 2008
- Species: M. macroctena

Binomial name
- Melvicalathis macroctena Zezina, 1981)

Genus of brachiopods

Melvicalathis is a monotypic genus of brachiopods belonging to the family Chlidonophoridae. The only species is Melvicalathis macroctena.

The species is found in southern Pacific Ocean.
