= Murravia =

Scientific classification
- Domain: Eukaryota
- Kingdom: Animalia
- Phylum: Brachiopoda
- Class: Rhynchonellata
- Order: Terebratulida
- Family: Cancellothyrididae
- Genus: Murravia; Thomson, 1916

Genus of brachiopods

Murravia is a genus of brachiopods belonging to the family Cancellothyrididae.

The species of this genus are found on the coasts of Australia.

Species:

- Murravia catinuliformis (Tate, 1896)
- Murravia exarata (Verco, 1910)
- Murravia fosteri Bitner, 1996
