= Holobrachia =

Scientific classification
- Domain: Eukaryota
- Kingdom: Animalia
- Phylum: Brachiopoda
- Class: Rhynchonellata
- Order: Terebratulida
- Genus: Holobrachia; Zezina, 2001
- Species: H. vietnamica

Binomial name
- Holobrachia vietnamica Zezina, 2001

Genus of brachiopods

Holobrachia is a monotypic genus of brachiopods belonging to the order Terebratulida, family unknown. The only species is Holobrachia vietnamica.

The species is found in near Vietnam.
