= Annuloplatidia =

Scientific classification
- Kingdom: Animalia
- Phylum: Brachiopoda
- Class: Rhynchonellata
- Order: Terebratulida
- Family: Platidiidae
- Genus: Annuloplatidia; Zezina, 1981

Genus of brachiopods

Annuloplatidia is a genus of brachiopods belonging to the family Platidiidae.

The species of this genus are found in Northern America.

Species:

- Annuloplatidia annulata (Atkins, 1959)
- Annuloplatidia curiosa Bitner, 2014
- Annuloplatidia horni (Gabb, 1861)
- Annuloplatidia indopacifica Zezina, 1981
- Annuloplatidia richeri Bitner, 2009
