= Lenticellaria =

Scientific classification
- Domain: Eukaryota
- Kingdom: Animalia
- Phylum: Brachiopoda
- Class: Rhynchonellata
- Order: Terebratulida
- Family: Kraussinidae
- Genus: Lenticellaria; Simon, Logan & Mottequin, 2016

Genus of brachiopods

Lenticellaria is a genus of brachiopods belonging to the family Kraussinidae.

The species of this genus are found in Malesia.

Species:

- Lenticellaria gregoryi Simon, Logan & Mottequin, 2016
- Lenticellaria marerubris Simon, Logan & Mottequin, 2016
