= Acrobelesia =

Scientific classification
- Domain: Eukaryota
- Kingdom: Animalia
- Phylum: Brachiopoda
- Class: Rhynchonellata
- Order: Terebratulida
- Family: Dyscoliidae
- Genus: Acrobelesia; Cooper, 1983
- Species: A. cooperi

Binomial name
- Acrobelesia cooperi (d'Hondt, 1976)

Genus of brachiopods

Acrobelesia is a monotypic genus of brachiopods belonging to the family Dyscoliidae. The only species is Acrobelesia cooperi.

The species is found in Europe.
