= Cancellothyris =

Scientific classification
- Kingdom: Animalia
- Phylum: Brachiopoda
- Class: Rhynchonellata
- Order: Terebratulida
- Family: Cancellothyrididae
- Genus: Cancellothyris; Thomson, 1926

Genus of brachiopods

Cancellothyris is a genus of brachiopods belonging to the family Cancellothyrididae.

The species of this genus are found in Australia and Africa.

Species:

- Cancellothyris africana (Elliott, 1954)
- Cancellothyris ascotensis (Craig, 1999)
- Cancellothyris hedleyi (Finlay, 1927)
- Cancellothyris platys (Brunton & Hiller, 1990)
