= Tythothyris =

Scientific classification
- Domain: Eukaryota
- Kingdom: Animalia
- Phylum: Brachiopoda
- Class: Rhynchonellata
- Order: Terebratulida
- Family: Terebrataliidae
- Genus: Tythothyris; Zezina, 1979
- Species: T. rosimarginata

Binomial name
- Tythothyris rosimarginata Zezina, 1979

Genus of brachiopods

Tythothyris is a monotypic genus of brachiopods belonging to the family Terebrataliidae. The only species is Tythothyris rosimarginata.

The species is found in Kuril Islands.
