= Nanacalathis =

Scientific classification
- Kingdom: Animalia
- Phylum: Brachiopoda
- Class: Rhynchonellata
- Order: Terebratulida
- Family: Chlidonophoridae
- Genus: Nanacalathis; Zezina, 1981

Genus of brachiopods

Nanacalathis is a genus of brachiopods belonging to the family Chlidonophoridae.

The species of this genus are found in Atlantic Ocean.

Species:

- Nanacalathis atlantica Zezina, 1991
- Nanacalathis minuta Zezina, 1981
