= Rectocalathis =

Scientific classification
- Domain: Eukaryota
- Kingdom: Animalia
- Phylum: Brachiopoda
- Class: Rhynchonellata
- Order: Terebratulida
- Family: Chlidonophoridae
- Genus: Rectocalathis; Seidel & Lüter, 2014
- Species: R. schemmgregoryi

Binomial name
- Rectocalathis schemmgregoryi Seidel & Lüter, 2014

Genus of brachiopods

Rectocalathis is a monotypic genus of brachiopods belonging to the family Chlidonophoridae. The only species is Rectocalathis schemmgregoryi.
