= Pumilus antiquatus =

Conservation status
- Nationally Critical (NZ TCS)

Scientific classification
- Domain: Eukaryota
- Kingdom: Animalia
- Phylum: Brachiopoda
- Class: Rhynchonellata
- Order: Terebratulida
- Family: Kraussinidae
- Genus: Pumilus; Atkins, 1958
- Species: P. antiquatus

Binomial name
- Pumilus antiquatus Atkins, 1958

Species of brachiopod

Pumilus is a monotypic genus of brachiopods belonging to the family Kraussinidae. The only species is Pumilus antiquatus.

The species is found in New Zealand.
