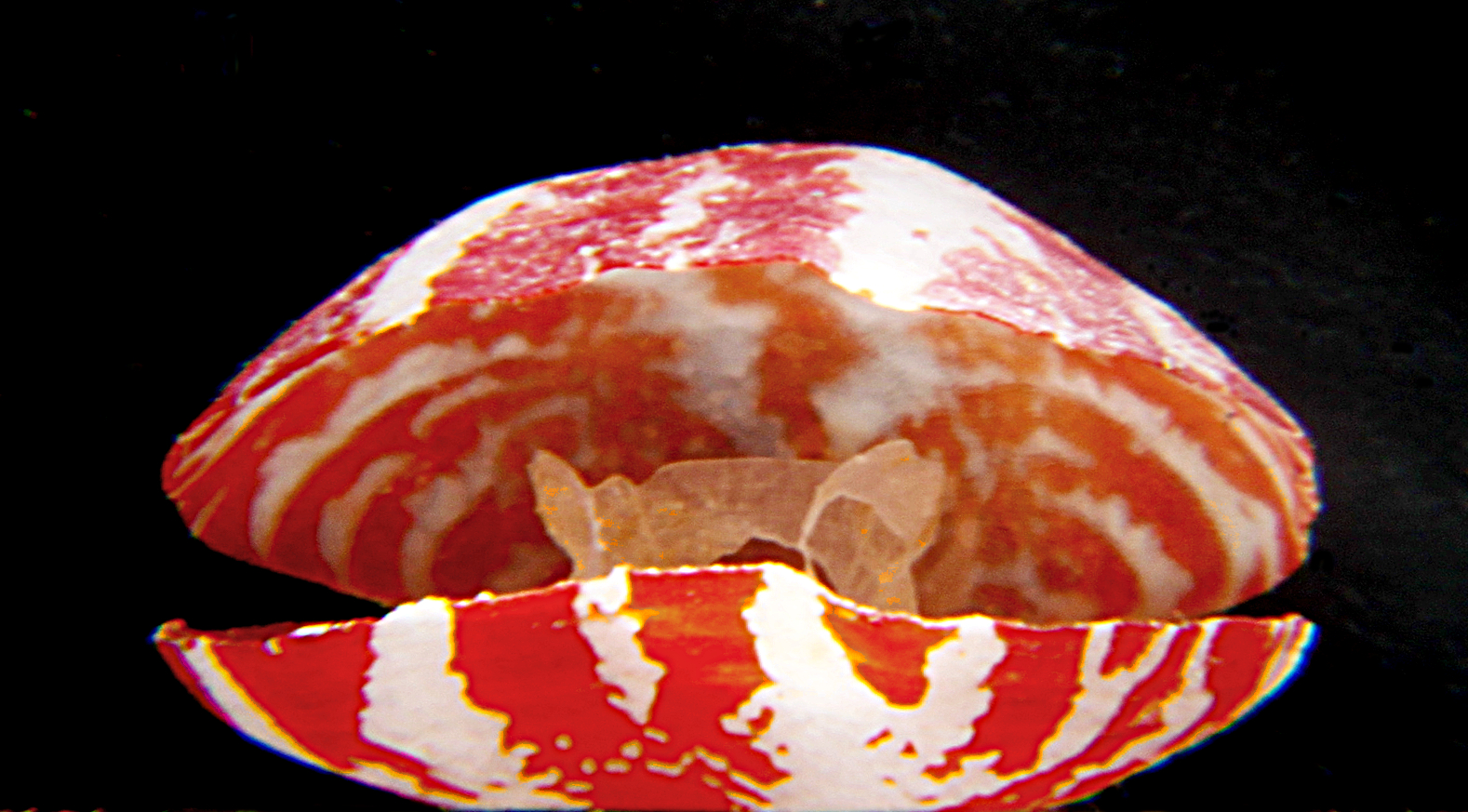
- Frenulina sanguinolenta, internal view, 11mm wide

Scientific classification
- Domain: Eukaryota
- Kingdom: Animalia
- Phylum: Brachiopoda
- Class: Rhynchonellata
- Order: Terebratulida
- Family: Frenulinidae
- Genus: Frenulina; Dall, 1894

Species
- F. sanguinolenta (Gmelin, 1790) type = Anomia sanguinolenta, Megerlia sanguinea; F. cruenta Cooper, 1973; F. mauiensis Dall, 1920

= Frenulina =

Frenulina Temporal range: recent

Genus of brachiopods

Frenulina is an extant genus of brachiopods, known from shallow waters in the warmer parts of the Pacific and Indian Oceans. Its shell is biconvex, rounded pentagonal in profile, and dependent on the species scarlet with creamy white radiating stripes of quickly varying width, beige or seldom entirely white. It lives attached by a stalk to a hard underground.

== Species and distribution ==
- Frenulina sanguinolenta has creamy white radiating stripes of quickly varying width on a scarlet shell, or is very rarely entirely white. It is very common in the western Pacific, including Australia, New Caledonia, French Polynesia, Philippines, China, Japan and Hawaii, but also occurs in the Indian Ocean.
- F. cruenta is known from the Indian Ocean.
- F. mauiensis occurs in Hawaii.
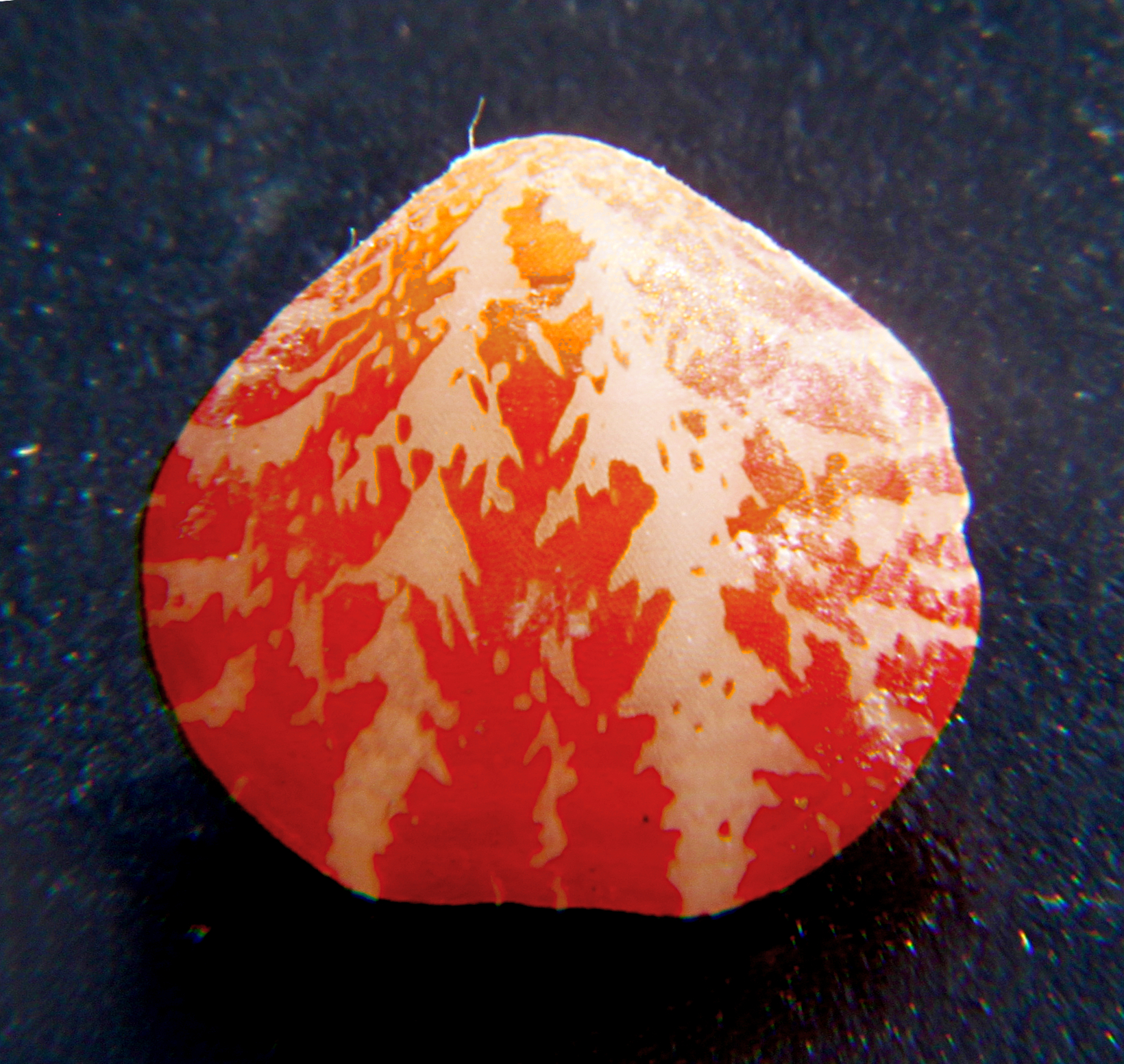
Frenulina sanguinolenta, pedicle valve, 11mm

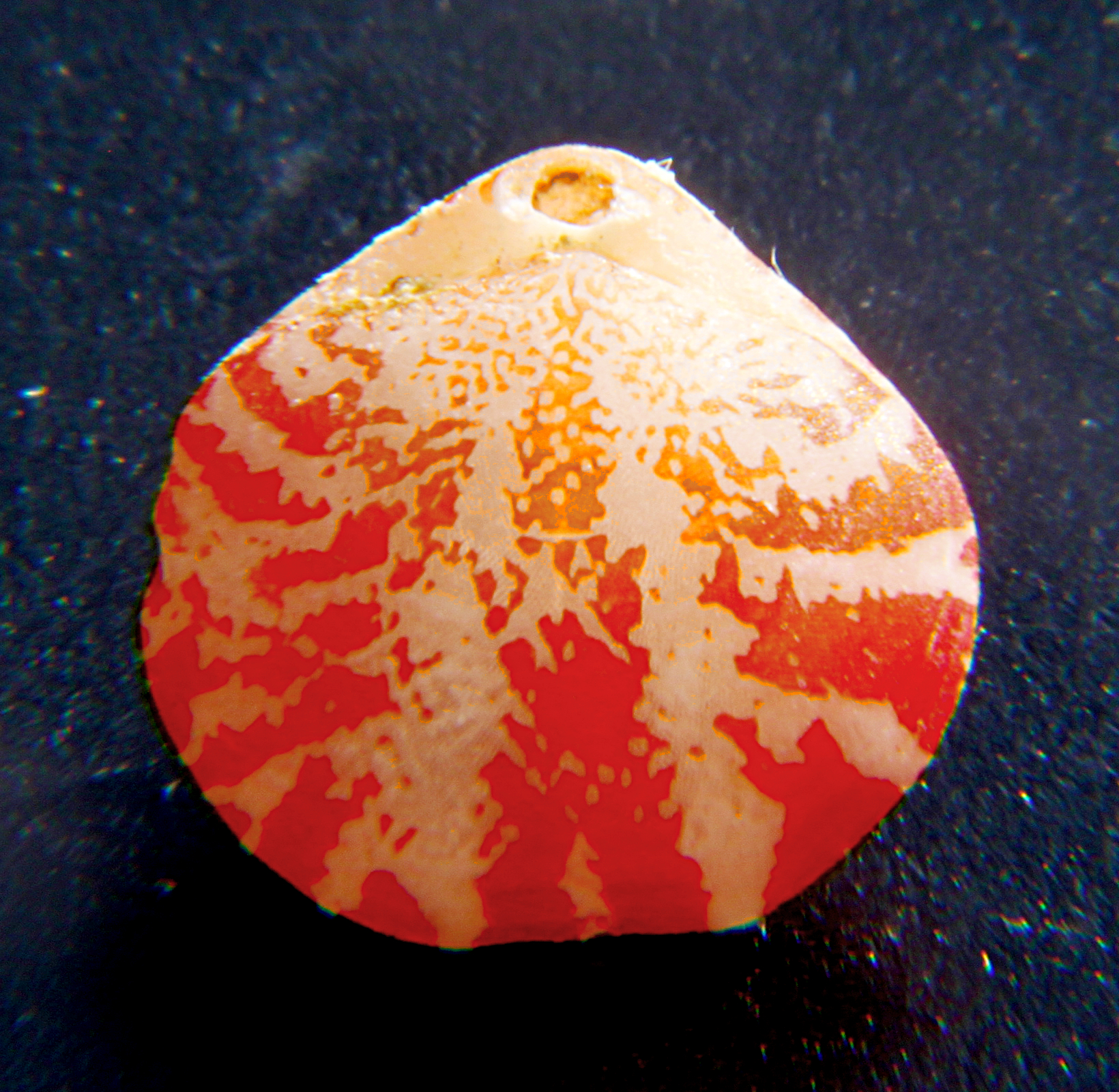
brachial valve

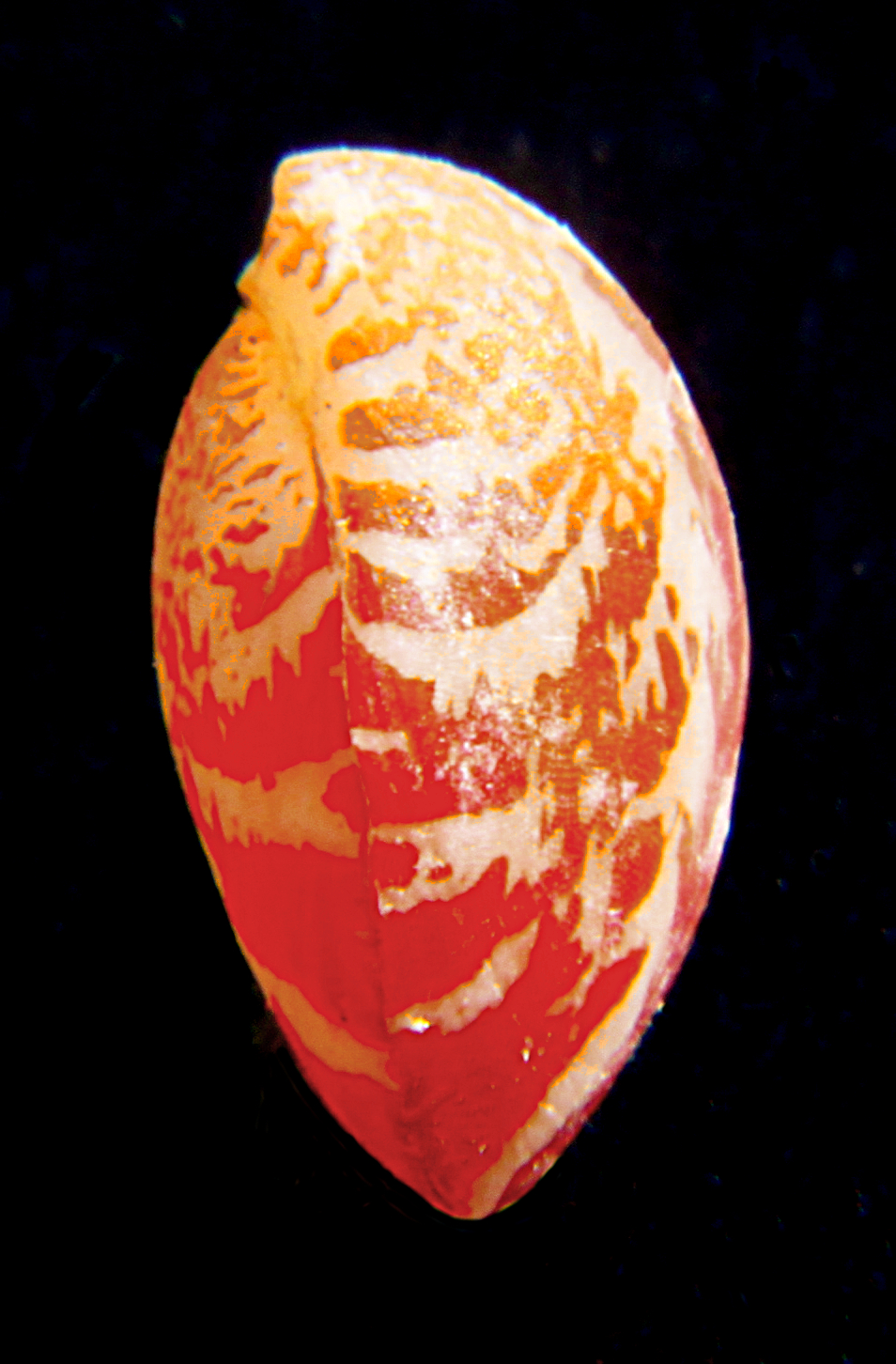
lateral view
