= Bathynanus =

Scientific classification
- Domain: Eukaryota
- Kingdom: Animalia
- Phylum: Brachiopoda
- Class: Rhynchonellata
- Order: Terebratulida
- Family: Chlidonophoridae
- Genus: Bathynanus; Foster, 1974

Genus of brachiopods

Bathynanus is a genus of brachiopods belonging to the family Chlidonophoridae.

The species of this genus are found in Indian and Pacific Ocean.

Species:

- Bathynanus dalli (Davidson, 1878)
- Bathynanus inversus Zezina, 1981
- Bathynanus rhisopodus Zezina, 1981
- Bathynanus rhizopodus Zezina, 1981
- Bathynanus tenuicostatus Foster, 1974
