= Phaneropora =

Scientific classification
- Kingdom: Animalia
- Phylum: Brachiopoda
- Class: Rhynchonellata
- Order: Terebratulida
- Family: Platidiidae
- Genus: Phaneropora; Zezina, 1981

Genus of brachiopods

Phaneropora is a genus of brachiopods belonging to the family Platidiidae.

Species:

- Phaneropora galatheae Zezina, 1981
- Phaneropora ignota (Muir-Wood, 1959)
