= Oceanithyris =

Scientific classification
- Domain: Eukaryota
- Kingdom: Animalia
- Phylum: Brachiopoda
- Class: Rhynchonellata
- Order: Terebratulida
- Family: Dyscoliidae
- Genus: Oceanithyris; Bitner & Zezina, 2013
- Species: O. juveniformis

Binomial name
- Oceanithyris juveniformis Bitner & Zezina, 2013

Genus of brachiopods

Oceanithyris is a monotypic genus of brachiopods belonging to the family Dyscoliidae. The only species is Oceanithyris juveniformis.

The species is found in northeastern Pacific Ocean.
