= Megerella =

Scientific classification
- Domain: Eukaryota
- Kingdom: Animalia
- Phylum: Brachiopoda
- Class: Rhynchonellata
- Order: Terebratulida
- Family: Kraussinidae
- Genus: Megerella; Bitner & Logan, 2016
- Species: M. hilleri

Binomial name
- Megerella hilleri Bitner & Logan, 2016

Genus of brachiopods

Megerella is a monotypic genus of brachiopods belonging to the family Kraussinidae. The only species is Megerella hilleri.
