= Striarina =

Scientific classification
- Domain: Eukaryota
- Kingdom: Animalia
- Phylum: Brachiopoda
- Class: Rhynchonellata
- Order: Rhynchonellida
- Family: Basiliolidae
- Genus: Striarina; Cooper, 1973
- Species: S. valdiviae

Binomial name
- Striarina valdiviae (Helmcke, 1940)

Genus of brachiopods

Striarina is a monotypic genus of brachiopods belonging to the family Basiliolidae. The only species is Striarina valdiviae.

The species is found in the Indian Ocean.
