= Basiliolella =

Scientific classification
- Domain: Eukaryota
- Kingdom: Animalia
- Phylum: Brachiopoda
- Class: Rhynchonellata
- Order: Rhynchonellida
- Family: Basiliolidae
- Genus: Basiliolella d'Hondt, 1987

Genus of brachiopods

Basiliolella is a genus of brachiopods belonging to the family Basiliolidae.

The species of this genus are found in Australia.

Species:

- Basiliolella colurnus (Hedley, 1905)
- Basiliolella grayi (Woodward, 1855)
