= Thaumatosia =

Scientific classification
- Domain: Eukaryota
- Kingdom: Animalia
- Phylum: Brachiopoda
- Class: Rhynchonellata
- Order: Terebratulida
- Suborder: Terebratellidina
- Superfamily: Megathyridoidea
- Family: Thaumatosiidae; Cooper, 1973
- Genus: Thaumatosia; Cooper, 1973
- Species: T. anomala

Binomial name
- Thaumatosia anomala Cooper, 1973

Genus of brachiopods

Thaumatosia is a monotypic genus of brachiopod belonging to the family Thaumatosiidae. The only species is Thaumatosia anomala.

The species is found in Indian Ocean.
