= Pemphixina =

Scientific classification
- Domain: Eukaryota
- Kingdom: Animalia
- Phylum: Brachiopoda
- Class: Rhynchonellata
- Order: Rhynchonellida
- Family: Hemithirididae
- Genus: Pemphixina; Cooper, 1981
- Species: P. pyxidata

Binomial name
- Pemphixina pyxidata (Davidson, 1880)

Genus of brachiopods

Pemphixina is a monotypic genus of brachiopods belonging to the family Hemithirididae. The only species is Pemphixina pyxidata.

The species is found in southern part of Indian Ocean.
