= Neorhynchia =

Scientific classification
- Domain: Eukaryota
- Kingdom: Animalia
- Phylum: Brachiopoda
- Class: Rhynchonellata
- Order: Rhynchonellida
- Family: Frieleiidae
- Genus: Neorhynchia; Thomson, 1915
- Species: N. strebeli

Binomial name
- Neorhynchia strebeli (Dall, 1908)

Genus of brachiopods

Neorhynchia is a monotypic genus of brachiopods belonging to the family Frieleiidae. The only species is Neorhynchia strebeli.

The species is found in Pacific Ocean.
