= Tethyrhynchia =

Scientific classification
- Domain: Eukaryota
- Kingdom: Animalia
- Phylum: Brachiopoda
- Class: Rhynchonellata
- Order: Rhynchonellida
- Superfamily: Norelloidea
- Family: Tethyrhynchiidae; Logan, 1994
- Genus: Tethyrhynchia; Logan, 1994
- Species: T. mediterranea

Binomial name
- Tethyrhynchia mediterranea Logan, 1994

Genus of brachiopods

Tethyrhynchia is a monotypic genus of brachiopods belonging to the monotypic family Tethyrhynchiidae. The only species is Tethyrhynchia mediterranea.

The species is found in the Mediterranean Sea.
