= Manithyris =

Scientific classification
- Domain: Eukaryota
- Kingdom: Animalia
- Phylum: Brachiopoda
- Class: Rhynchonellata
- Order: Rhynchonellida
- Family: Frieleiidae
- Genus: Manithyris; Foster, 1974
- Species: M. rossi

Binomial name
- Manithyris rossi Foster, 1974

Genus of brachiopods

Manithyris is a monotypic genus of brachiopods belonging to the family Frieleiidae. The only species is Manithyris rossi.

The species is found in Antarctica.
