= Rhytirhynchia =

Scientific classification
- Domain: Eukaryota
- Kingdom: Animalia
- Phylum: Brachiopoda
- Class: Rhynchonellata
- Order: Rhynchonellida
- Family: Basiliolidae
- Genus: Rhytirhynchia; Cooper, 1957

Genus of brachiopods

Rhytirhynchia is a genus of brachiopods belonging to the family Basiliolidae.

Species:

- Rhytirhynchia hataiana Cooper, 1957
- Rhytirhynchia sladeni (Dall, 1910)
