= Acanthobasiliola =

Scientific classification
- Domain: Eukaryota
- Kingdom: Animalia
- Phylum: Brachiopoda
- Class: Rhynchonellata
- Order: Rhynchonellida
- Family: Basiliolidae
- Genus: Acanthobasiliola; Zezina, 1981
- Species: A. doederleini

Binomial name
- Acanthobasiliola doederleini (Davidson, 1886)

Genus of brachiopods

Acanthobasiliola is a monotypic genus of brachiopods belonging to the family Basiliolidae. The only species is Acanthobasiliola doederleini.

The species is found in Malesia.
