= Basiliola =

Scientific classification
- Domain: Eukaryota
- Kingdom: Animalia
- Phylum: Brachiopoda
- Class: Rhynchonellata
- Order: Rhynchonellida
- Family: Basiliolidae
- Genus: Basiliola; Dall, 1908

Genus of brachiopods

Basiliola is a genus of brachiopods belonging to the family Basiliolidae. The species of this genus are found in the Pacific Ocean and near Madagascar.

Species:

- Basiliola arnaudi Cooper, 1981
- Basiliola beecheri (Dall, 1895)
- Basiliola elongata Cooper, 1959
- Basiliola lucida (Gould, 1862)
- Basiliola minuta Bitner, 1996
- Basiliola nitida Cooper, 1957
- Basiliola pompholyx Dall, 1920
- Basiliola roddai Cooper, 1978
- Basiliola strasfogeli Cooper, 1978
