= Pelagodiscus =

Scientific classification
- Domain: Eukaryota
- Kingdom: Animalia
- Phylum: Brachiopoda
- Order: Discinida
- Family: Discinidae
- Genus: Pelagodiscus; Dall, 1908
- Species: P. atlanticus

Binomial name
- Pelagodiscus atlanticus (King, 1868)

Genus of brachiopods

Pelagodiscus is a monospecific genus of discinid brachiopods. Silica tablets leave a distinctive tesselating imprint on the inner surface of its shell.
