= Neoancistrocrania =

Scientific classification
- Domain: Eukaryota
- Kingdom: Animalia
- Phylum: Brachiopoda
- Class: Craniata
- Order: Craniida
- Family: Craniidae
- Genus: Neoancistrocrania; Laurin, 1992
- Species: N. norfolki

Binomial name
- Neoancistrocrania norfolki Laurin, 1992

Genus of brachiopods

Neoancistrocrania is a monotypic genus of brachiopods belonging to the family Craniidae. The only species is Neoancistrocrania norfolki.

The species is found in near Eastern Australia.
