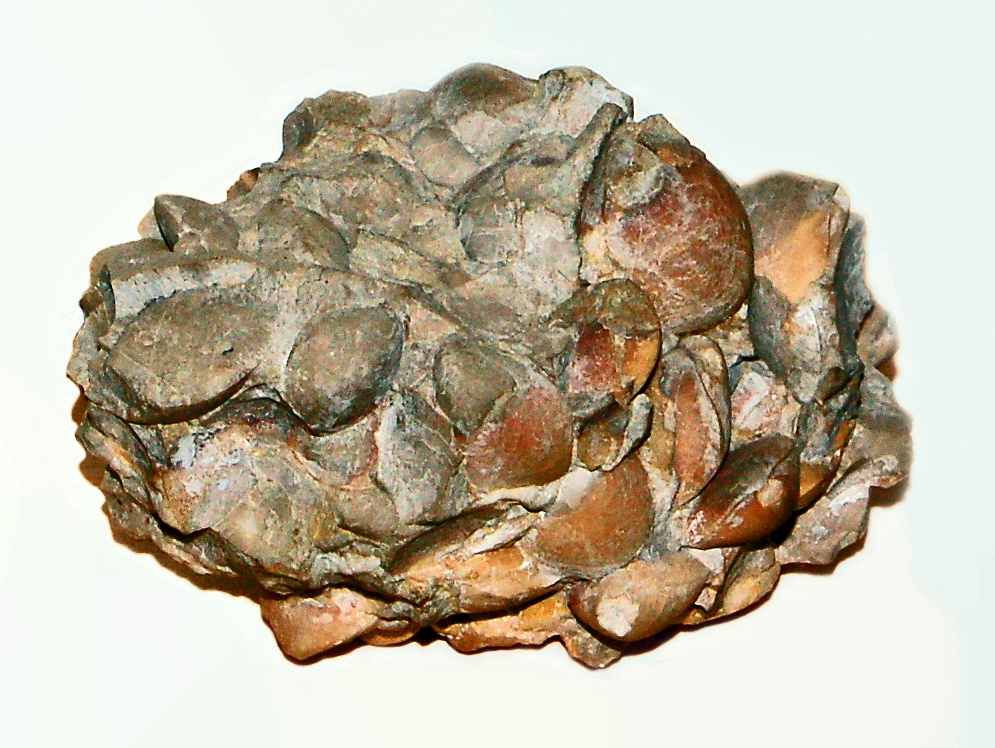
- Terebratula sp. - Triassic from Bolzano, Italy

Scientific classification
- Kingdom: Animalia
- Phylum: Brachiopoda
- Class: Rhynchonellata
- Order: Terebratulida
- Suborder: Terebratulidina
- Superfamily: Terebratuloidea
- Family: Terebratulidae; Gray, 1840

Subfamilies
- Cheirothyrinae; Dallithyridinae; Dictyothyrinae; Gryphinae; Liothyrina; Loboidothyrinae; Lobothyrinae; Plicatoriinae; Seymourinae; Terebratulinae; Tichosininae

= Terebratulidae =

Terebratulidae Temporal range: Late Devonian - Recent

Family of brachiopods

Terebratulidae is a family of brachiopods with a fossil record dating back to the Late Devonian. It is subdivided into 11 subfamilies.
