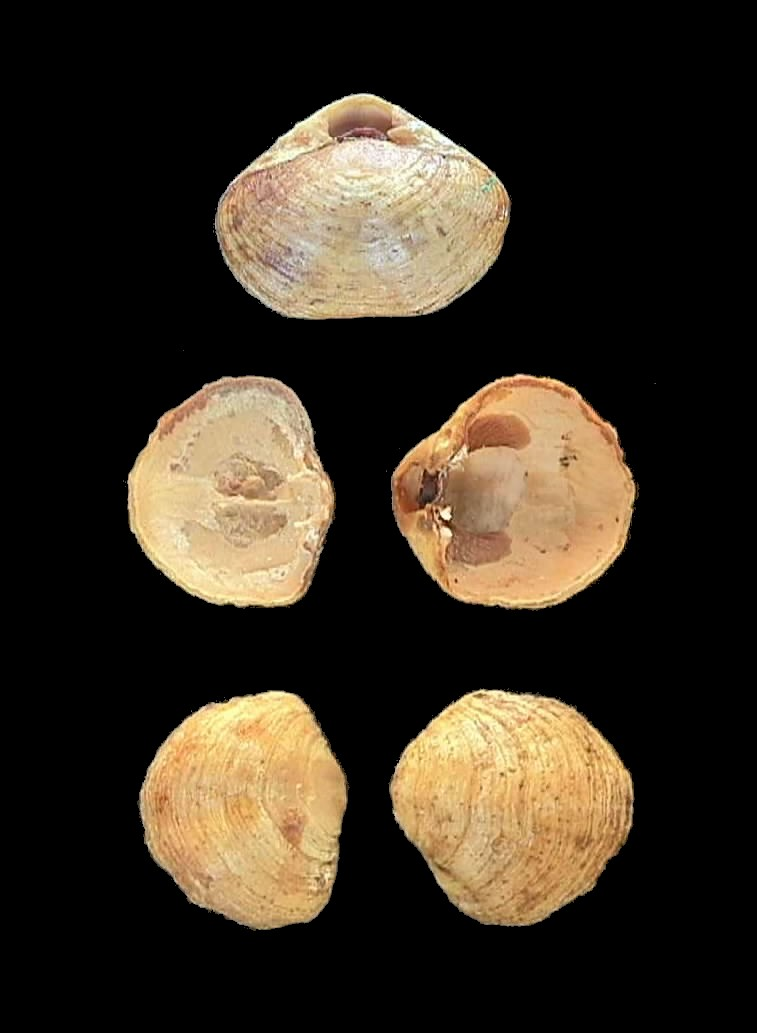
- Terebratella sanguinea

Scientific classification
- Kingdom: Animalia
- Phylum: Brachiopoda
- Class: Rhynchonellata
- Order: Terebratulida
- Suborder: Terebratellidina
- Superfamily: Terebratelloidea
- Family: Terebratellidae; King, 1850

Subfamilies
- Adnatidinae; Anakineticinae; Chathamithyris; Magadinae; Magellaniinae; Neothyridinae; Stethothyridinae; Terebratellinae

= Terebratellidae =

Terebratellidae Temporal range: Jurassic - present

Family of brachiopods

Terebratellidae is an extant family of brachiopods with a fossil record dating back to the Jurassic.
