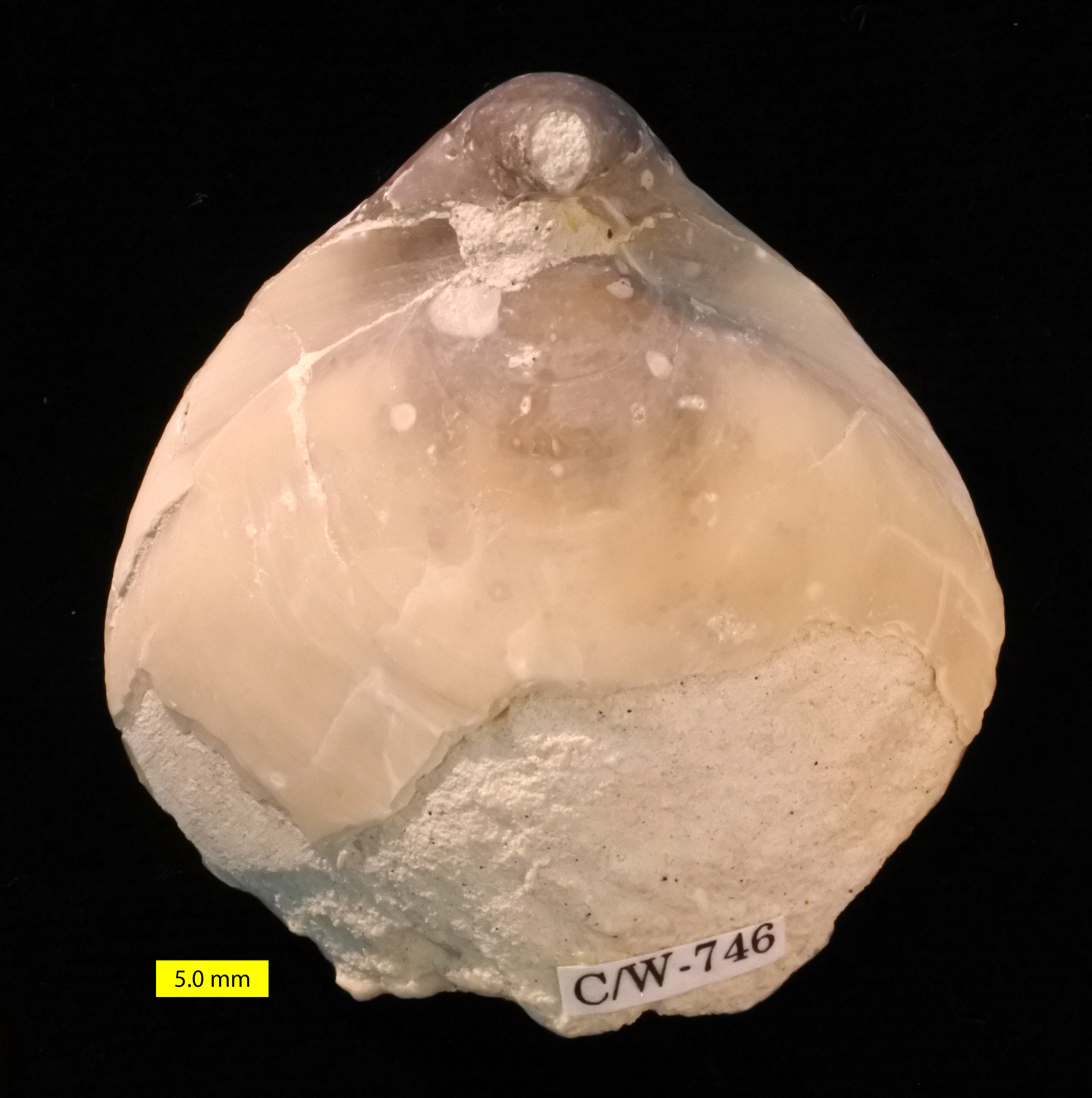
- Terebratulid brachiopod from the Campanian (Upper Cretaceous) of southwestern France.

Scientific classification
- Domain: Eukaryota
- Kingdom: Animalia
- Phylum: Brachiopoda
- Class: Rhynchonellata
- Order: Terebratulida; Waagen, 1883

Suborders
- See text

= Terebratulida =

Terebratulida Temporal range: Silurian–present

Order of brachiopods

Terebratulids are one of only three living orders of articulate brachiopods, the others being the Rhynchonellida and the Thecideida. Craniida and Lingulida include living brachiopods, but are inarticulates. The name, Terebratula, may be derived from the Latin "terebra", meaning "hole-borer". The perceived resemblance of terebratulid shells to ancient Roman oil lamps gave the brachiopods their common name "lamp shell".

Terebratulids typically have biconvex shells that are usually ovoid to circular in outline. They can be either smooth or have radial ribbing. The lophophore support is loop shaped in contrast to the spiralia of similar looking spiriferids. Terebratulids are also distinguished by a very short hinge line, and the shell is punctate in microstructure. There is a circular pedicle opening, or foramen, located in the beak.

Terebratulids may have evolved from Atrypids during the early or Middle Silurian. Early genera were almost circular to elongate-oval, with smooth or finely costate shells. During the Cretaceous and Tertiary periods, many shells became coarsely plicate.

== Classification ==
- Suborder Terebratellidina
  - Superfamily Kraussinoidea
  - Superfamily Laqueoidea
  - Superfamily Megathyridoidea
  - Superfamily Platidioidea
  - Superfamily Terebratelloidea
    - Family Dallinidae
    - Family Ecnomiosidae
    - Family Terebratellidae
    - Family Thaumatosiidae
  - Superfamily Zeillerioidea
  - Superfamily Bouchardioidea
  - Superfamily Gwynioidea
  - Superfamily Kingenoidea
  - Superfamily Incertae sedis
    - Family Tythothyrididae
- Suborder Terebratulidina
  - Superfamily Cancellothyroidea
    - Family Cancellothyrididae
    - Family Chlidonophoridae
    - Family Cnismatocentridae
  - Superfamily Dyscoloidea
  - Superfamily Terebratuloidea
    - Family Gryphidae
    - Family Tichosidae
    - Family Terebratulidae

Extinct Superfamilies

  - Superfamily Dielasmatoidea †
  - Superfamily Cryptonelloidea †
  - Superfamily Loboidothyridoidea †
  - Superfamily Stryingocephaloidea †

== Gallery ==
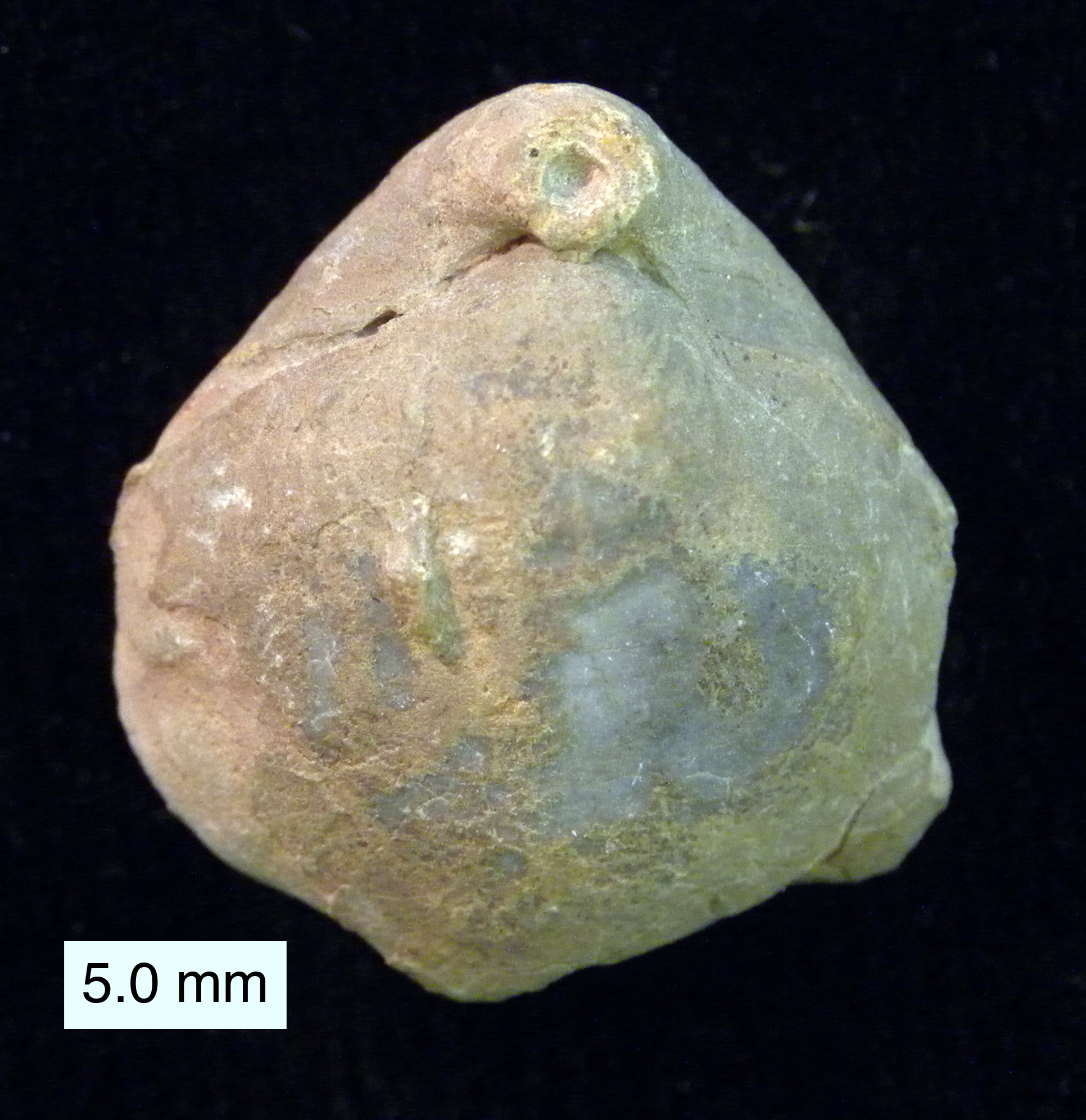
Coenothyris oweni from the Middle Triassic (Anisian) lower Saharonim Formation, Har Gevanim, southern Israel.

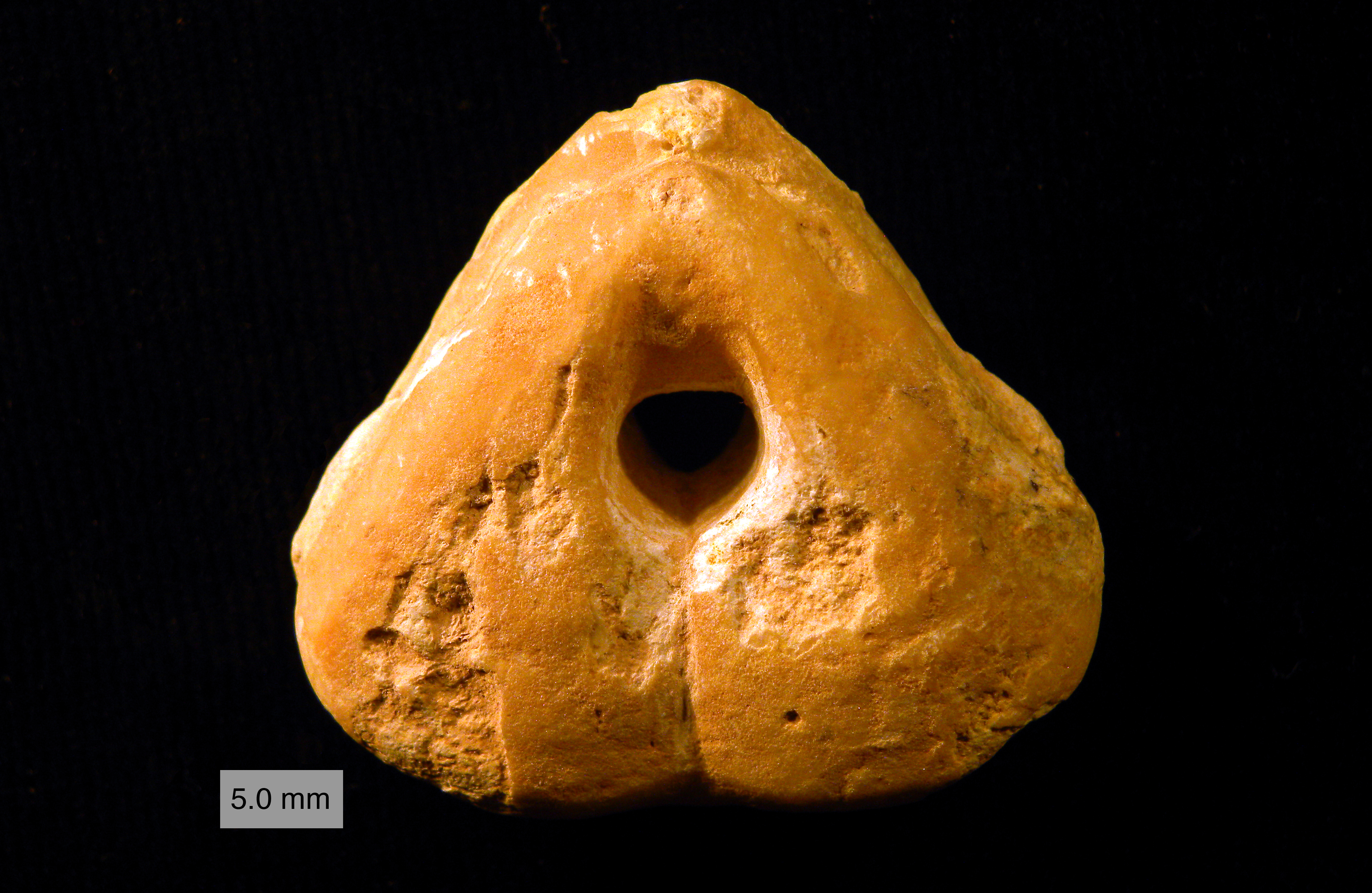
Pygites diphyoides (d'Orbigny, 1849) from the Hauterivian (Lower Cretaceous) of Cehegin, Murcia, Spain. This terebratulid is characterized by a central perforation through its valves.

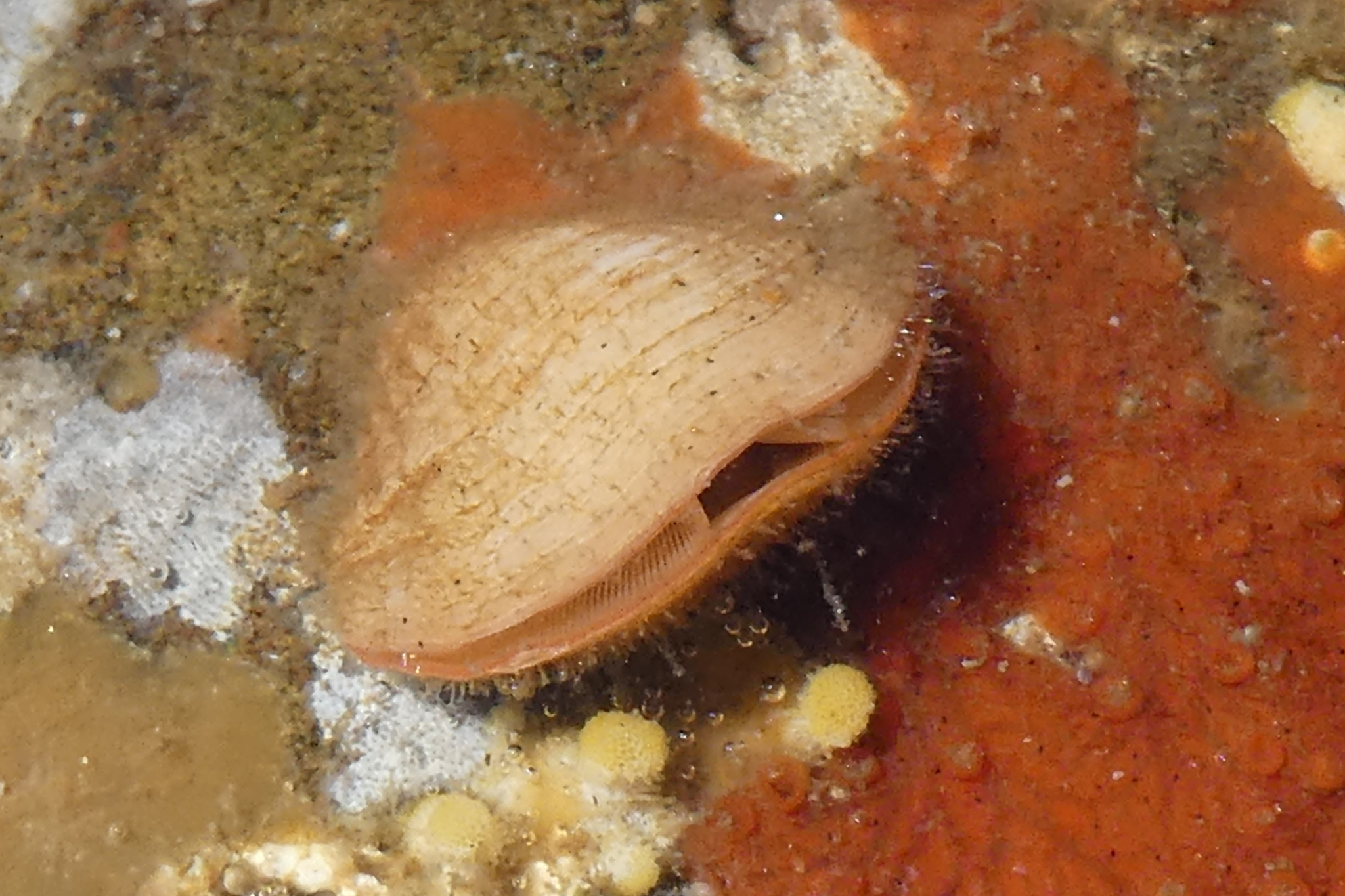
Terebratalia transversa, a living terebratulide

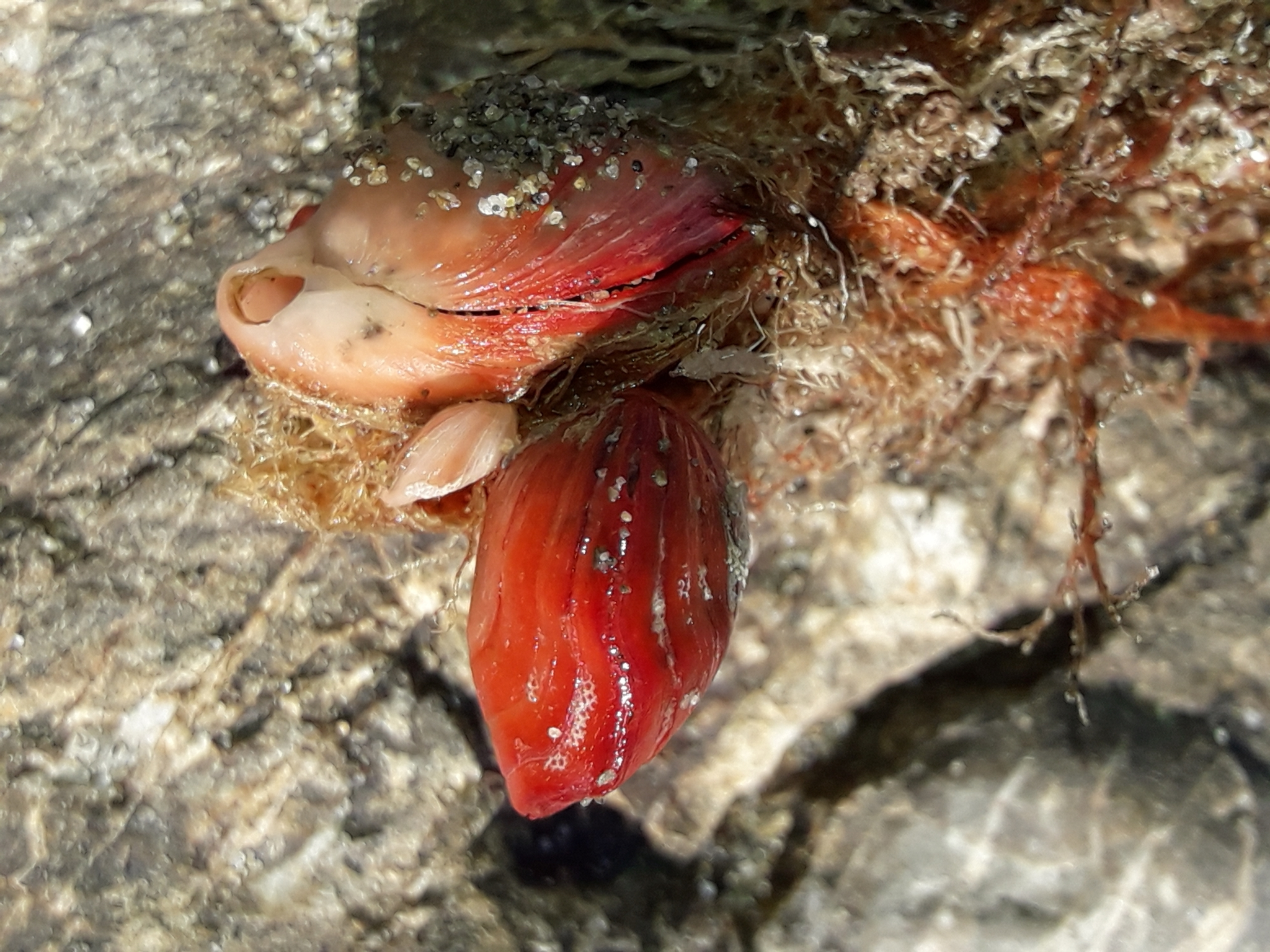
Calloria inconspicuo, a living terebratulide

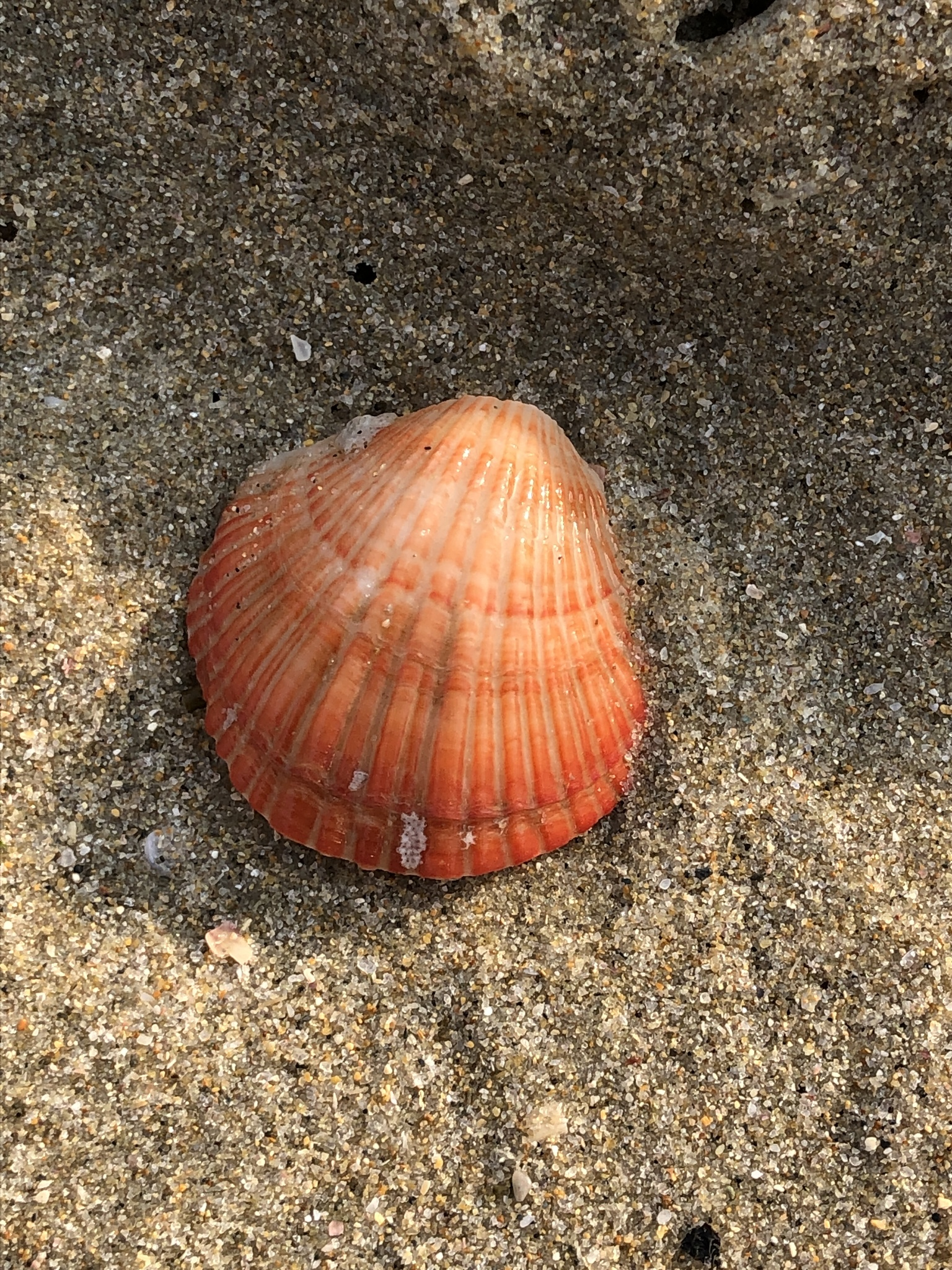
Coptothyris grayi, a living terebratulide
