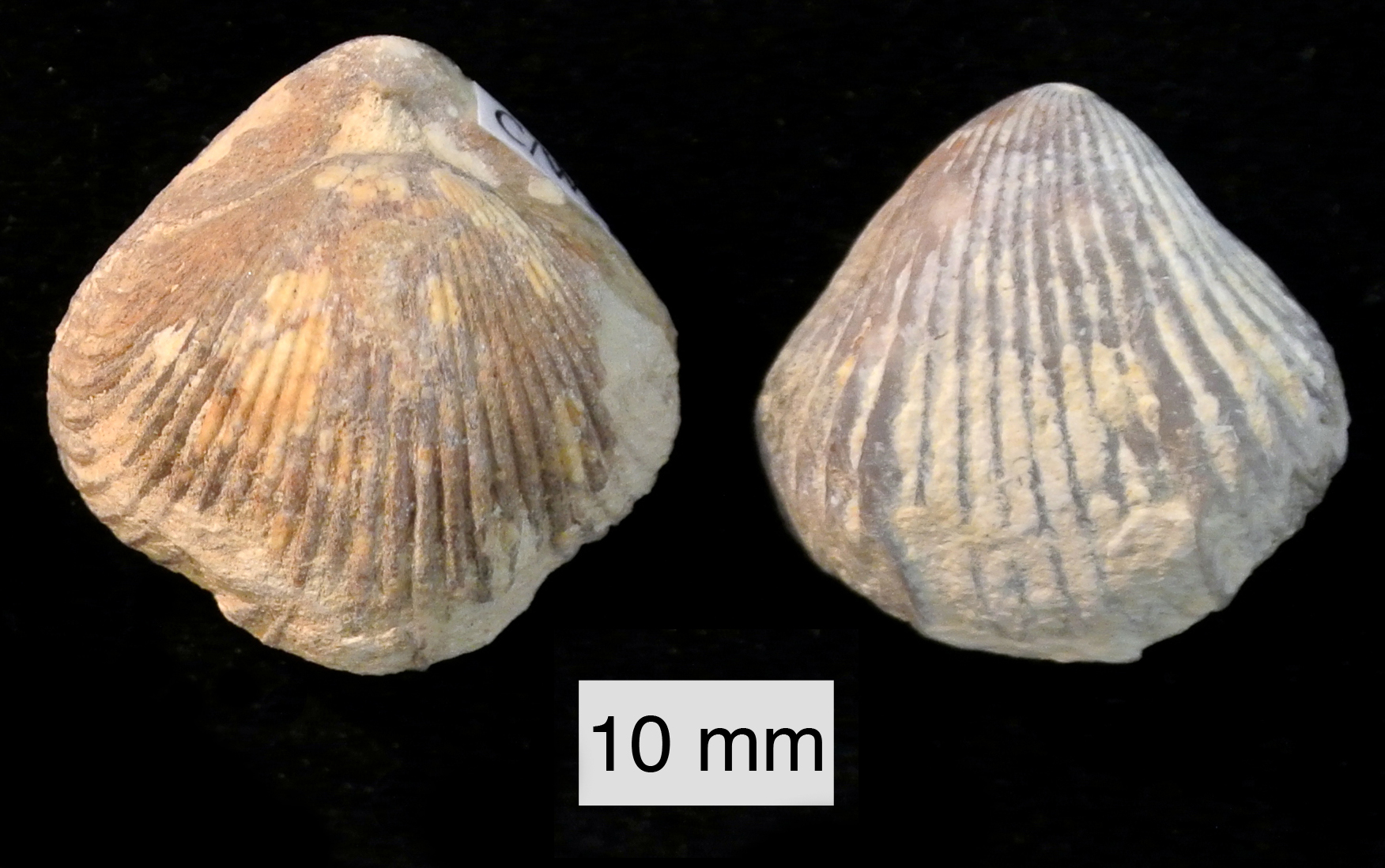
- Burmirhynchia jirbaensis (Jurassic, Israel)

Scientific classification
- Kingdom: Animalia
- Phylum: Brachiopoda
- Subphylum: Rhynchonelliformea
- Class: Rhynchonellata

Orders
- See text

= Rhynchonellata =

Rhynchonellata Temporal range: Lower Cambrian–Recent

Class of marine lamp shells

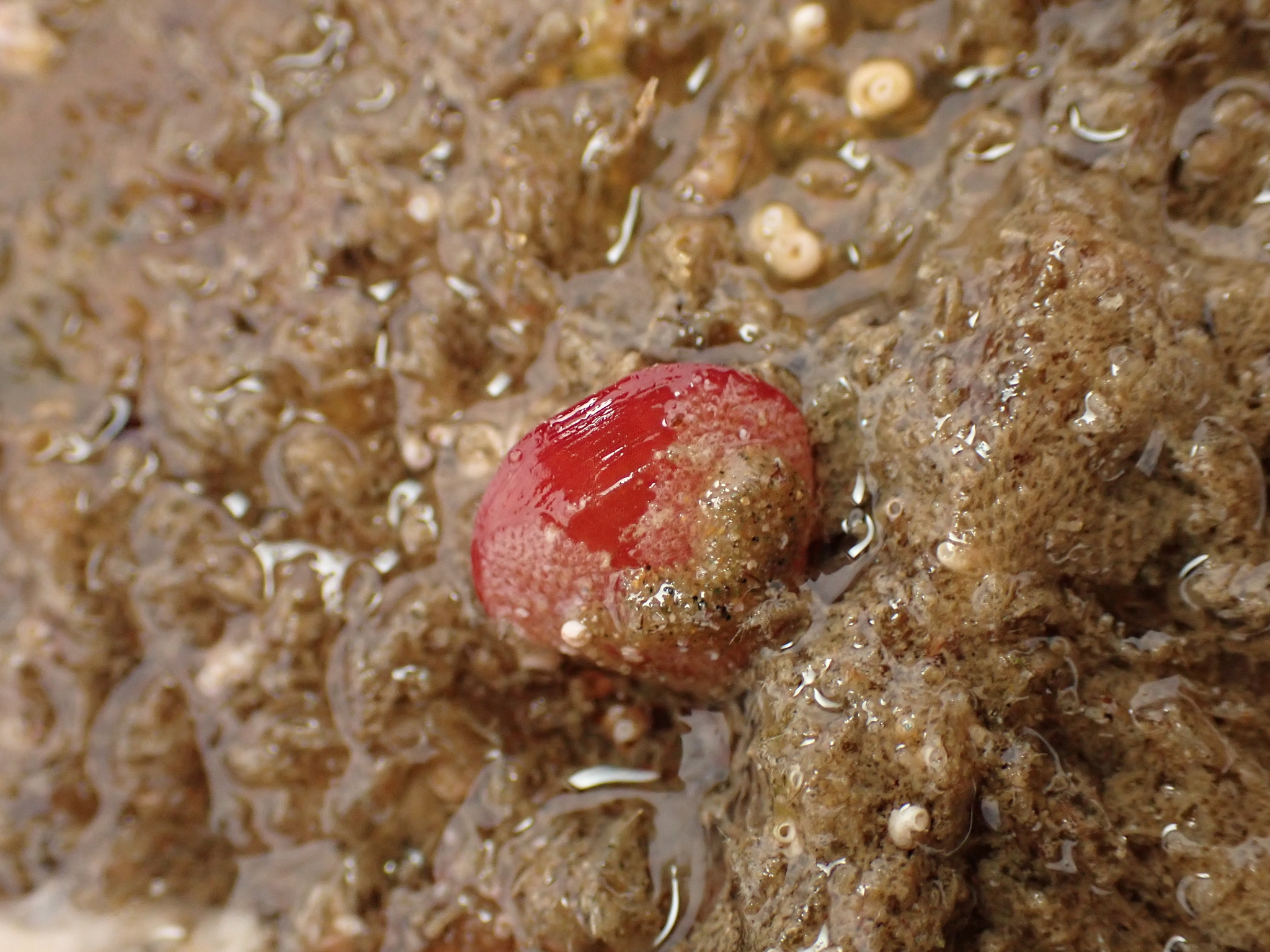
A modern member of Rhynchonellata, Calloria inconspicua, observed off the coast of New Zealand

The Rhynchonellata is a class of Lower Cambrian to Recent articulate brachiopods that combines orders from within the Rhynchonelliformea (Articulata revised) with well developed pedicle attachment. Shell forms vary from those with wide hinge lines to beaked forms with virtually no hinge line and from generally smooth to strongly plicate. Most all are biconvex. Lophophores vary and include both looped and spiraled forms. Although morphologically distinct, included orders follow a consistent phylogenetic sequence.

== Orders ==
Orders assigned to the Rhynchonellata, in temporal sequence, include:

- †Protorthida (Lower Cambrian – Upper Devonian)
- †Orthida (Lower Cambrian – Upper Permian)
- †Pentamerida (Middle Cambrian – Upper Devonian)
- †Atrypida (Lower Ordovician – Upper Devonian)
- Rhynchonellida (Lower Ordovician – Recent)
- †Spiriferida (Upper Ordovician – Lower Jurassic)
- †Athyridida (Upper Ordovician – Lower Jurassic)
- †Spiriferinida (Lower Devonian – Lower Jurassic)
- Terebratulida (Lower Devonian – Recent)
- Thecideida (Upper Triassic – Recent)

The Atrypida, Athyridida, Spiriferida, and Spiriferinida were previously considered as suborders in the Spiriferida and in the Treatise on Invertebrate Paleontology part H, all having coiled spiralia for lophophore support. In the other orders the supporting brachidia are commonly looped.

The Orthida and Spiriferida have wide hinge lines where the two valves (or shells) articulate. The Pentamerida, Terebratulida, Atrypida and Athyridida have narrow hinge lines. Some, like the Rhynchonellida and Spiriferida, may be strongly plicate, with a median fold and sulcus. Others, like the Spiriferinida and Terebratulida are basically smooth. Most have shells without perforations known as punctae and are impunctate but some e.g. Orthida and Rhynchonellida have punctate offshoots.
