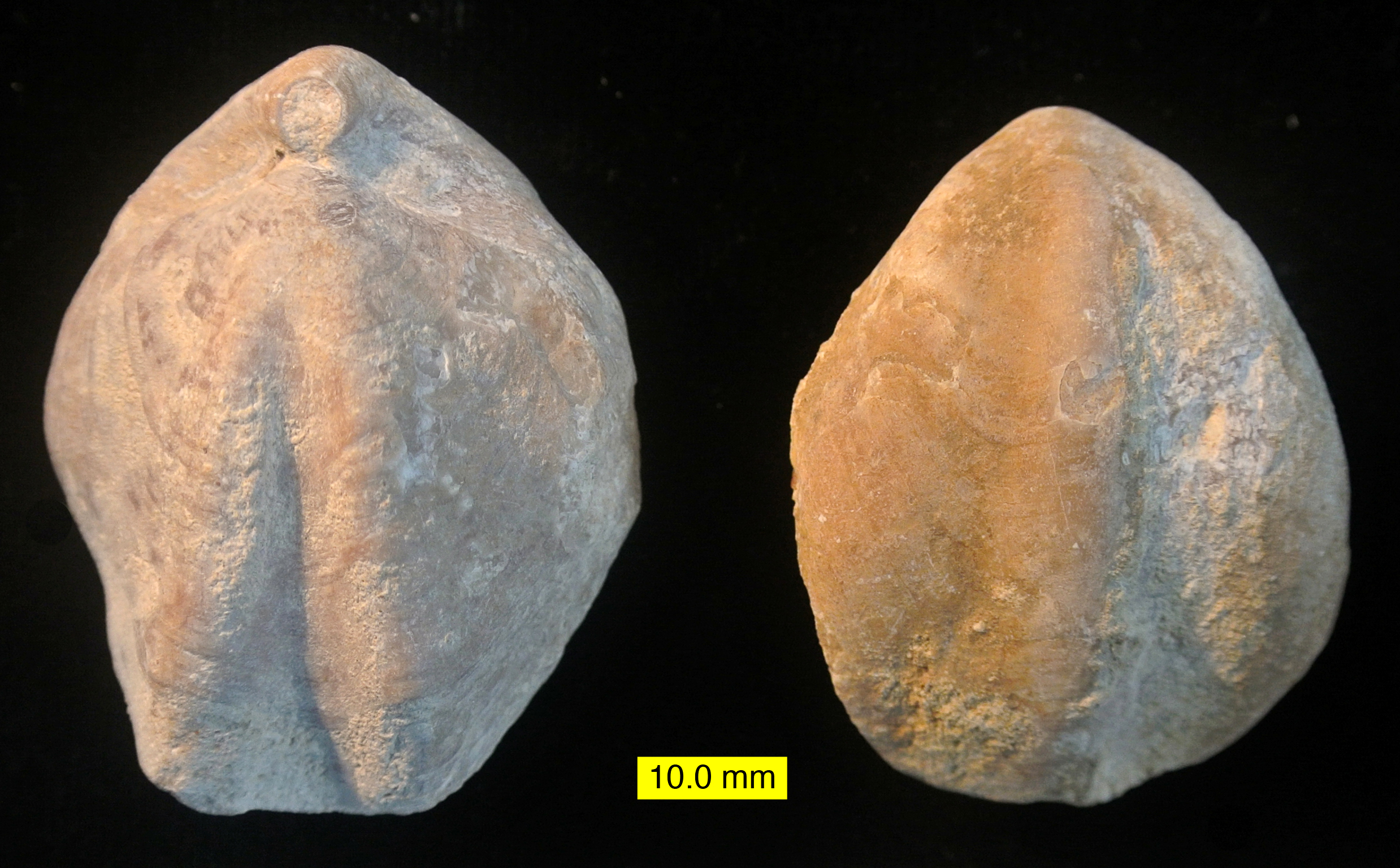
- Terebratula maugerii from the Upper Miocene of Cordoba, Spain.

Scientific classification
- Kingdom: Animalia
- Phylum: Brachiopoda
- Class: Rhynchonellata
- Order: Terebratulida
- Family: Terebratulidae
- Genus: †Terebratula; Müller, 1776

Species
- T. terebratula (Linné, 1758) (type) = Anomia terebratula

= Terebratula =

Terebratula Temporal range: Late Devonian - Recent

Genus of brachiopods

Terebratula is a modern genus of brachiopods with a fossil record dating back to the Late Devonian. These brachiopods are stationary epifaunal suspension feeders and have a worldwide distribution.

== Description ==
Terebratula species have biconvex egg-shaped shells, anterior margins of the valves have two small folds, concentric growth lines are quite thin or nearly absent. The larger valve has a ventral umbo with the opening through which they extend a short peduncle.

== Selected species ==
- Terebratula anatina
- Terebratula bieschidensis
- Terebratula bisuffarcinata
- Terebratula bussoni
- Terebratula crassa
- Terebratula decipiens
- Terebratula djeffarae
- Terebratula flemingii
- Terebratula gaudryi
- Terebratula gortanii
- Terebratula grandis
- Terebratula haidingeri
- Terebratula ichnusae
- Terebratula immanis
- Terebratula intervallata
- Terebratula jauberti
- Terebratula lamberti
- Terebratula margaritowi
- Terebratula matmatensis
- Terebratula mazetieri
- Terebratula oroseina
- Terebratula oxoniensis
- Terebratula praelustris
- Terebratula raxana
- Terebratula retusa
- Terebratula salvatoris
- Terebratula semifarcinata
- Terebratula semisella
- Terebratula stantoni
- Terebratula sturi
- Terebratula sufflata
- Terebratula terebratula
- Terebratula toucasi
- Terebratula woehrmanniana

=== Reassigned species ===
As Terebratula has been erected early on in paleontology, many species have since been reassigned to other genera.

- T. aculeata = Platidia anomioides
- T. acuminata = Pugnax acuminata
- T. acuta Quenstedt, 1869 = Musculina biennensis
- T. acuta Sowerby, 1816 = Homoeorhynchia acuta
- T. acutiplicata = Kutchithyris acutiplicata
- T. antinomia = Pygope deltoidea
- T. antisiensis = Clarckeia antisiensis
- T. archiaci = Meganteris archiaci
- T. ascendens = Septalaria ascendens
- T. aualites = Loboidothyris aualites
- T. australis = Magellania australis
- T. bentleyi = Tegulithyris bentleyi
- T. bifida = Linguithyris bifida
- T. bivallata = Antiptychina bivallata
- T. brachyptycta = Isopoma brachyptycta
- T. bullata = Rugitela bullata
- T. californiana = Laqueus californianus
- T. capsula = Gwynia capsula
- T. cardita = Megathiris detruncata
- T. chilensis = Terebratella dorsata
- T. cimex = Cimicinella cimex
- T. concentrica = Athyris concentrica
- T. cordata = Joania cordata
- T. cornuta = Zeilleria cornuta
- T. costata = Rhynchora costata
- T. cranium = Macandrevia cranium
- T. crispa = Howellella crispa
- T. cuneata Dalman, 1828 = Rhynchotreta cuneata
- T. cuneata Risso, 1826 = Argyrotheca cuneata
- T. curvifrons = Pseudoglossothyris leckhamptonensis
- T. cymbaeformis = Gilledia cymbaeformis
- T. daleidensis = Oligoptycherhynchus daleidensis
- T. debuchii = Streptaria debuchii
- T. deltoidea = Pygope deltoidea
- T. depressa = Rectithyris depressa
- T. depressa var. cyrta = Cyrtothyris cyrta
- T. dilatata = Antinomia dilatata
- T. diphimorpha = Moraviaturia diphimorpha
- T. diphya = Pygope diphya
- T. diphyoides = Pygites diphyoides
- T. duboisi = Zygospiraella duboisi
- T. dutempleana = Moutonithyris dutempliana
- T. emarginata = Terebratulina retusa
- T. eucharis = Eucharitina eucharis
- T. eugenii = Epicyrta eugenii
- T. euides = Euidothyris extensa
- T. extensa = Rhombothyris extensa
- T. fabulites = Camarospira eucharis
- T. fimbri = Plectothyris fimbri
- T. fittoni = Neoliothyrina fittoni
- T. flabellum = Flabellothyris flabellum
- T. flavescens = Magellania australis
- T. flexuosa = Anomactinella flexuosa
- T. fornicata = Ladogofornix fornicate
- T. geinitziana = Rhynchopora geinitziana
- T. gisii = Gisilina gisii
- T. globata var. tumida = Stiphrothyris tumida
- T. gravida = Goniothyris dorsetensis
- T. grayi Davidson, 1848 = Streptis grayi
- T. grayi Davidson, 1852 = Coptothyris grayi
- T. gregaria = Rhaetina gregaria
- T. gregariaeformis = Triadithyris gregariaeformis
- T. gualteri = Aetheia gualteri
- T. guerangeri = Fimbiothyris guerangeri
- T. hagar = Propygope hagar
- T. harlani = Oleneothyris harlani
- T. hebe = Hebethoechia hebe
- T. hemisphaeroidica = Amphitornella hemisphaeroidica
- T. henrici = Glossinulus henrici
- T. herculea = Meristina herculean
- T. heyseana = Orthotoma spinati
- T. Iineata = Martinothyris Iineata
- T. imbricata = Plectatrypa imbricata
- T. inconspicua = Waltonia valenciennesi
- T. indistincta = Dioristella indistincta
- T. intermedia = Cererithyris intermedia
- T. kielcensis = Dzieduszyckia kielcensis
- T. laeviuscula = Glassina laeviuscula
- T. lata = Cyclothyris latissima
- T. latilinguis = Gruenewaldtia latilinguis
- T. latissima = Cyclothyris latissima
- T. latona = Latonotoechia latona
- T. lenticularis = Neothyris lenticularis
- T. lepida = Bifida lepida
- T. lima = Kingena lima
- T. lineata = Eospirifer radiatus
- T. marginalis = Spirigerina marginalis
- T. mayeri = Heimia mayeri
- T. michalkowii = Rouillieria michalkowii
- T. microrhyncha = Pseudocarnarophoria microrhyncha
- T. monas = Monadotoechia monas
- T. monstruosa = Pantellaria monstruosa
- T. morierei = Cheniothyris morierei
- T. moutoniana = Platythyris comptonensis
- T. mucronata = Triathyris mucronata
- T. multicarinata = Peregrinella peregrina
- T. multiformis = Lamellaerhynchia rostriformis
- T. navicula = Dayia navicula
- T. nerviensis = Rectithyris depressa
- T. nigricans = Notosaria nigricans
- T. obesa Davidson, 1852 = Neoliothyrina obesa
- T. obesa Sowerby, 1823 = Concinnithyris obesa
- T. orbignyana = Nucinulus orbignyana
- T. orbis = Zittelina orbis
- T. ornithocephala = Ornithella ornithocephala
- T. ovoides = Rensselaeria elongata
- T. oxoptychia = Mosquella oxoptychia
- T. pachyderma = Camerophorina pachyderma
- T. pectita = Derita pectita
- T. peregrina = Peregrinella peregrina
- T. philomela = Cryptatrypa Philomela
- T. phoenix = Phoenicitoechia phoenix
- T. pisolithica = Stroudithyris pisolithica
- T. plicata = Choristothyris plicata
- T. plicatella = Sphenorhynchia plicatella
- T. plicatilis = Cretirhynchia plicatilis
- T. polyplecta = Plectoidothyris polyplecta
- T. praegnans = Praegnantenia praegnans
- T. praelonga = Praelongithyris praelonga
- T. prisca flabellata = Minatrypa flabellate
- T. quadrata = Terebratulina retusa
- T. quinquecostata = Pentactinella quinquecostata
- T. ramsaueri = Camerothyris ramsaueri
- T. rectirostra = Cryptonella rectirostra
- T. renierii var. sinuosa = Hesperithyris sinuosa
- T. resupinata = Aulacothyris resupinata
- T. rhaetica = Zugmayeria rhaetica
- T. romingeri = Cranaena romingeri
- T. rostriformis = Lamellaerhynchia rostriformis
- T. sakhalinensis = Cnismatocentrum sakhalinensis
- T. sanguina = Magasella evansii
- T. scalpellum = Scalpellirhynchia scalpellum
- T. scalprum = Dicamara plebeia
- T. schlotheimi = Stenoscisma schlotheimi
- T. schnuri = Schnurella schnuri
- T. sella = Sellithyris sella
- T. semiglobularis = Meonia semiglobularis
- T. septigera = Dallina septigera
- T. soldaniana = Argyrotheca cuneata
- T. stephani = Ptyctothyris stephani
- T. strigiceps = Rhenorensselaeria strigiceps
- T. strogonofi = Uralella strogonofi
- T. subvesicularis = Notothyris subvesicularis
- T. sulcifera = Ornatothyris sulcifera
- T. tarda = Lanceomyonia tarda
- T. tetraëdra = Tetrarhynchia tetrahedra
- T. tetrahedra = Tetrarhynchia tetrahedra
- T. tetratoma = Tetratomia tetratoma
- T. thetis = Dubaria thetis
- T. torenoi = Pradoia torenoi
- T. transversa = Terebratalia transversa
- T. triplicata squarniplex = Squamirhynchia squarniplex
- T. truncata Sowerby, 1826 = Gemmarcula aurea
- T. truncata Linné, 1767 = Megerlia truncata
- T. uptoni = Charltonithyris uptoni
- T. urna antiqua = Megathiris detruncata
- T. uva = Liothyrella uva
- T. velox = Amissopecten velox
- T. venusta = Anoplotheca venusta
- T. verneuili = Pleisiothyris verneuili
- T. virtrea = Gryphus vitreus
- T. wissmanni = Diplospirella wissmanni
- T. wrighti = Tubithyris wrighti
- T. wyvillei = Abyssothyris wyvillei

== Gallery ==
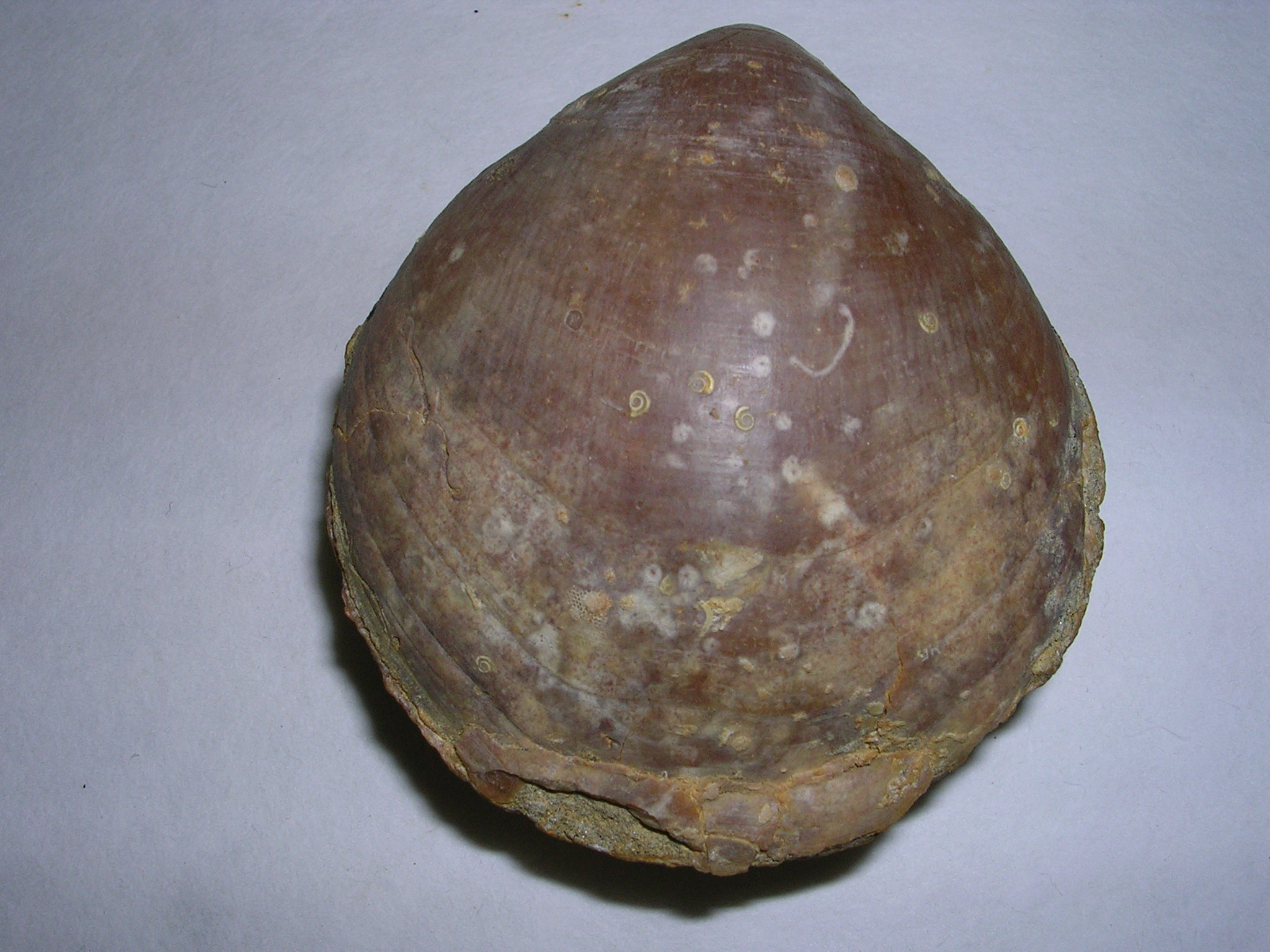
Terebrantula ampulla fossil from Pliocene founded in Almería

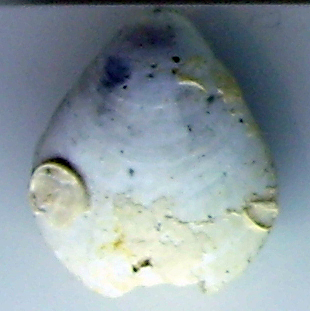
Terebratula longirostris fossil at the Geological Museum, Copenhagen

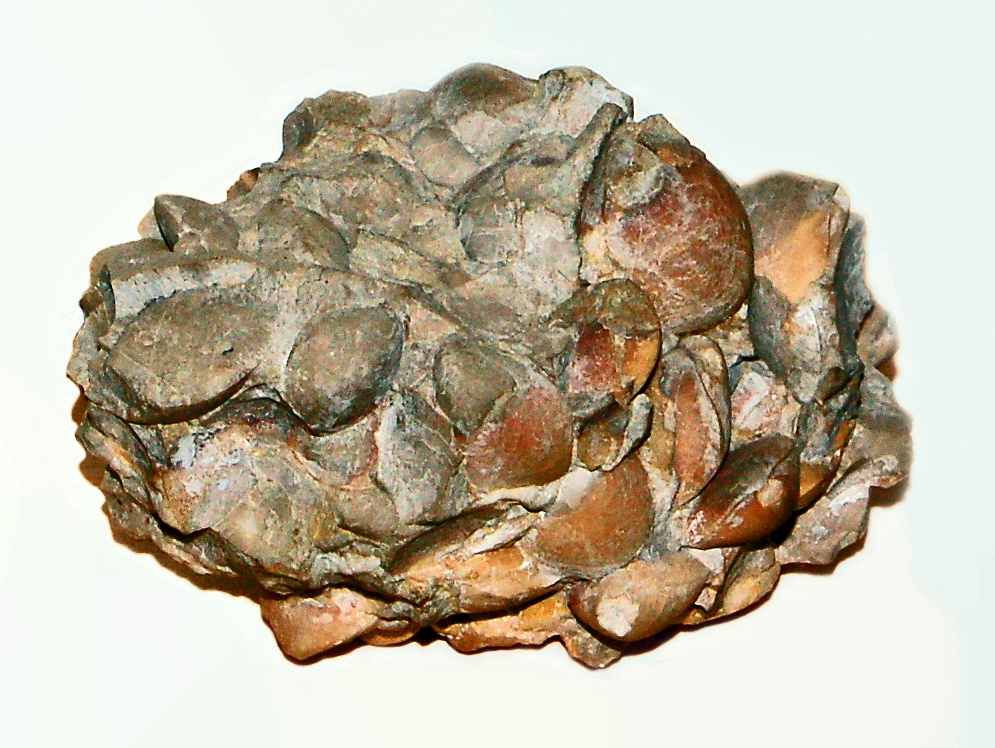
Terebratula sp. from the Triassic of Bolzano, Italy
