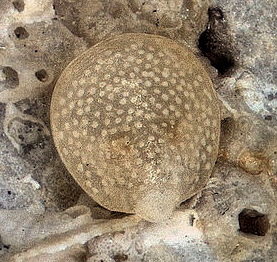
- Gwynia capsula, 1mm

Scientific classification
- Kingdom: Animalia
- Phylum: Brachiopoda
- Class: Rhynchonellata
- Order: Terebratulida
- Family: Megathyrididae
- Genus: Gwynia
- Species: G. capsula

Binomial name
- Gwynia capsula Jeffreys, 1859

Synonyms
- Terebratula capsula

= Gwynia capsula =

Gwynia capsula Temporal range: Pleistocene–Recent

Species of marine lamp shell

Gwynia capsula is a very small to minute brachiopod (maximally 1.5 millimetres or 0.059 inches long), currently known from the east Atlantic (France, Belgium, British Isles), but which occurred during the Pleistocene in what is now Norway. It has a translucent, whitish, purse-shaped shell with relatively large, wide-spaced pits (or punctae). It lives attached to stones or shells (fragments) in between large grains of sand. Like in all brachiopods, it filters food particles, chiefly diatoms and dinoflagellates. Gwynia capsula harbors a small number of larvae inside a brood pouch, but it has separate sexes, unlike also very small and pouch brooding brachiopods Argyrotheca and Joania, which are hermaphrodites.
