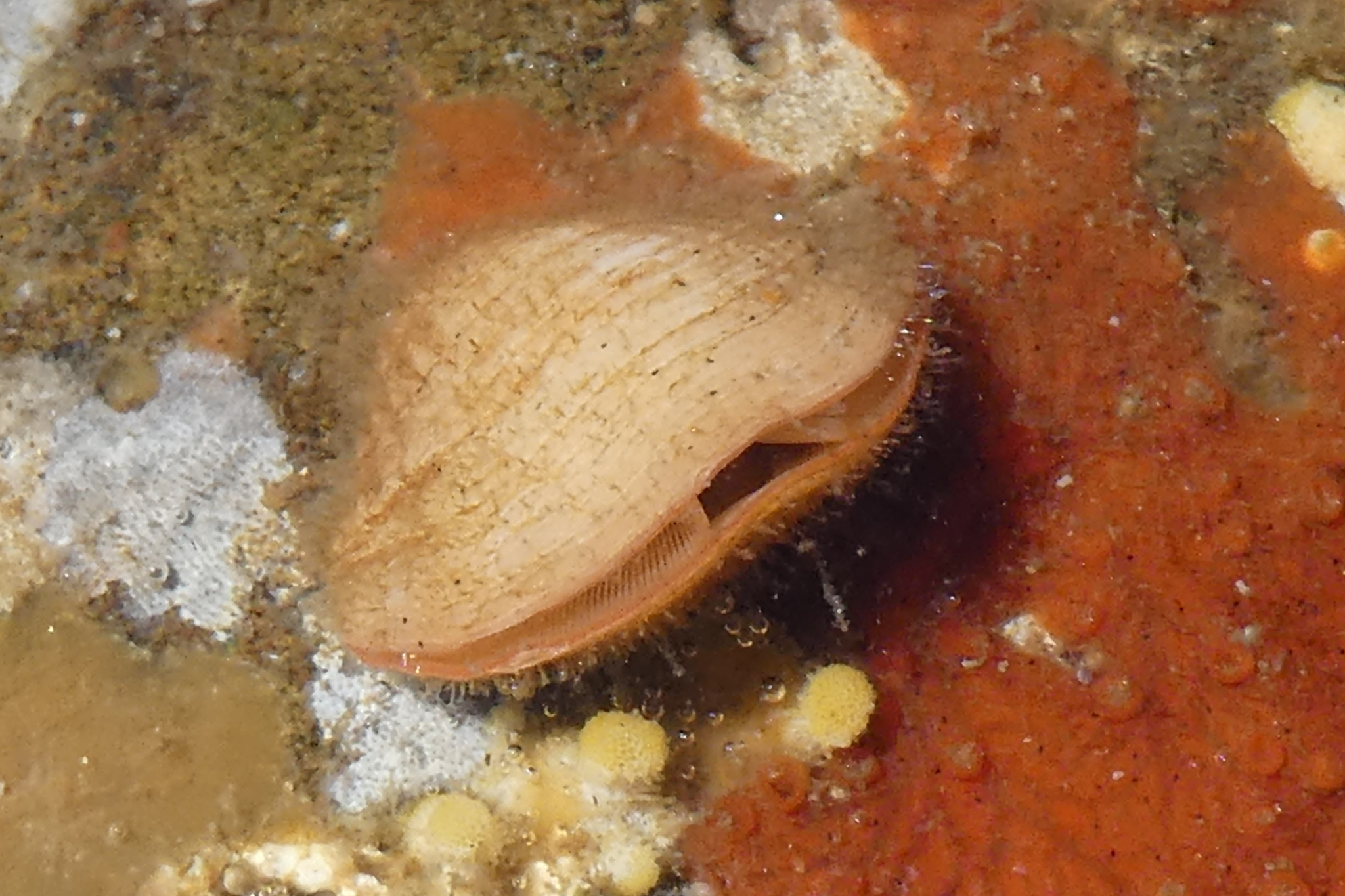

Scientific classification
- Kingdom: Animalia
- Phylum: Brachiopoda
- Class: Rhynchonellata
- Order: Terebratulida
- Family: Terebrataliidae
- Genus: Terebratalia
- Species: T. transversa

Binomial name
- Terebratalia transversa (Sowerby, 1846)

= Terebratalia transversa =

Species of brachiopod

Terebratalia transversa or the North Pacific Lampshell is a species of marine brachiopod in the family Terebrataliidae. A two-valved shelled species, they are most frequently found in tidal habitats in the Pacific Northwest of the United States.

Terebratalia transversa radial symmetry development (Translation to English: оболочка оплодотворения = fertilization membrane, зигота = zygote, 100 мкм = 100 µm, бластула = blastula)

== Life history ==
=== Larval stage ===
Despite being part of the Spiralia clade, the embryos develop through radial cleavage. Researchers find that the mesoderm found in Terebertalia larvae comes from the endomesoderm and develops close to the vegetal blastopore.

Its larval features include the apical organ, apical ciliary tuft, and bands of ciliated sections. The features of the apical organ suggest an evolutionary reconstruction of brains commonly seen in bilaterians. During the development of this apical organ, the ciliated sections form together into a tuft with recessed rootlets that is made up of acetylated α-tubulin.

The larvae are lecithotrophic and typically spend four days as juveniles until they undergo metamorphosis. In past studies, it appeared that the ideal temperature for T. transversa development is 11 °C. The first muscles to develop in the species are the pedicle and mantle muscles. Shortly after, they develop four setae pouches which later connect to their developing circular mantle. They are free-swimming and during larval stages, carry two cell types in their epithelium: lobate and vesicular cells. The lobate cells develop a thin layer of undescribed material while the vesicular cells create a sheet dense in electrons, that will eventually become the foundation of their developing periostracum.

In late-stage larvae, the species has their pedicle muscles connected to their central mantle which then is connected to the setae pouches along with an apical musculature. At this point, the species is referred to as a three-lobed larva. Late stage T. transversa larvae also develop pigmented ocelli that develop on the dorsal side of their apical lobe.

Prior to the brain neuropile that develops in the adult stage of the species, the late larval stages of T. transvesa contain a nervous system which consists of three neural domains, one that is located ventrally to the mantle lobe of the larvae and two that are located anteriorly.

Juveniles develop quickly after their A-P axis emerges due to Hox gene expression in the event referred to as "metamorphosis." Two days after this metamorphosis, T. transversa display adult morphology. The point at which they are referred to as adults is when they have a clearly separated body from their old two-valved juvenile shell attached via a posterior pedicle.

=== Adult stage ===
Terebratalia transversa adults can grow up to an average of 50 millimeters long. They have a distinctive, thin two-layer calcitic shell. Like most invertebrates, this species cannot survive in water temperatures higher than 35 °C. During adulthood they are filter feeding animals rather than their non-feeding lifestyle as larvae.

They contain a lophophore, a ciliated feeding organ that has a similar appearance to an external tentacle. They also have two-valved shells connected by a singular tooth through a socket hinge.

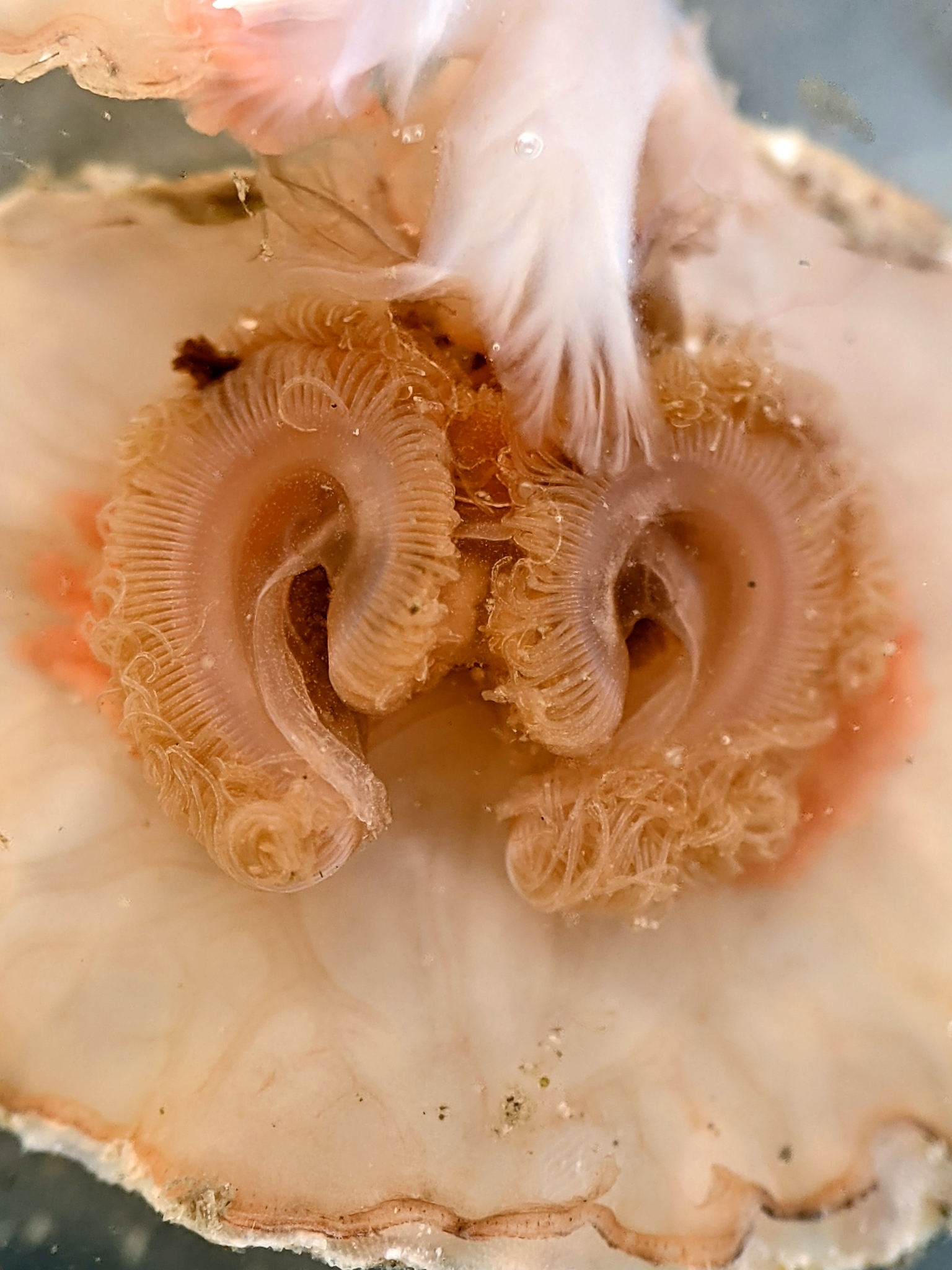
Inside of a North Pacific Lampshell showing the lophophore.

T. transversa has a nervous system that consists of a brain neuropile found dorsally to a slit found on the surface of their bodies. The musculature consists of rudiments of pedicle adjustors, shell diductors, and shell adductors. It is noted that in recently metamorphic juveniles, musculature can remodel variably. The most significant muscle morphology in the species is referred to as the mantle margin, the tissues responsible for the development of their adult shell.

T. transversa has musculature that composes their intestine and has tentacles of which contain multiple striated muscle fibers. They contain no anus nor an articulated valve hinge.

The calcitic shell is an identifying aspect of the species, however, their shells vary extremely in appearance between individuals within a population. In developing their shells, the species develops additions of carbonate to their exterior and later, during adulthood, their shells begin secreting epithelium. Their shells are divided into two classifications, the primary layer and the secondary layer. The outermost part of the shell is the primary layer which contains transversal sections of fibers pointing in various directions. The secondary shell layer is typically thicker and contain similar transversal fibers. In the both layers, there are punctuations dotting the shell appearing as slits in the shell tissue. During shell development, these fibers, which are also composed of calcite, can rotate against their orientation gradient which strengthens the overall shell structure. The composition and overall shape of shells are heavily dependent on seawater molecular composition and tidal habitats.

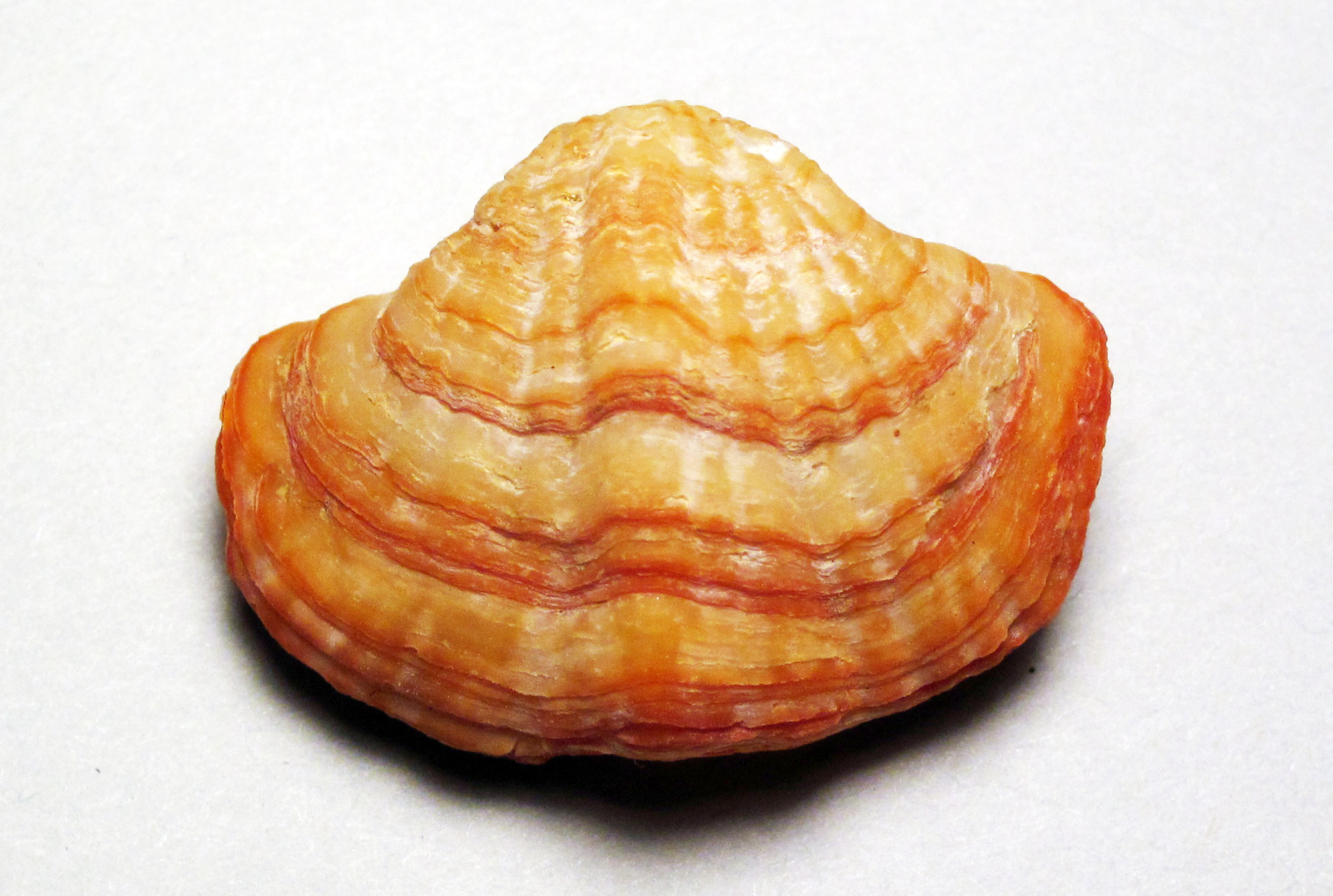
Calcite shell showing distinct growing periods separated by striations

=== Varying morphology ===
Presenting accurate morphological details of Terebratalia transversa has proven to be difficult as studies have shown that the species is highly variable in their morphology. The overall body form of the species can vary immensely with some appearing as prolate spheroids and others as oblate spheroids. Another difficulty when examining traits of the species is the variance between shell features of the species, specifically the smooth and ribbed shells found within this species. It has been proposed that meristic traits are not applicable in the homoegenous classification of T. transversa.

== Habitat and distribution ==
Significant populations of Terebratalia transversa are located in the waters near the Pacific Northwest in the United States. Specifically, scientists have collected the species by dredging in the area around the San Juan Channel off the coast of Washington, USA. The species resides in tidal and sub-tidal habitats. The molecular composition of these habitats affect heavily the size of shells as the carbon-oxygen isotope ratios in the seawater surrounding them will affect their shell growth rates.

== Fossil and genetic analysis ==
Due to the very thin calcitic shell of Terebratalia, the primary layer of these shells very rarely fossilize. The shells of this species, when fossilized, help researchers find preserved isotopic signals that aid in uncovering molecular compositions of an old Paleozoic ocean.

Somewhat recently, researchers at the University of Michigan completed the mitochondrial genome of Terebratalia transversa. They uncovered that the mtDNA encodes for two rRNAs, thirteen proteins, and twenty-two tRNAs. The genetic information used to synthesize these compounds is comprised in 37 genes in the mitochondria. Something uncommon among other described mtDNAs in animals, is that the genes of T. transversa are transcribed from the same strand. Most of the known morphology of T. transversa comes from research based on confocal laser scanning microscopy (CLSM) in conjunction with both scanning and transmission electron microscopy.
