= Terebrirostra =

Terebrirostra Temporal range: Cretaceous

Scientific classification
- Kingdom: Animalia
- Phylum: Brachiopoda
- Class: Rhynchonellata
- Order: Terebratulida
- Family: Terebrataliidae
- Genus: †Terebrirostra d'Orbigny, 1847

Extinct genus of brachiopods

Terebrirostra is an extinct genus of brachiopods from the Cretaceous of Europe.
