= Diestothyris =

Scientific classification
- Domain: Eukaryota
- Kingdom: Animalia
- Phylum: Brachiopoda
- Class: Rhynchonellata
- Order: Terebratulida
- Family: Terebrataliidae
- Genus: Diestothyris; Thomson, 1916

Genus of brachiopods

Diestothyris is a genus of brachiopods belonging to the family Terebrataliidae.

The species of this genus are found in Northern Pacific Ocean.

Species:

- Diestothyris frontalis (Middendorff, 1849)
- Diestothyris tisimania (Nomura & Hatai, 1936)
