= Dyscoliidae =

Scientific classification
- Domain: Eukaryota
- Kingdom: Animalia
- Phylum: Brachiopoda
- Class: Rhynchonellata
- Order: Terebratulida
- Family: Dyscoliidae

Family of brachiopods

Dyscoliidae is a family of brachiopods belonging to the order Terebratulida.

== Genera ==
Genera:

- Abyssothyris Thomson, 1927
- †Acrobelesia Cooper, 1983
- Ceramisia Cooper, 1983
- Discolia Fischer & Oehlert, 1891
- Dyscolia Fischer & Oehlert, 1890
- Eurysoria Cooper, 1983
- Faksethyris Asgaard, 1971
- Goniobrochus Cooper, 1983
- Moraviaturia Sahni, 1960
- Oceanithyris Bitner & Zezina, 2013
- Walsiuthyrina Beets, 1943
- Xenobrochus Cooper, 1981
