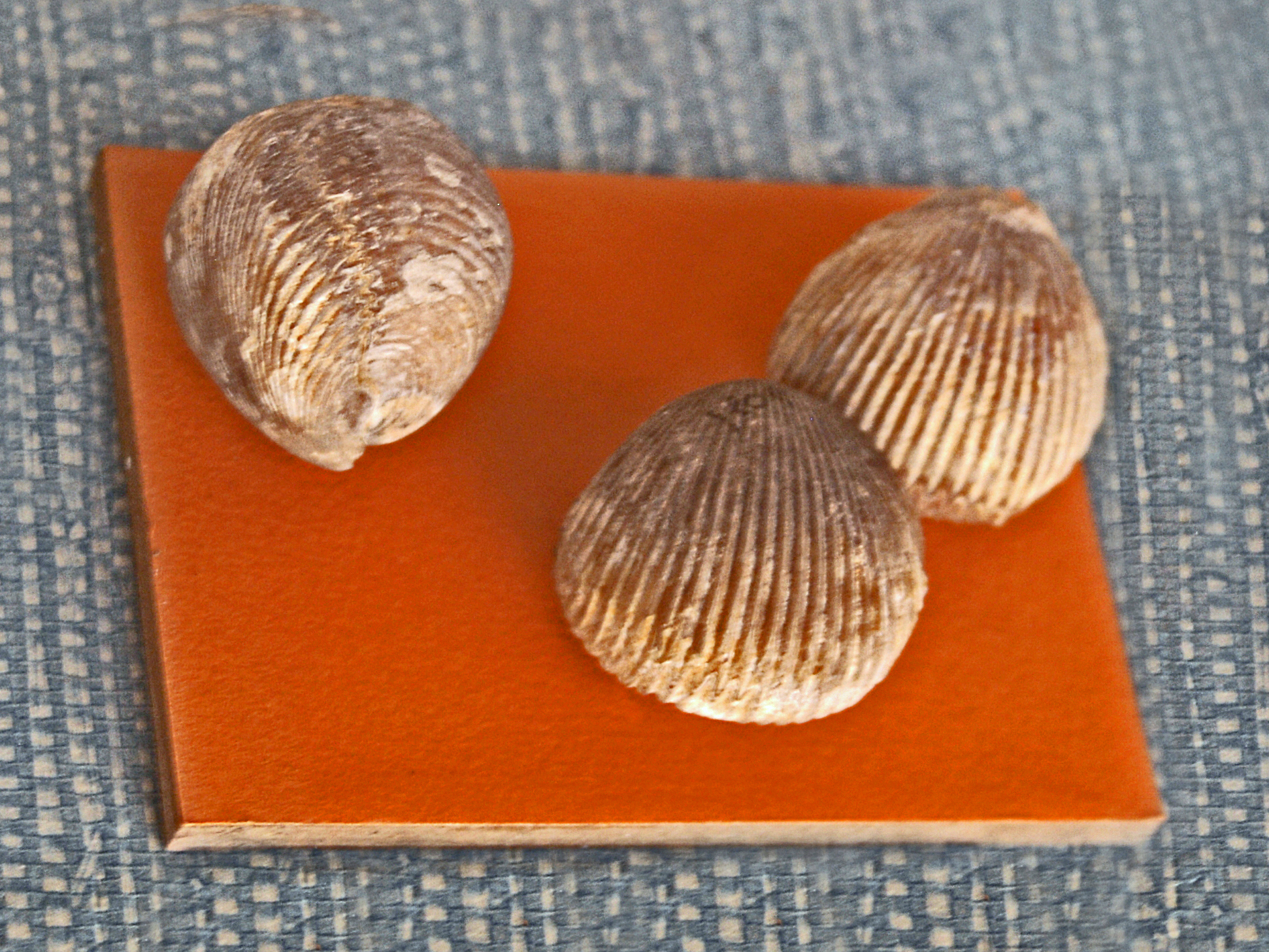
- Fossil of Sphenorhynchia plicatella from France, on display at Galerie de paléontologie et d'anatomie comparée in Paris

Scientific classification
- Kingdom: Animalia
- Phylum: Brachiopoda
- Class: Rhynchonellata
- Order: Rhynchonellida
- Family: †Prionorhynchiidae
- Genus: †Sphenorhynchia
- Species: †S. plicatella

Binomial name
- †Sphenorhynchia plicatella (Sowerby, 1825)

= Sphenorhynchia plicatella =

Sphenorhynchia plicatella Temporal range: Jurassic

Extinct species of marine lamp shell

Sphenorhynchia plicatella is an extinct species of brachiopods belonging to the family Prionorhynchiidae.

These brachiopods are stationary epifaunal suspension feeders. They lived in the Jurassic period, from 167.7 to 161.2 Ma.
