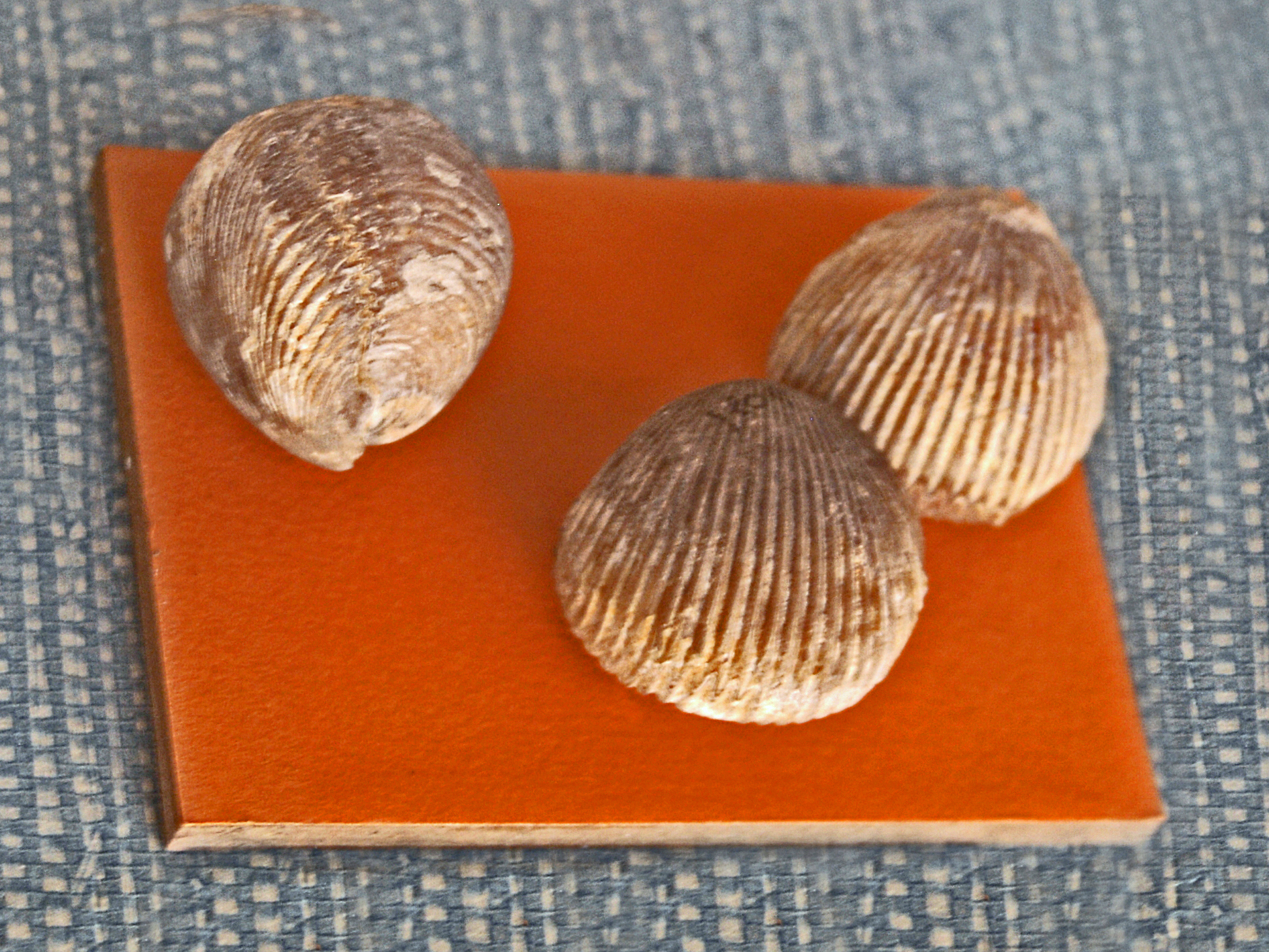
- Fossil of Sphenorhynchia plicatella from France, on display at Galerie de paléontologie et d'anatomie comparée in Paris

Scientific classification
- Kingdom: Animalia
- Phylum: Brachiopoda
- Class: Rhynchonellata
- Order: Rhynchonellida
- Superfamily: †Rhynchotetradoidea
- Family: †Prionorhynchiidae; Williams et al., 2002

= Prionorhynchiidae =

Prionorhynchiidae Temporal range: Triassic–Jurassic

Extinct family of marine lamp shells

Prionorhynchiidae is an extinct family of brachiopods belonging to the order Rhynchonellida.

These brachiopods are stationary epifaunal suspension feeders. They lived in the Triassic and in the Jurassic periods, from 235.0 to 164.7 Ma.

== Genera ==
- Amoenirhynchia
- Lokutella
- Prionorhynchia
- Sphenorhynchia
