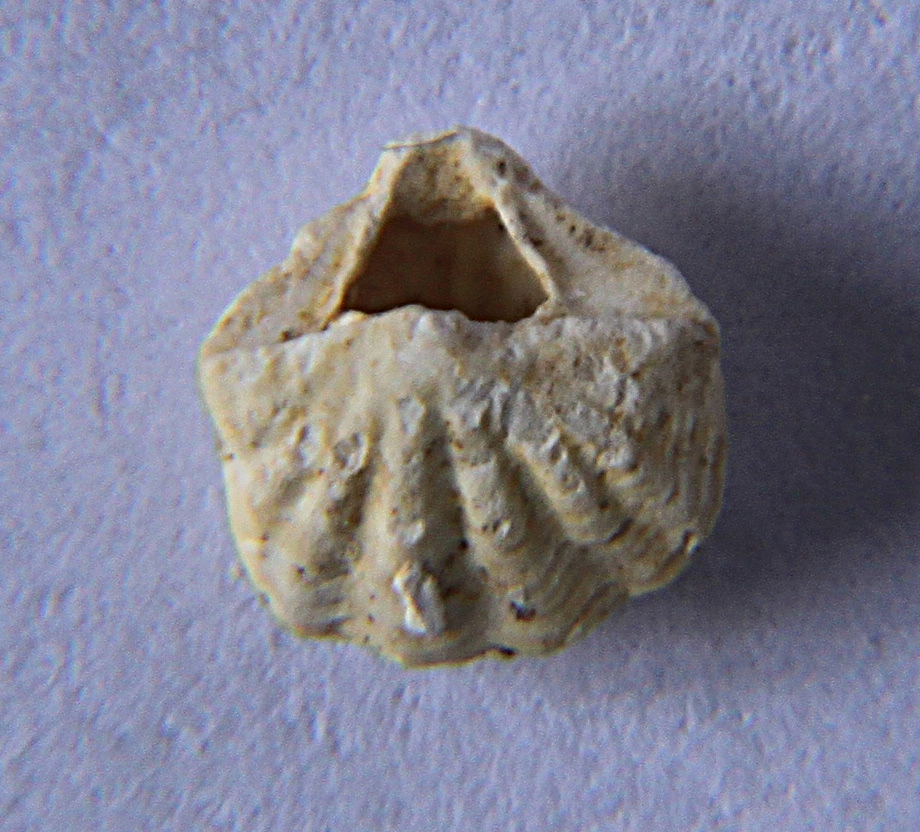
- Argyrotheca cuneata, 4mm, Miocene

Scientific classification
- Kingdom: Animalia
- Phylum: Brachiopoda
- Class: Rhynchonellata
- Order: Terebratulida
- Family: Megathyrididae
- Genus: Argyrotheca; Dall, 1900

Species
- A. cuneata (Risso, 1826) (type) = Terebratula cuneata, T. soldaniana; A. angulata Zezina, 1987; A. australis (Blochmann, 1910); A. barrettiana (Davidson, 1866); A. bermudana Dall, 1911; A. cistellula (Searles-Wood, 1841) = Argiope cistellula; A. cooperi Logan & Bitner, 2013; A. crassa Cooper, 1977; A. faujasi (Bosquet, 1859) = Argiope faujasi Maastrichtian; A. furtive Simon, 2010; A. grandicostata Logan, 1983; A. hewatti Cooper, 1977; A. jacksoni Cooper, 1973; A. johnsoni Cooper, 1934; A. lowei Hertlein & Grant, 1944; A. lutea (Dall, 1871); A. mayi Blochmann, 1914; A. megatremoides (Bosquet, 1859) = Argiope megatremoides Maastrichtian; A. neocaledonensis Bitner, 2010; A. rubrocostata Cooper, 1977; A. rubrotincta (Dall, 1871); A. schrammi (Crosse & Fischer, 1866); A. somaliensis Cooper, 1973; A. thurmanni Cooper, 1973; A. woodwardiana (Davidson, 1866)

Synonyms
- Cistella Gray, 1853 non Gistl, 1848, a beetle

= Argyrotheca =

Argyrotheca Temporal range: Maastrichtian–Recent

Genus of brachiopods

Argyrotheca is a genus of very small to minute lampshells (maximum 5 millimetres or 0.20 inches long). All species share a large pedicel opening (or foramen), one ridge on the inside of the pedunculate valve, pits in a diamond pattern on the inside of both valves, and without radial ridges that end in tubercles. It occurs in depths between 6 and 1300 m. It is known since the latest Cretaceous.

== Description ==
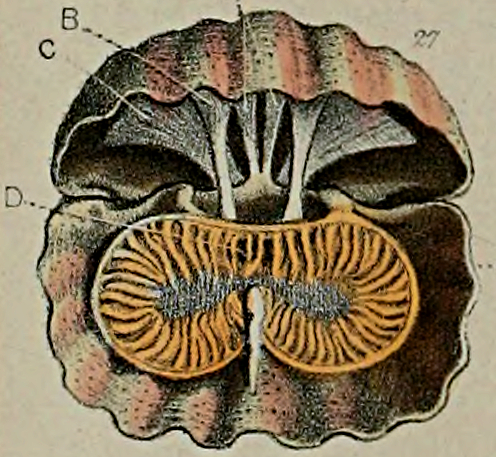
Argyrotheca cuneata, interior of the shell: A = cardinal muscle, B = adductor muscle, C = pedicle muscle, D = mouth (bottom)

Some Argyrotheca species have red stripes radiating from the pedicle opening (or foramen). These species are among a few living brachiopods with color marking on the shell. All other colored brachiopods are from shallow water too. This kind of color patterns may be a form of camouflage. Argyrotheca is fastened by a very short and thick stalk. The shell is biconvex with two high and wide ribs radiating close to the midline (a shell-shape called strangulate) and four radiating ribs of declining height and width further lateral (a shell-shape called oppositely multiplicate), smooth or more commonly multiplicate. The inner surface of the shell has many rather coarse pits (or punctae). The larger valve (pedicle valve or ventral valve) has a fairly short stump beak (or subtruncate). The pedicle opening (or foramen) is large (about a third of the maximum with of the shell), almost entirely situated in the backfolding part (or delthyrium) of the pedicle valve (submesothyridid to almost hypothyridid), leaving ample space for the small deltidial plates. The pedicle collar is well developed, and is supported by median ridge (or septum).The lophophore is large.

=== Differences with related genera ===
Argyrotheca resembles Megathiris, but Argyrotheca has one partition in the middle of the inside of the pedicle valve (the medial dorsal septum) and a lophophore indented in the middle but without lobation of the branches (or schizolophous), while Megathiris has three septa and a lophophore with lobed branches (or ptycholophous). Joania, which was recently split from Argyrotheca, can be distinguished by the radial ribs on the inside of the peduncle valve that end in tubercles somewhat removed from the margin, and a row of tubercles on the edge of the septum.

== Taxonomy ==
A. rubrocostata does not have a brood pouch and has separate sexes. This cast doubts on the monophyly of Argyrotheca.

=== Reassigned species ===
- A. arguta = Joania arguta
- A. cordata = Joania cordata

== Ecology ==
=== Reproduction ===
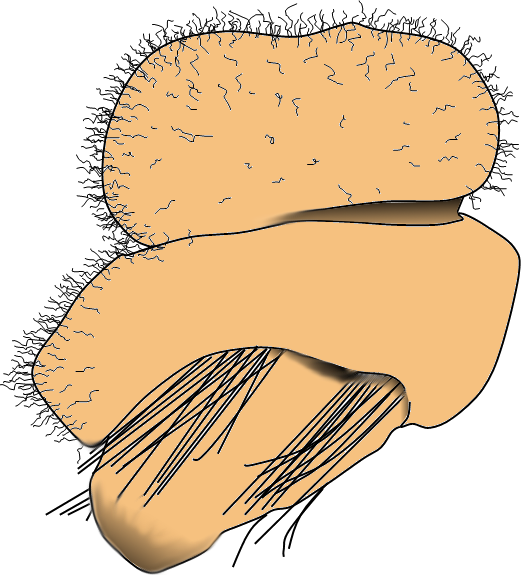
3-lobed larval phase of Argyrotheca cordata, 180μm, lateral view, top apical lobe with long cilia, mid-section mantel lobe, with ventral cilia (left) and 4 bundles of setae (2 visible), bottom pedicle lobe, without cilia

Unique among extant brachiopods, Argyrotheca and Joania are hermaphrodite. Another most unusual specialization, in both these genera, is that the eggs (or ovae) are retained in the enlarged nephridia that act as a brood pouch. Fertilization takes place with its own sperm or after sperms have entered with the inhalant water current. Here early larval development takes place. The fertilized ova develop into ciliated larvae with a feebly free-swimming life of at most a few days before settling and metamorphosis into a tiny brachiopod fixed to the substrate. In A. cordata and A. cistellula in the Mediterranean, ripe eggs and larvae are present year round. A. cuneata however breeds in the autumn. Eggs hatch into gastrulas, followed by a two- and a three-lobed phase during their stay in the brood pouch. The frontal (or apical) lobe has a girdle of long cilia, a middle (mantle) lobe carries a band of cilia in the middle of the belly (or ventral side) and a rear (or pedicle) lobe is without cilia. A. cordata and A. cuneata larvae have 4 bundles of bristles (or setae), while these are lacking in A. cistellula. Extant brachiopods with brood pouches (Megathyridoidea: Argyrotheca and Joania, Gwynioidea: Gwynia, and all Thecideoidea) are very small or minute and have short lives (2 years reported for A. cuneata). This implies that reproduction needs to be both quick and efficient. Being hermaphrodite allows for quick and efficient self-fertilisation, and the brood pouch would reduce predation of the larvae.

=== Attachment ===
Near Bermuda Argyrotheca is mostly found on the underside of leaf-shaped corals, like Agaricia, Mycetophyllia or Montastraea or in between branches of corals, such as Porites, Mussa and Madracis, up to about 75 m. Further down, sponges like Agelas and Plakorthis, and concretions dominante as substrate. A. cuneata in deeper waters near Brazil is commonly found attached to shell fragments like those of bivalves. Elsewhere undersea caves provide shelter in shallow water.

=== Predation ===
One study showed that 3,8% of the empty shells of recent A. cuneata were predated. Three types of hole were distinguished, neat regular borings by a mollusc radula, large irregular ones presumably made by crabs, and bowl shaped hollows with a small opening at the bottom, characteristic for foraminifers. Another study of fossil A. cuneata showed a large difference between two nearby (2 km) and almost contemporary (Middle Miocene, Serravallian) locations in Poland. At Węglin, 23% of the shells had holes, but only 2% at Weglinek. Here two types of holes were distinguished: conical, assigned to naticid molluscs, and cylindrical holes, that are assumed to be made by muricate sea snails. Agyrotheca shakes forcefully when disturbed by animals swimming by and when disposing of particles.

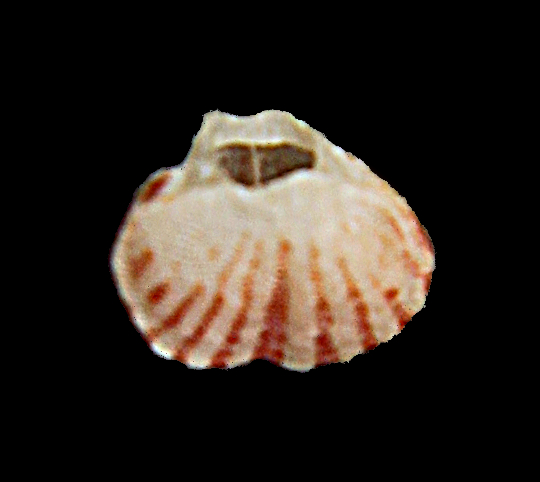
Argyrotheca cuneata, brachial valve, 2 mm across, found at 33 m deep, near Rome, Italy

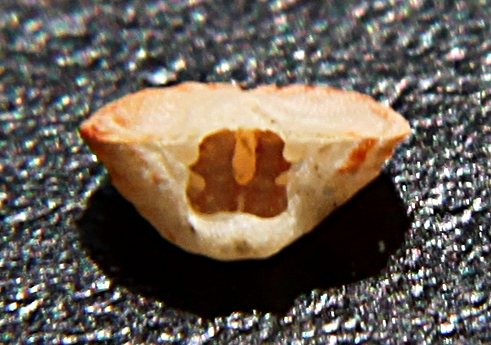
anterior view

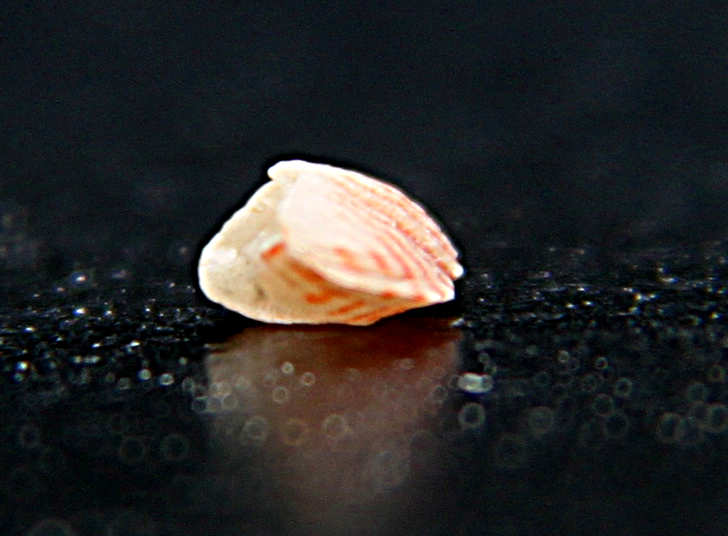
lateral view

== Distribution ==
Argyrotheca is known from the Upper Cretaceous in Europe and North America, from the Eocene in Europe, North and Latin America and the West Indies, from the Oligocene in Europe and Mexico, from the Miocene in Europe, the Russian Federation, North America, the West Indies and New Zealand, and from the Pliocene in England and Italy. It can currently be found in the Atlantic (60-1280m), Pacific (160m), Mediterranean (6-400m), the Red Sea and the Persian Gulf. A. cistellula, A. cordata and A. cuneata are the only species present in the Mediterranean.

== Species ==
=== A. ageriana ===
A. ageriana, has been described from the lower Pleistocene of Italy (Castro Marina, Lecce, Apulia). It lived in a temperate to warm-temperate sea, 75–100 m deep.

=== A. cistellula ===
A. cistellula is a minute brachiopod, dirty white to yellow or grey in color, and has a maximum size of 2 x 3 mm. The brachial valve is rounded rectangular, a bit wider than long, or square in outline. This valve is slightly bilobed. The hinge line is straight and spans the entire width of the shell. Externally the surfaces are smooth or show faint concentric growth lines. The inner surfaces of the shell have small pits (or is endopunctate). The peduncle valve is moderately convex and has a short drop-shape, with a straight beak (or umbo), and a straight margin opposite to the hinge. The opening for the peduncle (or foramen) is large, 1/4-1/3 of the total width and the triangular plates that bridge the distance between the dorsal and ventral surfaces of the shell (or deltidial plates) do not touch. This species attaches itself to hard substrates, in water between 20–100 m. The current known distribution of A. cistellula is Norway, the United Kingdom and Ireland (north-east Scotland, English Channel, west coast of the British Isles), and Italy (Sardinia and Sicily).

=== A. cuneata ===
Living specimens of A. cuneata have been reported from a submarine cave in Cyprus (Cape Greco, 6 m deep, with two other brachiopod species: Novocrania turbinata and Megathyris detruncata), and the Cape Verde Islands (Tarrafal, northwestern coast of Sao Tiago Island, 15 m deep). The species is also reported from the outer shelf (100–200 m deep), off the coast of Brazil (Rio de Janeiro, São Paulo, and Parana states), on carbonate rich sediment, where they are attached to shell fragments like those of bivalves.

=== A. jacksoni ===
A. jacksoni is known from the Red Sea (shallow reef cave at Ras Muhammad, southernmost Sinai Peninsula, Gulf of Aqaba and around Port Sudan) and the Persian Gulf (Karan Island, 27°43’N 49°48.8’E; Jana Island, 27°22.4’N 49°54’E) from a depth between 5 and 16 m. It is close in size and shape to A. cuneata, which differs by having a pink-red wash between the costae.
