= Cnismatocentridae =

Scientific classification
- Kingdom: Animalia
- Phylum: Brachiopoda
- Class: Rhynchonellata
- Order: Terebratulida
- Family: Cnismatocentridae

Family of brachiopods

Cnismatocentridae is a family of brachiopods belonging to the order Terebratulida.

== Genera ==
- †Arcuatothyris
- Cnismatocentrum Dall, 1920
- †Inopinatarculina Ischenko, 2004
- †Nucleatina Kats, 1962
