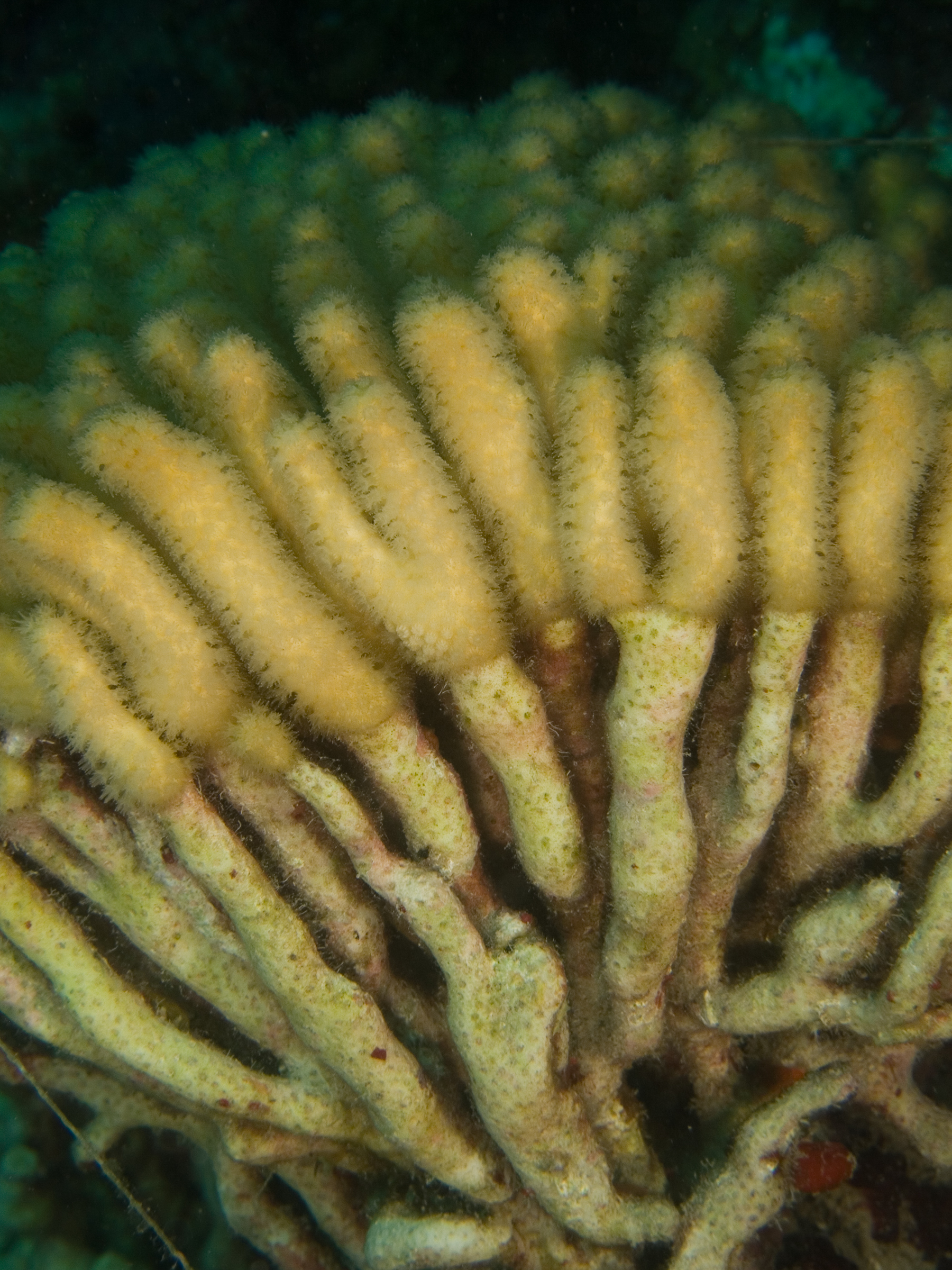
- Broken yellow finger coral showing colony structure

Conservation status
- Least Concern (IUCN 3.1)

Scientific classification
- Kingdom: Animalia
- Phylum: Cnidaria
- Subphylum: Anthozoa
- Class: Hexacorallia
- Order: Scleractinia
- Family: Pocilloporidae
- Genus: Madracis
- Species: M. auretenra

Binomial name
- Madracis auretenra Locke, Weil & Coates, 2007

Synonyms
- Madracis mirabilis sensu Wells, 1973

= Madracis auretenra =

Species of coral

Madracis auretenra, commonly known as the yellow finger coral or yellow pencil coral, is a colonial species of stony coral in the family Pocilloporidae. It is a fairly common species and is found in the Caribbean Sea and western Atlantic Ocean. At one time this species was not recognised, but it was split from Madracis mirabilis on the grounds of morphology and depth range.

== Taxonomy ==
In 2007, Locke, Weil & Coates erected a new species of Madracis coral from the Caribbean Sea and named it Madracis auretenra. They distinguished between this species and Madracis mirabilis (Duchassaing & Michelotti 1860), a deep-water species, on the grounds of the new species' thin-branched, dendritic structure, and its depth range (1 to 60 m (3 ft 3 in to 196 ft 10 in)). Other characteristics that distinguished the new species from others include the presence of base skeletal structures devoid of living tissue, a fairly smooth coenosteum, a distinct line of spines between the corallites, and the absence of secondary septa in the closely spaced corallites. In erecting this species they pointed out that "Authors of many recent studies on Madracis mirabilis sensu Wells will need to reconsider and reconfirm the identities of their study organisms".

== Description ==
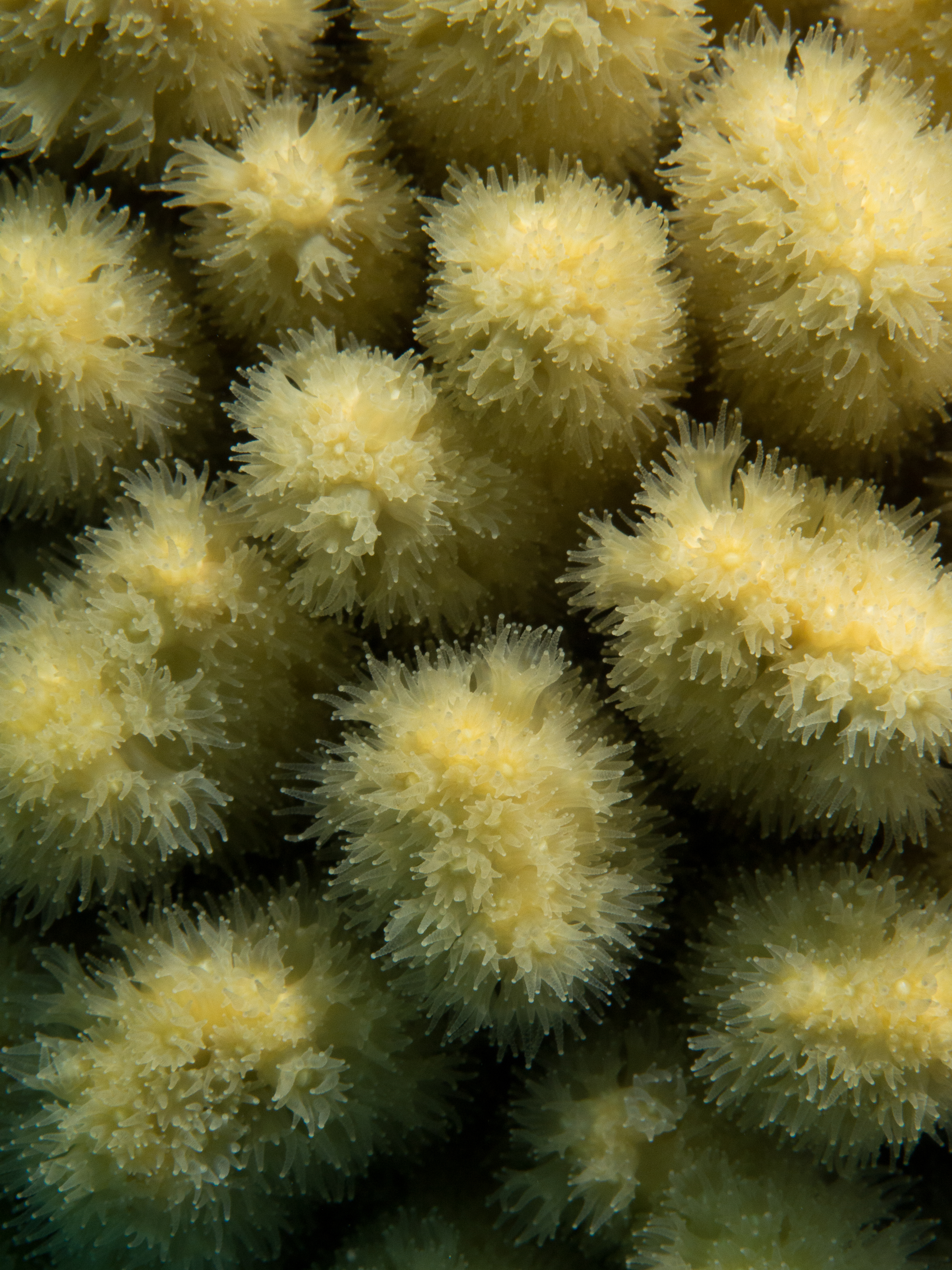
a close up photo of Madracis auretenra showing the polyps

Madracis auretenra forms hemispherical clumps that can be a metre or more across. Each colony is formed of densely packed, cylindrical branches with blunt, finger-like tips. In fore-reef habitats the branches are slender but in back-reef and lagoon habitats they are more robust and the clumps are larger. The hard skeletal material of which the colony is built is in most coral species covered by a thin layer of living tissue, the coenosarc. M. auretenra is unusual in this respect because, as the coral grows, the coenosarc progressively dies back on the lower parts of the branches leaving the skeleton bare, and only the tips of the branches are covered with living tissue. The corallites are from 1.1 to 1.6 mm (0.04 to 0.06 in) in diameter and have at least ten septa. This coral is bright yellow.

== Ecology ==
Madracis auretenra is a zooxanthellate coral, housing symbiotic single-celled protists within its tissues. These provide the products of photosynthesis to the coral and use some of the coral's waste products. To supplement this food supply, the coral polyps spread their tentacles to catch zooplankton, feeding mostly on the larvae of crustaceans, polychaete worms and arrow worms.

M. auretenra is a hermaphrodite; individual colonies contain both male and female gonads. Liberation of gametes into the sea is linked to the phase of the moon and other factors. After fertilisation, the planula larvae form part of the plankton and eventually settle on the seabed and undergo metamorphosis into polyps. In some instances, M. auretenra has been observed to retain the gametes on its mesenteries and pseudo-brood the larvae briefly before liberating them into the sea.

M. auretenra also reproduces readily by fragmentation, a form of asexual reproduction. Even quite small fragments of the coral are able to survive and grow into new colonies; survival rates in trial studies varied between 29 and 81%, with the rates being highest in fore-reef environments and lowest in lagoons where there were higher levels of sedimentation.

M. auretenra has been used as a study organism to predict the effects of ocean acidification on corals. By manipulating the composition of modified sea water in which the corals were kept, it has been shown that the carbonate or aragonite concentration of the water, the factor usually considered as important predictors, was less relevant than the bicarbonate concentration.
