= Dyscolia =

Scientific classification
- Domain: Eukaryota
- Kingdom: Animalia
- Phylum: Brachiopoda
- Class: Rhynchonellata
- Order: Terebratulida
- Family: Dyscoliidae
- Genus: Dyscolia; Fischer & Oehlert, 1890

Genus of brachiopods

Dyscolia is a genus of brachiopods belonging to the family Dyscoliidae.

The species of this genus are found in all oceans.

Species:

- Dyscolia johannisdavisi (Alcock, 1894)
- Dyscolia radiata Cooper, 1981
- Dyscolia subquadrata (Jeffreys, 1878)
- Dyscolia wyvillei (Davidson, 1878)
