= Joania =

Scientific classification
- Domain: Eukaryota
- Kingdom: Animalia
- Phylum: Brachiopoda
- Class: Rhynchonellata
- Order: Terebratulida
- Family: Megathyrididae
- Genus: Joania; Alvarez, Brunton & Long, 2008

Genus of brachiopods

Joania is a genus of brachiopods belonging to the family Megathyrididae.

The species of this genus are found in Southern Europe and Northern Africa.

Species:

- Joania arguta (Grant, 1983)
- Joania cordata (Risso, 1826)
- Joania peyrerensis Bitner et al., 2013
- Joania ukrainica Bitner & Müller, 2017
