= Dallinella =

Scientific classification
- Domain: Eukaryota
- Kingdom: Animalia
- Phylum: Brachiopoda
- Class: Rhynchonellata
- Order: Terebratulida
- Family: Terebrataliidae
- Genus: Dallinella; Thomson, 1915

Genus of brachiopods

Dallinella is a genus of brachiopods belonging to the family Terebrataliidae.

The species of this genus are found in Northern America.

Species:

- Dallinella obsoleta (Beecher, 1893)
- Dallinella occidentalis (Dall, 1871)
