= Xenobrochus =

Scientific classification
- Domain: Eukaryota
- Kingdom: Animalia
- Phylum: Brachiopoda
- Class: Rhynchonellata
- Order: Terebratulida
- Family: Dyscoliidae
- Genus: Xenobrochus; Cooper, 1981

Genus of brachiopods

Xenobrochus is a genus of brachiopods belonging to the family Dyscoliidae.

The species of this genus are found in Southern Africa.

Species:

- Xenobrochus africanus (Cooper, 1973)
- Xenobrochus agulhasensis (Helmcke, 1938)
- Xenobrochus australis Cooper, 1981
- Xenobrochus indianensis (Cooper, 1973)
- Xenobrochus naudei Hiller, 1986
- Xenobrochus norfolkensis Bitner, 2011
- Xenobrochus rotundus Bitner, 2008
- Xenobrochus translucidus (Dall, 1920)
