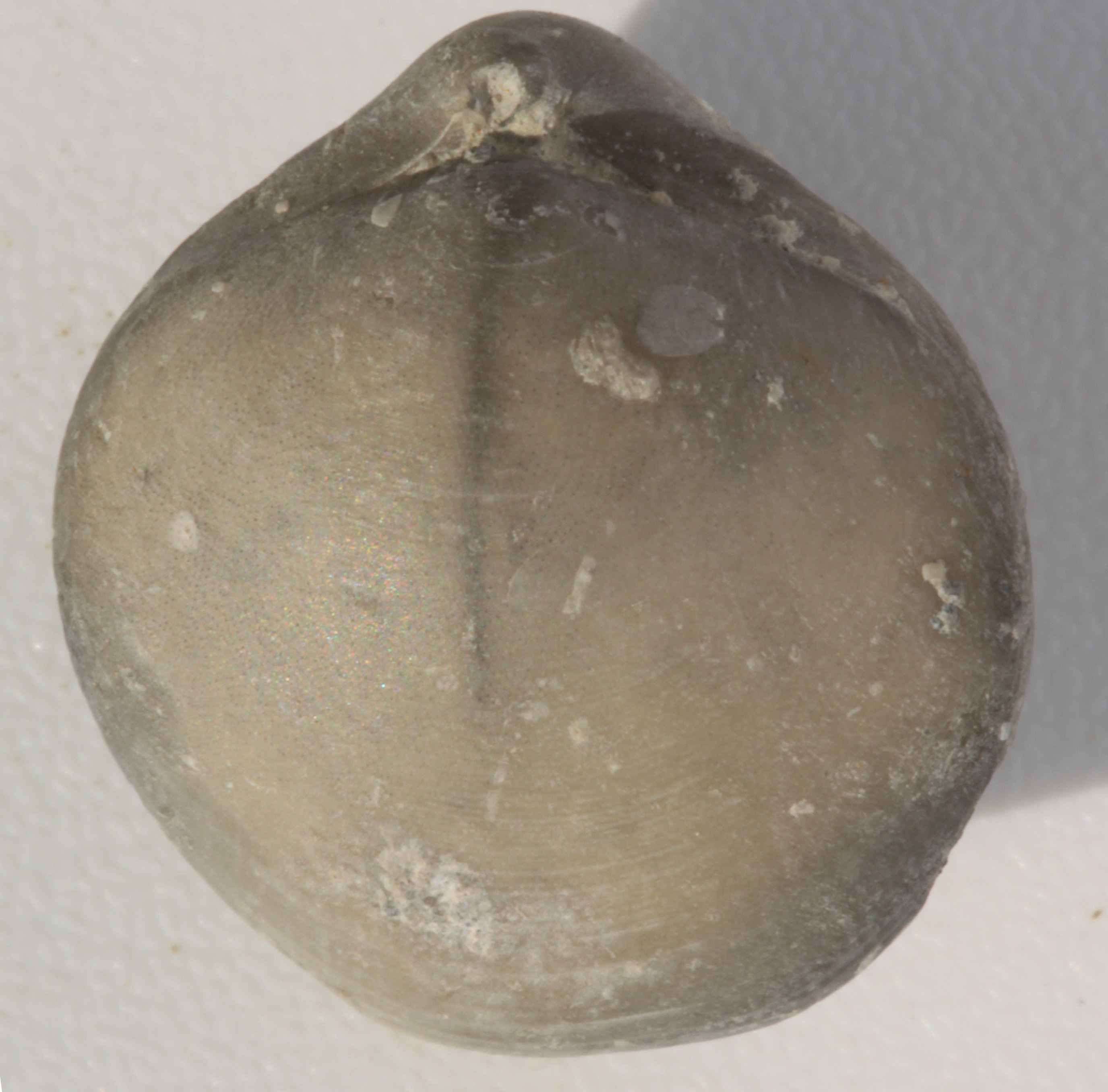
- Waconella wacoensis (Roemer, 1852)

Scientific classification
- Domain: Eukaryota
- Kingdom: Animalia
- Phylum: Brachiopoda
- Class: Rhynchonellata
- Order: Terebratulida
- Family: Kingenidae; Elliot, 1948

= Kingenidae =

Family of brachiopods

Kingenidae is a family of brachiopods belonging to the order Terebratulida.

== Genera ==
The following genera are included in Kingenidae:

- Aldingia Thomson, 1916
- Belothyris Smirnova, 1960
- Dictyothyropsis Barczyk, 1969
- Dzirulina Nutsubidze, 1945
- Kingena Davidson, 1852
- Paraldingia Richardson, 1973
- Waconella Owen, 1970
- Zeuschneria Smirnova, 1975
- Zittelina Rollier, 1919
