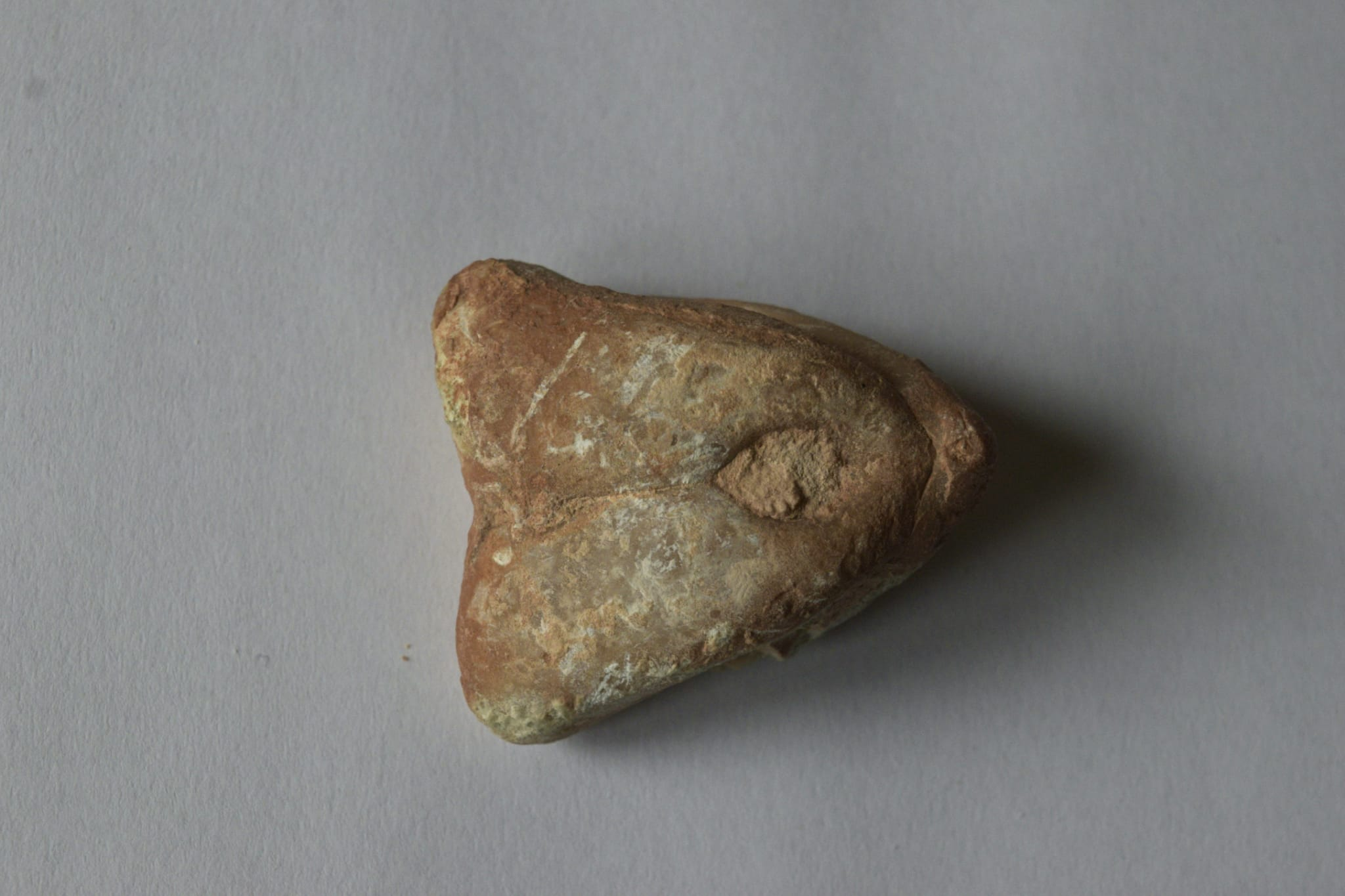
- Fossil specimen of Pygope sp. from Spain, Guadalajara

Scientific classification
- Kingdom: Animalia
- Phylum: Brachiopoda
- Class: Rhynchonellata
- Order: Terebratulida
- Family: †Pygopidae
- Genus: †Pygope; Link, 1830

Species
- P. dilatata Catullo, 1851 ("type) = Terebratula dilatata; P. catulloi (Pictet, 1867); P. diphya Buch, 1838 = Terebratula diphya, T. antinomia, T. deltoidea, T. diphoros, T. triquetra, Antinomia angulata, A. diphora; P. diphyoides (D'Orbigny, 1847) = Terebratula diphyoides, Antinomia diphya, A. deltoidea, Pygites diphyoides; P. erbaensis (Suess, 1852) = Terebratula erbaensis, T. lampas, T. incisiva; P. euganeensis (Pictet, 1867) = Terebratula euganeensis; P. janitor (Pictet, 1867) = Terebratula janitor, T. duvallue, P. duvali; P. rectangularis (Pictet, 1867) = Terebratula rectangularis, P. triangulus (Lamarck, 1819) = Terebratula triangulus, P. mutica, T. pileus, Antinomia pileus

Synonyms
- Antinomia

= Pygope =

Pygope Temporal range: Kimmeridgian–Barremian

Extinct genus of brachiopods

Pygope is an extinct genus of brachiopods belonging to the family Pygopidae. These brachiopods lived in open sea from the Jurassic Period, Kimmeridgian age (152.1–157.3 mya) up to Cretaceous Period, Barremian age (125.0–~129.4 mya). Some of the species are characterised by a smaller or larger perforation through the entire shell in older specimens, while others just have a depression somewhere on the midline. Younger specimens of the perforated species develop a heart-shape and subsequently both extensions merge, thus encircling a central passage which is in fact entirely outside the shell.

== Distribution ==
- P. catulloi occurs in Upper Jurassic (Tithonian) to Lower Cretaceous (Valanginian) of Austria, Bulgaria, Hungary, Italy, Poland, Romania and Switzerland.
- P. diphya has been found in the Lower Cretaceous of Poland (Early Berriasian, Rogoza Klippes, Rogoznik, 49.5° N, 19.9° E, Euxinus Zone-Occitanica Zone, Sobotka and Korowa Member, Dursztyn Formation, Cisowa Skala, Bursukowa Skala, Lysa Skala, and Czorsztyn-Sobotka, 49.0° N, 20.0° E), Slovakia (Berriasian, Rogoznik Member, Durstyn Formation), Kyjov, Puste Pole, 49.0° N, 20.0° E).
- P. janitor is present in the Upper Jurassic of Bulgaria (Kimmeridgian, Lacunosella sparcicosta zone, Nechinska Bara, Gorno Belotintsi, 43.5° N, 22.9° E), Hungary (Lower Tithonian, Szel-hegy, Gerecse Mts, 47.0° N, 18.0° E), Poland (Early through to Late Titonian, Rogoza Klippes, Rogoznik, 49.5° N, 19.9° E), the Lower Cretaceous of Greenland (North Mols Bjerge, Traill Island, and Brorson Halvo, Wollaston Forland, both Lower Valanginian, Albrechts Bugt Member, Palnatokes Bjerg Formation east Greenland) and Poland (Berriasian, Euxinus Zone-Occitanica Zone, Sobotka and Korowa Member, Dursztyn Formation, Cisowa Skala, Lysa Skala, Bursukowa Skala, Czorsztyn-Sobotka and 49.0° N, 20.0° E).
