= Cnismatocentrum =

Scientific classification
- Domain: Eukaryota
- Kingdom: Animalia
- Phylum: Brachiopoda
- Class: Rhynchonellata
- Order: Terebratulida
- Family: Cnismatocentridae
- Genus: Cnismatocentrum

Genus of brachiopods

Cnismatocentrum is a genus of brachiopods belonging to the family Cnismatocentridae.

Species:

- Cnismatocentrum parvum Zezina, 1970
- Cnismatocentrum sakalinensis
- Cnismatocentrum sakhalinensis (Dall, 1908)
