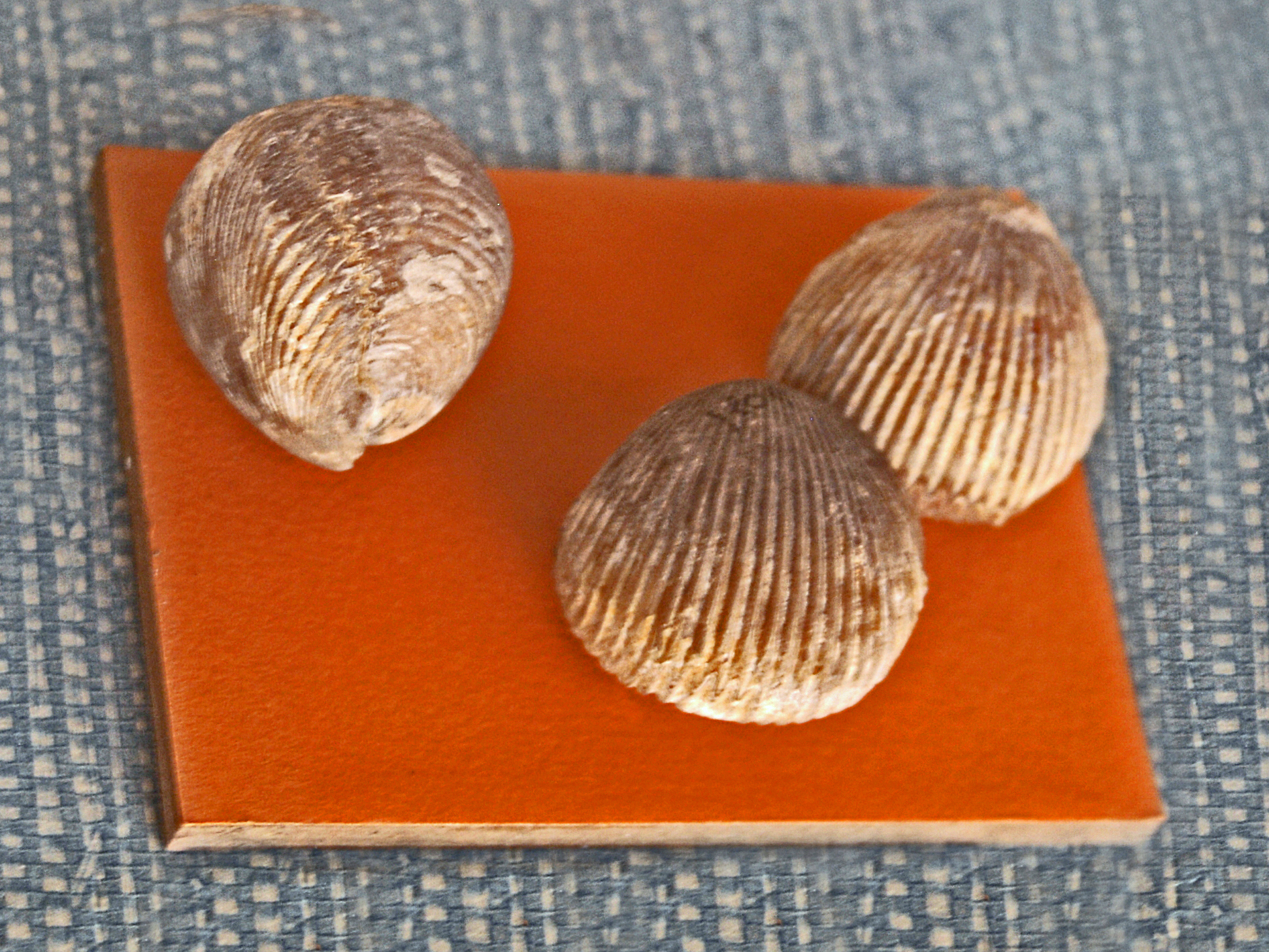
- Fossil of Sphenorhynchia plicatella from France, on display at Galerie de paléontologie et d'anatomie comparée in Paris

Scientific classification
- Kingdom: Animalia
- Phylum: Brachiopoda
- Class: Rhynchonellata
- Order: Rhynchonellida
- Family: †Prionorhynchiidae
- Genus: †Sphenorhynchia; Buckman, 1914

= Sphenorhynchia =

Sphenorhynchia Temporal range: Jurassic

Genus of brachiopods

Sphenorhynchia is an extinct genus of brachiopods belonging to the family Prionorhynchiidae.

These brachiopods are stationary epifaunal suspension feeders. They lived in the Jurassic period, from 183.0 to 164.7 Ma. Fossils of this genus have been found in the sediments of Afghanistan, Bulgaria, France, Germany, Italy, Saudi Arabia and Slovakia.

== Species ==
- Sphenorhynchia angulata Cooper 1989
- Sphenorhynchia bugeysiaca Riche 1893
- Sphenorhynchia ferryi Deslongchamps 1859
- Sphenorhynchia latereplanata Seifert 1963
- Sphenorhynchia plicatella Sowerby 1825
- Sphenorhynchia varicostata Cooper 1989
