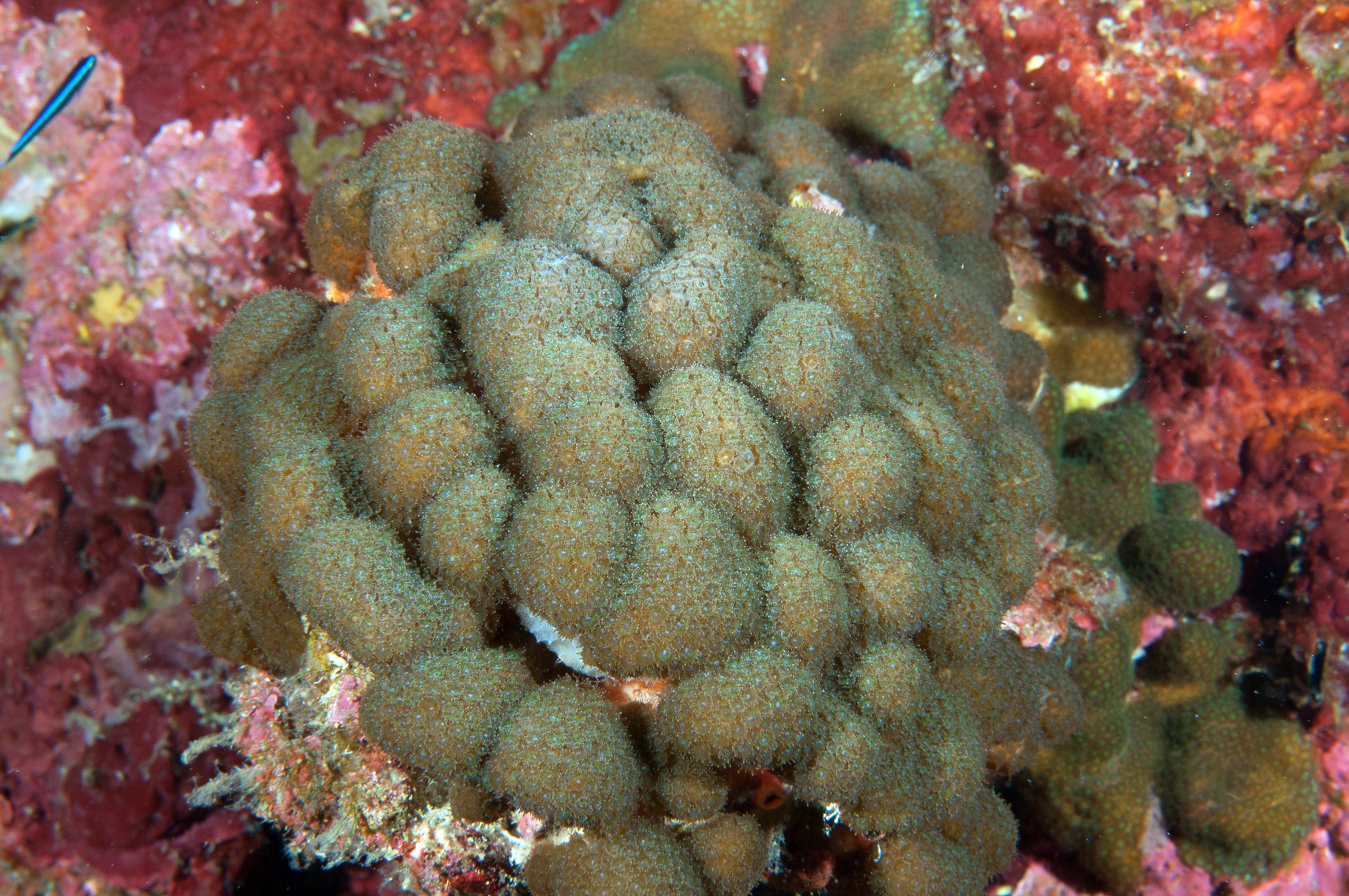
- Madracis decactis

Scientific classification
- Domain: Eukaryota
- Kingdom: Animalia
- Phylum: Cnidaria
- Subphylum: Anthozoa
- Class: Hexacorallia
- Order: Scleractinia
- Family: Pocilloporidae
- Genus: Madracis; Milne Edwards & Haime, 1849

Species
- See text.

Synonyms
- Axhelia Milne Edwards & Haime, 1849; Axohelia Milne Edwards & Haime, 1857; Pentalophora Saville Kent, 1871; Reussia Duchassaing & Michelotti, 1860

= Madracis =

Genus of corals

Madracis is a genus of cnidarians belonging to the family Pocilloporidae. The genus has a cosmopolitan distribution.

== Description ==
Madracis contains deep water azooxanthellate colonial species. They have a diverse array of growth forms, including fragile branching, dense ramose coralla, massive columnar, nodular and encrusting forms.

== Species ==
The following species are recognised:

- Madracis asanoi Yabe & Sugiyama, 1936
- Madracis asperula Milne Edwards & Haime, 1849
- Madracis auretenra Locke, Weil & Coates, 2007
- Madracis brueggemanni (Ridley, 1881)
- Madracis carmabi Vermeij, Diekmann & Bak, 2003
- † Madracis crescentensis Durham, 1942
- Madracis decactis (Lyman, 1859)
- † Madracis densa Budd, 1992
- † Madracis dodecachora Squires, 1958
- † Madracis duncani Wells, 1945
- Madracis formosa Wells, 1973
- Madracis fragilis Neves & Johnsson, 2009
- † Madracis ganei Vaughan, 1900
- † Madracis gregorioi Vaughan, 1900
- Madracis hellana Milne Edwards & Haime, 1850
- † Madracis herrecki Wells, 1934
- Madracis interjecta Marenzeller, 1907
- † Madracis johnsoni Vaughan, 1900
- † Madracis johnwellsi Frost & Langenheim, 1974
- Madracis kauaiensis Vaughan, 1907
- Madracis kirbyi Veron & Pichon, 1976
- Madracis myriaster (Milne Edwards & Haime, 1850)
- Madracis pharensis (Heller, 1868)
- Madracis profunda Zibrowius, 1980
- † Madracis senaria Wells, 1973
- † Madracis stewarti Durham, 1942
- † Madracis vaughani Wells, 1941
