= Tetrarhynchia =

Tetrarhynchia Temporal range: 199–161 Ma Jurassic

Scientific classification
- Kingdom: Animalia
- Phylum: Brachiopoda
- Class: Rhynchonellata
- Order: Rhynchonellida
- Family: †Tetrarhynchiidae
- Genus: †Tetrarhynchia; Buckman, 1917

Type species
- Terebratula tetraedra Sowerby, 1812

Synonyms
- Makridinirhynchia Sucic-Protic, 1969

Extinct genus of brachiopods

Tetrarhynchia is an extinct genus of brachiopods found in Jurassic strata in Europe and South America. It was a stationary epifaunal suspension feeder.
