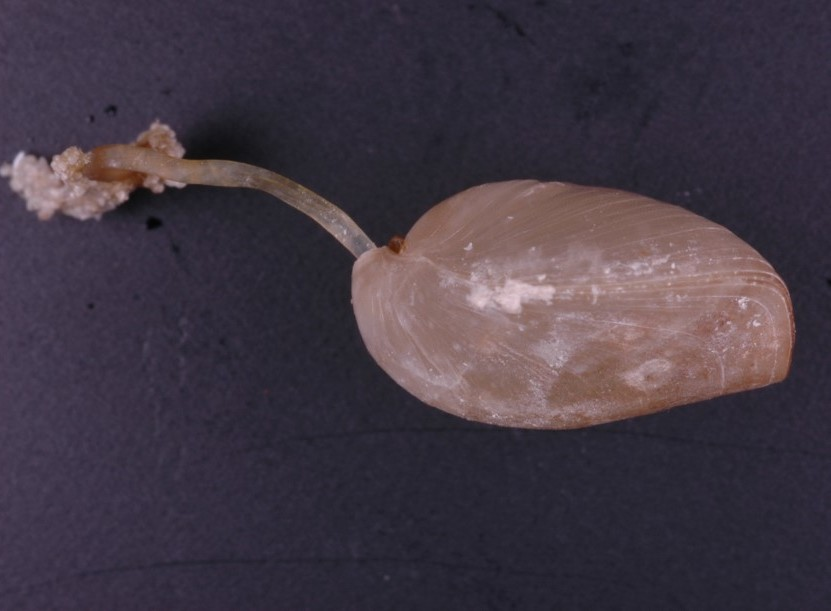
- Abyssothyris wyvillei

Scientific classification
- Kingdom: Animalia
- Phylum: Brachiopoda
- Class: Rhynchonellata
- Order: Terebratulida
- Family: Dyscoliidae
- Genus: Abyssothyris; Thomson, 1927

= Abyssothyris =

Genus of brachiopods

Abyssothyris is a genus of brachiopods belonging to the family Dyscoliidae.

The genus was first described in 1927 by J.A. Thomson.

== Species ==
Species listed at GBIF:

- Abyssothyris briggsi Cooper, 1978
- Abyssothyris wyvillei (Davidson, 1878)
