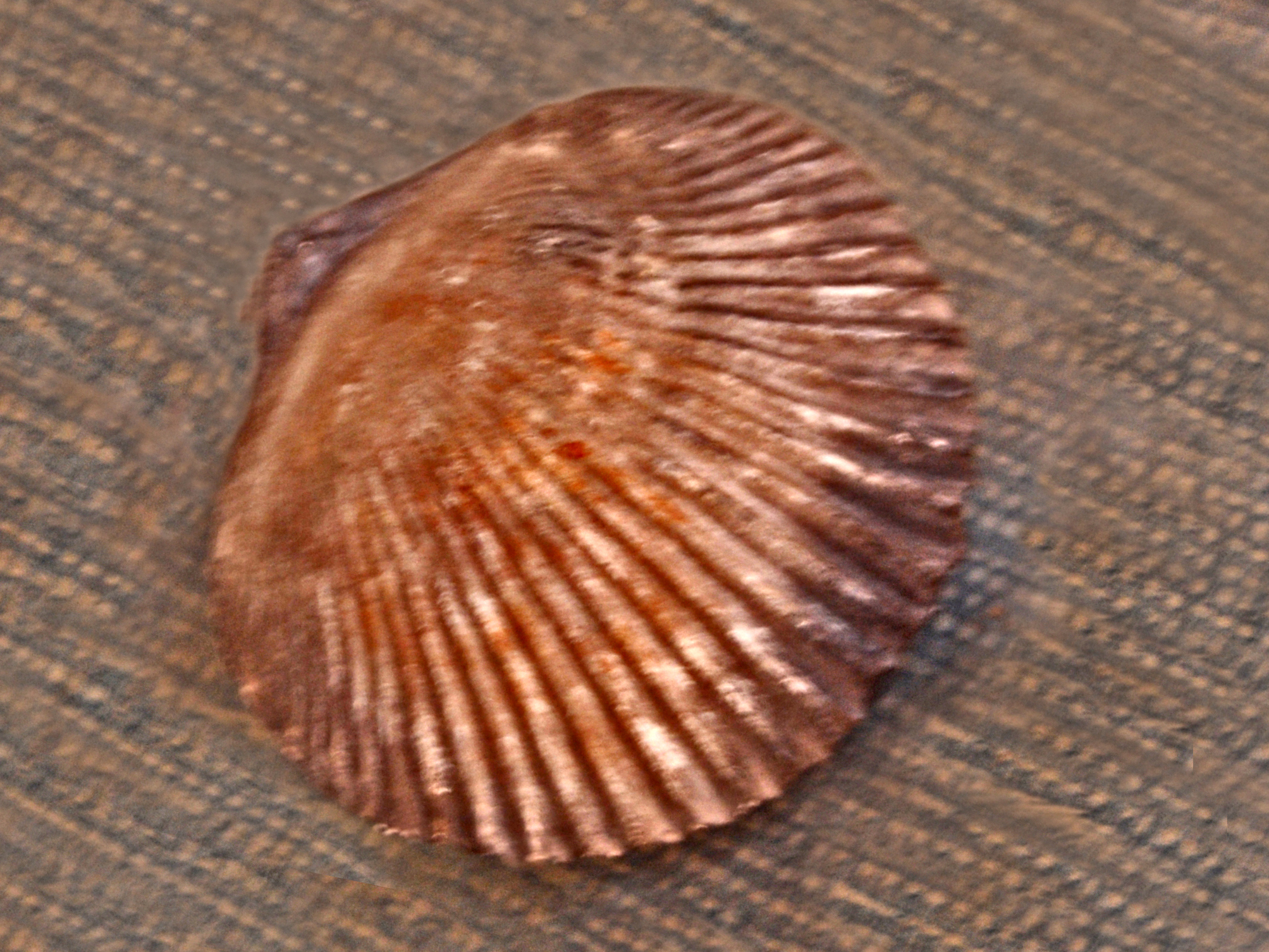
- Fossil of Peregrinella multicarinata from France, on display at Galerie de paléontologie et d'anatomie comparée in Paris

Scientific classification
- Kingdom: Animalia
- Phylum: Brachiopoda
- Class: Rhynchonellata
- Order: Rhynchonellida
- Family: †Dimerellidae
- Genus: †Peregrinella; Oehlert in Fischer, 1887

= Peregrinella =

Peregrinella Temporal range: Berriasian-Hauterivian ~140–130 Ma

Extinct rhynchonellid genus

Peregrinella is an extinct Early Cretaceous rhynchonellid genus with scattered, global representation from North America to Europe and Tibet. These brachiopods are stationary epifaunal suspension feeders, its most distinguishing feature is the size, considered to be the largest of all Mesozoic rhynchonellids, which has long puzzled paleontologists because of its unusual morphology, stratigraphic occurrence, and distribution patterns.

== Distribution ==
Fossils of the genus have been found in:

- Chebo Formation, Tibet
- Curnier Limestone, France
- Maiolica Formation, Italy
- Raciborsko, Poland
- Chisana Formation, Alaska

== Habitat ==
Limestones yielding Peregrinella frequently occur as large detached blocks occasionally displaying strong calcification and silification. Within such blocks Peregrinella has been observed in crowded assemblages of individuals of various age, mainly associated with ammonites. The paleoecological and evolutionary significance of any purported fossil vent-seep restricted brachiopod can be understood only if its ancient habitat is correctly identified in the stratigraphic record.

To date, three Peregrinella-bearing limestones have unequivocally been identified as ancient methane-seep deposits using a combination of petrographic, stable isotope, and biomarker analyses. Appropriate material to carry out at least some of these analyses was available from a further seven localities: Bonanza Creek, Curnier, Incoronata, Musenalp, Raciborsko, Rice Valley, and Rottier. Characteristic petrographic features of seep carbonates are authigenic, early diagenetic carbonate phases, such as microcrystalline calcite(micrite), yellow calcite, and banded and botryoidal aggregates of fibrous cement and the carbon isotope signature of these early diagenetic carbonate phases typically have very negative δ 13 C signatures, significantly lower than marine bicarbonate and occasionally even lower than 50‰.

In combination with the lowest δ13C carbonate values of -6.9% found for the Curnier Limestone, the observed lipid patterns are best explained by anaerobic oxidation of methane at a seafloor seep. The seepage fluids also may have included crude oil or, alternatively, oil may have intruded the limestone at a later stage. Unlike the Curnier Limestone, no biomarker evidence for seepage was found for the Musenalp Limestone, agreeing with its marine δ13 C carbonate values. No irregular isoprenoids were detected in the Musenalp sample, and the regular isoprenoids pristane and phytane as well as n-alkanes yielded δ13C values (- 31 to - 30‰) that are typical for lipids resulting from marine primary production in the photic zone. Peregrinella coexisted with virtually all coeval seep mollusks, as well as occasional tube worms and sponges. Neither the origin nor the extinction of Peregrinella coincides with the origin or extinction of any coeval seep-inhabiting mollusk.

== Environmental impacts on Peregrinella ==
The intensity of seep fluid flow plays a major role in structuring seep communities today because some taxa prefer sites with focused, advective fluid flow while others prefer sites of slow, diffusive seepage. The apparent restriction of this genus to seeps suggest that it benefited, in as-yet unknown ways, from the seeping fluids and the reduced compounds in them. Most likely, it benefited from chemotrophic bacteria using methane and/or sulfide, but whether Peregrinella was filter-feeding on free living bacterial plankton, for example like modern vent and seep inhabiting barnacles or had a symbiotic relationship with such bacteria, remains unknown.

Paleo-temperatures calculated from δ18O values of Peregrinella shells indicate that these specimens lived at temperatures ranging from 10 to 19 °C (50 to 66 °F). At some localities different shells showed a remarkably uniform range of values, while at other localities different shells showed a wide scatter of values.

== Morphology ==
Peregrinella has long been viewed as a paleontological curiosity because of its distinctive morphology, anomalous stratigraphic associations, and extensive, yet discontinuous paleogeographic distribution throughout Early Cretaceous continental margin areas of western North America and Tethyan Eurasia. For example, its relatively colossal proportions (to 9.8 centimetres (3.9 in) long, 12 centimetres (4.7 in) wide, 5.6 centimetres (2.2 in) thick) qualify Peregrinella as the largest of all Mesozoic Rhynchonellides, and its characteristic features (most notably its internal mergifer crura, or elongate calcareous supports for the lophophore) discriminates it from other genus.

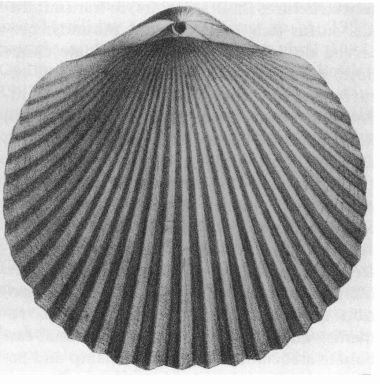
Lamarck's original specimen of Peregrinella multicarinata, from the French Alps, as first figured by Davidson (1850:plate XIV, fig. 37).Length and width of specimen 7.6 centimetres (3.0 in).

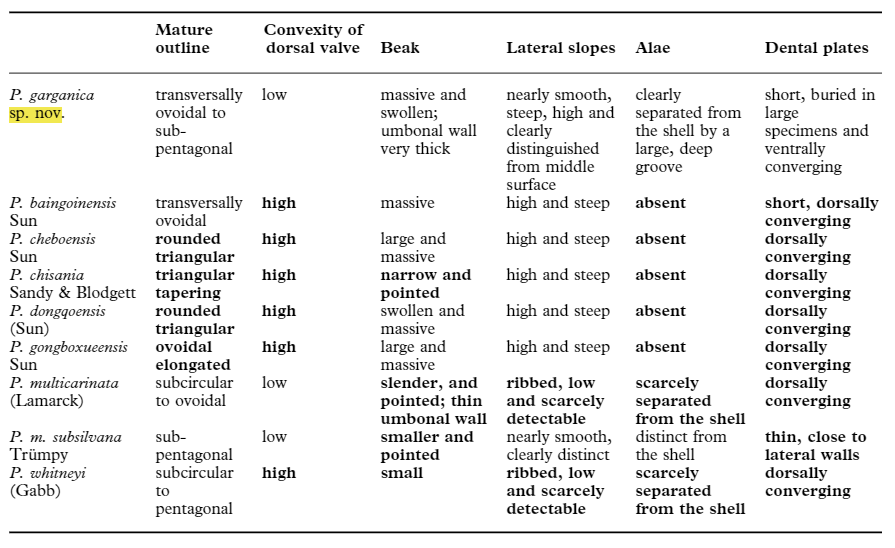
Comparisons between the morphology of Peregrinella garganica sp. nov. and all other known Peregrinella species with non-branching ribs. Major differences are in bold.

== Age ==
After analyzing data from various locations, Sr-isotope stratigraphic investigation confirms that oldest and youngest biostratigraphically well-dated occurrences as late Berriasian and early Hauterivian, respectively. Peregrinella originated in the late Berriasian and most likely became extinct at the end of the early Hauterivian, giving it a geologic range of 9.0 (+1.45/20.85) million years.

The timing of the appearance and disappearance of Peregrinella is puzzling, because neither does it coincide with the appearance and disappearance of any other seep-inhabiting taxon, nor with any of the major oceanic disturbances such as oceanic anoxic events (OAEs). Its extinction at the end of the early Hauterivian roughly coincides with the 'Faraoni event', a presumed, short-lived anoxic event in the late Hauterivian, but this event was apparently restricted to the Tethyan Realm and does not explain the disappearance of Peregrinella from California and Alaska.
