= Kingena =

Kingena Temporal range: Cretaceous - early Paleocene

Scientific classification
- Kingdom: Animalia
- Phylum: Brachiopoda
- Class: Rhynchonellata
- Order: Terebratulida
- Family: Kingenidae
- Genus: †Kingena; Davidson, 1852

Type species
- Terebratula lima Defrance, 1828

Extinct genus of brachiopods

Kingena is an extinct genus of primarily Cretaceous-aged brachiopods of the family Kingenidae whose fossils are found in marine strata of Antarctica, Europe, and New Zealand. Early Paleocene-aged fossils from Denmark represent the youngest species.

== Taxonomy ==
Nearctic members have been excluded from this genus by Owen in 1970 and instead represent a separate genus, Waconella.

== Select species ==
- Kingena blackmorei Owen, 1970
- Kingena concinna Owen, 1970
- Kingena elegans Owen, 1970
- Kingena limburgica Simon, 2005
- Kingena mesembrina (Etheridge, 1913)
- Kingena pentangulata Woodward, 1833
- Kingena simiensis Waring, 1917
