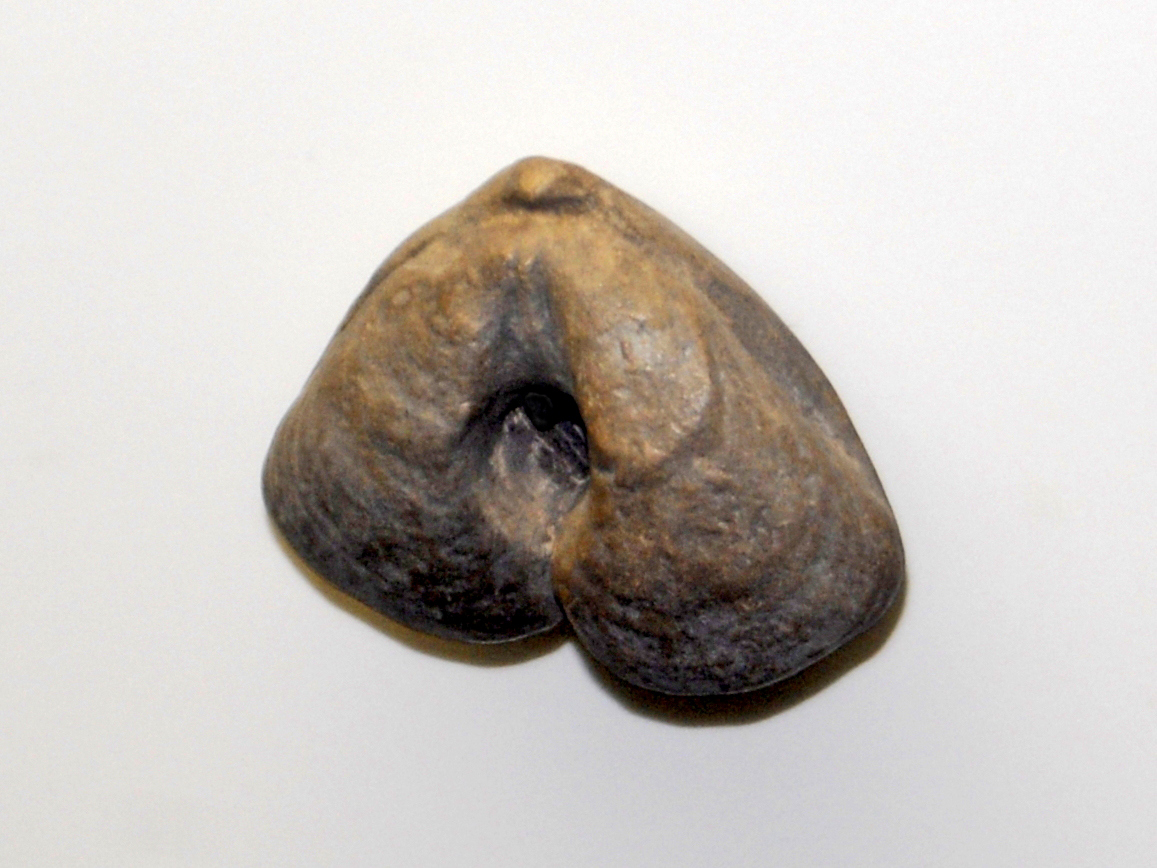
- Fossil specimen of Pygope diphyoidea from France, Cretaceous

Scientific classification
- Kingdom: Animalia
- Phylum: Brachiopoda
- Class: Rhynchonellata
- Order: Terebratulida
- Superfamily: Dyscolioidea
- Family: †Pygopidae; Boulenger, 1884

= Pygopidae =

Pygopidae Temporal range: 150.8–130.0 Ma

Extinct family of brachiopods

Pygopidae is an extinct family of brachiopods.
