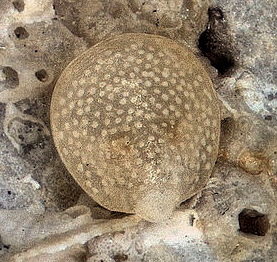
- Gwynia capsula, 1mm
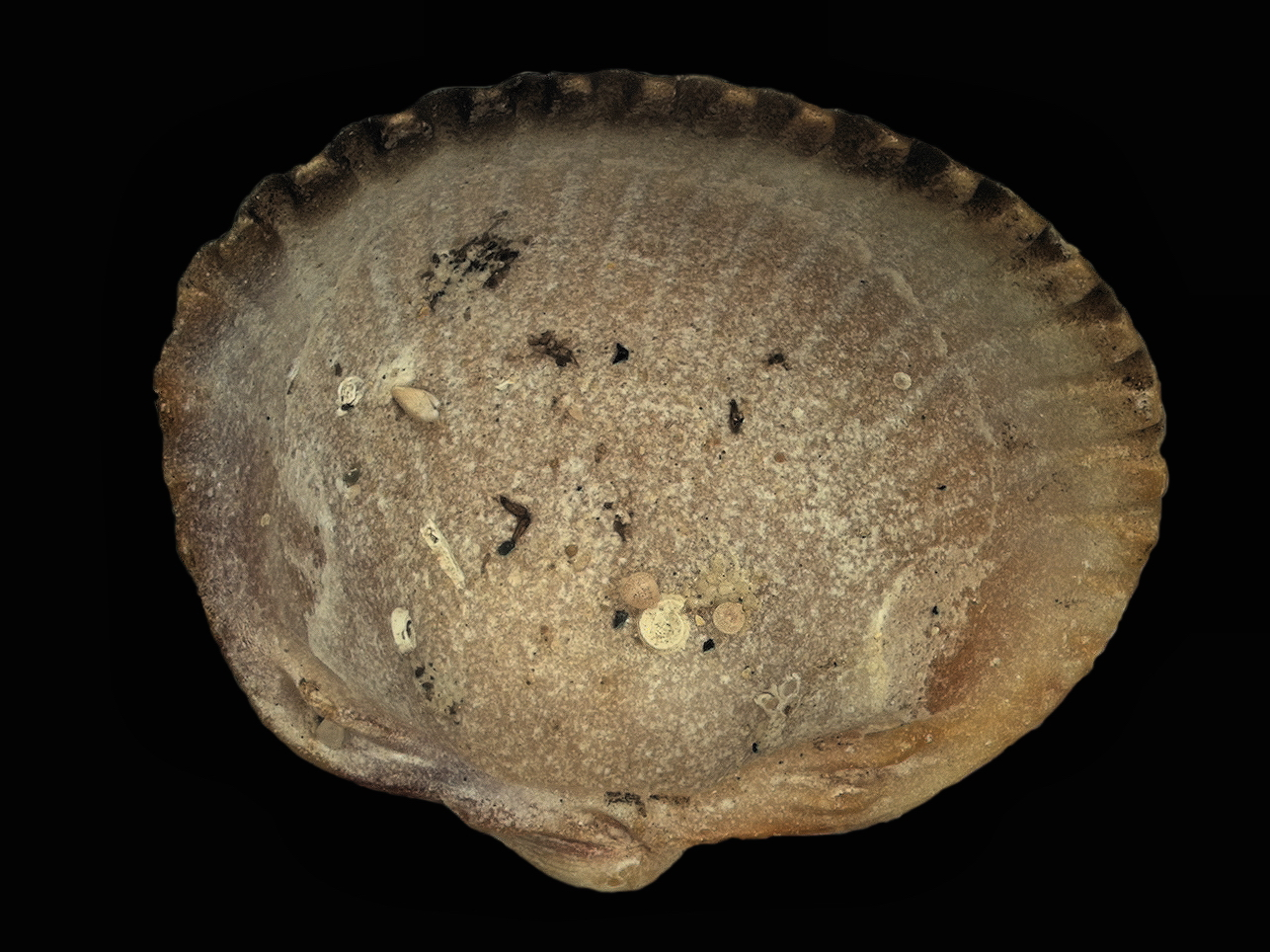
- Gwynia capsula

Scientific classification
- Kingdom: Animalia
- Phylum: Brachiopoda
- Class: Rhynchonellata
- Order: Terebratulida
- Family: Megathyrididae
- Genus: Gwynia; King, 1859

Species
- Gwynia capsula (Jeffreys, 1859); Gwynia macrodentata Lüter, 2008

= Gwynia =

Gwynia Temporal range: Pleistocene–Recent

Genus of brachiopods

Gwynia is a genus of brachiopods that belongs to the family Megathyrididae. Members of this genus are found most often occurring throughout the British Isles and Normandy however there have been records recorded from the Croatian Coast of the Adriatic Sea. It is very small to minute with mature articulated specimens being the smallest brachiopod known. They commonly have a maximum size of less than 1.5 mm. Its shells were ovular or globular in shape and have a white-yellowish coloration.

The genus had evolved a distinctive reproductive strategy where it held its minute larvae within a brood pouch during their development.

== Distribution ==
Gwynia is a genus that has been most commonly found occurring throughout the British Isles and on the continental side of the English Channel in regions such as Normandy (France), Belgium and the Netherlands.

During the last half of the nineteenth century, this genus has only been throughout the British Isles and the continental side of the English Channel. However, its geographic range was significantly expanded with the discovery specimens in submarine caves located along the Croatian coast in the Adriatic Sea. Specimens have also been found in the German Bight.

== Taxonomy ==
The genus is a rhynchonellata brachiopod that belongs to the order Terebratulida. The genus is a part of the family Megathyrididae. A case can be made for Gwynia being a paedomorphic descendant of Zellania however there is a considerable time gap between modern Gwynia and the Middle Jurassic Zellania.

=== Species ===
There are two species in the genus:

- Gwynia capsula (Jeffreys, 1859)
- Gwynia macrodentata Lüter, 2008

=== Taxonomic history ===
The genus was originally described in 1859 by William King, an Anglo-Irish geologist and paleontologist. He described the new genus based on specimens described by John Gwyn Jeffreys, a British conchologist and malacologist, that were collected from the coast of Normandy and the Belfast Lough inlet sea. Additional unpublished specimens would also be collected during the 1850s from Larne and Portrush in Northern Ireland. These specimens would be the last sightings of the taxon around Ireland.

Thomas Davidson, a Scottish paleontologist, believed that Gwynia had not yet been sufficiently determined to be its own genus despite having distinctive characteristics. Many have suggested that this genus is an immature form of other brachiopod species such as Argyrotheca cistellula, which this genus often co-occurs with, and Zellania davidsoni from the Middle Jurassic period.
