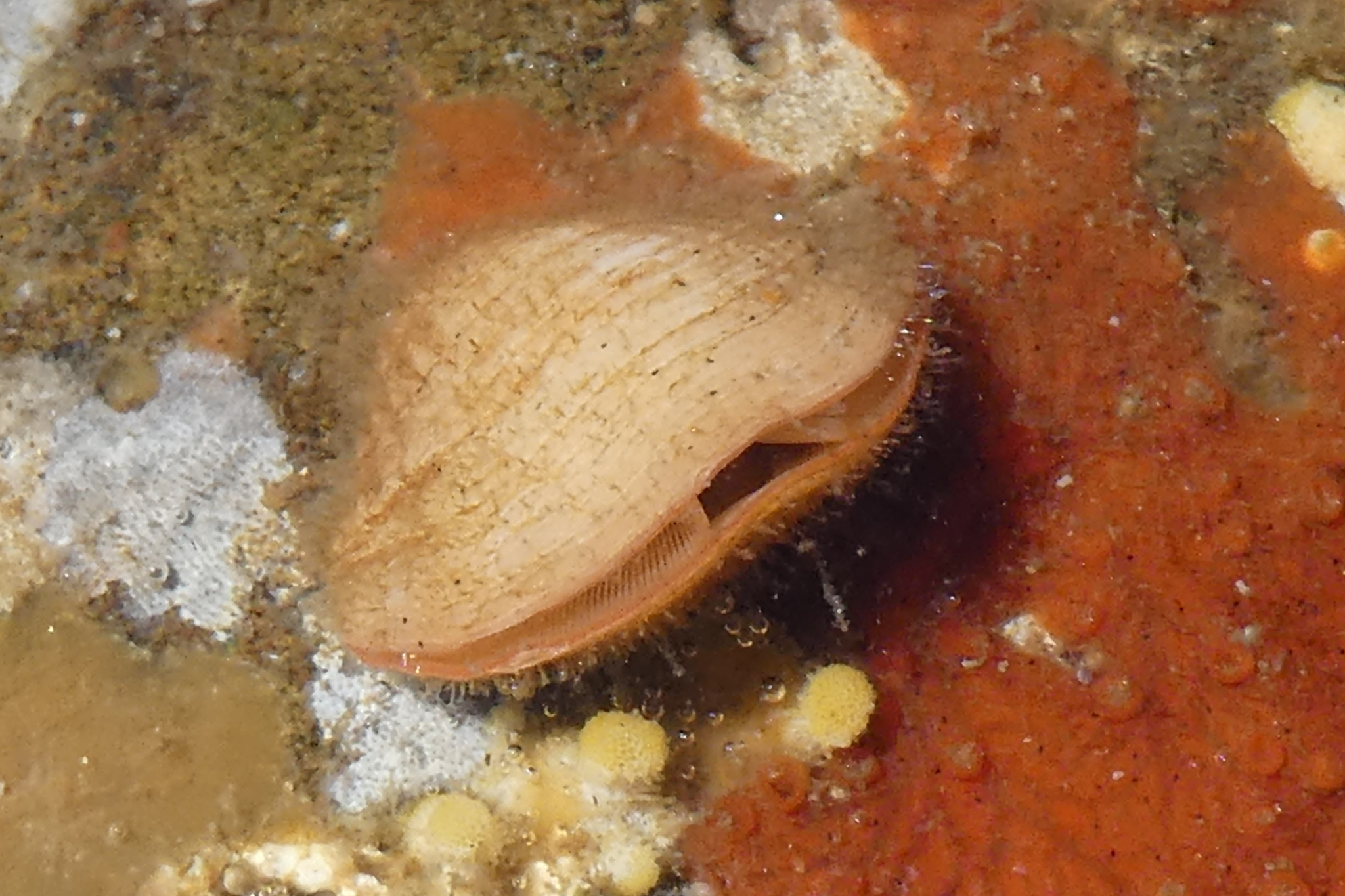
- Terebratalia transversa

Scientific classification
- Kingdom: Animalia
- Phylum: Brachiopoda
- Class: Rhynchonellata
- Order: Terebratulida
- Family: Terebrataliidae
- Genus: Terebratalia; Beecher, 1893

= Terebratalia =

Genus of brachiopods

Terebratalia is a genus of brachiopods belonging to the family Terebrataliidae.

The species of this genus are found in Northern America and Japan.

Species:

- Terebratalia asanoi Nomura & Hatai, 1936
- Terebratalia batequia Sandy et al., 1995
- Terebratalia bialata Nomura & Hatai, 1936
- Terebratalia coreanica (Adams & Reeve, 1850)
- Terebratalia gouldi (Dall, 1891)
- Terebratalia hayasakai Hatai, 1939
- Terebratalia pacifica Hatai, 1936
- Terebratalia radiata Hatai, 1936
- Terebratalia sendaica Hatai, 1936
- Terebratalia tisimana Nomura & Hatai, 1936
- Terebratalia transversa (Sowerby, 1846)
- Terebratalia xanthica (Dall, 1920)
- Terebratula tenuis (Hayasaka, 1922)
