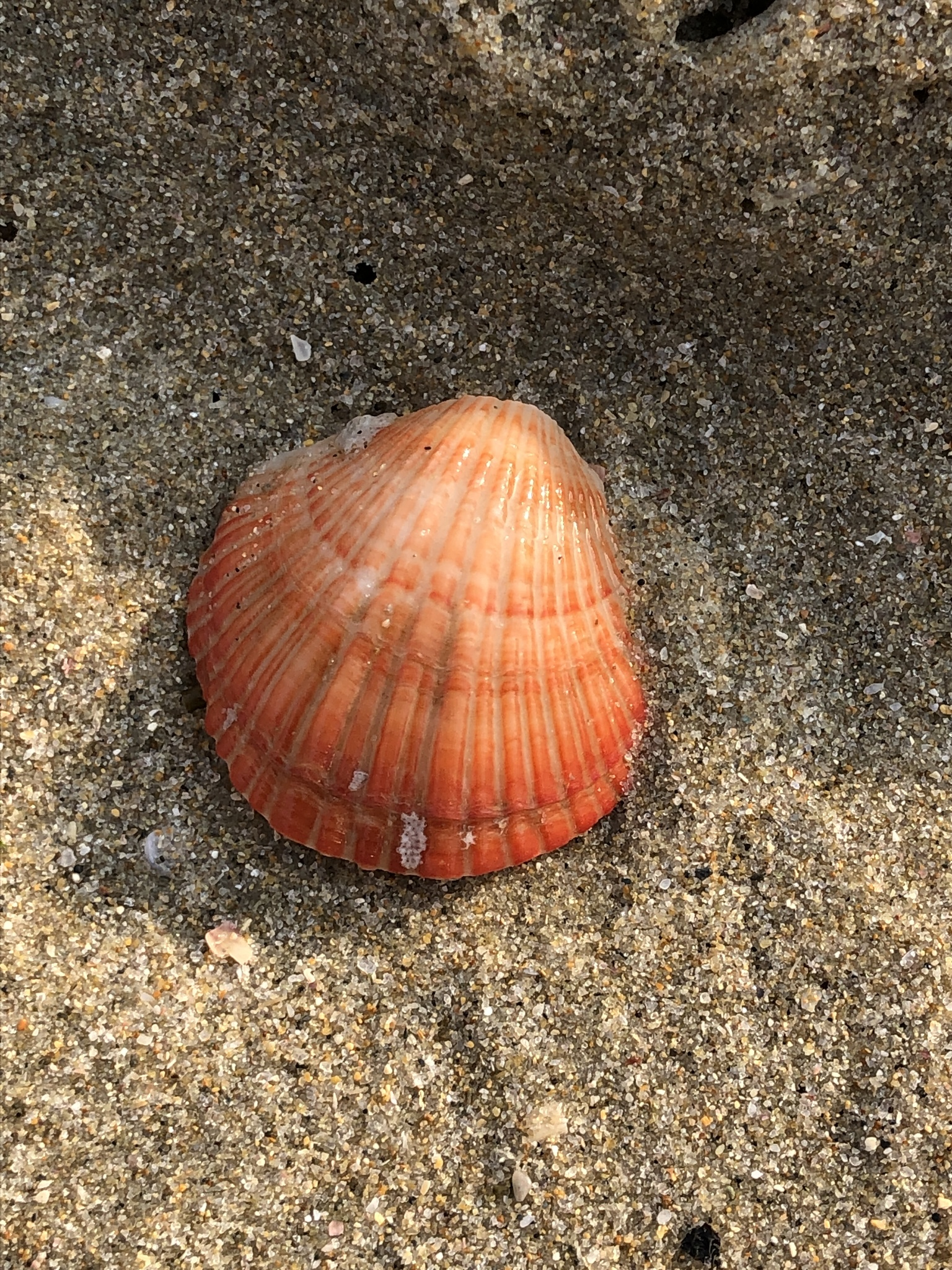

Scientific classification
- Domain: Eukaryota
- Kingdom: Animalia
- Phylum: Brachiopoda
- Class: Rhynchonellata
- Order: Terebratulida
- Family: Terebrataliidae
- Genus: Coptothyris; Jackson, 1918
- Species: C. grayi

Binomial name
- Coptothyris grayi Davidson, 1852)

= Coptothyris =

Genus of brachiopods

Coptothyris is a monotypic genus of brachiopods belonging to the family Terebrataliidae. The only species is Coptothyris grayi.

The species is found in Europe, Northern America, Japan.
