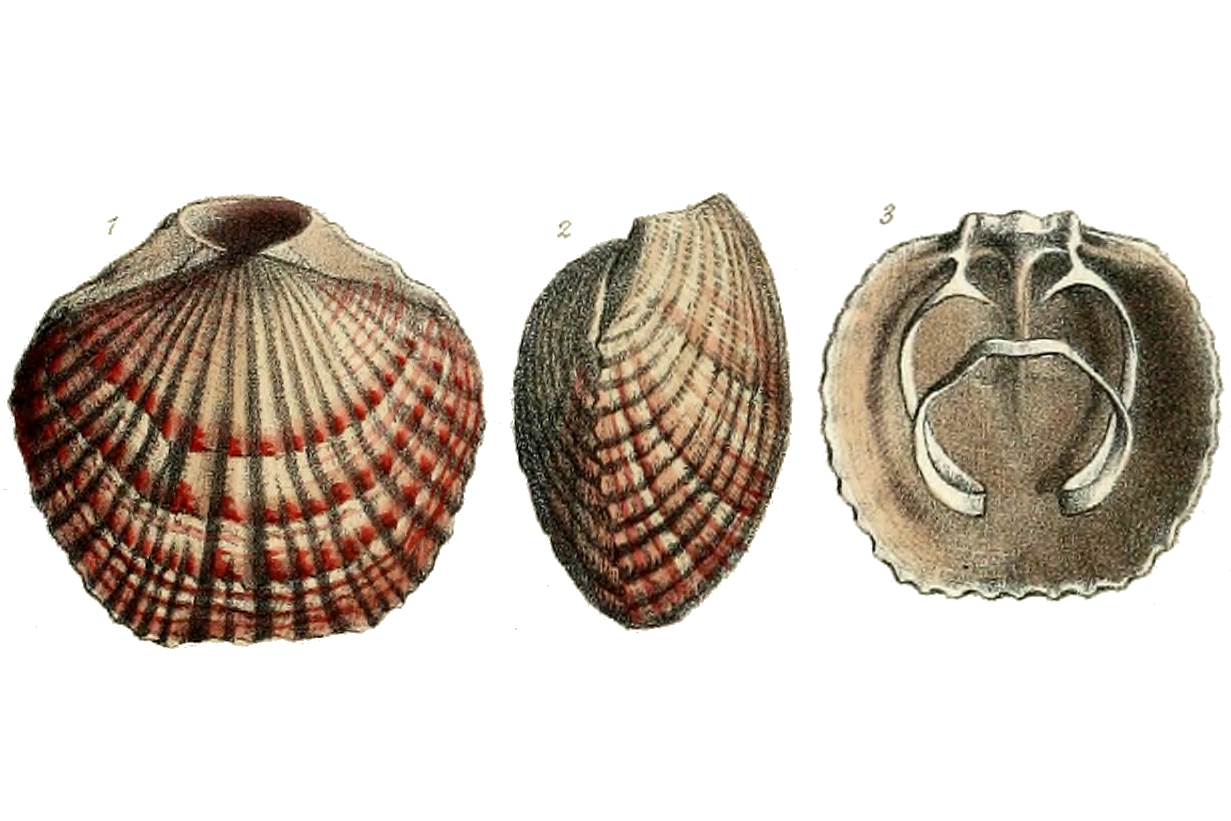
- Coptothyris grayi

Scientific classification
- Kingdom: Animalia
- Phylum: Brachiopoda
- Class: Rhynchonellata
- Order: Terebratulida
- Superfamily: Laqueoidea
- Family: Terebrataliidae; Richardson, 1975

= Terebrataliidae =

Family of brachiopods

Terebrataliidae is a family of brachiopods belonging to the order Terebratulida.

== Genera ==
Genera:

- Arenaciarcula Elliott, 1959
- Coptothyris Jackson, 1918
- Dallinella Thomson, 1915
- Terebratalia
