= Megathyrididae =

Scientific classification
- Kingdom: Animalia
- Phylum: Brachiopoda
- Class: Rhynchonellata
- Order: Terebratulida
- Superfamily: Megathyridoidea
- Family: Megathyrididae

Family of brachiopods

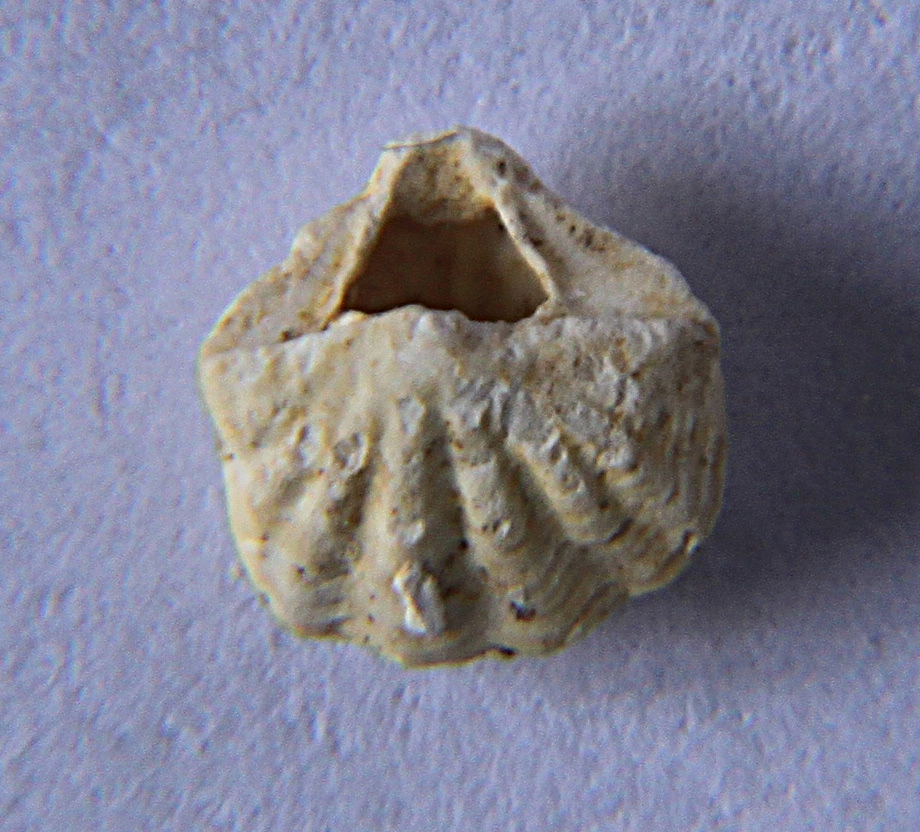

Megathyrididae is a family of brachiopods belonging to the order Terebratulida.

== Genera ==
Genera:

- Argiope Eudes-Deslongchamps, 1842
- Argyrotheca Dall, 1900
- Bronnothyris Popiel-Barczyk & Smirnova, 1978
