= Kafirnigania =

Kafirnigania may refer to:

- Kafirnigania (plant), a genus of plants in the family Apiaceae
- Kafirnigania (brachiopod), a fossil genus of brachiopods in the family Dallinidae
