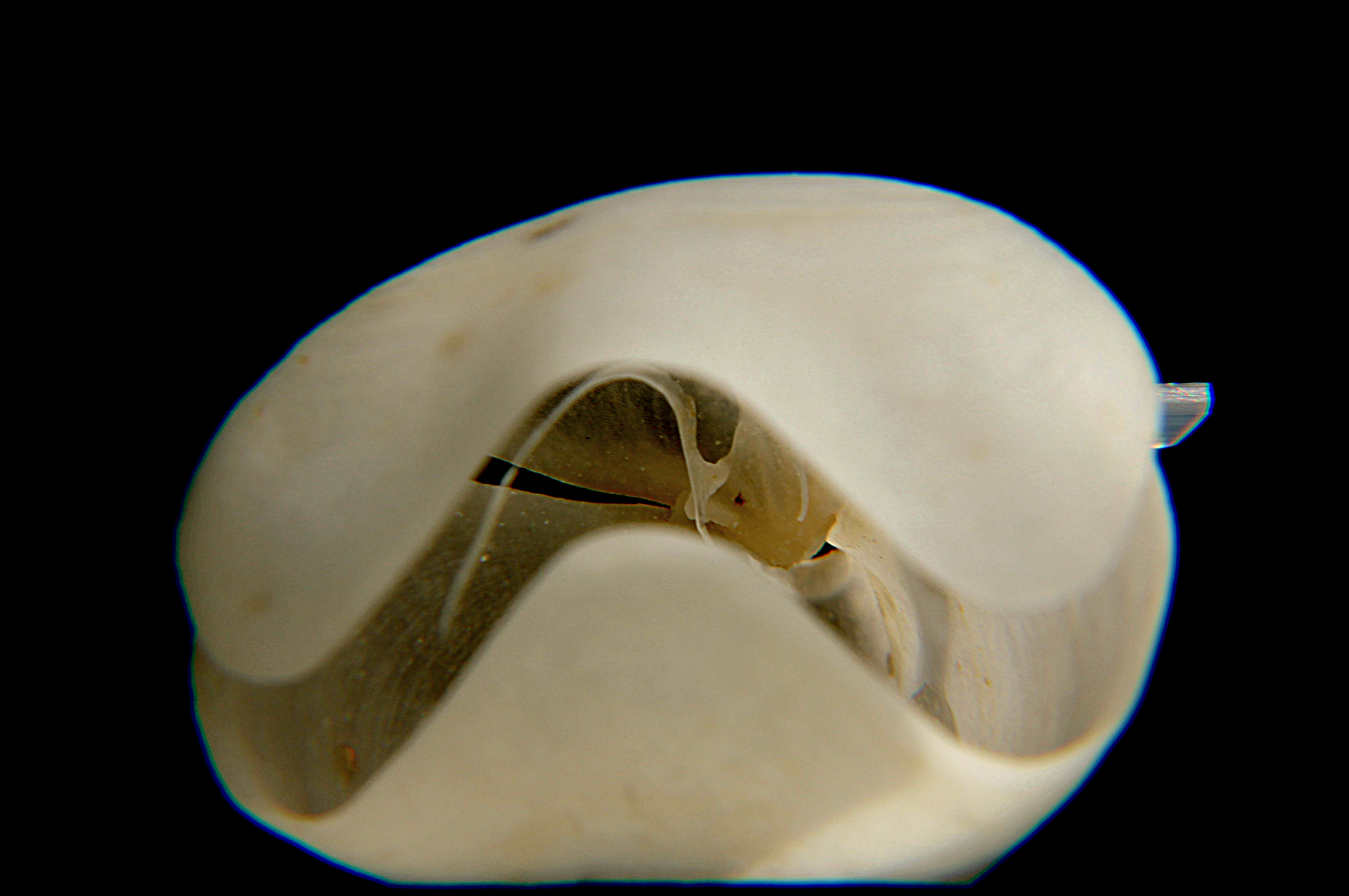
- Dallina septigera, 23mm wide, recent

Scientific classification
- Kingdom: Animalia
- Phylum: Brachiopoda
- Class: Rhynchonellata
- Order: Terebratulida
- Family: Dallinidae
- Subfamily: Dallininae
- Genus: Dallina; Beecher, 1893

Species
- See text

= Dallina =

Dallina Temporal range: Miocene–Recent

Genus of brachiopods

Dallina is a genus of small to average size lampshells (maximum 35 millimetres or 1.4 inches long). It is known since the Miocene.

== Description ==
Small to large, triangular to subquadrangular in outline; rectimarginate to paraplicate; beak erect, without beak ridges; foramen small to large, mesothyrid, attrite, symphytium concave. Hinge teeth small, weak; pedicle collar very short. Cardinalia lamellar with excavate inner and outer hinge plates separated by narrow crural bases; inner hinge plates converging on median septum to form V-shaped septalium; cardinal process not differentiated; median septum low anteriorly, extending beyond midvalve; adult loop teloform.

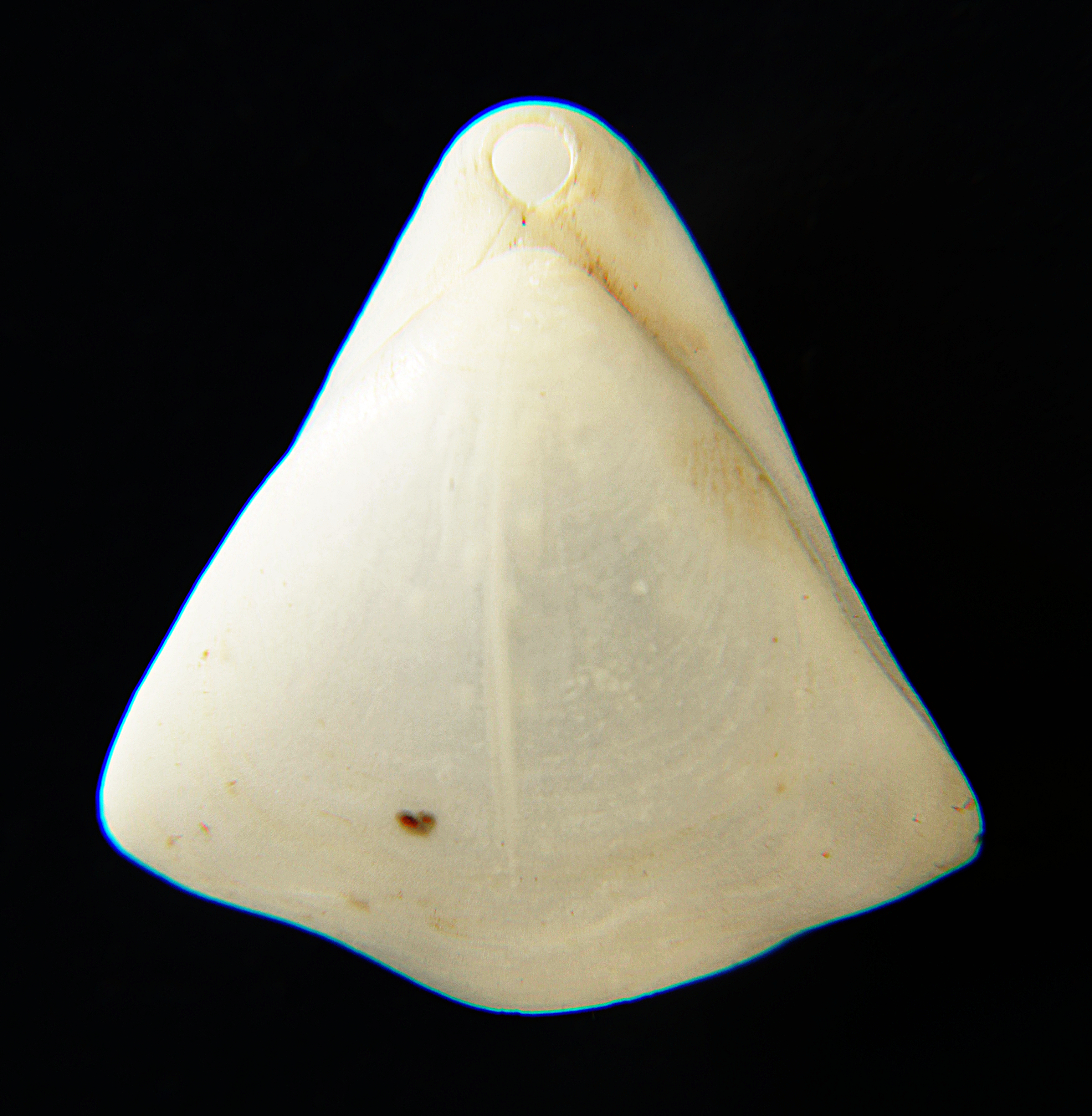
Dallina septigera, brachial valve, 24mm long, near the Philippines

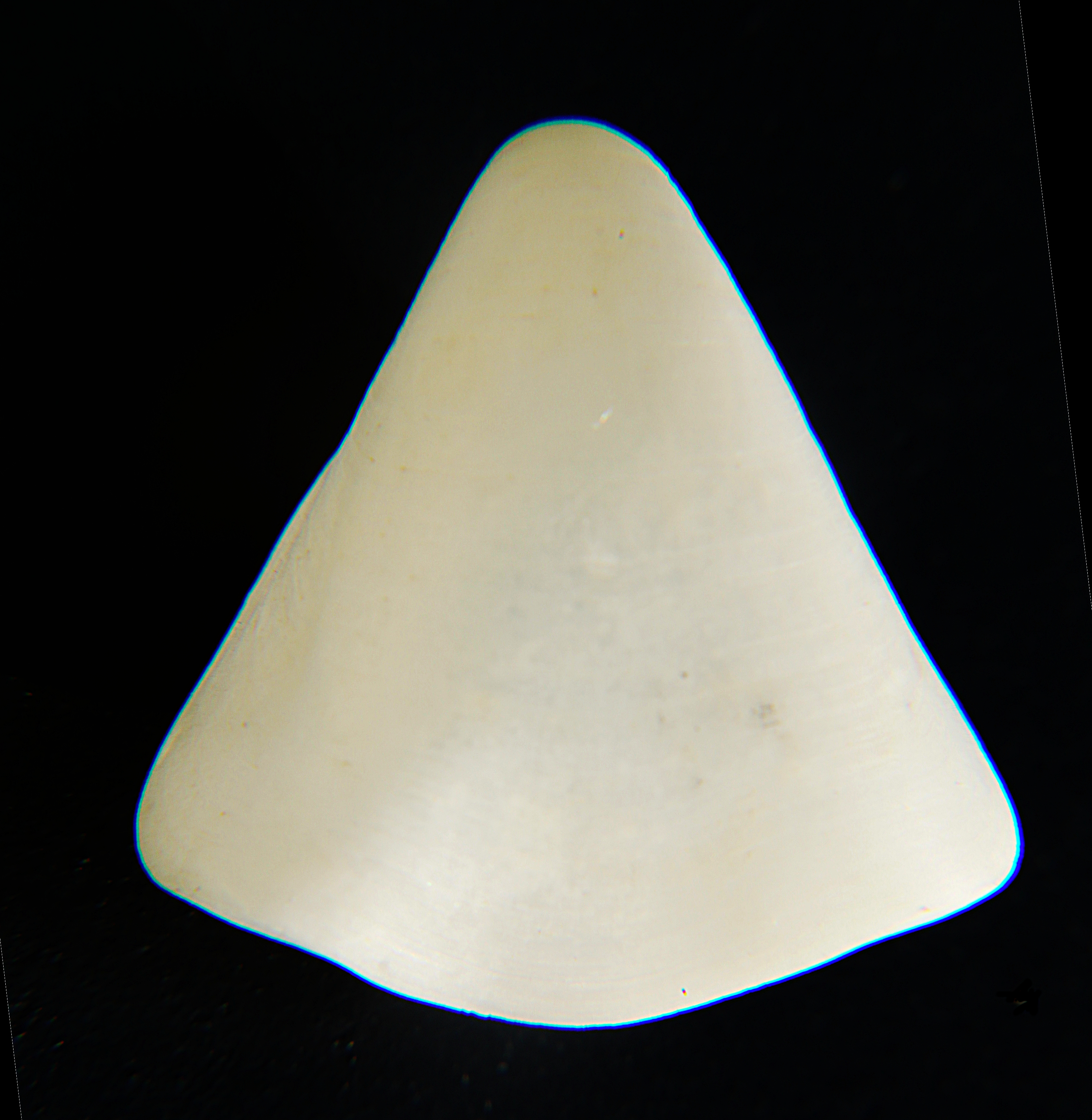
pedicle valve

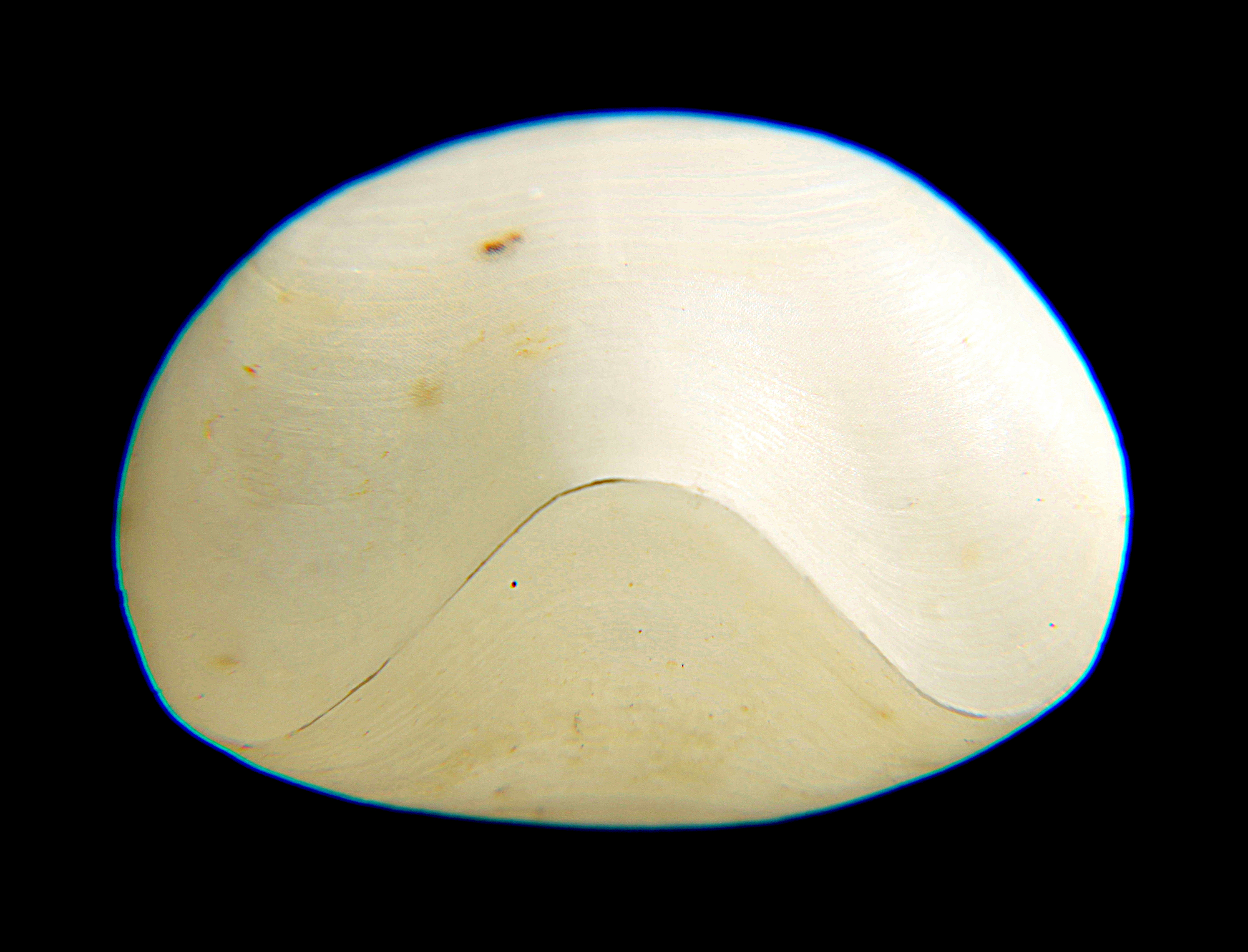
anterior view

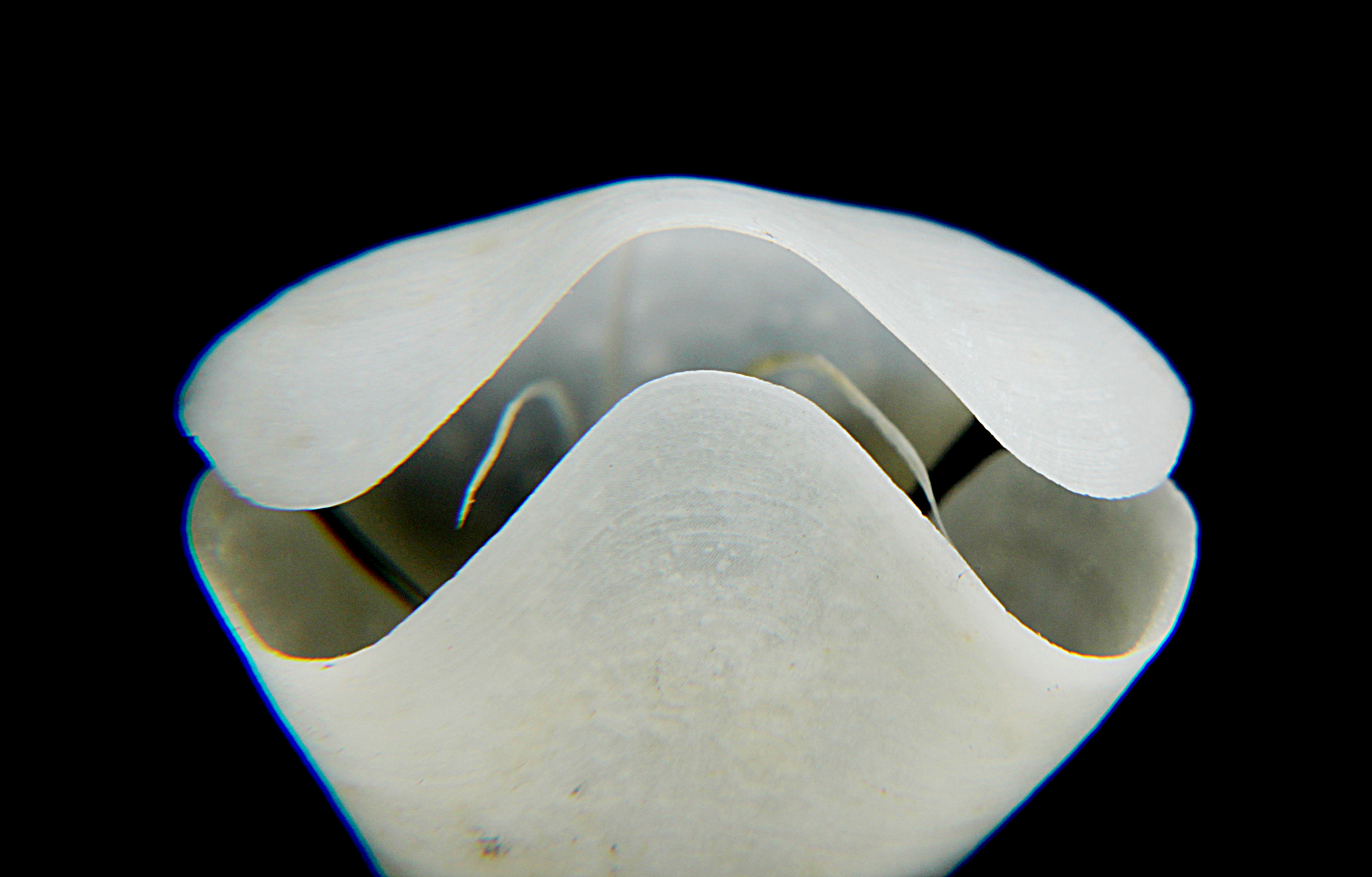
interior view

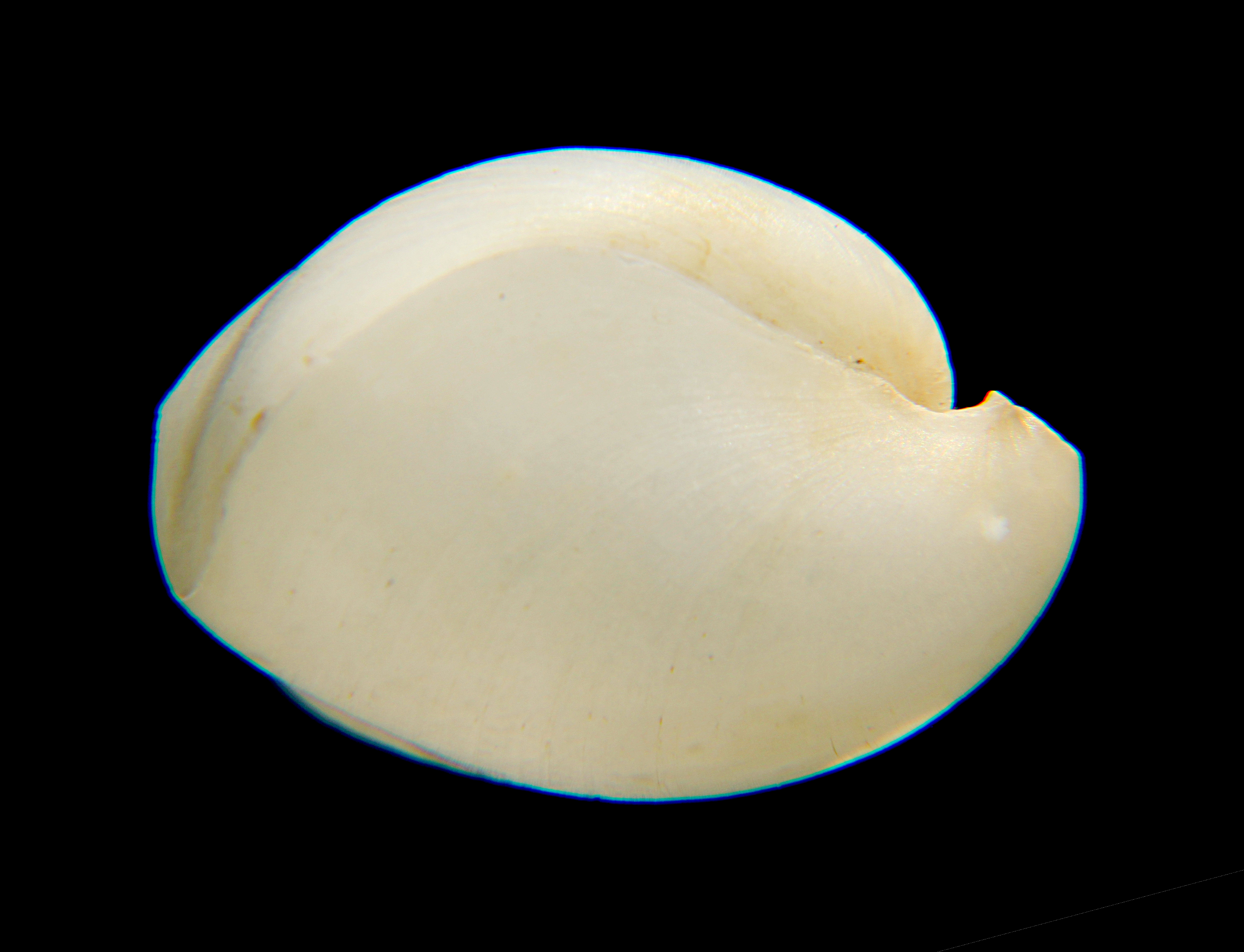
lateral view

== Taxonomy ==
Nine extant species are recognized (though one has recently been synonymized), these are listed below:

- Dallina septigera (Lovén, 1845), Type species of genus, from northeastern Atlantic.
- Dallina elongata Hatai, 1940, recorded from Sea of Japan.
- Dallina eltanini Foster, 1974, southern Pacific, near Antarctica.
- Dallina floridana (Pourtalès, 1867), recorded from the Gulf of Mexico and Bahamas.
- Dallina obessa Yabe & Hatai, 1934, recorded from Sea of Japan.
- Dallina parva Cooper, 1981, recorded from northeast Atlantic (Bay of Biscay).
- Dallina profundis Konjukova, 1957 (junior synonym of Glaciarcula spitzbergensis)
- Dallina raphaelis (Dall, 1970), recorded from off Japan.
- Dallina tasmaniaensis Verhoeff, 2023, southeastern Australia.
- Dallina triangularis Yabe & Hatai, 1934, recorded from off Japan and possibly Lau Ridge.
