= Fallax (brachiopod) =

Scientific classification
- Kingdom: Animalia
- Phylum: Brachiopoda
- Class: Rhynchonellata
- Order: Terebratulida
- Family: Aulacothyropsidae
- Genus: Fallax; Atkins, 1960

Genus of brachiopods

Fallax is a genus of brachiopods belonging to the family Aulacothyropsidae.

The first species of this genus described (F. dalliniformis) occurs in the north-eastern Atlantic. Other members of the genus are recorded from Antarctica (F. antarcticus) and New Caledonia (F. neocaledonensis).

Fallax is diagnosed by having shells that are oval to subpentagonal in shape, with the anterior commissure (line where the valves meet anteriorly) straight or folded (parasulcate). The shell has an erect beak, and conjunct deltidial plates, the foramen being of a 'permesothyrid' type. The hinge teeth are supported by dental plates, and the lophophore support (brachidium) is of a 'dipoloform' type. Fallax species have superficial similarity to some members of Dallinidae, but can be distinguished by the persistence of dental plates.

Species:

- Fallax antarcticus Foster, 1974
- Fallax dalliniformis Atkins, 1960
- Fallax neocaledonensis Laurin, 1997
