= Jaffaia =

Scientific classification
- Domain: Eukaryota
- Kingdom: Animalia
- Phylum: Brachiopoda
- Class: Rhynchonellata
- Order: Terebratulida
- Family: Dallinidae
- Genus: Jaffaia; Thomson, 1927
- Species: J. jaffaensis

Binomial name
- Jaffaia jaffaensis (Blochmann, 1910)

Genus of brachiopods

Jaffaia is a monotypic genus of brachiopods belonging to the family Dallinidae. The only species is Jaffaia jaffaensis from southern Australia. The species was described by Blochmann in 1910 and recently re-described in the Australian Journal of Taxonomy.

== Description ==
J. jaffaensis reaches a maximum length of 23.4 mm and fits the following diagnosis:

Overall outline ovoid to circular, relatively thin laterally and with commissures (junction between the dorsal and ventral shells/valves) straight, anterior commissure rectimarginate to lightly sulcate. Beak (posterior point of shell) suberect, with deltidial plates conjunct (as symphytium) and mostly exposed, and bearing a small foramen. Hinge teeth large relative to symphytium, with swollen bases (not supported by 'dental plates'). Cardinalia with inner and outer hinge plates separated by thick crural bases, inner hinge plates forming a V-shaped septalium supported by median septum. Cardinal process well developed, supported anteriorly by a triangular ridge between the hinge plates, and with a posteriorly facing myophore. The median septum does not reach mid-valve, highest at junction with lateral connecting bands of brachial loop. Crura are short, subparallel, and with short and pointed crural processes. Adult brachial loop 'trabecular', supporting a 'plectolophous' lophophore. (modified and simplified from)

The genus is very similar in morphology to the genus Nipponithyris (sharing a large anteriorly supported cardinal process, thick crural bases, 'trabecular' brachial loop, large and thick based hinge teeth, and rounded shell outline without strong folding) and they may prove synonymous.

== Distribution ==
Jaffaia jaffaensis is recorded from the continental shelf and continental slope around southern, eastern, and western Australia with a bathymetric range of 67 to 550 m depth.
