= Laqueidae =

Scientific classification
- Domain: Eukaryota
- Kingdom: Animalia
- Phylum: Brachiopoda
- Class: Rhynchonellata
- Order: Terebratulida
- Family: Laqueidae

Family of brachiopods

Laqueidae is a family of brachiopods belonging to the order Terebratulida.

== Genera ==
Genera:

- Aldingia Thomson, 1916
- Colinella Owen, 1981
- Dalligas Steinich, 1968
- Eodallina Elliott, 1959
- Eudesia King, 1850
- Glaciarcula Elliott, 1956
- Kamoica Hatai, 1936
- Kikaithyris Yabe & Hatai, 1946
- Kurakithyris Hatai, 1946
- Langshanthyris Sun, 1987
- Laquethiris Bitner, 1996
- Laqueus Dall, 1870
- Lusitanina Andrade, 2006
- Pacifithyris Hatai, 1938
- Parakingena Sun, 1981
- Psilothyris Cooper, 1955
- Rossithyris Owen, 1980
- Tamarella Owen, 1965
- Terebrataliopsis
- Tetrabratalia Beecher, 1893
- Waldheimiathyris Helmcke, 1939
