= Septicollarina =

Scientific classification
- Domain: Eukaryota
- Kingdom: Animalia
- Phylum: Brachiopoda
- Class: Rhynchonellata
- Order: Terebratulida
- Family: Aulacothyropsidae
- Genus: Septicollarina; Zezina, 1981

Genus of brachiopods

Septicollarina is a genus of brachiopods belonging to the family Aulacothyropsidae.

The species of this genus are found in Malesia.

Species:

- Septicollarina hemiechinata Zezina, 1981
- Septicollarina oceanica Zezina, 1990
- Septicollarina zezinae Bitner, 2009
