= Aulacothyropsidae =

Scientific classification
- Domain: Eukaryota
- Kingdom: Animalia
- Phylum: Brachiopoda
- Class: Rhynchonellata
- Order: Terebratulida
- Family: Aulacothyropsidae

Family of brachiopods

Aulacothyropsidae is a family of brachiopods belonging to the order Terebratulida.

Genera:

- Aulacothyropsis Dagys, 1959
- Babukella Dagis, 1974
- Camerothyris Bittner, 1890
- Coriothyris
- Fallax Atkins, 1960
- Hynniphoria Suess, 1859
- Katchathyris
- Ornatothyrella Dagis, 1974
- Septicollarina Zezina, 1981
- Smirnovina Calzada, 1985
- Vandobiella Pozhariskaya, 1966
