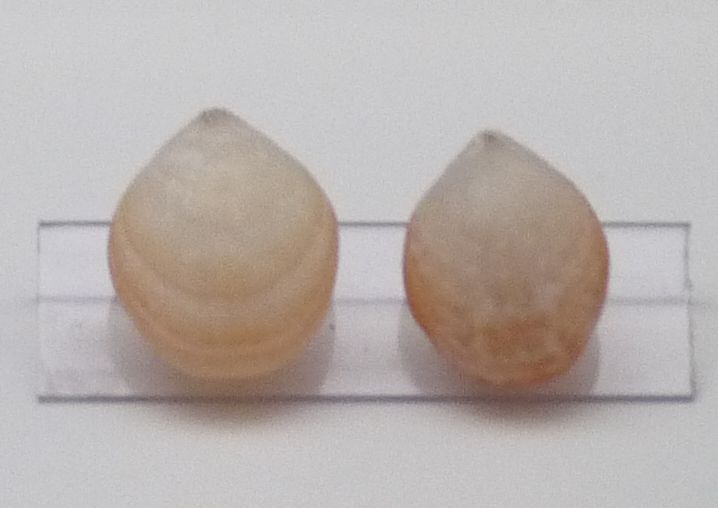
- Laqueus rubellus

Scientific classification
- Kingdom: Animalia
- Phylum: Brachiopoda
- Class: Rhynchonellata
- Order: Terebratulida
- Family: Laqueidae
- Genus: Laqueus; Dall, 1870

= Laqueus =

Genus of brachiopods

Laqueus is a genus of brachiopods belonging to the family Laqueidae.

The species of this genus are found in Japan and North America.

== Species ==
Species:

- Laqueus astartaeformis Hatai, 1940
- Laqueus blanfordi (Dunker, 1882)
- Laqueus cockburnensis Owen, 1980 †
- Laqueus concentricus Yabe & Hatai, 1936
- Laqueus elongatus Cooper, 1957 †
- Laqueus erythraeus Dall, 1920
- Laqueus japonicus Yabe & Hatai, 1934
- Laqueus morsei Dall, 1908
- Laqueus orbicularis Yabe & Hatai, 1934
- Laqueus pacificus Hatai, 1936
- Laqueus pallidus Hatai, 1939
- Laqueus proprius Yabe & Hatai, 1934
- Laqueus quadratus Yabe & Hatai, 1934
- Laqueus rubellus (Sowerby, 1846)
- Laqueus suffusus (Dall, 1870)
- Laqueus vancouveriensis Davidson, 1887
