= Glaciarcula =

Scientific classification
- Domain: Eukaryota
- Kingdom: Animalia
- Phylum: Brachiopoda
- Class: Rhynchonellata
- Order: Terebratulida
- Family: Laqueidae
- Genus: Glaciarcula; Elliott, 1956

Genus of brachiopods

Glaciarcula is a genus of brachiopods belonging to the family Laqueidae.

The species of this genus are found in Northern Europe.

Species:

- Glaciarcula friellei (Davidson, 1878)
- Glaciarcula spitzbergensis (Davidson, 1852)
