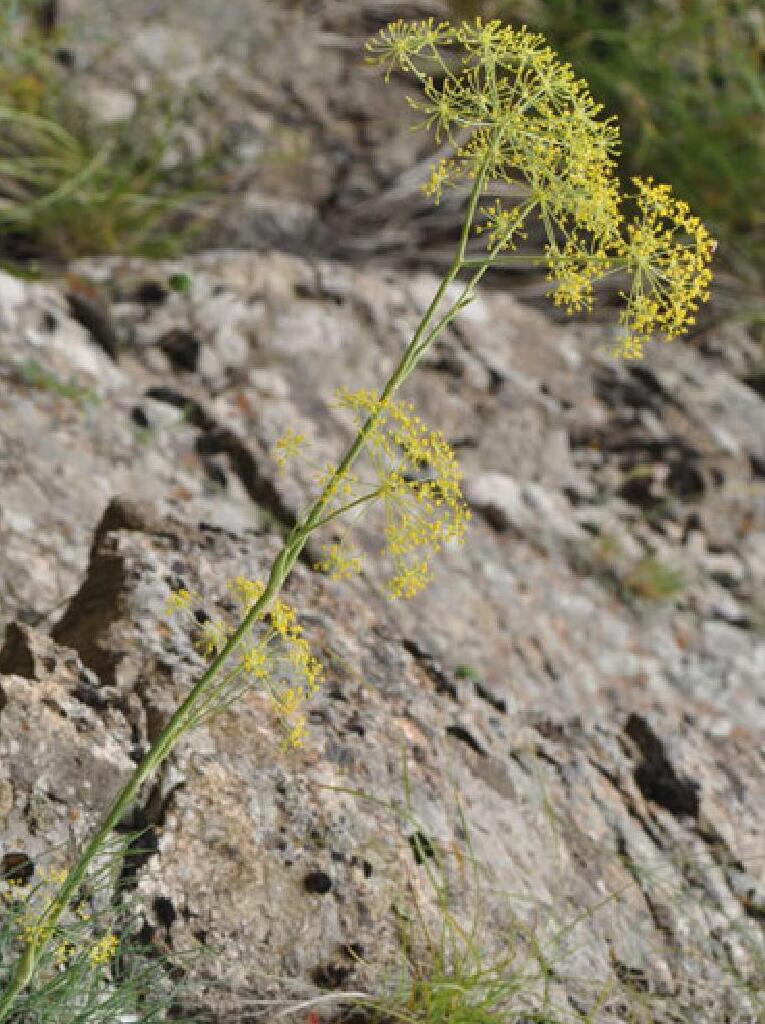

Scientific classification
- Kingdom: Plantae
- Clade: Tracheophytes
- Clade: Angiosperms
- Clade: Eudicots
- Clade: Asterids
- Order: Apiales
- Family: Apiaceae
- Subfamily: Apioideae
- Tribe: Scandiceae
- Subtribe: Ferulinae
- Genus: Kafirnigania; Kamelin & Kinzik.
- Species: K. hissarica

Binomial name
- Kafirnigania hissarica (Korovin) Kamelin & Kinzik.

Synonyms
- Species synonymy: Peucedanum hissaricum Korovin

= Kafirnigania hissarica =

Species of flowering plant

Kafirnigania is a genus of flowering plants belonging to the family Apiaceae. It has only one species, Kafirnigania hissarica. Its native range is Central Asia.
