= Nipponithyris =

Scientific classification
- Domain: Eukaryota
- Kingdom: Animalia
- Phylum: Brachiopoda
- Class: Rhynchonellata
- Order: Terebratulida
- Family: Dallinidae
- Genus: Nipponithyris; Yabe & Hatai, 1934

Genus of brachiopods

Nipponithyris is a genus of brachiopods belonging to the family Dallinidae.

The species of this genus are found in New Zealand.

Species:

- Nipponithyris afra Cooper, 1973
- Nipponithyris lauensis Bitner, 2008
- Nipponithyris nipponensis Yabe & Hatai, 1934
- Nipponithyris notoensis Hatai, 1940
- Nipponithyris subovata (Hatai, 1936)
- Nipponithyris yabei Hatai, 1939
