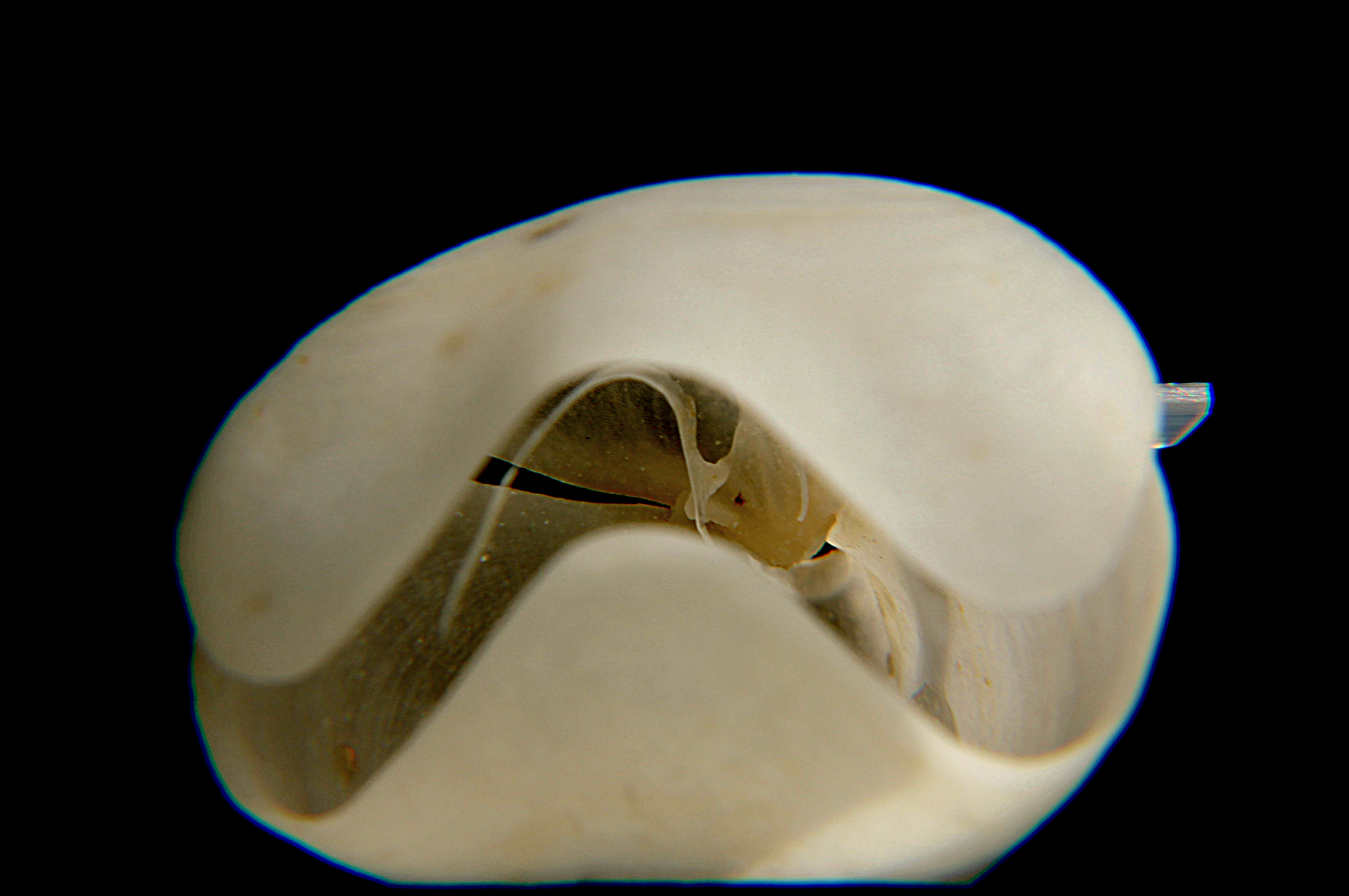
- Dallina septiger

Scientific classification
- Kingdom: Animalia
- Phylum: Brachiopoda
- Class: Rhynchonellata
- Order: Terebratulida
- Superfamily: Terebratelloidea
- Family: Dallinidae; Beecher, 1893

= Dallinidae =

Family of brachiopods

Dallinidae is a family of loopbearing brachiopods belonging to the order Terebratulida.

It is bilaterally symmetrical with a calcite tissue structure. It utilizes a feeding current for obtaining food and reproduces sexually. Occurrences have been observed around the globe, especially in Norway and Tasmania.

== Genera ==
Genera:

- †Antigoniarcula Elliott, 1959
- Campages Hedley, 1905
- Dallina Beecher, 1893
- Jaffaia Thomson, 1927
- Nipponithyris Yabe & Hatai, 1934
