= Pictothyris =

Scientific classification
- Domain: Eukaryota
- Kingdom: Animalia
- Phylum: Brachiopoda
- Class: Rhynchonellata
- Order: Terebratulida
- Family: Frenulinidae
- Genus: Pictothyris; Thomson, 1927

Genus of brachiopods

Pictothyris is a genus of brachiopods belonging to the family Frenulinidae.

The species of this genus are found in Japan.

Species:

- Pictothyris elegans Yabe & Hatai, 1936
- Pictothyris laquaeformis Yabe & Hatai, 1936
- Pictothyris picta (Dallwyn, 1817)
- Pictothyris tanegashimaensis Hayasaka, 1973
