= Jolonica =

Scientific classification
- Domain: Eukaryota
- Kingdom: Animalia
- Phylum: Brachiopoda
- Class: Rhynchonellata
- Order: Terebratulida
- Family: Frenulinidae
- Genus: Jolonica; Dall, 1920

Genus of brachiopods

Jolonica is a genus of brachiopods belonging to the family Frenulinidae.

The species of this genus are found in Southern Africa and Australia.

Species:

- Jolonica alcocki (Joubin, 1906)
- Jolonica elliptica Cooper, 1957
- Jolonica hedleyi Dall, 1920
- Jolonica iduensis Hatai, 1936
- Jolonica macneili Cooper, 1957
- Jolonica nipponica Yabe & Hatai, 1934
- Jolonica ryukyuensis Yabe & Hatai, 1935
- Jolonica suffusa (Cooper, 1973)
