= Shimodaia =

Scientific classification
- Domain: Eukaryota
- Kingdom: Animalia
- Phylum: Brachiopoda
- Class: Rhynchonellata
- Order: Terebratulida
- Family: Frenulinidae
- Genus: Shimodaia; MacKinnon, Saito & Endo, 1997

Genus of brachiopods

Shimodaia is a genus of brachiopods belonging to the family Frenulinidae.

The species of this genus are found in Japan.

Species:

- Shimodaia macclesfieldensis MacKinnon & Long, 2009
- Shimodaia pterygiota MacKinnon, Saito & Endo, 1997
