= Frenulinidae =

Scientific classification
- Domain: Eukaryota
- Kingdom: Animalia
- Phylum: Brachiopoda
- Class: Rhynchonellata
- Order: Terebratulida
- Family: Frenulinidae

Family of brachiopods

Frenulinidae is a family of brachiopods belonging to the order Terebratulida.

Genera:

- Compsoria Cooper, 1973
- Frenulina Dall, 1895
- Jolonica Dall, 1920
- Pictothyris Thomson, 1927
- Shimodaia MacKinnon, Saito & Endo, 1997
