= 2012 in paleontology =

Paleontology or palaeontology is the study of prehistoric life forms on Earth through the examination of plant and animal fossils. This includes the study of body fossils, tracks (ichnites), burrows, cast-off parts, fossilised feces (coprolites), palynomorphs and chemical residues. Because humans have encountered fossils for millennia, paleontology has a long history both before and after becoming formalized as a science. This article records significant discoveries and events related to paleontology that occurred or were published in the year 2012.

Note: In 2012, the International Code of Zoological Nomenclature was amended, with new regulations allowing the publication of new names and nomenclatural acts in zoology after 2011, in works "produced in an edition containing simultaneously obtainable copies by a method that assures [...] widely accessible electronic copies with fixed content and layout", provided that the work is registered in ZooBank before it is published, the work itself states the date of publication with evidence that registration has occurred, and the ZooBank registration states both the name of an electronic archive intended to preserve the work and the ISSN or ISBN associated with the work. New scientific names appearing in electronic works are not required to be registered in ZooBank, only the works themselves are. Works containing descriptions of some of the taxa listed below were not printed on paper in 2012; however, the taxa that were described in works which were registered in ZooBank in 2012 are listed as valid.

== Arthropods ==
The following is a summary of the arthropods described in 2012

- 41 arachnids
- 105 crustaceans
- 362 insects
- 5 merostomatans
- 51 trilobites
- 9 other arthropods

== Bryozoans ==
Name	Novelty	Status	Authors	Age	Unit	Location	Notes	Images
Acupipora	Gen. et comb. nov	Valid	Gorjunova & Weiss	Late Carboniferous		Russia	A member of Fenestellida. The type species is "Polypora" subborealis Schulga-Nesterenko (1951).	
Admirandopora	Nom. nov.	Valid	Ariunchimeg	Lower Carboniferous		Mongolia	A replacement name for the genus Admiranda Ariunchimeg, 1996.	
Antoniettella	Gen. et sp. nov	Valid	Di Martino & Taylor	Early or middle Miocene		Indonesia	A cribrimorph ascophoran. The type species is Antoniettella exigua.	
Argentinodictya	Gen. et sp. nov	Valid	Ernst & Carrera	Late Ordovician (Sandbian)		Argentina	A cryptostome bryozoan, a member of Ptilodictyina. The type species is Argentinodictya lenticulata.	
Bigeyina ibera	Sp. nov.	Valid	Ernst	Devonian		Spain	A member of Fenestrata.	
Celleporina medoborensis	Sp. nov	Valid	Hara & Jasionowski	Miocene (early Sarmatian)		Ukraine	A celleporid cheilostome bryozoan, a species of Celleporina.	
Chasmatopora rossae	Sp. nov	Valid	Ernst & Carrera	Late Ordovician (Sandbian)		Argentina	A phyloporinine, a species of Chasmatopora.	
Dissotrypa punctata	Sp. nov.	Valid	Ernst	Devonian		Spain	A member of Fenestrata.	
Dissotrypa robusta	Sp. nov.	Valid	Ernst	Devonian		Spain	A member of Fenestrata.	
Eosemicoscinium serratum	Sp. nov.	Valid	Ernst	Devonian		Spain	A member of Fenestrata.	
Hemitrypa cantabrica	Sp. nov.	Valid	Ernst	Devonian		Spain	A member of Fenestrata.	
Iberofenestella	Gen. et sp. nov.	Valid	Ernst	Devonian		Spain	A member of Fenestrata. Genus includes new species I. wolfae.	
Lunostoma	Gen. et sp. nov	Valid	Ernst, Taylor, Bohatý & Wyse Jackson	Middle Devonian		Germany	A cryptostome bryozoan. The type species is Lunostoma pulchra.	
Parvohallopora parvula	Sp. nov	Valid	Ernst & Carrera	Late Ordovician (Sandbian)		Argentina	A trepostome bryozoan, a species of Parvohallopora.	
Paucipora akishinensis	Sp. nov	Valid	Gorjunova & Weiss	Late Carboniferous (Moscovian)	Domodedovo Formation	Russia	A member of Fenestellida.	
Prolixicella ibera	Sp. nov.	Valid	Ernst	Devonian		Spain	A member of Fenestrata.	
Prolixicella parva	Sp. nov.	Valid	Ernst	Devonian		Spain	A member of Fenestrata.	
Ptilodictya intermedia	Sp. nov	Valid	Ernst & Carrera	Late Ordovician (Sandbian)		Argentina	A cryptostome bryozoan, a species of Ptilodictya.	
Pyrisinella	Gen. et comb. nov	Valid	Di Martino & Taylor	Late Cretaceous (Maastrichtian)	Peedee Formation; Prairie Bluff Chalk; Ripley Formation	United States	A member of Cheilostomata belonging to the family Pyrisinellidae. The type species is "Setosinella" meniscacantha Taylor & McKinney (2006).	
Rectifenestella elegantula	Sp. nov.	Valid	Ernst	Devonian		Spain	A member of Fenestrata.	
Rectifenestella villayandrensis	Sp. nov.	Valid	Ernst	Devonian		Spain	A member of Fenestrata.	
Rorypora	Gen. et comb. nov.	Valid	Taylor	Jurassic		Switzerland	A new genus for "Diastopora" retiformis.	
Setosinella perfluxa	Sp. nov	Valid	Di Martino & Taylor	Miocene (Langhian)		Indonesia	A member of Cheilostomata belonging to the family Pyrisinellidae.	
Spinisinella	Gen. et sp. nov	Valid	Di Martino & Taylor	Late Cretaceous (Cenomanian)		Czech Republic; Germany	A member of Cheilostomata belonging to the family Pyrisinellidae. The type species is S. zagorseki.	
Trigonodictya parvula	Sp. nov	Valid	Ernst & Carrera	Late Ordovician (Sandbian)		Argentina	A cryptostome bryozoan, a species of Trigonodictya.	

== Brachiopods ==
Name	Novelty	Status	Authors	Age	Unit	Location	Notes	Images
Amydroptychus markowitzi	sp nov	Valid	Feldman et al.	Callovian	Mughanniyya Formation	Jordan	A tetrarhynchiid rhynchonellide, a species of Amydroptychus.	
Anisopleurella tricostata	Sp. nov	Valid	Rasmussen, Harper & Blodgett	Late Ordovician	Farewell Terrane	United States	A member of Strophomenida belonging to the group Plectambonitoidea and the family Sowerbyellidae.	
Bolilaspirifer riccardii	Sp. nov	Valid	Manceñido in Damborenea & Manceñido	Late Triassic		Argentina	A lepismatinid brachiopod, a species of Bolilaspirifer.	
Burrirhynchia angustisinuata	sp nov	Valid	Smirnova	Early Cretaceous		Russia	A cyclothyridid rhynchonellide, a species of Burrirhynchia.	
Burrirhynchia latimarginata	sp nov	Valid	Smirnova	Early Cretaceous		Russia	A cyclothyridid rhynchonellide, a species of Burrirhynchia.	
Burrirhynchia oweni	sp nov	Valid	Smirnova	Early Cretaceous		Russia	A cyclothyridid rhynchonellide, a species of Burrirhynchia.	
Burrirhynchia subgrasiana	sp nov	Valid	Smirnova	Early Cretaceous		Russia	A cyclothyridid rhynchonellide, a species of Burrirhynchia.	
Callositella	Gen. et sp. nov	Valid	Rasmussen, Harper & Blodgett	Late Ordovician	Farewell Terrane	United States	A member of Orthida belonging to the group Enteletoidea and the family Saukrodictyidae. The type species is C. cheeneetnukensis.	
Christiania aseptata	Sp. nov	Valid	Rasmussen, Harper & Blodgett	Late Ordovician	Farewell Terrane	United States	A member of Strophomenida belonging to the family Christianiidae.	
Cincinnetina	Gen, sp. et comb. nov	Valid	Jin	Late Ordovician		United States	A dalmanellid brachiopod, with C. multisecta, C. meeki, C. minnesotensis	
Craspedelia potterella	Sp. nov	Valid	Rasmussen, Harper & Blodgett	Late Ordovician	Farewell Terrane	United States	A member of Strophomenida belonging to the group Plectambonitoidea and the family Bimuriidae.	
Crurithyris tazawai	sp nov	Valid	He et al..	Late Permian (Changhsingian)		China	An ambocoeliid brachiopod, a species of Crurithyris.	
Cyclothyris aliformis	sp nov	Valid	Smirnova	Early Cretaceous		Russia	A cyclothyridid rhynchonellide, a species of Burrirhynchia.	
Cyclothyris alikentica	sp nov	Valid	Smirnova	Early Cretaceous		Russia	A cyclothyridid rhynchonellide, a species of Burrirhynchia.	
Cyclothyris burgemakensis	sp nov	Valid	Smirnova	Early Cretaceous		Russia	A cyclothyridid rhynchonellide, a species of Burrirhynchia.	
Cyclothyris dagestanica	sp nov	Valid	Smirnova	Early Cretaceous		Russia	A cyclothyridid rhynchonellide, a species of Burrirhynchia.	
Cyclothyris tenuicostata	sp nov	Valid	Smirnova	Early Cretaceous		Russia	A cyclothyridid rhynchonellide, a species of Burrirhynchia.	
Cyclothyris zudakharica	sp nov	Valid	Smirnova	Early Cretaceous		Russia	A cyclothyridid rhynchonellide, a species of Burrirhynchia.	
Daghanirhynchia susanae	Species	Valid	Feldman et al.	Callovian	Mughanniyya Formation	Jordan	A tetrarhynchiid rhynchonellide, a species of Daghanirhynchia.	
Duolobella	Gen. et sp. nov	Valid	Rasmussen, Harper & Blodgett	Late Ordovician	Farewell Terrane	United States	A member of Orthida belonging to the group Orthoidea and the family Orthidae. The type species is D. sandiae.	
Eodmitria anauris	sp nov	Valid	Oleneva	Late Devonian (middle Frasnian)		Russia	A cyrtospiriferid spiriferid, a species of Eodmitria.	
Gatosella	Gen. et sp. nov	Valid	Benedetto	Middle Ordovician (early Darriwilian)	San Juan Formation	Argentina	A plectambonitoid brachiopod. The type species is Gatosella muricata.	
Gelidorthis perisiberiaensis	Sp. nov	Valid	Rasmussen, Harper & Blodgett	Late Ordovician	Farewell Terrane	United States	A member of Orthida belonging to the group Plectorthoidea and the family Plectorthidae.	
Gracianella (Sublepida) paulula	sp nov	Valid	Baliński	Early Devonian	Khudykivtsi Beds	Ukraine	An atrypinid brachiopod, a species of Gracianella.	
Kentronetes giae	Sp. nov	Valid	Racheboeuf in Racheboeuf et al.	Devonian (Lochkovian)	Uncía Formation	Bolivia	A chonetoid brachiopod belonging to the family Strophochonetidae.	
Kuangshanotreta	Gen. et sp. nov	Valid	Wang et al.	Early Cambrian	Heilinpu Formation	China	An acrotretoid, a member of Lingulata. The type species is Kuangshanotreta malungensis.	
Kudrjavzevina	Gen. et 3 sp. nov	Valid	Smirnova	Early Cretaceous		Russia	A cyclothyridid rhynchonellide. Genus contains 3 species: K. ulluchaensis, K. regularis and K. fragilis.	
Lamellaerhynchia latiovalis	Sp. nov	Valid	Smirnova	Early Cretaceous		Russia	A praecyclothyridid rhynchonellide, a species of Lamellaerhynchia.	
Leptaena (Septomena) alaskensis	Sp. nov	Valid	Rasmussen, Harper & Blodgett	Late Ordovician	Farewell Terrane	United States	A member of Strophomenida belonging to the family Rafinesquinidae.	
Lobachevina	Gen. et 2 sp. nov	Valid	Smirnova	Early Cretaceous		Russia	A cyclothyridid rhynchonellide. Genus contains 2 new species: L. angusteinis and L. vagus.	
Lynnica	Gen. et sp. nov	Valid	Madison	Ordovician		Russia	A member of Strophomenida. The type species is Lynnica fragilis.	
Merglia	Gen. et comb. nov	Valid	Franke	Devonian		Germany; Luxembourg	A member of the family Craniidae. The type species is "Philhedra" schwerdi Drevermann (1902).	
Orthothrix sudoi	Sp. nov	Valid	Tazawa	Permian (Changhsingian)	Toyoma Formation	Japan	A member of Productida belonging to the suborder Strophalosiidina and the family Strophalosiidae.	
Oanduporella kuskokwimensis	Sp. nov	Valid	Rasmussen, Harper & Blodgett	Late Ordovician	Farewell Terrane	United States	A member of Orthida belonging to the group Enteletoidea and the family Draboviidae.	
Palaeowingella	Gen. et sp. nov	Valid	Rasmussen, Harper & Blodgett	Late Ordovician	Farewell Terrane	United States	A member of Orthida belonging to the group Orthoidea and the family Orthidae. The type species is P. farewellensis.	
Petrocrania fabisziskyi	Sp. nov	Valid	Franke	Devonian		Germany; Luxembourg	A member of the family Craniidae.	
Petrocrania krautscheidensis	Sp. nov	Valid	Franke	Devonian		Germany; Luxembourg	A member of the family Craniidae.	
Plectodonta mariae pantherae	Subsp nov	Valid	Baliński	Early Devonian	Khudykivtsi Beds	Ukraine	A sowerbyellid brachiopod, a subspecies of Plectodonta mariae.	
Ptychoglyptus alaensis	Sp. nov	Valid	Rasmussen, Harper & Blodgett	Late Ordovician	Farewell Terrane	United States	A member of Strophomenida belonging to the group Plectambonitoidea and the family Sowerbyellidae.	
Rotutaspirifer	Gen. et sp. nov	Valid	Oleneva	Late Devonian (middle Frasnian)		Russia	A cyrtospiriferid spiriferid. The type species is Rotutaspirifer rotutus.	
Sanjuanetes glemareci	Sp. nov	Valid	Racheboeuf in Racheboeuf et al.	Silurian (Přídolí)	Muruhuta Shale Member	Bolivia	A chonetoid brachiopod belonging to the family Strophochonetidae.	
Sharovaella	Gen. et sp. nov	Valid	Pakhnevich	Late Devonian (Famennian)		Russia	A punctate rhynchonellide brachiopod. The type species is Sharovaella mirabilis.	
Skenidioides tatyanae	sp nov	Valid	Baliński	Early Devonian	Khudykivtsi Beds	Ukraine	A skenidiid brachiopod, a species of Skenidioides.	
Sowerbyella (Rugosowerbyella) praecursor	Sp. nov	Valid	Rasmussen, Harper & Blodgett	Late Ordovician	Farewell Terrane	United States	A member of Strophomenida belonging to the group Plectambonitoidea and the family Sowerbyellidae.	
Sowerbyella (Sowerbyella) rectangularis	Sp. nov	Valid	Rasmussen, Harper & Blodgett	Late Ordovician	Farewell Terrane	United States	A member of Strophomenida belonging to the group Plectambonitoidea and the family Sowerbyellidae.	
Strophatrypa	Gen. et sp. nov	Valid	Boucot, Blodgett & Rohr	Late Silurian		United States	A member of Atrypida belonging to the family Atrypidae. The type species is S. skaflestadi.	
Sulcirhynchia insolitus	Sp. nov	Valid	Smirnova	Early Cretaceous		Russia	A praecyclothyridid rhynchonellide, a species of Sulcirhynchia.	
Terrakea nabekoshiyamensis	Sp. nov	Valid	Tazawa	Permian (Changhsingian)	Toyoma Formation	Japan	A member of Productida belonging to the suborder Productidina and the family Linoproductidae.	
Transridgeia	Gen. et sp. nov	Valid	Rasmussen, Harper & Blodgett	Ordovician (late Darriwilian–early Sandbian)	Farewell Terrane	United States	A member of Strophomenida belonging to the family Strophomenidae. The type species is T. costata.	

== Molluscs ==
The following is a summary of the Molluscs described in 2012

- 54 ammonites
- 14 other cephalopods
- 52 gastropods
- 15 other molluscs

== Echinoderms ==
Name	Novelty	Status	Authors	Age	Unit	Location	Notes	Images
Anatifopsis fillmorensis	Sp. nov	Valid	Sumrall et al.	Early Ordovician		United States	A mitrate, a species of Anatifopsis.	
Anatifopsis ninemilensis	Sp. nov	Valid	Sumrall et al.	Early Ordovician	McKelligon Canyon Formation; Ninemile Shale	United States	A mitrate, a species of Anatifopsis.	
Andymetra	Gen. et sp. nov	Valid	Hess	Early Bathonian		France	A comatulid crinoid. The type species is Andymetra galei.	
Aorocrinus meyeri	Sp. nov	Valid	Ausich & Roeser	Late Kinderhookian	Cuyahoga Formation	United States	A camerate crinoid, a species of Aorocrinus.	
Aphelecrinus gracilis	Sp. nov	Valid	Kammer & Roeser	Kinderhookian	Cuyahoga Formation	United States	A cladid crinoid, a species of Aphelecrinus.	
Apiocrinites negevensis	Sp. nov	Valid	Ausich & Wilson	Middle Jurassic (Callovian)	Matmor Formation	Israel	An apiocrinitid crinoid, a species of Apiocrinites.	
Aryballocrinus martini	Sp. nov	Valid	Ausich & Roeser	Late Kinderhookian	Cuyahoga Formation	United States	A camerate crinoid, a species of Aryballocrinus.	
Atelestocrinus meszarosi	Sp. nov	Valid	Kammer & Roeser	Kinderhookian	Cuyahoga Formation	United States	A cladid crinoid, a species of Atelestocrinus.	
Brissopsis (Kleinia) riccardii	Sp. nov	Valid	Parma	Eocene to Oligocene or early Miocene		Argentina	A brissopsid echinoid, a species of Brissopsis.	
Calceocrinus balticensis	Sp. nov	Valid	Ausich, Wilson & Vinn	Silurian (Llandovery)		Estonia	A disparid crinoid belonging to the group Calceocrinida.	
Ctenoimbricata	Gen. et sp. nov	Valid	Zamora, Rahman & Smith	Cambrian		Spain	A stem group echinoderm. The type species is Ctenoimbricata spinosa.	
Cuyahogacrinus	Gen. et sp. nov	Valid	Kammer & Roeser	Kinderhookian	Cuyahoga Formation	United States	A cladid crinoid. The type species is Cuyahogacrinus lodiensis.	
Cyathocrinites simplex	Sp. nov	Valid	Kammer & Roeser	Kinderhookian	Cuyahoga Formation	United States	A cladid crinoid, a species of Cyathocrinites.	
Cyrtocrinus praenutans	Sp. nov	Valid	Hess	Early Bathonian		France	A cyrtocrinid crinoid, a species of Cyrtocrinus.	
Desmidocrinus laevigatus	Sp. nov	Valid	Ausich, Wilson & Vinn	Silurian (Pridoli)	Kaugatuma Formation	Estonia	A camerate crinoid belonging to the group Monobathrida.	
Diploblastus fadigai	Sp. nov	Valid	Atwood & Sumrall	Carboniferous (Mississippian)	Glen Dean Formation	United States	A blastoid, a species of Diploblastus.	
Drepanocystis	Gen. et sp. nov	Valid	Sumrall et al.	Early Ordovician	Wah Wah Limestone	USA	A possible solute. The type species is Drepanocystis dubius.	
Eucalyptocrinites tumidus	Sp. nov	Valid	Ausich, Wilson & Vinn	Silurian (Pridoli)	Kaugatuma Formation	Estonia	A camerate crinoid belonging to the group Monobathrida.	
Faorina maullui	Sp. nov	Valid	Stara & Borghi	Early Miocene		Italy	A pericosmid sea urchin, a species of Faorina.	
Gastrocrinus leunisseni	Sp. nov	Valid	Franke	Devonian		Germany	A cladid crinoid belonging to the family Botryocrinidae.	
Goniocrinus sceletus	Sp. nov	Valid	Kammer & Roeser	Kinderhookian	Cuyahoga Formation	United States	A cladid crinoid, a species of Goniocrinus.	
Heckerocrinus	Nom nov.	Valid	Doweld	Ordovician			A replacement name for the crinoid genus Bockia Hecker 1940.	
Leadagmara	Gen. et sp. nov	Valid	Thuy et al.	Late Triassic (early Carnian)		Japan	An ophiacanthid brittle star. The type species is Leadagmara gracilispina.	
Lebetocrinus ohioensis	Sp. nov	Valid	Kammer & Roeser	Kinderhookian	Cuyahoga Formation	United States	A cladid crinoid, a species of Lebetocrinus.	
Neotaxocrinus	Gen. et sp. nov	Valid	Mirantsev	Late Carboniferous (Pennsylvanian)		Russia	A taxocrinid crinoid. The type species is Neotaxocrinus arendti.	
Palaeocomaster messingi	Sp. nov	Valid	Hess	Early Bathonian		France	A comatulid crinoid, a species of Palaeocomaster.	
Paradiabolocrinus teres	Sp. nov	Valid	Hearn & Deline	Late Ordovician	Lexington Limestone	United States	A camerate crinoid belonging to the group Diplobathra and the family Rhodocrinitidae.	
Pentacrinites ausichi	Sp. nov	Valid	Hess	Late Bajocian or early Bathonian		France	A species of Pentacrinites.	
Pentremites fredericki	Sp. nov	Valid	Atwood & Sumrall	Carboniferous (Mississippian)	Glen Dean Formation	United States	A blastoid, a species of Pentremites.	
Pentremites meganae	Sp. nov	Valid	Atwood & Sumrall	Carboniferous (Mississippian)	Glen Dean Formation	United States	A blastoid, a species of Pentremites.	
Phyllocrinus voultensis	Sp. nov	Valid	Hess	Early Bathonian		France	A cyrtocrinid crinoid, a species of Phyllocrinus.	
Phymosoma ravni	Sp nov.	Valid	Schlüter et al.	Late Cretaceous		Western Europe and Middle East	A phymosomatoid sea urchin, a species of Phymosoma.	
Platycrinites burkei	Sp. nov	Valid	Ausich & Roeser	Late Kinderhookian	Cuyahoga Formation	United States	A camerate crinoid, a species of Platycrinites sensu lato.	
Praetetracrinus bathonicus	Sp. nov	Valid	Hess	Early Bathonian		France	A cyrtocrinid crinoid, a species of Praetetracrinus.	
Propoteriocrinus hosingeni	Sp. nov	Valid	Franke	Devonian		Germany; Luxembourg	A cladid crinoid belonging to the family Glossocrinidae.	
Pygolampas	Gen. et sp. nov	Valid	Saucède, Dudicourt & Courville	Early Cretaceous (Early Hauterivian)		France	A sea urchin. The type species is Pygolampas edita.	
Saaremaacrinus	Gen. et sp. nov	Valid	Ausich, Wilson & Vinn	Silurian (Pridoli)	Kaugatuma Formation	Estonia	A camerate crinoid belonging to the group Monobathrida. The type species is S. estoniensis.	
Salvaster	Gen. et sp. nov	Valid	Saucède, Dudicourt & Courville	Early Cretaceous (Early Hauterivian)		France	A sea urchin. The type species is Salvaster roberti.	
Scutellacrinus	Gen. et sp. nov	Valid	Hess	Late Bajocian or early Bathonian		France	A cyrtocrinid crinoid. The type species is Scutellacrinus tenuis.	
Segmentocolumnus (col.) hanshessi	Sp. nov	Valid	Donovan et al.	Middle Ordovician (latest Darriwilian)		China	Probably a stem-group cladid crinoid, possibly a dendrocrinid; a species of Segmentocolumnus.	
Singillatimetra	Gen. et sp. nov	Valid	Hess	Early Bathonian		France	A comatulid crinoid. The type species is Singillatimetra inordinata.	
Solanocrinites voultensis	Sp. nov	Valid	Hess	Early Bathonian		France	A comatulid crinoid, a species of Solanocrinites.	
Thylechinus (Thylechinus) sinaiensis	Sp. nov	Valid	Abdelhamid & Azab	Turonian		Egypt	A phymosomatid echinoid, a species of Thylechinus.	
Toxaster dakhlensis	Sp. nov	Valid	Abdelhamid & Azab	Turonian		Egypt	A toxasterid echinoid, a species of Thylechinus.	
Tripatagus	Gen. et sp. nov	Valid	Zachos	Oligocene (Rupelian)	Marianna Limestone	United States	A heart urchin belonging to the group Micrasterina. The type species is T. pittsi.	
Yanjiahella	Gen. et 3 sp. nov	Valid	Guo et al.	Early Cambrian	Yanjiahe Formation	China	An animal of uncertain phylogenetic position, a possible relative of echinoderms. Genus contains Yanjiahella ancarpa (the type species), Y. monocarpa and Y. biscarpa.	

== Ascidians ==
Name	Novelty	Status	Authors	Age	Unit	Location	Notes	Images
Burykhia	Gen. et sp.	Valid	Fedonkin et al.	Vendian	Verkhovka Formation or Ust-Pinega Formation	Russia	An ausiid, a possible ascidian, Its type species is Burykhia hunti.	

== Conodonts ==
Name	Novelty	Status	Authors	Age	Unit	Location	Notes	Images
Carnepigondolella angulata	Sp nov	Valid	Mazza, Cau & Rigo	Late Triassic		Canada Italy	Originally described as a species of Carnepigondolella; Orchard (2014) transferred this species to the genus Quadralella.	
Carnepigondolella gulloae	Sp nov	Valid	Mazza, Rigo & Gullo	Late Triassic	Scillato Formation	Italy	A species of Carnepigondolella.	
Carnepigondolella tuvalica	Sp nov	Valid	Mazza, Rigo & Gullo	Late Triassic	Scillato Formation	Italy	A species of Carnepigondolella.	
Caudicriodus schoenlaubi	Sp nov	Valid	Drygant & Szaniawski	Early Devonian (middle to late Lochkovian)	Chortkiv Formation	Ukraine	An icriodontid, a species of Caudicriodus.	
Epigondolella heinzi	Sp nov	Valid	Mazza, Cau & Rigo	Late Triassic		Italy	A species of Epigondolella.	
Epigondolella miettoi	Sp nov	Valid	Mazza, Cau & Rigo	Late Triassic		Italy	A species of Epigondolella.	
Idiognathodus espinamaenis	Sp. nov	Valid	Méndez	Carboniferous (Moscovian)		Spain		
Idiognathodus mendezi	Sp. nov	Valid	Méndez	Carboniferous (Moscovian)		Spain		
Meiognathus	Gen. et sp. nov	Valid	Shen et al.	Permian (Kungurian)		Japan	A member of Ozarkodinida belonging to the family Sweetognathidae. The type species is Meiognathus pustulus.	
Muellerina	Gen. et sp. nov	Junior homonym	Bardashev & Bardasheva	Middle Devonian (Givetian)		Tajikistan	The type species is Muellerina idrisovi. The generic name turned out to be preoccupied by Muellerina Bassiouni (1965); Bardashev & Bardasheva (2013) subsequently renamed the conodont genus Muellerilepis.	
Nealeodus	Gen. et comb. nov	Valid	Stouge	Middle Ordovician		Canada	A new genus for "Lenodus" martinpointensis (Johnston and Barnes, 2000).	
Norigondolella trinacriae	Sp nov	Valid	Mazza, Cau & Rigo	Late Triassic		Italy	Originally described as a species of Norigondolella; Karádi, Kozur & Görögt (2013) considered it more likely to be a species of Paragondolella.	
Pandorinellina? parva	Sp nov	Valid	Drygant & Szaniawski	Early Devonian (late Lochkovian or Pragian)	Ivanye Formation	Ukraine	A spathognathodontid, possibly a species of Pandorinellina.	
Periodon hankensis	Sp nov	Valid	Stouge	Middle Ordovician		Canada	A species of Periodon.	
Polygnathus chongqingensis	Sp. nov	Valid	Wang in Gong et al.	Devonian		China		
Pseudopolygnathus inordinatus	Nom. nov	Valid	Tragelehn & Hartenfels	Devonian (Famennian)		Germany	A replacement name for Pseudopolygnathus irregularis Tragelehn & Hartenfels (2011) (preoccupied by Pseudopolygnathus irregularis Branson, 1934).	
Spinodus wardi	Sp nov	Valid	Stouge	Middle Ordovician		Canada	A species of Spinodus.	

== Fishes ==
During 2012, 81 new species of fish were described.

== Amphibians ==
=== Research ===
- A study of the braincase of Eocaecilia micropodia and a phylogenetic analysis of non-amniote tetrapods is published by Hillary C. Maddin, Farish A. Jenkins Jr and Jason S. Anderson (2012).
- A study of anatomy and relationships of Solenodonsaurus janenschi is published by Marylène Danto, Florian Witzmann and Johannes Müller (2012).
- A study of limb joint mobility of Ichthyostega is published by Stephanie E. Pierce, Jennifer A. Clack and John R. Hutchinson (2012).

=== New taxa ===
==== Newly named basal tetrapods ====
Name	Novelty	Status	Authors	Age	Unit	Location	Notes	Images
Ymeria	Gen. et sp. nov	Valid	Clack, Ahlberg, Blom & Finney	Famennian	Celsius Bjerg Group	Greenland	A stem tetrapod closely related to Ichthyostega.	

==== Newly named temnospondyls ====
Name	Novelty	Status	Authors	Age	Unit	Location	Notes	Images
Arachana	Gen. et sp. nov	Valid	Piñeiro, Ramos & Marsicano	? Late Permian	Buena Vista Formation	Uruguay	A rhinesuchid-like stereospondyl.	
Benthosuchus gusevae	Sp. nov	Valid	Novikov	Early Triassic	Kamennyi Yar Formation	Russia	A trematosauroid.	
Cacops woehri	Sp. nov	Valid	Fröbisch & Reisz	Leonardian		USA	A dissorophid.	
Microposaurus averyi	Sp nov	Valid	Warren	Anisian	Rouse Hill Siltstone	Australia	A trematosaurine stereospondyl, a species of Microposaurus.	Microposaurus averyi.
Nyranerpeton	Gen. et sp. nov	Valid	Werneburg	Late Carboniferous		Czech Republic	A micromelerpetontid. The type species is Nyranerpeton amilneri.	
Platyrhinops fritschi	Sp. nov	Valid	Werneburg	Late Carboniferous		Czech Republic	An amphibamiform. Originally described as a species of Platyrhinops, but subsequently made the type species of a separate genus Anthracobamus.	
Qantas	Gen. et sp. nov	Valid	Novikov	Early Triassic	Kamennyi Yar Formation	Russia	A trematosauroid temnospondyl. The type species is Qantas samarensis.	
Sclerocephalus stambergi	Sp nov	Valid	Klembara & Steyer	Early Permian	Boskovice Basin	Czech Republic	A stereospondylomorph, a species of Sclerocephalus.	
Trematosuchoides	Gen. et sp. nov	Valid	Novikov	Triassic	Cynognathus Assemblage Zone	South Africa	A trematosaurid temnospondyl. The type species is Trematosuchoides africanus.	

==== Newly named lepospondyls ====
Name	Novelty	Status	Authors	Age	Unit	Location	Notes	Images
Altenglanerpeton	Gen. et sp. nov	Valid	Glienke	Gzhelian or Asselian	Altenglan Formation	Germany	A microsaur with an elongated body.	

==== Newly named lissamphibians ====
Name	Novelty	Status	Authors	Age	Unit	Location	Notes	Images
Albionbatrachus oligocenicus	Sp. nov	Valid	Venczel, Codrea & Fărcaş	Early Oligocene		Romania	A palaeobatrachid frog, a species of Albionbatrachus.	
Bakonybatrachus	Gen. et sp. nov	Valid	Szentesi & Venczel	Santonian	Csehbánya Formation	Hungary	A discoglossine discoglossid.	
Beiyanerpeton	Gen. et sp. nov	Valid	Gao & Shubin	Oxfordian	Tiaojishan Formation	China	A salamandroid. The type species is Beiyanerpeton jianpingensis.	
Calyptocephalella satan	Sp. nov	Valid	Agnolin	Late Cretaceous (Campanian-Maastrichtian)	Allen Formation	Argentina	A member of Calyptocephalellidae, a relative of the helmeted water toad.	
Gigantobatrachus casamiquelai	Sp. nov	Valid	Agnolin	Paleocene		Argentina	A member of Calyptocephalellidae, a species of Gigantobatrachus.	
Piceoerpeton naylori	Sp. nov.	Valid	Gardner	Latest Cretaceous (late Maastrichtian), possibly also early Paleocene		United States	A scapherpetontid salamander, a species of Piceoerpeton.	
Rana auscitana	Nom. nov	Valid	Martín, Alonso-Zarazaga & Sanchiz	Middle Miocene		France	A replacement name for Rana pygmaea Lartet (1851).	
Rana cadurcorum	Nom. nov	Junior synonym	Martín, Alonso-Zarazaga & Sanchiz	Eocene	Quercy Phosphorites	France	A replacement name for Rana plicata Filhol (1877). Reinterpreted as a junior synonym of Thaumastosaurus gezei by Laloy et al. (2013).	
Rana sendoa	Nom. nov	Valid	Martín, Alonso-Zarazaga & Sanchiz	Late Pleistocene		Germany	A replacement name for Rana robusta Brunner (1956).	
Seminobatrachus	Gen. et sp. nov	Valid	Skutschas & Gubin	late Paleocene - early Eocene		Ukraine	A urodelan salamander	
Uberabatrachus	Gen. et sp. nov	Valid	Báez et al.	Maastrichtian	Marília Formation	Brazil	A neobatrachian, a possible member of Nobleobatrachia. The type species is Uberabatrachus carvalhoi.	

== Parareptiles ==
=== Newly named parareptiles ===
Name	Novelty	Status	Authors	Age	Unit	Location	Notes	Images
Feeserpeton	Gen. et sp. nov.	Valid	Macdougall & Reisz	Early Permian		United States	A lanthanosuchoid. The type species is Feeserpeton oklahomensis.	
Lasasaurus	Gen. et sp. nov.	Valid	Falconnet et al.	Lower Triassic	Middle Sakamena Formation	Madagascar	A procolophonid. The type species is Lasasaurus beltanae.	

== Ichthyopterygians ==
=== Newly named ichthyosaurs ===
Name	Novelty	Status	Authors	Age	Unit	Location	Notes	Images
Acamptonectes	Gen. et sp. nov	Valid	Fischer et al..	Hauterivian–Cenomanian	Cambridge Greensand Formation	United Kingdom	An ophthalmosaurid. Type species is Acamptonectes densus.	Skull roof of Acamptonectes densus.
Cryopterygius	Gen. et sp. nov	Disputed	Druckenmiller et al.	Late Jurassic	Agardhfjellet Formation	Norway	An ophthalmosaurid. The type species is Cryopterygius kristiansenae. Zverkov & Efimov (2019) considered this species to be synonymous with Undorosaurus gorodischensis, while Delsett et al. (2019) considered it to be a distinct species, albeit possibly belonging to the genus Undorosaurus.	
Palvennia	Gen. et sp. nov	Valid	Druckenmiller et al.	Late Jurassic	Agardhfjellet Formation	Norway	An ophthalmosaurid. The type species is Palvennia hoybergeti. Zverkov & Prilepskaya (2019) considered Palvennia to be a junior synonym of the genus Arthropterygius, though the authors maintained P. hoybergeti as a distinct species within the latter genus; Delsett et al. (2019) rejected this synonymy.	
Stenopterygius aaleniensis	Sp. nov	Valid	Maxwell, Fernández & Schoch	Aalenian		Germany	A species of Stenopterygius.	The holotype of Stenopterygius aaleniensis.
Temnodontosaurus azerguensis	Sp. nov	Valid	Martin et al.	Middle Toarcian		France	A species of Temnodontosaurus.	

== Lepidosauromorphs ==
=== Newly named saurosphargids ===
Name	Novelty	Status	Authors	Age	Unit	Location	Notes	Images
Largocephalosaurus	Gen. et sp. nov	Valid	Cheng, Chen, Zeng & Cai	Middle Triassic	Guanling Formation	China	Initially thought to be an eosauropterygian sauropterygian and a relative of Wumengosaurus, pachypleurosaurs and nothosauroids, but subsequently reinterpreted as member of Saurosphargidae (a non-sauropterygian diapsid, though related to sauropterygians), closely related to Saurosphargis and Sinosaurosphargis. The type species is Largocephalosaurus polycarpon.	

=== Newly named sauropterygians ===
Name	Novelty	Status	Authors	Age	Unit	Location	Notes	Images
Albertonectes	Gen. et sp. nov	Valid	Kubo, Mitchell & Henderson	Upper Campanian	Bearpaw Formation	Canada	An elasmosaurid. The type species is Albertonectes vanderveldei.	Albertonectes vanderveldei.
Anningasaura	Gen. et sp. nov.	Valid	Vincent & Benson	Early Jurassic		United Kingdom	A basal member of Plesiosauria. The type species is Anningasaura lymense.	
Avalonnectes	Gen. et sp. nov	Valid	Benson, Evans & Druckenmiller	Early Jurassic, most likely earliest Hettangian.	Blue Lias Formation	United Kingdom	A rhomaleosaurid. The type species is Avalonnectes arturi.	Avalonnectes.
Djupedalia	Gen. et sp. nov.	Valid	Knutsen, Druckenmiller & Hurum	Late Jurassic	Agardhfjellet Formation	Norway	A long-necked plesiosaurian. The type species is Djupedalia engeri.	
Dolichorhynchops tropicensis	Sp. nov.	Valid	McKean	Early Turonian	Tropic Shale	United States	Originally described as a third species of Dolichorhynchops, Clark, O'Keefe & Slack (2023) later moved it to the distinct genus Scalamagnus.	
Eoplesiosaurus	Gen. et sp. nov	Valid	Benson, Evans & Druckenmiller	Early Jurassic, most likely earliest Hettangian.		United Kingdom	A basal plesiosauroid. The type species is Eoplesiosaurus antiquior.	Eoplesiosaurus.
Hastanectes	Gen. et comb. nov	Valid	Benson et al.	Early Cretaceous		United Kingdom	A new genus for "Cimoliasaurus" valdensis	
Lusonectes	Gen. et sp. nov	Valid	Smith, Araújo & Mateus	Toarcian	São Gião Formation	Portugal	A plesiosaurid plesiosaur.	
Pliosaurus funkei	Sp. nov	Valid	Knutsen, Druckenmiller & Hurum	Late Jurassic	Agardhfjellet Formation	Norway	A species of Pliosaurus.	
Qianxisaurus	Gen. et sp. nov	Valid	Cheng et al.	Middle Triassic (Ladinian)	Falang Formation	China	An eosauropterygian, a relative of pachypleurosaurs and nothosauroids. The type species is Qianxisaurus chajiangensis.	
Spitrasaurus	Gen. et 2 sp. nov.	Valid	Knutsen, Druckenmiller & Hurum	Late Jurassic	Agardhfjellet Formation	Norway	A long-necked plesiosaurian. Genus contains two species: Spitrasaurus wensaasi and S. larseni.	
Stratesaurus	Gen. et sp.	Valid	Benson, Evans & Druckenmiller	Early Jurassic, most likely earliest Hettangian.	Blue Lias Formation	United Kingdom	A rhomaleosaurid. The type species is Stratesaurus taylori	Stratesaurus.
Vectocleidus	Gen. et sp. nov	Valid	Benson et al.	Early Cretaceous (late Barremian)	Vectis Formation	United Kingdom	A leptocleidid. The type species is Vectocleidus pastorum.	

=== Newly named rhynchocephalians ===
Name	Novelty	Status	Authors	Age	Unit	Location	Notes	Images
Oenosaurus	Gen. et sp. nov	Valid	Rauhut et al.	Late Jurassic (early Tithonian)	Mörnsheim Formation	Germany	A sphenodontid rhynchocephalian. The type species is Oenosaurus muehlheimensis.	
Sphenocondor	Gen. et sp. nov	Valid	Apesteguía, Gómez & Rougier	Middle Jurassic		Argentina	A rhynchocephalian lepidosaur. The type species is Sphenocondor gracilis.	

=== Squamates ===
==== Research ====
- A large phylogenetic analysis of living and fossil squamates is published by Jacques A. Gauthier et al. (2012).
- A study of squamate diversity in North America during the latest Cretaceous (Maastrichtian) and the impact of Cretaceous–Paleogene extinction event on the diversity of the group is published by Nicholas R. Longrich, Bhart-Anjan S. Bhullar and Jacques A. Gauthier (2012).

==== New taxa ====
Name	Novelty	Status	Authors	Age	Unit	Location	Notes	Images
Chianghsia	Gen. et sp. nov	Valid	Mo, Xu & Evans	Late Cretaceous	Nanxiong Formation	China	A platynotan lizard, probably a monstersaurian. The type species is Chianghsia nankangensis.	
Dornosaurus	Gen. et sp. nov	Valid	Alifanov	Eocene		Mongolia	An arretosaurid iguanian. The type species is Dornosaurus gobiensis.	
Eremiasaurus	Gen. et sp. nov	Valid	Leblanc, Caldwell & Bardet	Maastrichtian		Morocco	A mosasaur.	
Ergiliinsaurus	Gen. et sp. nov	Valid	Alifanov	Oligocene	Ergiliin Zoo Formation	Mongolia	An arretosaurid iguanian. The type species is Ergiliinsaurus postumus.	
Jucaraseps	Gen. et sp. nov	Valid	Bolet & Evans	Early Cretaceous		Spain	A lizard related to scleroglossan lizards. The type species is Jucaraseps grandipes.	
Khaichinguana	Gen. et sp. nov	Valid	Alifanov	Eocene	Khaychin Formation	Mongolia	An arretosaurid iguanian. The type species is Khaichinguana eocaenica.	
Louisamphisbaena	Gen. et sp. nov	Valid	Augé	Eocene (Bartonian)		France	An amphisbaenian lizard, possibly a member of Blanidae. The type species is Louisamphisbaena ferox.	
Pannoniasaurus	Gen. et sp. nov	Valid	Makádi, Caldwell & Ősi	Late Cretaceous (Santonian)	Ajka Coal Formation; Csehbánya Formation	Hungary	A tethysaurine mosasauroid closely related to Tethysaurus, Russellosaurus and Yaguarasaurus. The type species is Pannoniasaurus inexpectatus.	
?Placosaurus ragei	Sp. nov.	Valid	Sullivan et al.	Earliest Eocene		Belgium	A glyptosaurine anguid lizard. Originally described as a possible species of Placosaurus; Čerňanský et al. (2024) transferred it to the genus Gaultia.	
Pseudomimeosaurus	Gen. et comb. nov	Valid	Alifanov	Late Cretaceous	Djadochta Formation	Mongolia	A pleurodontagamid iguanian lizard; a new genus for "Mimeosaurus" tugrikinensis Alifanov (1989).	
Pseudopus ahnikoviensis	Sp. nov	Valid	Klembara	Early Miocene		Czech Republic	An anguid, a species of Pseudopus.	
Purbicella	Gen. et sp. nov.	Valid	Evans, Jones & Matsumoto	Early Cretaceous	Purbeck Limestone Group	United Kingdom	A member of Lacertoidea. The type species isPurbicella ragei.	
Ragesaurus	Gen. et sp. nov.	Valid	Bailon & Auge	Early Pleistocene		Spain	An anguid lizard. The type species is Ragesaurus medasensis.	
Sphaerodactylus ciguapa	Sp. nov	Valid	Daza & Bauer	Late Early Miocene or early Middle Miocene (20 to 15 MYA)		Dominican Republic	A sphaerodactylid gecko found in Dominican amber, a species of Sphaerodactylus.	
Telmasaurus bialynickae	Sp. nov	Valid	Alifanov	Late Cretaceous	Barun Goyot Formation	Mongolia	A varanoid lizard, a species of Telmasaurus.	
Uquiasaurus	Gen. et sp. nov	Disputed	Daza et al.	Late Pliocene	Uquía Formation	Argentina	An iguanian lizard. The type species is Uquiasaurus heptanodonta. Scanferla & Díaz-Fernández (2023) reinterpreted the type series of this species as a fossil bone assemblage composed by more than one species of Liolaemus.	
Varanus (Varaneades) amnhophilis	Subgen. et sp. nov	Disputed	Conrad, Balcarcel & Mehling	Miocene (Turolian)	Mytilini Formation	Greece	A monitor lizard. Villa et al. (2018) considered this species to be likely junior synonym of Varanus marathonensis.	

== Turtles ==
=== Research ===
- A large phylogenetic analysis of basal turtles is published by Jérémy Anquetin (2012).

=== New taxa ===
Name	Novelty	Status	Authors	Age	Unit	Location	Notes	Images
Allopleuron qazaqstanense	Sp. nov	Valid	Karl, Gröning & Brauckmann	Eocene (Lutetian)		Kazakhstan	A member of Cheloniidae, a species of Allopleuron.	
Axestemys cerevisia	sp nov	Valid	Vitek	Eocene	Bridger Formation	United States	A trionychid, a species of Axestemys.	
Axestemys montinsana	sp nov	Valid	Vitek	Paleocene	Denver Formation; Fort Union Formation; Melville Formation	United States	A trionychid, a species of Axestemys.	
Ballerstedtia	Gen. et comb. et sp. nov	Valid	Karl et al.	Early Cretaceous		Germany; United Kingdom	A member of Paracryptodira, a new genus for "Pleurosternon" typocardium Seeley (1869). Genus also contains a new species Ballerstedtia bueckebergensis.	
Bashuchelys	Gen. et comb. et sp. nov	Valid	Tong, Danilov, Ye, Ouyang & Peng	Middle Jurassic	Xiashaximiao Formation	China	A bashuchelyid cryptodiran, a new genus for "Chengyuchelys" zigongensis (Ye, 1982). Genus also contains a new species Bashuchelys youngi.	
Berruchelus	Gen. et sp. nov	Valid	Pérez-García	Upper Paleocene		France	A paracryptodiran closely related to Compsemys. The type species is Berruchelus russelli.	
Carbonemys	Gen. et sp. nov	Valid	Cadena et al.	Late Palaeocene	Cerrejón Formation	Colombia	A podocnemidid turtle. The type species is Carbonemys cofrinii.	
Chuannanchelys	Gen. et comb. nov	Valid	Tong, Danilov, Ye, Ouyang & Peng	Middle Jurassic	Xiashaximiao Formation	China	A bashuchelyid cryptodiran, a new genus for "Chengyuchelys" dashanpuensis (Fang, 1987).	
Foxemys trabanti	sp nov	Valid	Rabi, Tong & Botfalvai	Santonian	Csehbánya Formation	Hungary	A bothremydid, a species of Foxemys.	
Galvechelone	Gen. et sp. nov	Valid	Pérez-García & Murelaga	Early Cretaceous		Spain	A cryptodiran turtle. The type species is Galvechelone lopezmartinezae.	
Guangdongemys	Gen. et sp. nov.	Valid	Claude et al.	Late Eocene		China	A geoemydid turtle. The type species is Guangdongemys pingi.	
Hoyasemys	Gen. et sp. nov	Valid	Pérez-García, Fuente & Ortega	Late Barremian	Calizas de La Huérguina Formation	Spain	A basal eucryptodiran.	
Iberoccitanemys	Gen. et comb. nov	Valid	Pérez-García, Ortega & Murelaga	Late Campanian to Maastrichtian		France; Spain	A bothremydid, a new genus for "Elochelys" convenarum (Laurent et al. 2002). Pérez-García, Ortega & Murelaga (2021) considered I. convenarum to be a junior synonym of "Polysternon" atlanticum, resulting in a new combination Iberoccitanemys atlanticum.	
Kinosternon pojoaque	Species	Valid	Bourque	Middle Miocene		United States	A species of Kinosternon.	
Kinosternon skullridgescens	Species	Valid	Bourque	Early middle Miocene	Tesuque Formation	United States	A species of Kinosternon.	
Larachelus	Gen. et sp. nov	Valid	Pérez-García & Murelaga	Early Cretaceous (late Hauterivian–early Barremian)	Pinilla de los Moros Formation	Spain	A basal member of Pan-Cryptodira (the clade containing living cryptodirans and all extinct turtles that were more closely related to them than to pleurodirans). The type species is Larachelus morla.	
Oertelia	Gen. et comb. nov	Valid	Karl, Biermann & Tichy	Early Cretaceous (early Aptian)		Germany	A toxochelyid sea turtle, a new genus for "Toxochelys" gigantea Oertel (1914).	
Peligrochelys	Gen. et sp. nov	Valid	Sterli & de la Fuente	Palaeocene	Salamanca Formation	Argentina	A relative of meiolaniids. The type species is Peligrochelys walshae.	
Polysternon isonae	Species	Valid	Marmi et al..	Late Maastrichtian		Spain	A bothremydid, a species of Polysternon.	
Protoxinjiangchelys	Gen. et sp. nov	Valid	Tong, Danilov, Ye, Ouyang & Peng	Middle Jurassic	Xiashaximiao Formation	China	A xinjiangchelyid cryptodiran.	
Puentemys	Gen. et sp. nov.	Valid	Cadena, Bloch & Jaramillo	Paleocene	Cerrejón Formation	Colombia	A bothremydid turtle. The type species is Puentemys mushaisaensis.	
Rhinoclemmys panamaensis	Sp nov	Valid	Cadena et al.	Miocene	Cucaracha Formation	Panama	A geoemydid turtle, a species of Rhinoclemmys.	
Staurotypus moschus	Sp nov	Valid	Cadena et al.	Miocene	Cucaracha Formation	Panama	A kinosternid turtle, a species of Staurotypus.	
Tasbacka danica	Sp. nov	Valid	Karl & Madsen	Early Eocene	Fur Formation	Denmark	A member of Cheloniidae, a species of Tasbacka.	
Terrapene parornata	Sp nov	Valid	Joyce et al..	Miocene/Pliocene boundary		United States	A box turtle.	
Yuchelys	Gen. et sp. nov	Valid	Tong et al.	Late Cretaceous	Gaogou Formation	China	A nanhsiungchelyid cryptodiran. The type species is Yuchelys nanyangensis.	

== Archosauromorphs ==
=== Newly named basal archosauromorphs ===
Name	Novelty	Status	Authors	Age	Unit	Location	Notes	Images
Chanaresuchus ischigualastensis	sp nov	Valid	Trotteyn, Martínez & Alcober	Late Triassic	Ischigualasto Formation	Argentina	A proterochampsian archosauriform. Originally described as a species of Chanaresuchus; subsequently made the type species of a separate genus Pseudochampsa by Trotteyn & Ezcurra (2014).	
Diandongosuchus	Gen. et sp. nov.	Valid	Li et al.	Middle Triassic (Ladinian)	Falang Formation	China	A member of Archosauriformes of uncertain phylogenetic placement. Originally classified as a poposauroid pseudosuchian, but subsequently argued to be a phytosaur. The type species is Diandongosuchus fuyuanensis.	Diandongosuchus fuyuanensis.
Doswellia sixmilensis	sp nov	Valid	Heckert, Lucas & Spielmann	Late Triassic	Bluewater Creek Formation	United States	A doswelliid archosauromorph. Originally described as a species of Doswellia; Wynd et al. (2020) transferred it to the separate genus Rugarhynchos.	
Protome	Gen. et sp. nov	Valid	Stocker	Late Triassic	Chinle Formation	USA	A phytosaur. The type species is Protome batalaria.	

=== Archosaurs ===
The following is a summary of the archosaurs described in 2012

- 8 pseudosuchians
- 1 basal dinosauriform
- 40 non-avian dinosaurs
- 64 birds
- 9 pterosaurs
- 1 archosaur of uncertain phylogenetic placement

== Synapsids ==
=== Non-mammalian synapsids ===
==== Research ====
- A phylogenetic analysis of basal synapsids is published by Roger B. J. Benson (2012).

==== New taxa ====
Name	Novelty	Status	Authors	Age	Unit	Location	Notes	Images
Fortunodon	Gen. et comb. nov	Valid	Kurkin	Upper Permian		Russia	A dicynodont, a new genus for "Dicynodon" trautscholdi (Amalitzky, 1922) (considered to be a senior synonym of Vivaxosaurus permirus and assigned to the genus Vivaxosaurus by Kammerer et al., 2011). "Dicynodon" amalitzkii (Sushkin, 1926) is considered by Kurkin (2012) to be a second species of Fortunodon (Kammerer et al., 2011 classify it as the type species of the genus Peramodon.)	
Novocynodon	Gen. et sp. nov	Valid	Ivakhnenko	Middle Permian		Russia	A thrinaxodontid cynodont. The type species is Novocynodon kutorgai.	
Pampaphoneus	Gen. et sp. nov	Valid	Cisneros, Abdala, et al.	Guadalupian (Middle Permian)	Rio do Rasto Formation	Brazil	An anteosaurid dinocephalian.	
Panchetocynodon	Gen. et sp. nov	Valid	Das & Gupta	Early Triassic	Panchet Formation	India	A cynodont. The type species is Panchetocynodon damodarensis.	
Purbeckodon	Gen. et sp. nov	Valid	Butler, Sigogneau-Russell, & Ensom	Early Cretaceous	Purbeck Limestone Group	United Kingdom	A possible morganucodontan.	
Sludica	Gen. et sp. nov	Valid	Ivakhnenko	Upper Permian		Russia	A procynosuchid cynodont. The type species is Sludica bulanovi.	

=== Mammals ===
The following is a summary of the mammals described in 2012

- 9 non-eutherian mammals
- 24 eutherian mammals

== Other animals ==
Name	Novelty	Status	Authors	Age	Unit	Location	Notes	Images
Aggerscolex	Gen. et sp. nov	Valid	Botting et al.	Ordovician		United Kingdom	A palaeoscolecid. The type species is A. murchisoni.	
Belebey augustodunensis	Sp. nov.	Valid	Falconnet	Latest Carboniferous (Gzhelian) or earliest Permian (Asselian)		France	An amniote of uncertain phylogenetic placement. Originally classified as a bolosaurid and a species of Belebey; Spindler, Voigt & Fischer (2019) considered it to be a possible edaphosaurid synapsid instead.	
Bullascolex	Gen. et sp. nov	Valid	Botting et al.	Ordovician		United Kingdom	A palaeoscolecid. The type species is B. inserere.	
Carbotubulus	Gen. et sp. nov	Valid	Haug et al.	Carboniferous	Carbondale Formation	United States	A long-legged lobopodian. The type species is C. waloszeki.	
Circotheca smetanai	Sp. nov	Valid	Valent et al.	Middle Cambrian	Buchava Formation	Czech Republic	A member of Hyolitha (a group of animals of uncertain phylogenetic placement, possibly molluscs), a species of Circotheca.	
Coronacollina	Gen. et sp. nov.	Valid	Clites, Droser & Gehling	Ediacaran		Australia	An animal of uncertain phylogenetic placement. The type species is Coronacollina acula.	
Crenulipora kuwanoi	Sp. nov	Valid	Niko	Devonian	Fukuji Formation	Japan	A tabulate coral belonging to the group Favositida and the family Favositidae.	
Dispinoscolex	Gen. et sp. nov	Valid	Duan, Dong & Donoghue	Cambrian (Paibian)	Bitiao Formation	China	A palaeoscolecid. The type species is D. decorus.	
Favia maitreyiae	Sp. nov	Valid	López-Pérez	Pliocene	Carmen Formation	Mexico	A stony coral, a species of Favia.	
Favia tulsidasi	Sp. nov	Valid	López-Pérez	Pliocene	San Marcos Formation	Mexico	A stony coral, a species of Favia.	
Heydenius arachnius	Sp. nov	Valid	Poinar	Eocene to Miocene	Dominican amber	Dominican Republic	A nematode belonging to the family Mermithidae.	
Heydenius phasmatophilus	Sp. nov	Valid	Poinar	Eocene	Baltic amber	Russia (Kaliningrad Oblast)	A nematode belonging to the family Mermithidae.	
Heydenius podenasae	Sp. nov	Valid	Poinar	Eocene	Baltic amber	Russia (Kaliningrad Oblast)	A nematode belonging to the family Mermithidae.	
Heydenius trichorosus	Sp. nov	Valid	Poinar	Eocene	Baltic amber	Russia (Kaliningrad Oblast)	A nematode belonging to the family Mermithidae.	
Loriciscolex	Gen. et sp. nov	Valid	Botting et al.	Ordovician		United Kingdom	A palaeoscolecid. The type species is L. cuspidus.	
Parastriatopora boliviana	Sp. nov	Valid	Plusquellec, Tourneur & Fernández-Martínez in Racheboeuf et al.	Devonian (Emsian or Eifelian)	Belén Formation	Bolivia	A tabulate coral belonging to the superfamily Pachyporoidea and the family Parastriatoporidae.	
Placosmilia? aliciae	Sp. nov	Valid	López-Pérez	Pliocene	San Marcos Formation; San Nicolas Formation	Mexico	A stony coral belonging to the family Montlivaltiidae.	
Pluoscolex	Gen. et sp. nov	Valid	Botting et al.	Ordovician		United Kingdom	A palaeoscolecid. The type species is P. linearis.	
Probactrotheca	Gen. et sp. nov	Valid	Valent et al.	Middle Cambrian	Buchava Formation	Czech Republic	A member of Hyolitha. The type species is Probactrotheca briketa.	
Protomichelinia foveata	Sp. nov	Valid	Niko, Haikawa & Fujikawa	Permian	Akiyoshi Limestone Group	Japan	A tabulate coral.	
Pseudoromingeria muratai	Sp. nov	Valid	Niko, Haikawa & Fujikawa	Permian	Akiyoshi Limestone Group	Japan	A tabulate coral.	
Radnorscolex	Gen. et sp. nov	Valid	Botting et al.	Ordovician		United Kingdom	A palaeoscolecid. The type species is R. bwlchi.	
Redondagnathus	Gen. et sp. nov	Valid	Spielmann & Lucas	Late Triassic		United States	A vertebrate of uncertain phylogenetic placement. Described on the basis of three postcanine teeth, considered to be teeth of a trirachodontid cynodont by Lucas et al. (1999) and Spielmann and Lucas (2012). On the other hand, Abdala, Neveling and Welman (2006) and Sidor and Hopson (2018) did not consider it likely that Redondagnathus was a member of Trirachodontidae, and Abdala, Neveling and Welman (2006) weren't even sure whether it was a cynodont. The type species is Redondagnathus hunti.	
Schistoscolex hunanensis	Sp. nov	Valid	Duan, Dong & Donoghue	Cambrian (Paibian)	Bitiao Formation	China	A palaeoscolecid.	
Siderastrea annae	Sp. nov	Valid	López-Pérez	Pliocene	San Marcos Formation	Mexico	A stony coral, a species of Siderastrea.	
Sinopathes	Gen. et sp. nov	Valid	Baliński, Sun & Dzik	Early Ordovician	Fenxiang Formation	China	A black coral. The type species is S. reptans.	
Siphusauctum	Gen. et sp. nov	Valid	O'Brien & Caron	Middle Cambrian	Burgess Shale	Canada	A stem-bilaterian of uncertain phylogenetic placement, a stalked filter feeder. The type species is S. gregarium.	
Syringopora konishii	Sp. nov	Valid	Niko & Ibaraki	Carboniferous (Viséan)	Kotaki Formation	Japan	A tabulate coral belonging to the group Auloporida.	
Thecia ichikawai	Sp. nov	Valid	Niko & Adachi	Silurian	Gionyama Formation	Japan	A tabulate coral belonging to the group Favositida and the family Theciidae.	
Trachypsammia konbo	Sp. nov	Valid	Niko	Early Carboniferous	Akiyoshi Limestone Group	Japan	A tabulate coral.	
Ulexiscolex	Gen. et sp. nov	Valid	Botting et al.	Ordovician		United Kingdom	A palaeoscolecid. The type species is U. ormrodi.	
Wernia	Gen. et sp. nov	Valid	Botting et al.	Ordovician		United Kingdom	A palaeoscolecid. The type species is W. eximia.	

== Other organisms ==
Name	Novelty	Status	Authors	Age	Unit	Location	Notes	Images
Hydrolithon braganum	Sp. nov	Valid	Woelkerling, Bassi & Iryu	Quaternary		Reef terraces around Tahiti, French Polynesia	A red alga belonging to the family Corallinaceae, a species of Hydrolithon.	
Jimwhitea	Gen. et sp. nov	Valid	Krings & Taylor in Krings et al.	Middle Triassic	Fremouw Formation	Antarctica	A fungus belonging to the group Endogonales. The type species is Jimwhitea circumtecta.	
