= Novocynodon =

Novocynodon Temporal range: Middle Permian

Scientific classification
- Domain: Eukaryota
- Kingdom: Animalia
- Phylum: Chordata
- Clade: Synapsida
- Clade: Therapsida
- Family: incertae sedis
- Genus: †Novocynodon; Ivachnenko, 2012

Type species
- †Novocynodon kutorgai Ivachnenko, 2012

Extinct genus of therapsids

Novocynodon is an extinct genus of therapsids from the Middle Permian of Russia. Fossils have been found in Alexandrovsky District, Orenburg Oblast. The type and only species is Novocynodon kutorgai. It was classified as a thrinaxodontid cynodont when first described in 2012, but this was disputed by Kammerer (2014), who argued that it might instead be a juvenile anomodont or dinocephalian.
