= Glyptoria =

Scientific classification
- Domain: Eukaryota
- Kingdom: Animalia
- Phylum: Brachiopoda
- Class: Rhynchonellata
- Order: †Protorthida
- Family: †Protorthidae
- Genus: †Glyptoria

Genus of marine lamp shells

Glyptoria is a genus of protorthid brachiopod with a ventral spondylium. It is characterized by a free apical plate in the ventral valve interior and a distinctive coarse, lamellose ornament.
