= Israelaria =

Israelaria Temporal range: Early Cambrian

Scientific classification
- Kingdom: Animalia
- Phylum: Brachiopoda
- Class: Rhynchonellata
- Order: †Protorthida
- Family: †Protorthidae
- Genus: †Israelaria; Cooper, 1976

Type species
- Israelaria parnesi

Extinct genus of brachiopod

Israelaria is an extinct genus of protorthid brachiopod that lived in what is now Israel in the Cambrian period. It is a monotypic genus known from a single species, I. parnesi.

== Etymology ==
Israelaria is named after the state of Israel.
