= Alexandrovka, Alexandrovsky District, Orenburg Oblast =

Alexandrovka Александровка
- Selo
- Interactive map of Alexandrovka
- Location of Alexandrovka Alexandrovka (Orenburg Oblast)
- Coordinates: 52°40′44″N 54°24′53″E
- Country: Russia
- Federal subject: Orenburg Oblast
- Administrative district: Alexandrovsky District
- SettlementSelsoviet: Alexandrovka Settlement

Population (2010 Census)
  - Total: 3,988
  - Estimate (2021): 4,185 (+4.9%)

Administrative status
  - Capital of: Alexandrovsky District, Alexandrovka Settlement

Municipal status
  - Municipal district: Alexandrovsky Municipal District
  - Rural settlement: Alexandrovsky Selsoviet Rural Settlement
  - Capital of: Alexandrovsky Municipal District, Alexandrovsky Selsoviet Rural Settlement
- Time zone: UTC+5 (MSK+2)
- Postal code: 461830
- OKTMO ID: 53606402101

Alexandrovka (Russian: Александровка) is a rural locality (a selo) and the administrative center of Alexandrovsky District of Orenburg Oblast, Russia. Population: 3,988 (2010 census); 4,152 (2002 census); 3,976 (1989 Soviet census).
