= Sludica =

Sludica Temporal range: Middle-Late Permian 265–254 Ma

Scientific classification
- Domain: Eukaryota
- Kingdom: Animalia
- Phylum: Chordata
- Clade: Synapsida
- Clade: Therapsida
- Clade: Cynodontia
- Family: †Procynosuchidae
- Genus: †Sludica; Ivakhnenko, 2012

Type species
- †Sludica bulanovi Ivakhnenko, 2012

Extinct genus of cynodonts

Sludica is an extinct genus of procynosuchid cynodont from the Late Permian of Russia. Fossils have been found in the Ilinskoe Assemblage Zone within Velikoustyugsky District in Vologda Oblast, correlated with the Cistecephalus Assemblage Zone. The type and only species is Sludica bulanovi.
