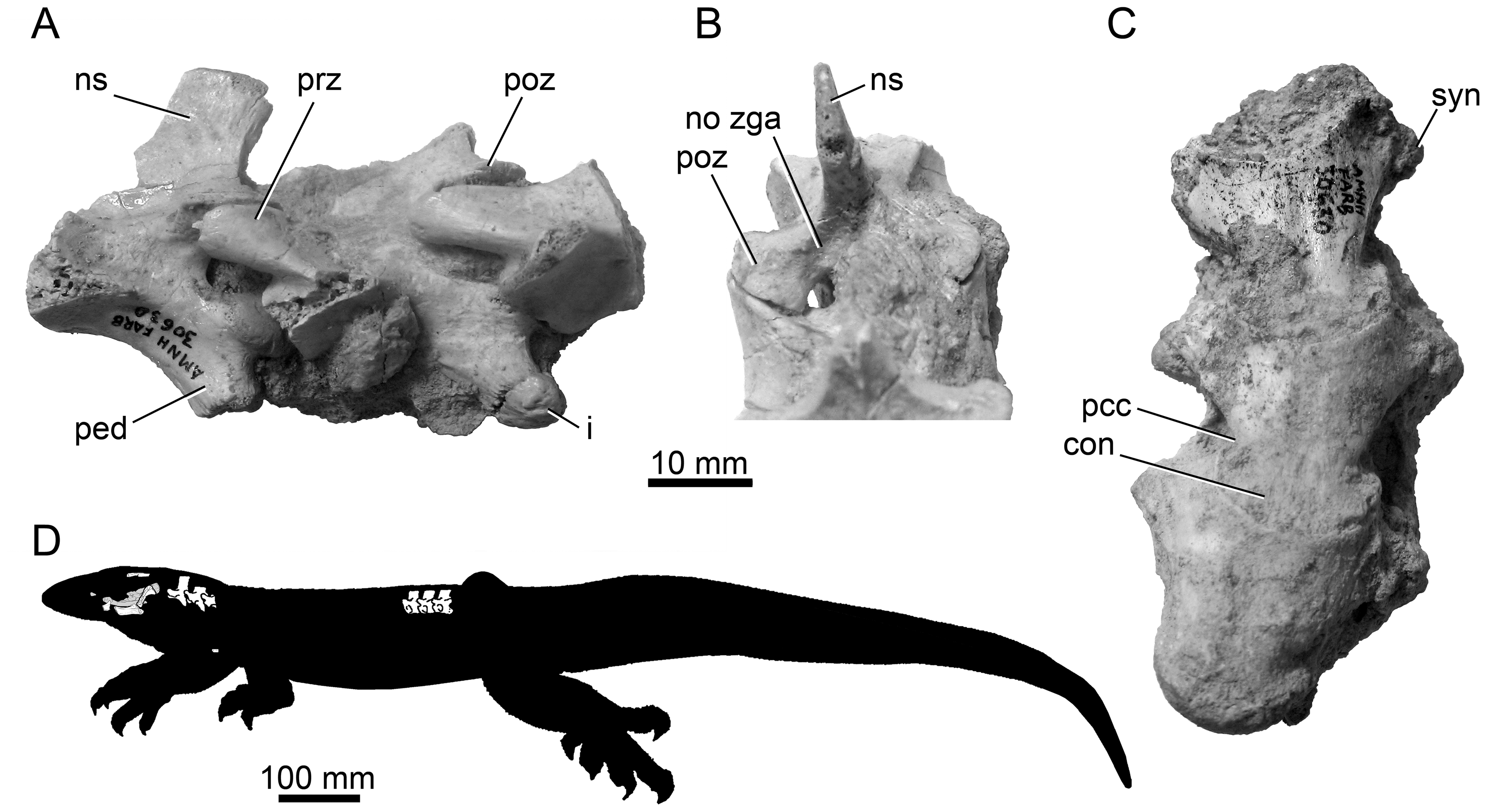
- Vertebrae and skeletal restoration of the "V. amnhophilis" holotype

Scientific classification
- Kingdom: Animalia
- Phylum: Chordata
- Class: Reptilia
- Order: Squamata
- Suborder: Anguimorpha
- Family: Varanidae
- Genus: Varanus
- Species: V. marathonensis

Binomial name
- Varanus marathonensis Weithofer, 1888

Synonyms
- List: Varanus amnhophilis J. L. Conrad, 2012

= Varanus marathonensis =

Varanus marathonensis Temporal range: Miocene, 12.0–7.0 Ma

Extinct species of lizard

Varanus marathonensis, the Samos dragon, is an extinct species of monitor lizard from the middle to late Miocene of Greece and Spain, known from several specimens. A specimen consisting of a partial skull and several vertebrae was named Varanus amnhophilis in 2012 and placed in its own subgenus, Varaneades, but a 2018 study found it to be a junior synonym of Varanus marathonensis. Comparisons with other species of monitor lizards put its size between 60 and 80 cm (2.0 and 2.6 ft) in length, excluding the tail. The fossil was found in the Turolian-age Mytilini Formation on the island of Samos and is currently housed in the American Museum of Natural History.

== Discovery and naming ==
Varanus marathonensis is known from several specimens. One nearly complete specimen from Cerro de los Batallones, Spain, is currently the most complete fossil of any Varanus species yet discovered.

Specimen from Batallones-3

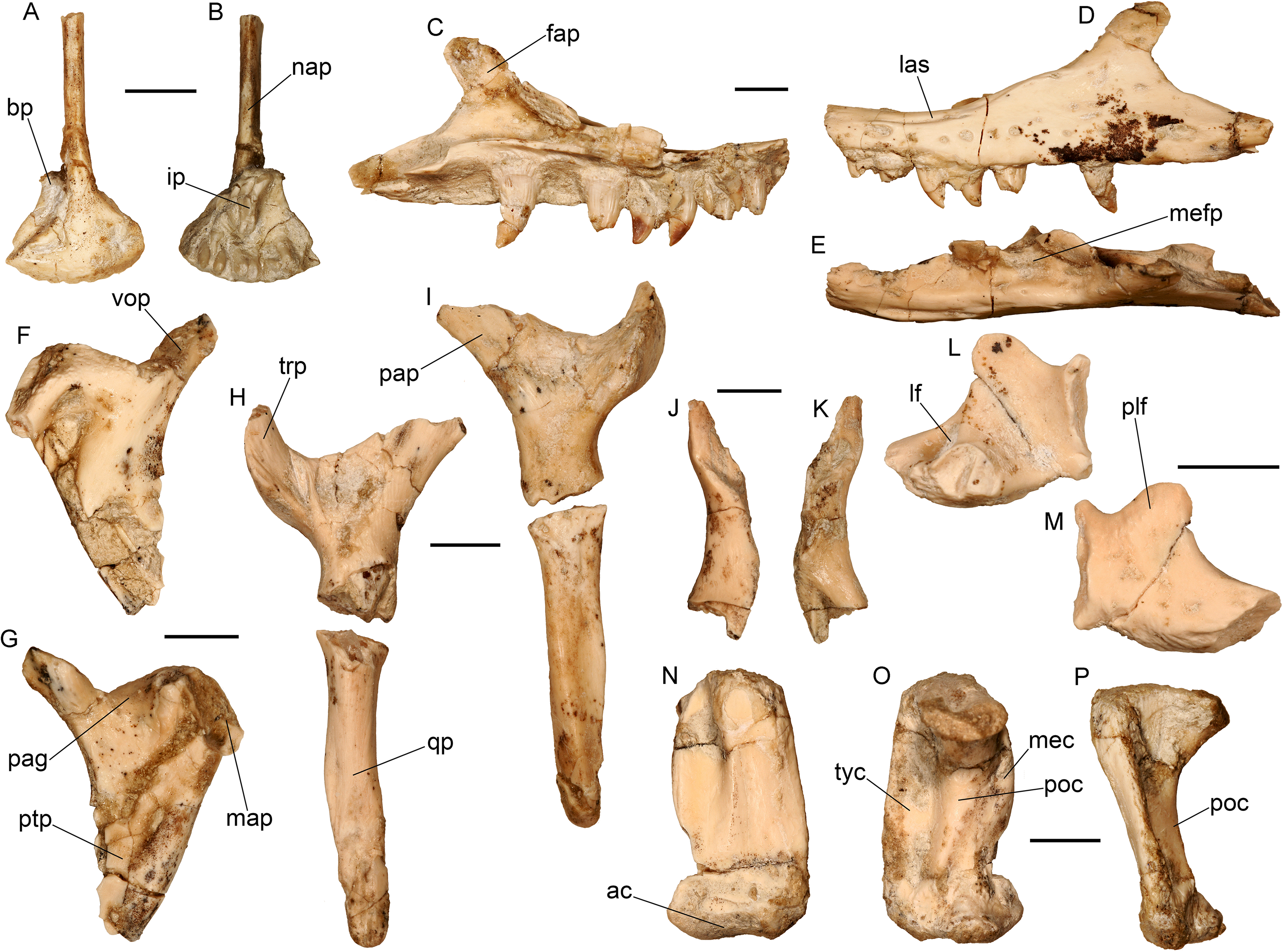
Skull bones

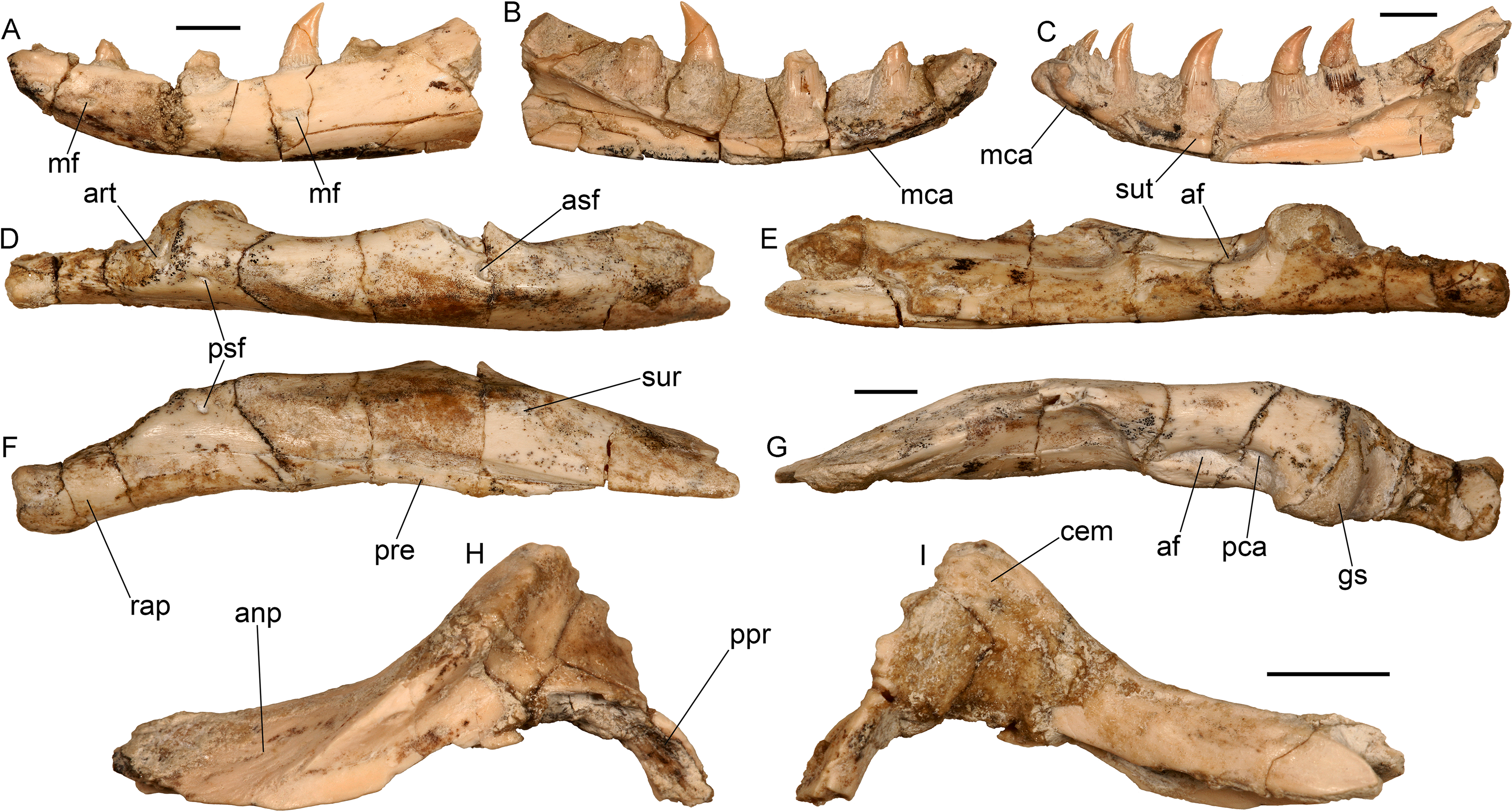
Lower jaw

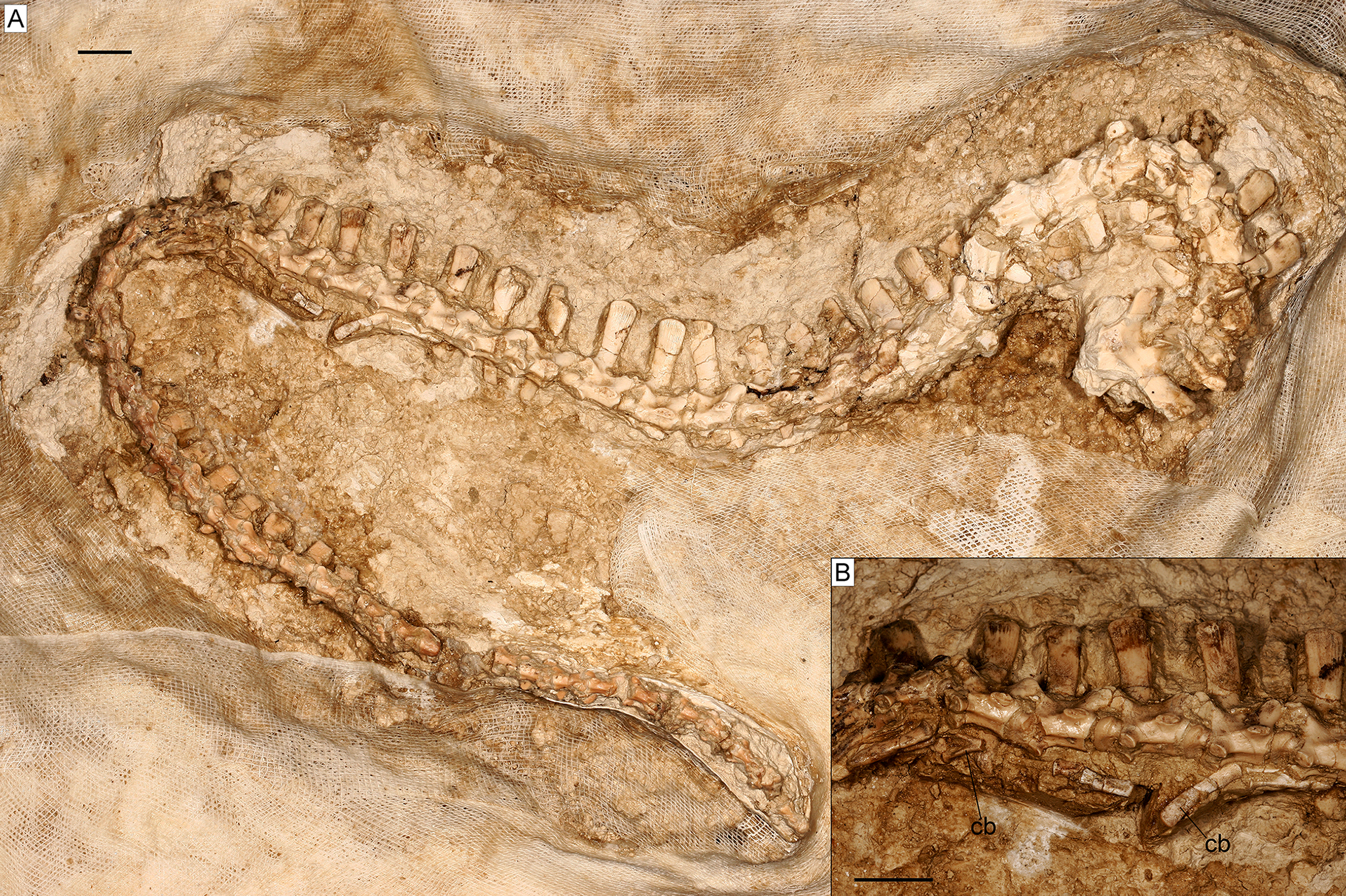
Tail

=== "V. amnhophilis" ===
Another specimen originally described as "V. amnhophilis" is known from several bone fragments, including the right side of the braincase, a right quadrate bone, part of the palate and skull roof, the right coronoid process and glenoid region of the lower jaw, a piece of the clavicle, and five vertebrae.

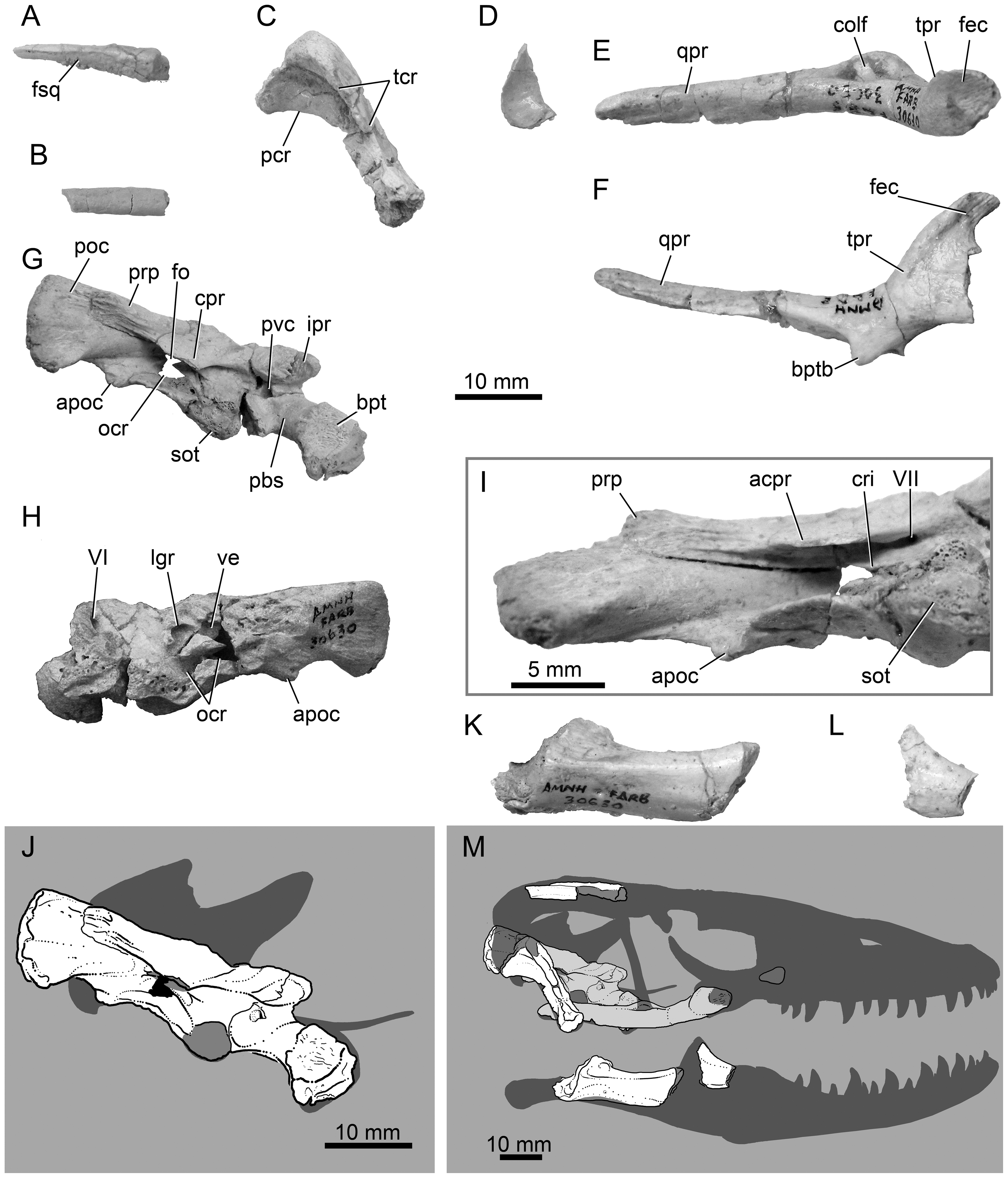
Skull elements of the "V. amnhophilis" holotype.

These bones were found by American paleontologist Barnum Brown, who stored it in the mammal collections of the American Museum of Natural History. The specimen was not identified as a reptile until 2009. Mammal paleontologist Nikos Solounias, who has worked extensively on Samos Island fossils, then brought the fossil to the attention of Carl Mehling. Mehling removed the specimen from the fossil mammal collection and cataloged it as AMNH FR (fossil reptile) 30630.

The specimen was described in 2012 as a new species of Varanus, and was placed in a new subgenus called Varaneades. The species name amnhophilis means 'lover of lamb', from the Greek αμνόζ (amnhos, 'lamb') and φιλiζ (philis, 'a lover of'), as a reference to the diet of the largest living monitor lizards, which often includes sheep-sized (and larger) mammals. The subgenus name Varaneades comes from the genus name Varanus and the Neades, mythical nymphs from Samos.

A subsequent study in 2018, however, found V. amnhophilis to be a junior synonym of V. marathonensis.

== Description ==
=== Size ===
The body length of AMNH FR 30630 was estimated by comparing the length of the braincase and an individual vertebra with their lengths in living species of monitor lizards. The ratios of braincase length to postcranial length and dorsal (back) vertebra length to precaudal length are very similar for many monitor species, and were used to estimate the precaudal length of V. amnhophilis. The first ratio gave an estimated precaudal length of about 71.26 cm (2.338 ft) and the second gave a length of about 66.45 cm (2.180 ft).

== Gallery ==
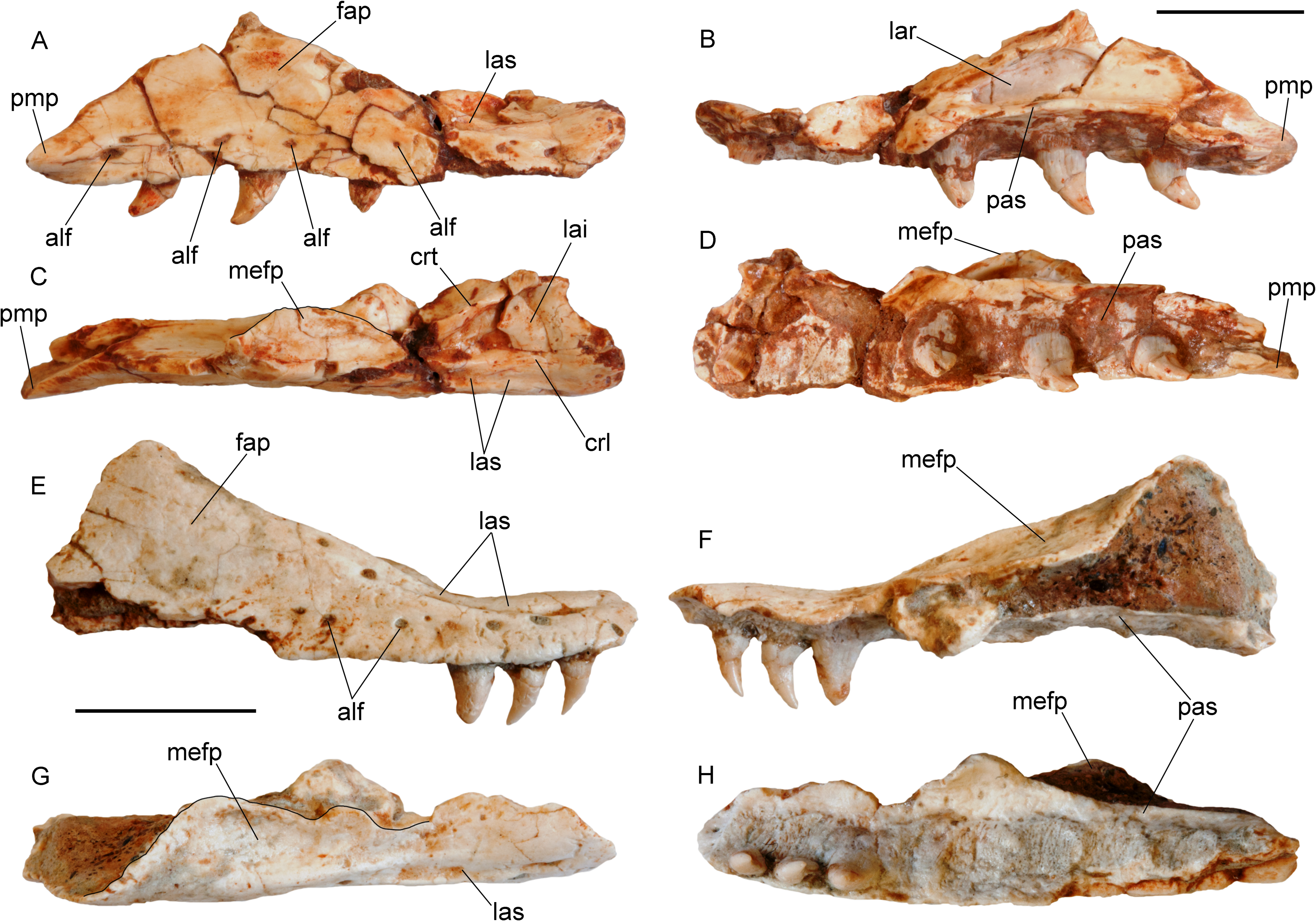
Maxilla

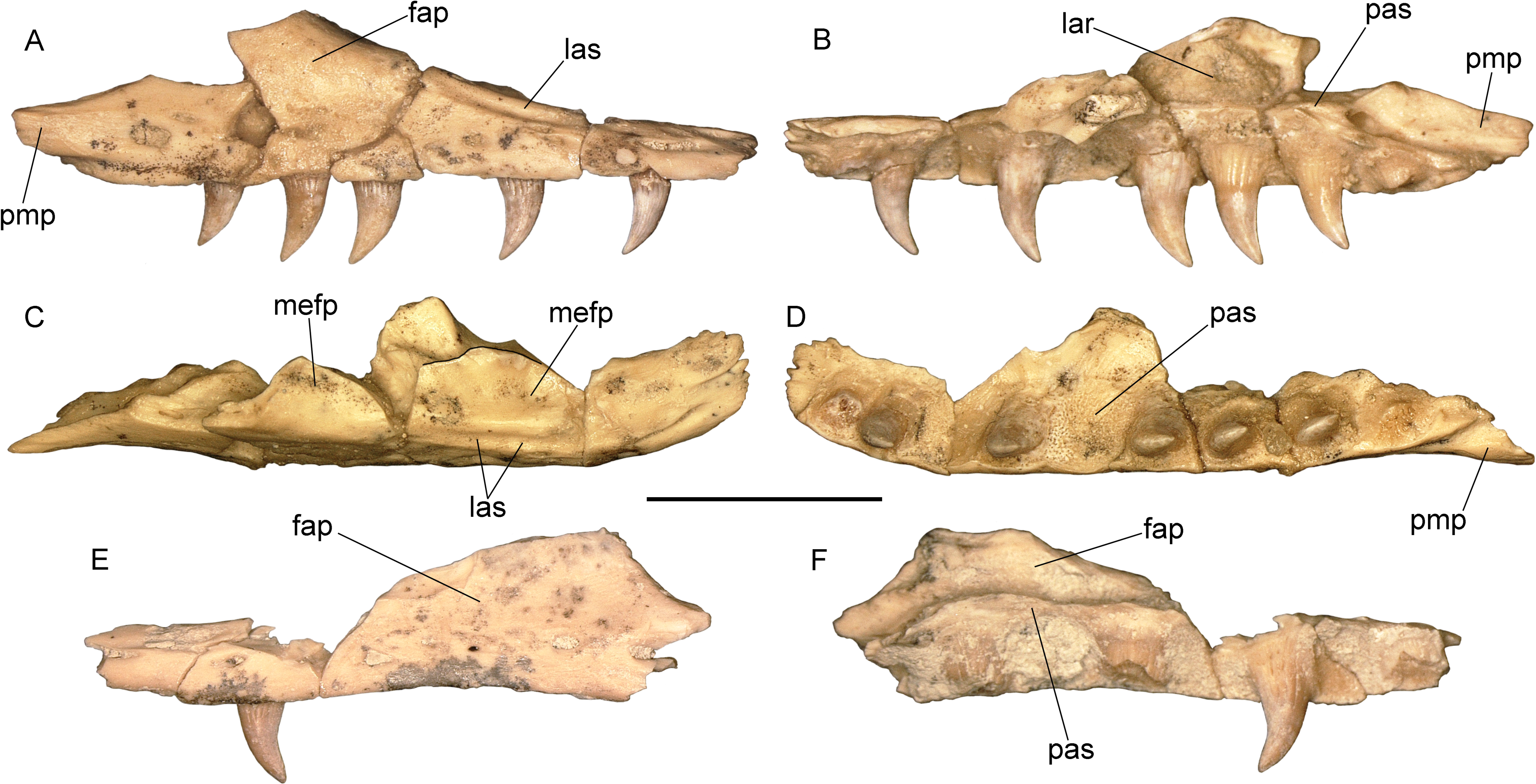
Maxilla

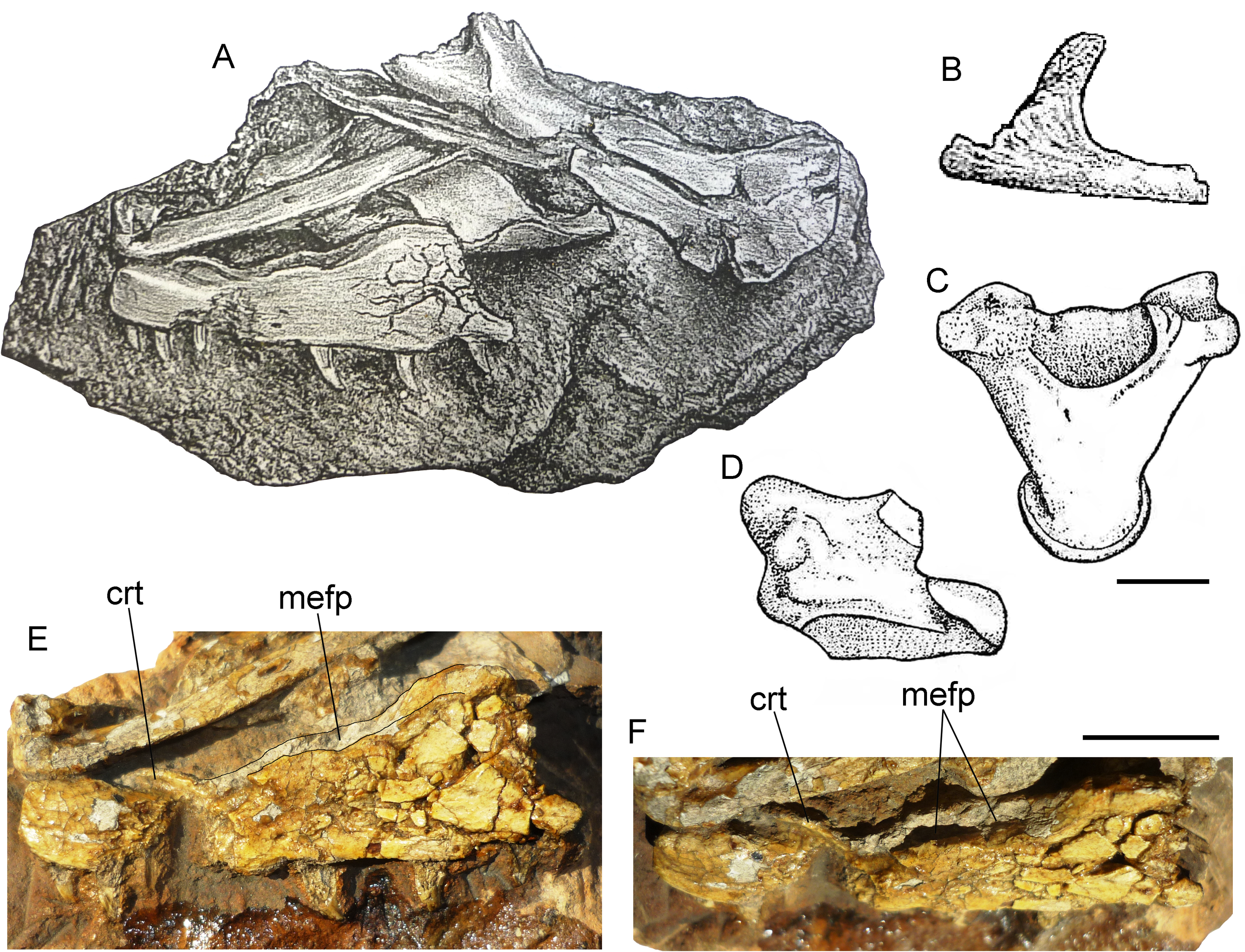
Skull bones
