= Skenidioides =

Scientific classification
- Kingdom: Animalia
- Phylum: Brachiopoda
- Class: Rhynchonellata
- Order: †Protorthida
- Family: †Skenidiidae
- Genus: †Skenidioides; Schuchert & Cooper, 1931

Genus of brachiopods (fossil)

Skenidioides is an extinct genus of brachiopods which existed during the Ordovician, Silurian, and Devonian of what is now Australia, Canada, China, the Czech Republic, Italy, Morocco, Poland, Ukraine, the United States, Belarus, Estonia, Lithuania, Mexico, Norway, Sweden, the United Kingdom, Venezuela, Ireland, Kazakhstan, the Russian Federation, and Argentina. It was described by Schuchert and Cooper in 1931, and the type species is S. billingsi. A new species, S. tatyanae, was described by Andrzej Baliński in 2012, from the early Devonian of Ukraine. The species epithet refers to Tatyana Lvovna Modzalevskaya.

== Species ==
- Skenidioides billingsi Schuchert & Cooper, 1931
- Skenidioides cretus Halamski in Baliński, Racki & Halamski, 2016
- Skenidioides kayseri Benedetto, 2003
- Skenidioides anthonense
- Skenidioides tatyanae Baliński, 2012
