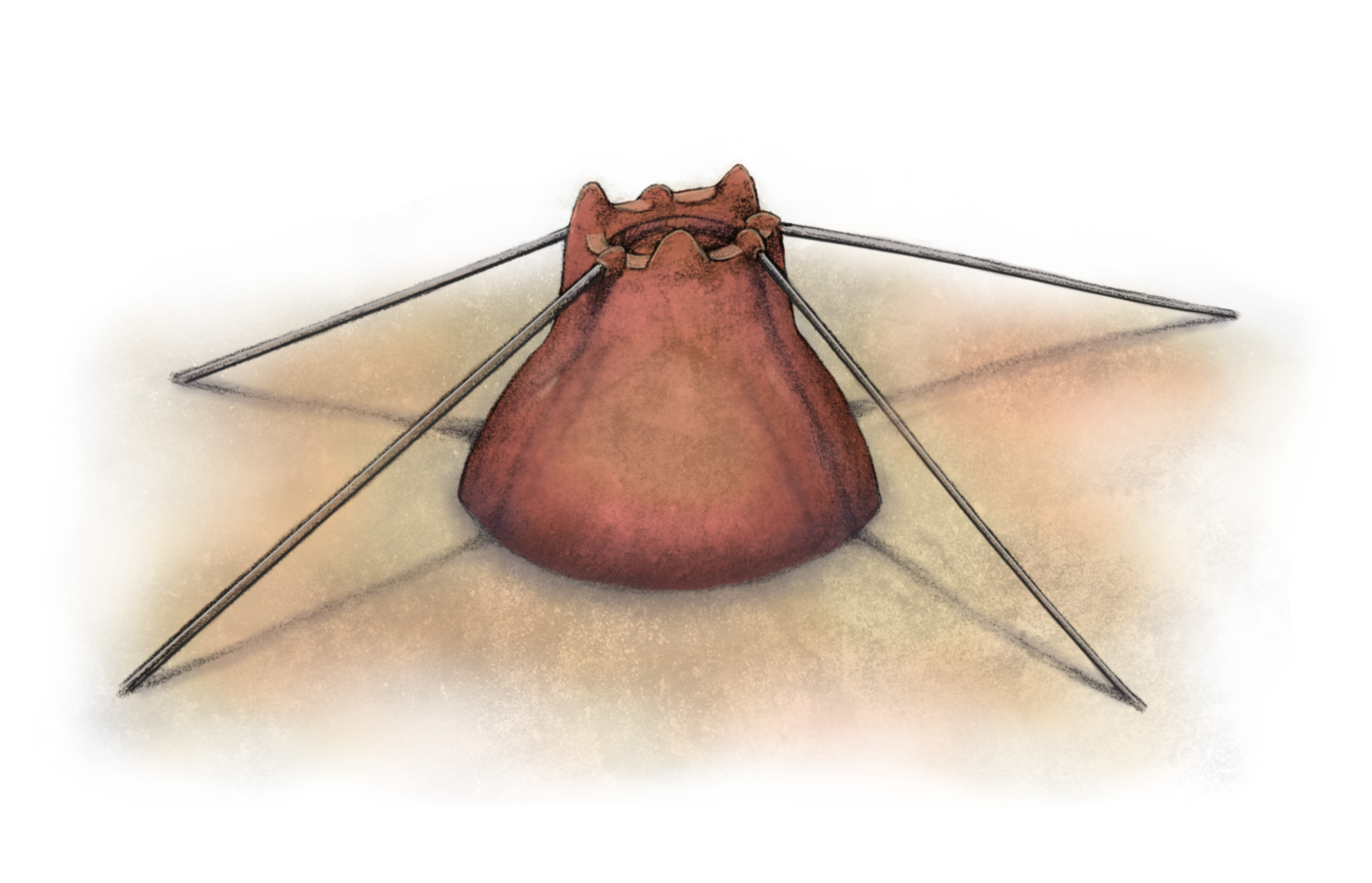
- Artist restoration of Coronacollina acula

Scientific classification
- Kingdom: Animalia
- Phylum: incertae sedis
- Genus: Coronacollina Clites et al., 2012
- Species: C. acula

Binomial name
- Coronacollina acula Clites et al., 2012

= Coronacollina acula =

Coronacollina acula Temporal range: Ediacaran 555 Ma

Species of sponge (fossil)

Coronacollina acula is an extinct species of multicellular organism from the Ediacaran period resembling the Cambrian 'sponge' Choia. The organism comprised a raised, tri-radially-symmetrical central mound with a central depression and resistant spicules (up to four in articulated fossils), which were resistant — either chitinous or biomineralized — and grew to be 37 cm long. It is currently the oldest known animal with a hard skeleton.
