= Plectambonitoidea =

Scientific classification
- Kingdom: Animalia
- Phylum: Brachiopoda
- Class: †Strophomenata
- Order: †Strophomenida
- Superfamily: †Plectambonitoidea

Families
- see text

Extinct suborder of marine lamp shells

Plectambonitoidea is a suborder of brachiopods containing the families:

- Family Plectambonitidae
- Family Taffiidae
- Family Bimuriidae
- Family Syndielasmatidae
- Family Leptellinidae
- Family Grorudiidae
- Family Leptestiidae
- Family Xenambonitidae
- Family Hesperomenidae
- Family Sowerbyellidae
