= Lunostoma =

Lunostoma Temporal range: Middle Devonian

Scientific classification
- Kingdom: Animalia
- Phylum: Bryozoa
- Class: Stenolaemata
- Order: †Cryptostomida
- Family: †Rhabdomesidae
- Genus: †Lunostoma; Ernst, Taylor, Bohatý & Wyse Jackson, 2011
- Species: †L. pulchra

Binomial name
- †Lunostoma pulchra Ernst, Taylor, Bohatý & Wyse Jackson, 2011

Extinct genus of moss animals

Lunostoma is an extinct genus of bryozoans which existed during the middle Devonian of what is now Germany, precisely from the Gerolstein syncline. It was described by Andrej Ernst, Paul D. Taylor, Jan Bohatý and Patrick N. Wyse Jackson in 2012, and the type species is Lunostoma pulchra.

== Morphology ==
Lunostoma was a small animal, branches being about 1.3 mm wide. It is unique among Rhabdomesina bryozoans in featuring "scutes", crescent-shaped structures on the proximal side of apertures. The function of these structures, which resemble the lunaria of cystoporate bryozoans, is unclear, and it is possibly an example of convergent evolution. Otherwise it is similar to Saffordotaxis.
