= Staurotypus moschus =

Staurotypus moschus Temporal range: Miocene

Scientific classification
- Kingdom: Animalia
- Phylum: Chordata
- Class: Reptilia
- Order: Testudines
- Suborder: Cryptodira
- Family: Kinosternidae
- Genus: Staurotypus
- Species: S. moschus

Binomial name
- Staurotypus moschus Cadena et al., 2012

Extinct species of turtle

Staurotypus moschus is an extinct species of Staurotypus that lived during the Miocene epoch.

== Distribution ==
Staurotypus moschus is known from the Cucaracha Formation of Panama.
