= Plectodonta =

Scientific classification
- Kingdom: Animalia
- Phylum: Brachiopoda
- Class: †Strophomenata
- Order: †Strophomenida
- Family: †Sowerbyellidae
- Genus: †Plectodonta; Kozlowski, 1929

Extinct genus of brachiopods

Plectodonta is an extinct genus of brachiopods which existed during the Devonian to Silurian of the United States, Australia, Canada, China, the Czech Republic, Czechoslovakia, Germany, Kazakhstan, Morocco, Poland, Spain, Ukraine, Argentina, Bolivia, Sweden, the United Kingdom, and Venezuela. It was described by Kozlowski in 1929, and the type species is P. mariae. A new extinct subspecies, P. mariae pantherae, was described by Andrzej Baliński in 2012, from the early Devonian of Ukraine.

== Species ==
- Plectodonta bipartita Chapman, 1913
- Plectodonta mariae Kozlowski, 1929
  - Plectodonta mariae pantherae Baliński, 2012
- Plectodonta biplex
- Plectodonta minor
- Plectodonta millinensis
- Plectodonta heterosinus
- Plectodonta mimica (Barrande 1879)
- Plectodonta minima
- Plectodonta orientalis
- Plectodonta comitans
- Plectodonta subcomitans
- Plectodonta transversalis
- Plectodonta bidecorata
