= Cyclothyris =

Cyclothyris Temporal range: Cretaceous

Scientific classification
- Kingdom: Animalia
- Phylum: Brachiopoda
- Class: Rhynchonellata
- Order: Rhynchonellida
- Family: †Rhynchonellidae
- Genus: †Cyclothyris; M'Coy, 1844

Species
- See text

Extinct genus of brachiopods

Cyclothyris is an extinct genus of brachiopods from the Cretaceous of Africa, Asia, Europe, and North America.

== Species ==
Species within this genus include:

- †Cyclothyris acuticostalis Smirnova and Konovalov, 1986
- †Cyclothyris africana Owen, 1980
- †Cyclothyris aliformis Smirnova, 2012
- †Cyclothyris alikentica Smirnova, 2012
- †Cyclothyris americana Cooper, 1955
- †Cyclothyris astieriana d,Orbigny, 1847
- †Cyclothyris bitririca Baeza-Carratalá et al., 2023
- †Cyclothyris burgemakensis Smirnova, 2012
- †Cyclothyris cardiatelia Berrocal-Casero, 2020
- †Cyclothyris compressa Valenciennes, 1819
- †Cyclothyris dagestanica Smirnova, 2012
- †Cyclothyris densleonis Anderson, 1902
- †Cyclothyris difformis Valenciennes, 1819
- †Cyclothyris ementitum Berrocal-Casero et al., 2023
- †Cyclothyris elegans
- †Cyclothyris formosa Owen, 1988
- †Cyclothyris gibbsiana Sowerby, 1829
- †Cyclothyris globata Arnaud, 1877
- †Cyclothyris juigneti Owen, 1988
- †Cyclothyris kennedyi Owen, 1980
- †Cyclothyris lamarckiana d'Orbigny, 1849
- †Cyclothyris larwoodi Owen, 1959
- †Cyclothyris latissima Sowerby, 1829
- †Cyclothyris punfieldensis Owen, 1988
- †Cyclothyris segurai Berrocal-Casero, 2020
- †Cyclothyris subtrigonalis Imlay, 1937
- †Cyclothyris sutchanensis Smirnova and Konovalov, 1986
- †Cyclothyris tenuicostata Smirnova, 2012
- †Cyclothyris ulaganica Makridin, 1964
- †Cyclothyris vespertilio Brocchi, 1814
- †Cyclothyris zudakharica Smirnova, 2012
