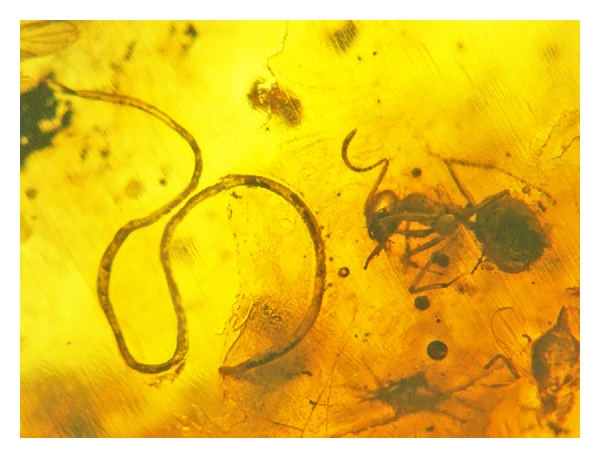
- Heydenius formicinus adjacent to its worker ant host in Baltic amber

Scientific classification
- Domain: Eukaryota
- Kingdom: Animalia
- Phylum: Nematoda
- Class: Enoplea
- Order: Mermithida
- Family: Mermithidae
- Genus: †Heydenius; Taylor, 1935

Species
- See text

= Heydenius =

Heydenius Temporal range: Tertiary

Extinct genus of roundworms

Heydenius is a collective group genus of fossil mermithid nematodes from the Tertiary period that cannot be placed in extant genera.

== Species ==
Scientific name	Age	Type locality	Country	Host	Notes
Heydenius antiquus (von Heyden, 1860) Taylor, 1935	Oligocene/Miocene	Rhine lignite	Germany	Hesthesis immortua von Heyden, 1862 (Coleoptera, Cerambycidae)	Originally named Mermis antiqua von Heyden, 1860.
Heydenius arachnius Poinar, 2012	Miocene	Dominican amber	Dominican Republic	Araneae	
Heydenius araneus Poinar, 2000	Eocene	Baltic amber	Russia (Kaliningrad Oblast)	Araneae, Thomisidae	
Heydenius brownii Poinar, 2001	Eocene	Baltic amber	Russia (Kaliningrad Oblast)	Hemiptera, Achilidae	
Heydenius cecidomyae Poinar, 2011	Eocene	Baltic amber	Russia (Kaliningrad Oblast)	Diptera, Cecidomyiidae	
Heydenius dipterophilus Poinar, 2011	Miocene	Dominican amber	Dominican Republic	Diptera, Milichiidae	
Heydenius dominicus Poinar, 1984	Miocene	Dominican amber	Dominican Republic	Culex (Diptera, Culicidae)	
Heydenius formicinus Poinar, 2002	Eocene	Baltic amber	Russia (Kaliningrad Oblast)	Prenolepis henschei Mayr, 1868 (Hymenoptera, Formicidae)	
Heydenius lamprophilus Poinar, 2011	Miocene	Dominican amber	Dominican Republic	Coleoptera, Lampyridae	
Heydenius matutinus (Menge, 1866) Taylor, 1935	Eocene	Baltic amber	Russia (Kaliningrad Oblast)	Diptera, Chironomidae	Originally named Mermis matutina Menge, 1866.
Heydenius myrmecophila Poinar, Lachaud, Castillo & Infante, 2006	Miocene	Dominican amber	Dominican Republic	Linepithema (Hymenoptera: Formicidae)	
Heydenius neotropicus Poinar, 2011	Miocene	Dominican amber	Dominican Republic	Diptera, Chironomidae	
Heydenius phasmatophilus Poinar, 2012	Eocene	Baltic amber	Russia (Kaliningrad Oblast)	Balticophasma (Phasmatodea: Phasmatidae)	
Heydenius podenasae Poinar, 2012	Eocene	Baltic amber	Russia (Kaliningrad Oblast)	Lepidoptera	
Heydenius psychodae Poinar, 2011	Miocene	Dominican amber	Dominican Republic	Diptera, Psychodidae	
Heydenius quadristriatus (Menge, 1872) Taylor, 1935	Eocene	Baltic amber	Russia (Kaliningrad Oblast)	Unknown	Originally named Mermis quadristriata Menge, 1872.
Heydenius saprophilus Poinar, 2011	Miocene	Dominican amber	Dominican Republic	Diptera, Anisopodidae	
Heydenius scatophilus Poinar, 2011	Miocene	Dominican amber	Dominican Republic	Diptera, Scatopsidae	
Heydenius sciarophilus Poinar, 2011	Eocene	Baltic amber	Russia (Kaliningrad Oblast)	Diptera, Sciaridae	
Heydenius simulphilus Poinar & Currie, 2019	Eocene	Baltic amber	Russia (Kaliningrad Oblast)	Diptera, Simuliidae	
Heydenius tabanae Poinar, 2011	Late Pliocene (Piacenzian)	Willershausen clay pit	Germany	Tabanus sudeticus Zeller, 1842 (Diptera, Tabanidae)	
Heydenius trichorosus Poinar, 2012	Eocene	Baltic amber	Russia (Kaliningrad Oblast)	Triaenodes balticus Wichard & Barnard, 2005 (Trichoptera, Leptoceridae)	

== See also ==
- Cretacimermis
