= Periodon =

Periodon Temporal range: Ordovician

Scientific classification
- Kingdom: Animalia
- Phylum: Chordata
- Infraphylum: Agnatha
- Class: †Conodonta
- Family: †Periodontidae
- Genus: †Periodon; Hadding, 1913

Genus of jawless fishes

Periodon is a genus of conodonts which existed in what is now Canada, Iran, Argentina, China, Russia, and the United States during the Ordovician Period. It was described by Hadding in 1913, and the type species is P. aculeatus.

== Species ==
- Periodon flabellum Lindström, 1954
- Periodon zgierzensis Dzik, 1976
- Periodon aculeatus Hadding, 1913
- Periodon selenopsis Serpagli, 1974
- Periodon macrodentatus (Graves & Ellison 1941)
- Periodon hankensis Svend Stouge, 2012
