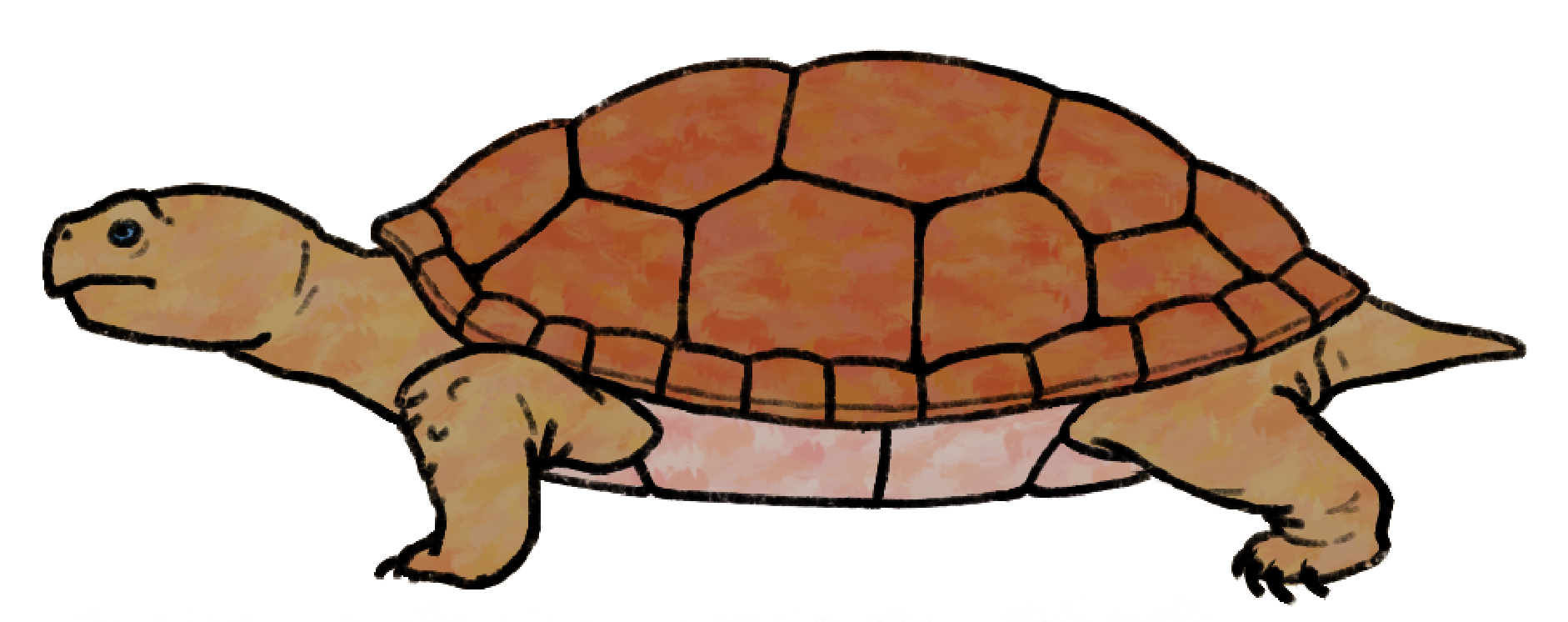
- Bashuchelys reconstruction.

Scientific classification
- Domain: Eukaryota
- Kingdom: Animalia
- Phylum: Chordata
- Class: Reptilia
- Order: Testudines
- Suborder: Cryptodira
- Family: †Bashuchelyidae; Tong et al., 2011
- Genus: †Bashuchelys; Tong et al., 2011

= Bashuchelys =

Bashuchelys Temporal range: Middle Jurassic

Extinct genus of turtles

Bashuchelys is an extinct genus of bashuchelyid Middle Jurassic turtle from the Sichuan Basin in the People's Republic of China. As of 2011, it is the only known genus of the family Bashuchelyidae.
