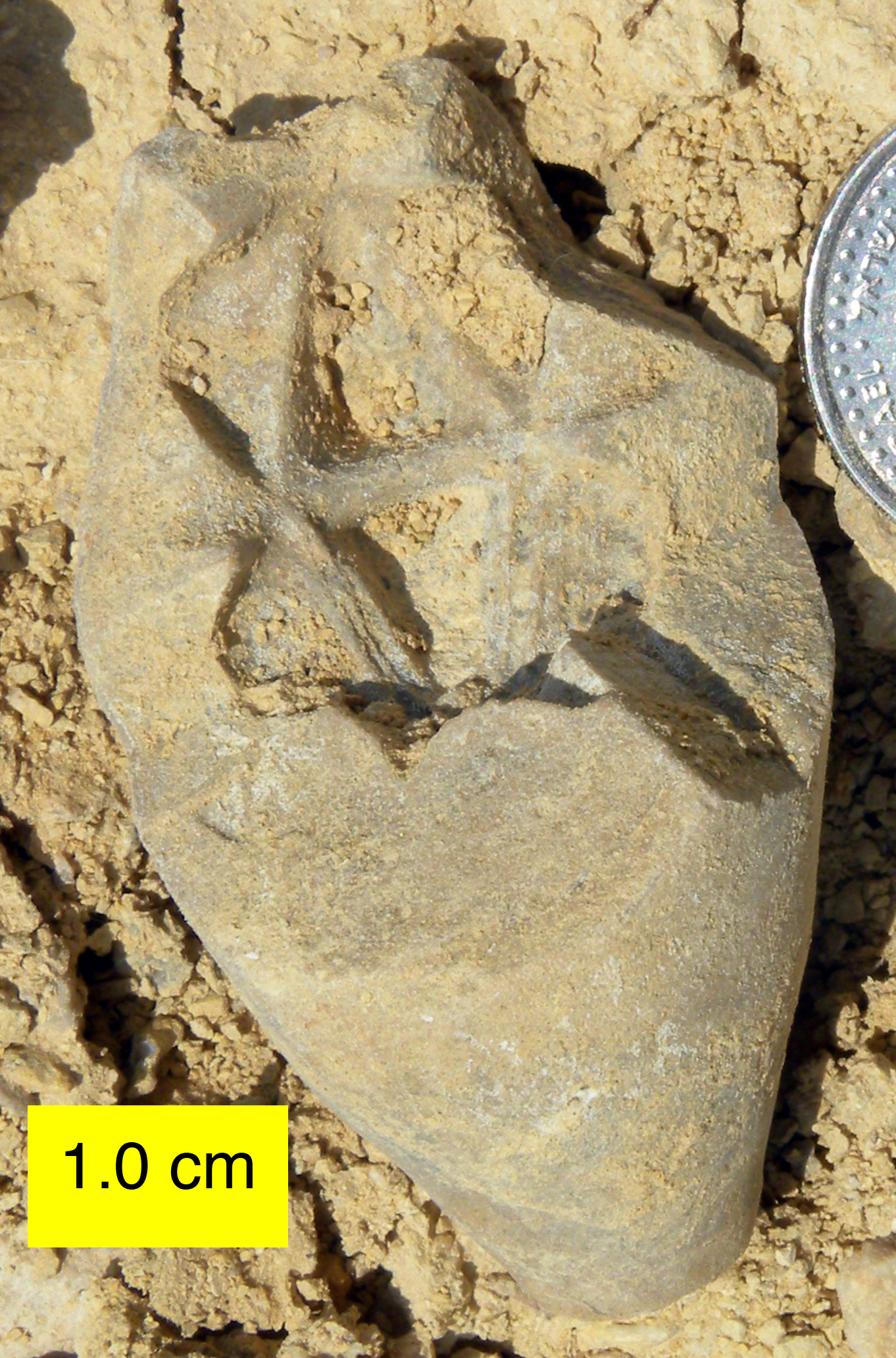
- Apiocrinites negevensis Ausich and Wilson, 2012, Matmor Formation, Jurassic, Israel.

Scientific classification
- Kingdom: Animalia
- Phylum: Echinodermata
- Class: Crinoidea
- Order: Millericrinida
- Genus: †Apiocrinites

= Apiocrinites =

Apiocrinites Temporal range: Middle - Late Jurassic

Extinct genus of crinoids

Apiocrinites (from Greek: ἄπιον apion, 'pear' and Greek: κρίνω krino 'to perceive') is an extinct genus of crinoid that lived from the Middle to the Late Jurassic of Asia and Europe.

== Sources ==
- William I. Ausich and Mark A. Wilson (2012). "New Tethyan Apiocrinitidae (Crinoidea, Articulata) from the Jurassic of Israel". Journal of Paleontology 86 (6): 1051–1055. doi:10.1666/12-049R.1
