= Trematosuchoides =

Scientific classification
- Domain: Eukaryota
- Kingdom: Animalia
- Phylum: Chordata
- Order: †Temnospondyli
- Suborder: †Stereospondyli
- Family: †Trematosauridae
- Genus: †Trematosuchoides

Extinct genus of amphibians

Trematosuchoides is an extinct genus of trematosaurid temnospondyl.
