= Alexandrovsky District, Orenburg Oblast =

Alexandrovsky District Александровский район (Russian)
- District
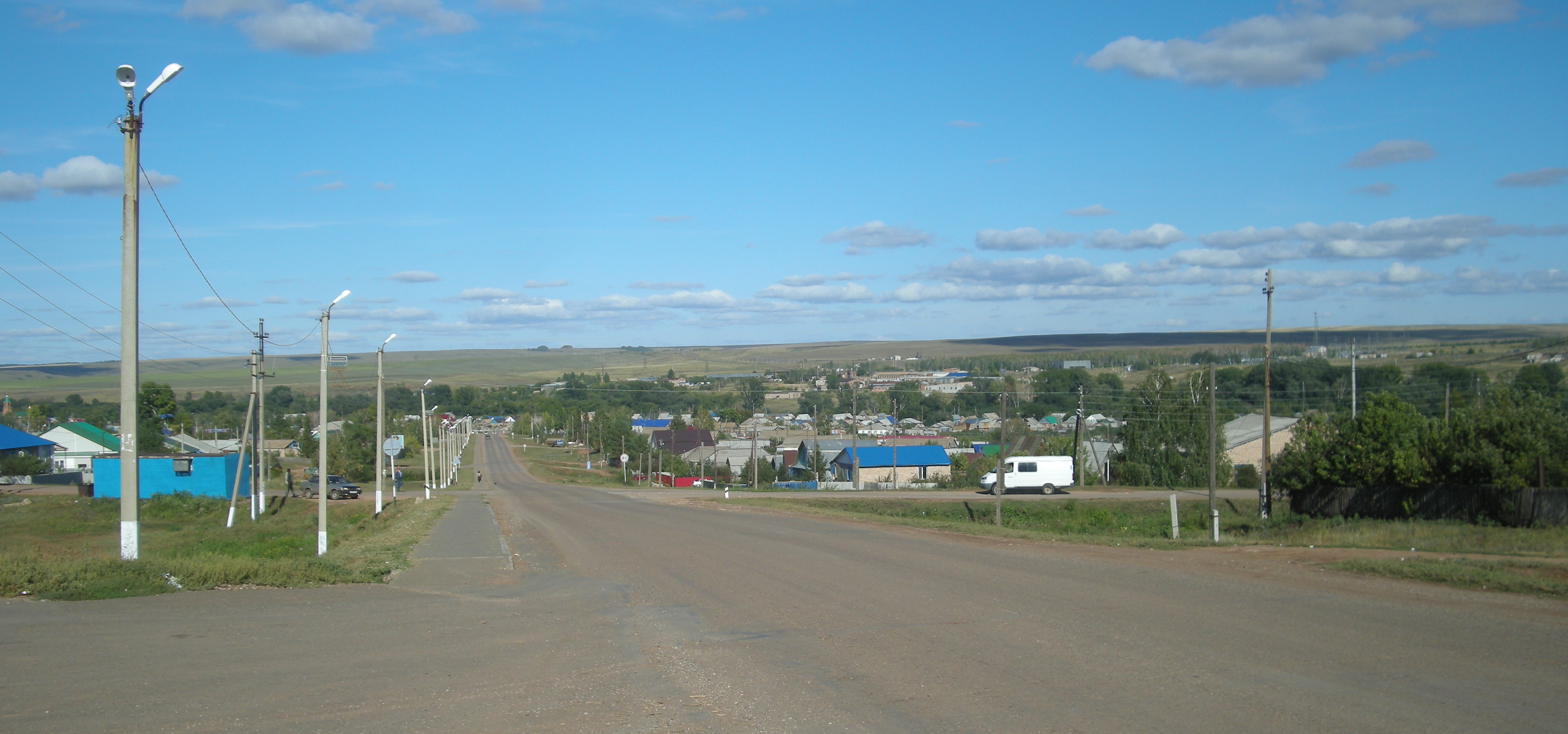
- Alexandrovka, Alexandrovsky District

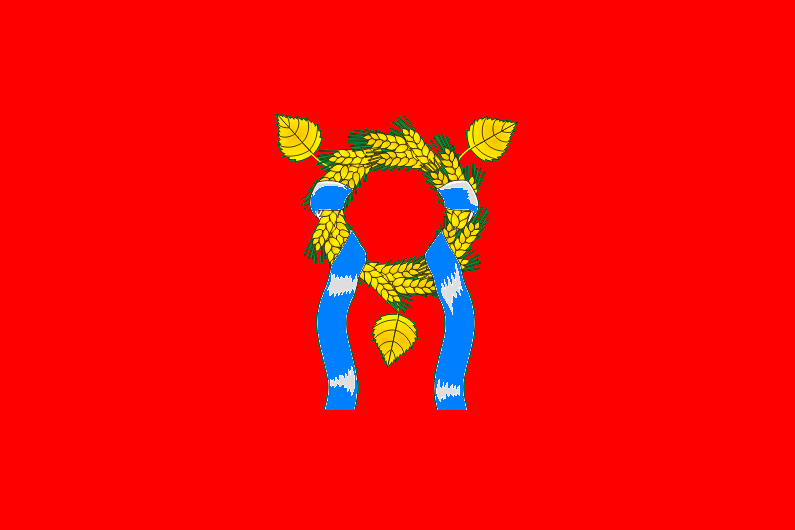
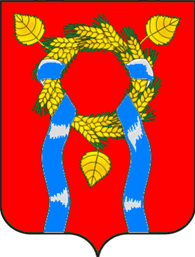
- Flag Coat of arms
- Location of Alexandrovsky District in Orenburg Oblast
- Coordinates: 52°40′45″N 54°24′56″E
- Country: Russia
- Federal subject: Orenburg Oblast
- Established: 1935
- Administrative center: Alexandrovka

Area
  - Total: 3,100 km^{2} (1,200 sq mi)

Population (2010 Census)
  - Total: 15,702
  - Density: 5.1/km^{2} (13/sq mi)
  - Urban: 0%
  - Rural: 100%

Administrative structure
  - Administrative divisions: 14 selsoviet
  - Inhabited localities: 54 rural localities

Municipal structure
  - Municipally incorporated as: Alexandrovsky Municipal District
  - Municipal divisions: 0 urban settlements, 14 rural settlements
- Time zone: UTC+5 (MSK+2)
- OKTMO ID: 53606000
- Website: http://www.aleksandrovka56.ru/

Alexandrovsky District (Russian: Алекса́ндровский райо́н) is an administrative and municipal district (raion), one of the thirty-five in Orenburg Oblast, Russia. It is located in the west of the oblast. The area of the district is 3,100 square kilometers (1,200 sq mi). Its administrative center is the rural locality (a selo) of Alexandrovka. Population: 15,702 (2010 Census); 19,962 (2002 census); 22,329 (1989 Soviet census). The population of Alexandrovka accounts for 25.4% of the total district's population.
