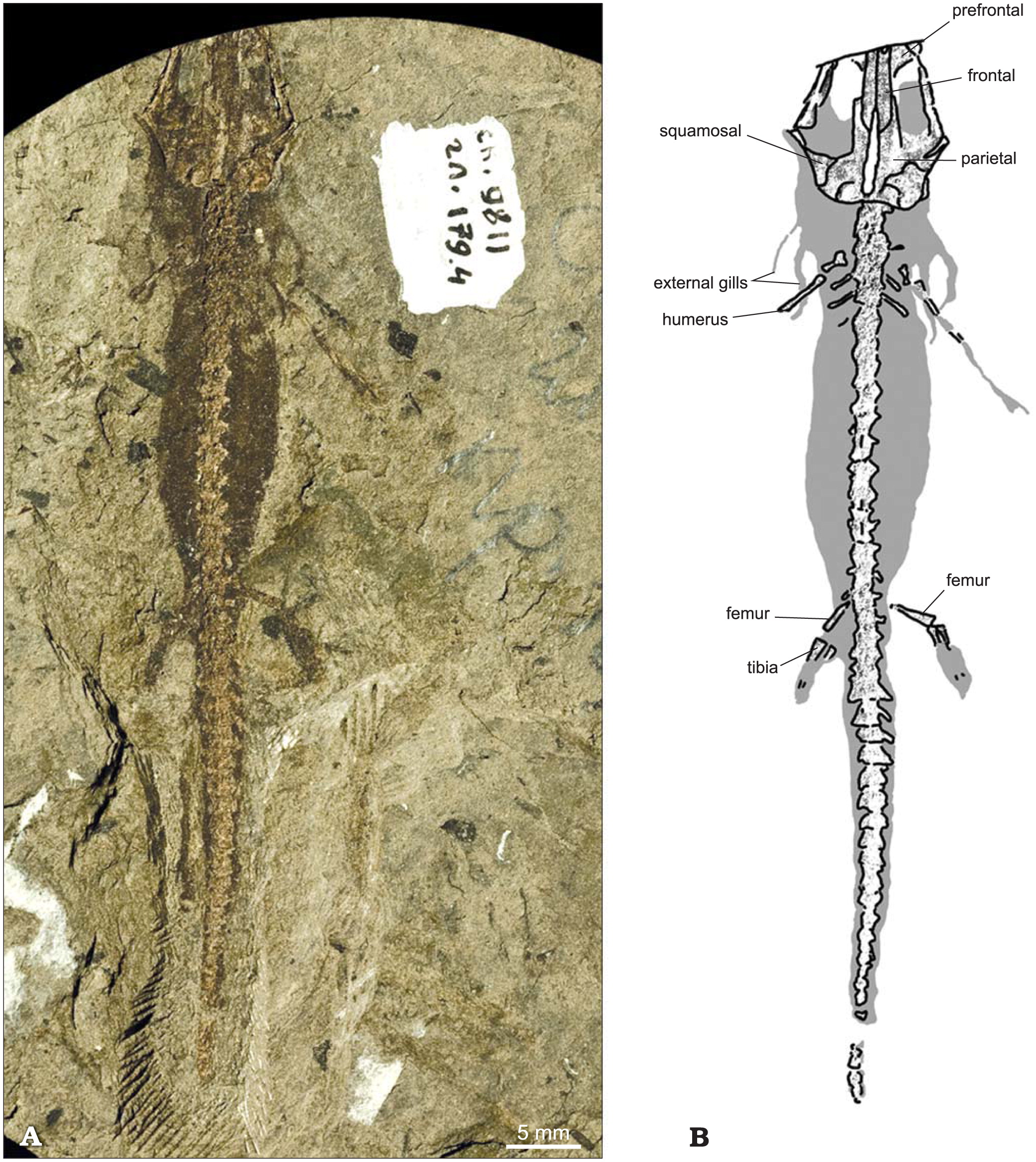
- A fossil with soft tissue impressions interpreted at right

Scientific classification
- Kingdom: Animalia
- Phylum: Chordata
- Class: Amphibia
- Order: Urodela
- Genus: †Seminobatrachus; Skutschas & Gubin, 2011

Species
- †S. boltyschkensis Skutschas & Gubin, 2011 (type)

= Seminobatrachus =

Seminobatrachus Temporal range: Thanetian - Ypresian, 57–54 Ma

Extinct genus of salamanders

Seminobatrachus is an extinct genus of neotenic salamander from late Paleocene to early Eocene deposits of Cherkassy Region, central Ukraine. It is known from 14 skeletons from a drill hole near Boltyshka village. It was first named by Pavel P. Skutschas and Yuri M. Gubin in 2011 and the type species is Seminobatrachus boltyschkensis.
