= Gracianella =

Scientific classification
- Kingdom: Animalia
- Phylum: Brachiopoda
- Class: Rhynchonellata
- Order: †Atrypida
- Family: †Atrypinidae
- Genus: †Gracianella; Johnson & Boucot, 1967

Genus of fossil brachiopods

Gracianella is a genus of fossil brachiopods. It was described by Johnson and Boucot in 1967, and existed from the Silurian to the Devonian of Australia, Austria, Canada, China, the Czech Republic, Italy, Tajikistan, and the United States. A new species, G. paulula, was described by Andrzej Baliński in 2012, from the early Devonian of Ukraine.
