= Terrapene parornata =

Terrapene parornata Temporal range: Neogene

Scientific classification
- Domain: Eukaryota
- Kingdom: Animalia
- Phylum: Chordata
- Class: Reptilia
- Order: Testudines
- Suborder: Cryptodira
- Superfamily: Testudinoidea
- Family: Emydidae
- Genus: Terrapene
- Species: †T. parornata

Binomial name
- †Terrapene parornata Joyce at. al., 2012

Extinct species of reptile

Terrapene parornata is an extinct species of Terrapene that lived in Oklahoma during the Neogene period.
