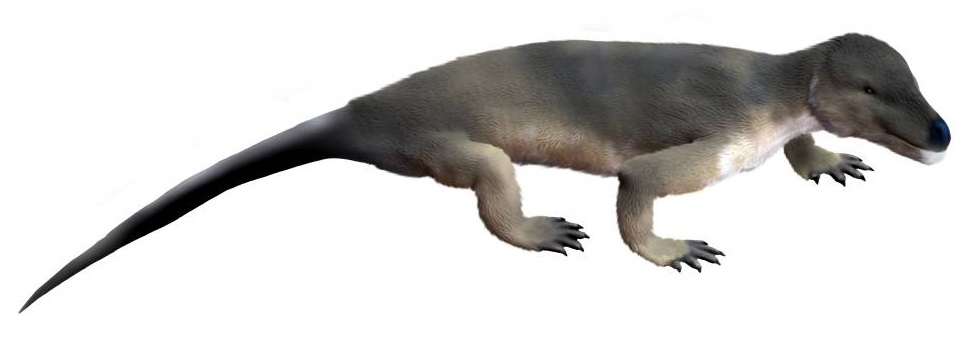
- Procynosuchus delaharpeae from the Late Permian of South Africa

Scientific classification
- Kingdom: Animalia
- Phylum: Chordata
- Clade: Synapsida
- Clade: Therapsida
- Clade: Cynodontia
- Family: †Procynosuchidae; Broom, 1938

Genera
- †Procynosuchus; †Sludica; †Uralocynodon

= Procynosuchidae =

Procynosuchids Temporal range: Late Permian, 260–251.9 Ma

Extinct family of cynodonts

Procynosuchidae is an extinct family of therapsids which, along with Dviniidae, were the earliest cynodonts. They appeared around 260 million years ago, and were most abundant during the latest Permian time (251 mya), shortly before the Permian-Triassic extinction event. Despite being the basal member of the cynodont clade, they already showed some of the advanced mammalian characteristics, but procynosuchids bore resemblance to the therocephalians.

Procynosuchid eyes were forward-facing, and the dentary was larger than the therocephalians. The procynosuchids had a secondary palate, which allows them to eat food while breathing, just like mammals. The procynosuchids became extinct at the Permian-Triassic extinction event. Some procynosuchids were terrestrial, but others like Procynosuchus were semi-aquatic.
