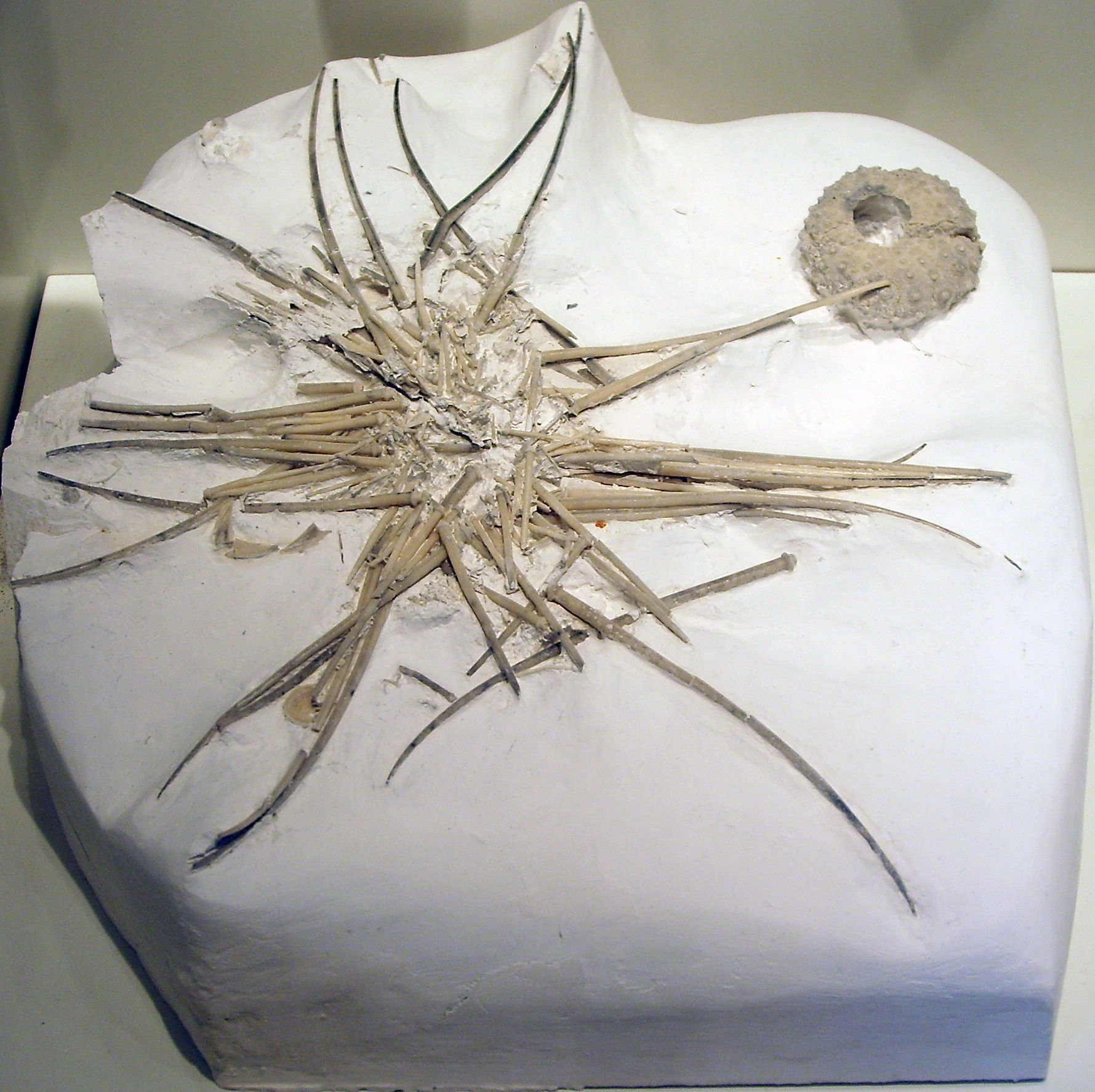
- Phymosoma granulosum fossil, Geological museum, Copenhagen

Scientific classification
- Kingdom: Animalia
- Phylum: Echinodermata
- Class: Echinoidea
- Order: †Phymosomatoida
- Family: †Phymosomatidae
- Genus: †Phymosoma; Haime in d'Archiac & Haime, 1853

= Phymosoma =

Phymosoma Temporal range: Cretaceous-Eocene

Extinct genus of sea urchins

Phymosoma is an extinct genus of echinoids that lived from the Cretaceous to the Eocene. Its remains have been found in Asia, Europe, and North America.

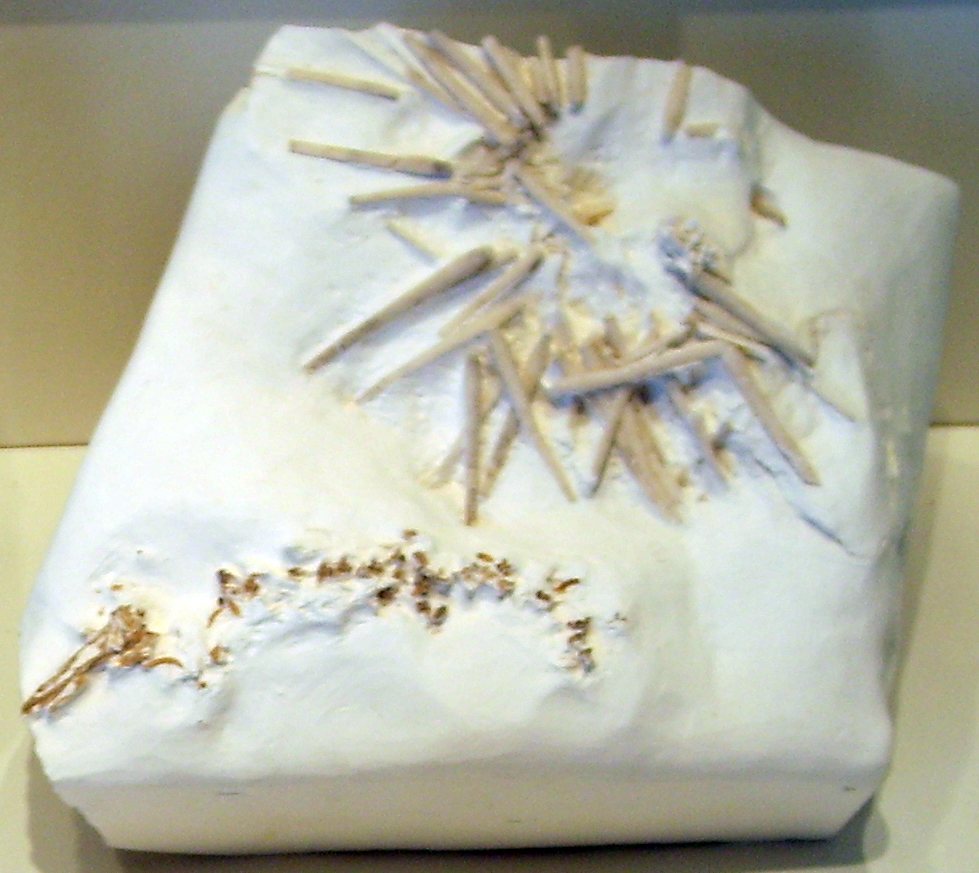
Syngnathid and Phymosoma granulosum fossils at the Geological Museum in Copenhagen

== Sources ==
- Fossils (Smithsonian Handbooks) by David Ward (Page 179)
