= Chasmatopora =

Scientific classification
- Kingdom: Animalia
- Phylum: Bryozoa
- Class: Stenolaemata
- Order: †Fenestrida
- Family: †Chasmatoporidae
- Genus: †Chasmatopora d'Orbigny, 1849

Extinct genus of moss animals

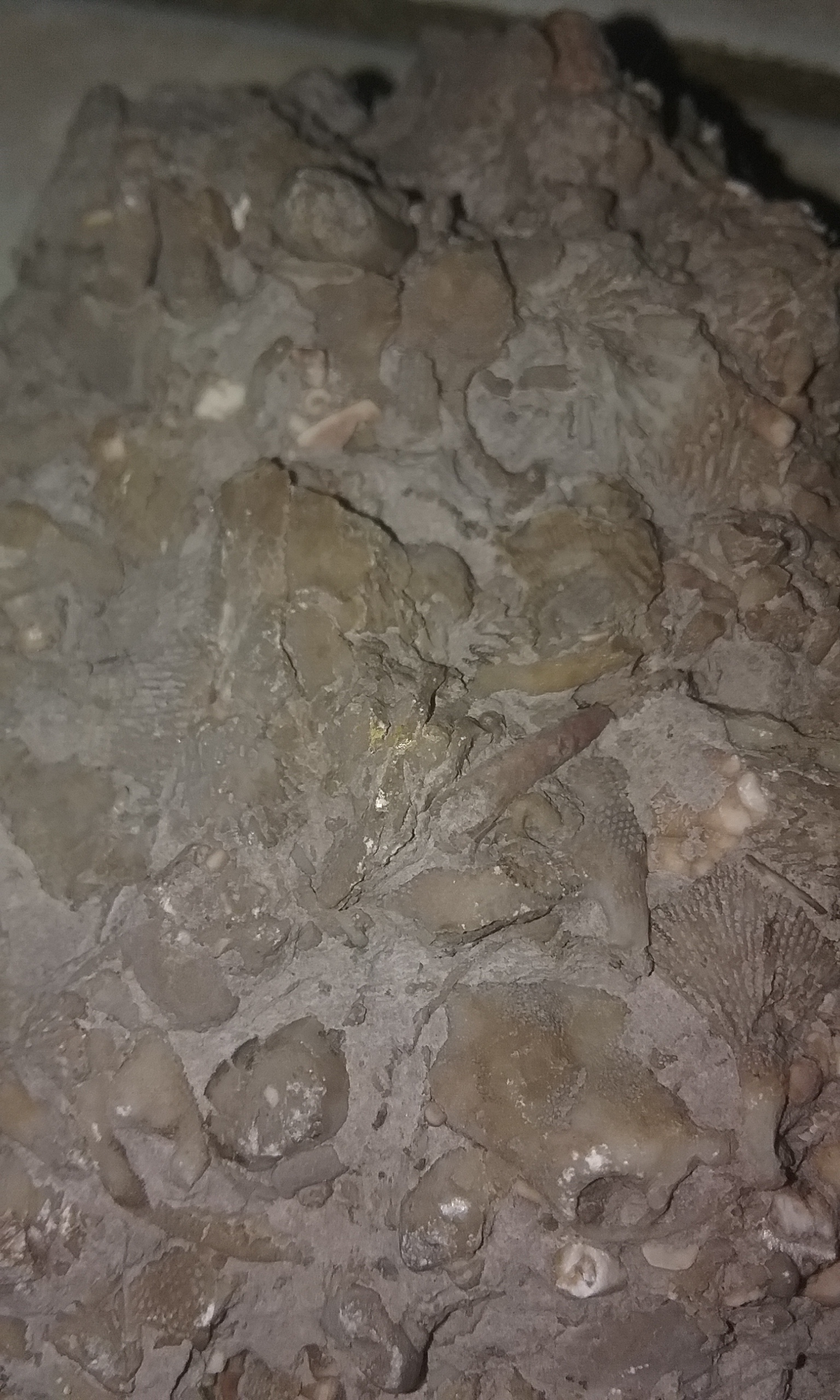
Rare fossilization of Chasmatopora in Ohio

Chasmatopora is an extinct genus of bryozoans which existed in what is now Mongolia, China, Estonia, Russia, Poland, Argentina, the United States and Canada. It was described by Alcide d'Orbigny in 1849, and the type species is Chasmatopora tenella, which was originally described as a species of Retepora by Eichwald in 1842.

== Species ==
- Chasmatopora aperta Kopajevich, 1984
- Chasmatopora disparilis Liu, 1980
- Chasmatopora extensa Liu, 1980
- Chasmatopora flexa Zheng, 1990
- Chasmatopora livonica (Nekhoroshev, 1960)
- Chasmatopora moyeroensis Nekhoroshev, 1955
- Chasmatopora pusilla Astrova, 1965
- Chasmatopora silurica (Kopaevich, 1975)
- Chasmatopora sublaxa Ulrich, 1890
- Chasmatopora hypnoides (Sharpe, 1853)
- Chasmatopora tenella (Eichwald, 1842)
- Chasmatopora tricellata (Nekhoroshev, 1955)
- Chasmatopora rossae Ernst & Carrera, 2012
