= Argentinodictya =

† Argentinodictya lenticulata Temporal range: Sandbian

Scientific classification
- Kingdom: Animalia
- Phylum: Bryozoa
- Class: Stenolaemata
- Order: †Cryptostomida
- Family: †Ptilodictyidae
- Genus: †Argentinodictya; Ernst & Carrera, 2012
- Species: †A. lenticulata

Binomial name
- †Argentinodictya lenticulata Ernst & Carrera, 2012

Extinct genus of moss animals

Argentinodictya is an extinct genus of bryozoans which existed in what is now Argentina during the Late Ordovician. It was described by Andrej Ernst and Marcelo Carrera in 2012, and the type and only species is Argentinodictya lenticulata.
