= Admirandopora =

Admirandopora Temporal range: Early Carboniferous

Scientific classification
- Kingdom: Animalia
- Phylum: Bryozoa
- Class: Stenolaemata
- Order: †Fenestrida
- Family: †Admiratellidae
- Genus: †Admirandopora; Ariunchimeg, 2012

Synonyms
- Admiranda Ariunchimeg, 1996 non Marfenkova, 1991

Extinct genus of moss animals

Admirandopora is an extinct genus of bryozoans which existed in what is now Mongolia during the Early Carboniferous period. It was described by Y. Ariunchimeg in 1996 as "Admiranda", but Ariunchimeg subsequently changed its name in 2012, after it had been discovered that Admiranda was preoccupied by a fossil foraminifer. The new generic name means "surprising pore" in Latin.
