= Protorthida =

Scientific classification
- Kingdom: Animalia
- Phylum: Brachiopoda
- Class: Rhynchonellata
- Order: †Protorthida

Families
- Superfamily Protorthoidea; Protorthidae; Arctohedridae; Leioriidae; Superfamily Skenidioidea; Skenidiidae

Extinct order of marine lamp shells

Protorthida is an extinct order of Rhynchonellate brachiopods containing the taxa:

- Superfamily Protorthoidea
  - Family Protorthidae
  - Family Arctohedridae
  - Family Leioriidae
- Superfamily Skenidioidea
  - Family Skenidiidae
