= Disappointment Bay Formation =

Geologic feature in Nunavut, Canada

- Stratigraphic range: Devonian
- Type: Geological formation
- Thickness: Between 85 and 90 meters thick on Lowther Island

Location
- Region: Nunavut
- Country: Canada

Type section
- Named by: Thorsteinsson, 1958

The Disappointment Bay Formation is a geologic formation in Nunavut, extending from Ellesmere Island in the east to Bathurst Island in the west. It preserves fossils dating back to the Devonian period, primarily of invertebrates.

== Fossil Content ==
=== Fish ===
Vertebrate remains are rare in this formation. Indeterminate spine fragments are found throughout the Lowther Island off-reef limestones but are rare. A 2-centimeter wide fragment found in the 2 m-level ammonoid bed of Young Island may represent a cyathaspidid.

=== Invertebrates ===
Bivalves
Genus	Species	Presence	Material	Notes	Images
Eoschizodus?	E.? sp.	Lowther Island	"Two small silicified internal moulds."	Very small shell, maximum 3 millimeters in length.	
Gosseletia	G. n. sp.	Lowther Island	"One small complete specimen, 19 single valves, all silicified"		
Palaeoneilo	P. n. sp.	Lowther Island	"One complete articulated specimen and 15 isolated valves, all silicified".		
Paracyclas	P. proavia	Lowther Island	6 articulated silicified specimens.	Shell up to 45 millimeters long.	
Phenacocyclas	P. n. sp.	Lowther Island	"Four complete specimens, one shell fragment, all silicified".	A lucinid up to 20 millimeters across.	
Praecardium	P. sp.	Young Island, 2m.	3 partially exposed internal moulds.		
Protomya?	P.? n. sp.	Lowther Island	14 silicified specimens.	"Elongate, oval, ratio of length to height about 2:1". This species cannot be conveniently placed in any genus and is only tentatively placed in Protomya, and alternatively recalls Dystactella subnasuta.	
Solemya	S. (Janeia) sp.	Young Island, 2 m interval, some specimens preserved in near life-position with anterior directed upwards.	15 complete to near complete internal moulds, some retaining shell material.		

Brachiopods
Genus	Species	Presence	Material	Notes	Images
Ambocoeliidae	Ambocoeliidae indet.	Lowther Island, lower off-reef strata.	A few dozen specimens on hand-samples.		
Ancillotoechia	A. rex	Lowther Island off-reef strata, 45 m (2 specimens), 65 m (23 specimens).	25 silicified, articulated specimens.	A trigonirhychiid.	
Athyrhynchus	A. susanae	Lowther Island off-reef strata, from about 24–30 m.	About a dozen specimens.	A leiorhynchid.	
Atrypa	A. sp. A	Lowther Island reefs, Facies 2 (5 specimens), Facies 3 (1 specimen).	6 specimens	An atrypid.	
Atrypa	A. sp. B	Lowther Island reefs, Facies 1 (10 specimens), Facies 2 (28 specimens).	38 specimens	An atrypid.	
Atrypa	A. sp. C	Lowther Island off-reef strata, 45 m (11 specimens), 65 m (about 100 specimens).	Over 100 specimens, all silicified, and in both articulated and disarticulated condition.	An atrypid.	
Carinagypa	C. aseptata	"Lowther Island reefs, Facies 1 (33 specimens), Facies 2 (134 specimens), Facies 3 (3 specimens)".		A gypidulid.	
Carinatina	C. lowtherensis	Lowther Island reefs, mostly in Reef Facies 2 (3 specimens from Facies 3).	About 120 specimens.	An atrypid.	
Cassidirostrum	C. radiatum	Lowther Island off-reef strata, 45 m (1 specimen), 65 m (2 specimens).	3 silicified, articulated specimens.	A trigonirhynchiid.	
"Chonetes"	"C". sp. A	Lowther Island off-reef strata, 65 m.	2 silicified brachial valves.	A chonetid.	
"Chonetes"	"C". sp. B	Lowther Island off-reed strata, 45 m (1 specimen) and 65 m (4 specimens).	5 silicified valves, plus a few fragments.	A chonetid.	
"Chonetes"	"C". sp. C	Lowther Island off-reef strata, 65 m.	35 silicified valves.	A chonetid.	
Cymostrophia	C. sp.	Lowther Island reefs, Facies 2.	20 specimens.	A stropheodontid.	
cf. Desquamatia	cf. D. sp.	Lowther Island		An atrypid.	
?Devonochonetes	?D. sp.	Young Island, 2 m.	"A single, small (4 mm along hingeline) specimen, demonstrating the pedicle valve exterior".	A chonetid. May be conspecific with the Lowther Island "Chonetes" sp. C, but inadequate preservation of both hampers meaningful comparison.	
Elythyna	E. transversa intermedia	Lowther Island, off-reef strata. One specimen from Young Island.	About 100 specimens in hand sample.	A reticulariid.	
Elythyna	E. kingi	Lowther Island upper off-reef strata.	About 100 silicified specimens, both articulated and disarticulated.	A reticulariid.	
Glossinulina	G. khodalevichi	Lowther Island reefs, Facies 2.	17 articulated specimens.	An uncinulid.	
Lingula	L. sp.	Young Island 2 m	"One small (3 mm) complete brachial valve, and a few valve fragments".	A lingulid.	
?Megastrophia	?M. sp.	Lowther Island reef R-4, Facies 2 (locality R-4 no. 27)	A single, nearly complete, exterior pedicle valve.	A stropheodontid.	
Orbiculoidea	O. sp. A	Lowther Island, Reef R-7, upper Reef Facies 2 (locality R-7, N-5).	"A single, well-preserved pedicle valve showing the interior surface".	A discinid.	
Orbiculoidea	O. sp. B?	Young Island, 2 m.	"A single, partially-crushed pedicle valve (external surface exposed), and a few valve fragments".	A discinid.	
?Parachonetes	P.? sp.	Lowther Island reefs, Facies 2.	5 poorly-preserved specimens.	A chonetid.	
Phragmostrophia	P. cf. P. merriami	Lowther Island off-reef strata, Young Island.	Dozens of specimens from Lowther Island, about 20 specimens from Young Island.	A pholidostrophiid.	
Punctatrypa	P. sp.	Lowther Island off-reef strata, 45 m (4 specimens), 65 m (3 specimens).	7 silicified, articulated specimens.	An atrypid.	
Schizophoria	S. nevadaensis	Lowther Island reefs, Facies 1 (2 specimens), Facies 2 (9 specimens).		A schizophoriid.	
Schuchertella	"S." cf S. nevadaensis	Lowther Island reefs, Facies 3 (locality R-8 no. 37).	A single articulated specimen.	A schuchertellid.	
Spinatrypa	S. (Invertrypa) sp.	Lowther Island reefs, Facies 2 (39 specimens), Facies 3 (1 specimen).	40 specimens.	An atrypid.	
Spinatrypa	S. (Invertrypa) sp. A	Lowther Island off-reef strata, 65 m (1 specimen from 45 m).	About 150 silicified specimens, about half of which are articulated.	An atrypid.	
Spirinella	S. ultima	Lowther Island reefs, Facies 2.	5 specimens.	A reticulariid.	
Spurispirifer	S. vijaicoides	Lowther Island reefs, Facies 2.	3 specimens.	A reticulariid.	
Vagrania	V. sp.	Lowther Island, reef R-2, Facies 3 and reef R-8, Facies 3.	Many dozens of external moulds from reef R-2, Facies 3, and 8 partial, poorly-preserved specimens from reef R-8, Facies 3.	An atrypid.	

Cephalopods
Genus	Species	Presence	Material	Notes	Images
Bactrites	B. sp.	Lowther Island	3 small silicified fragments.	A bactritid.	
Lobobactrites	L. ellipticus	Young Island and Lowther Island	Numerous large, incomplete specimens from Young Island, and juvenile remains from both Young and Lowther Island.	A bactritid.	
Mimagoniatites	M. nearcticus	Young Island and Lowther Island	About 100 specimens from Young Island and numerous more from Lowther Island of both mature and juvenile individuals.	An ammonoid.	
Palaeogoniatites	Palaeogoniatites aff. P. janus	Lowther Island	A single mature specimen along with numerous silicified shell fragments, protoconchs and early whorls.	An ammonoid.	

Corals
Genus	Species	Presence	Material	Notes	Images
Alveolites	A. sp.	"Lowther Island reefs, upper Facies 1 (uncommon), Facies 2 (abundant), Facies 3 (common lower; rare upper)".	About a dozen nearly complete coralla and numerous fragments.	An alveolitid.	
Favosites	F. sphaericus	Lowther Island, reef R-3, upper Facies 2.	"A single, 15 cm-wide corallum".	A tabulatan.	
Favosites	F. sp.	Lowther Island reefs, upper Facies 2 (reefs R-4, R-3 and R-7).	"3 partial coralla and numerous fragments".	A tabulatan, coralla can reach up to 2 meters across.	
Gracilopora?	G.? sp.	Lowther Island reefs, lower Facies 3 (reef R-8).	"3 partial coralla, and about a dozen other occurrences of solitary branches, all slabbed surfaces".	A pachyporid.	
"Hexagonaria"	"H." sp.	Lowther Island, off-reef strata.	"A single, well-preserved corallum".		
Roemeripora	R. progenitor?	Lowther Island reefs, Facies 3 (reef R-8).	2 partial coralla.		
Roemeripora	R.? sp.	Lowther Island reef R-2, Facies 3.	4 poorly-preserved coralla.	The most abundant coral framebuilder in Reef Facies 3.	
Salairia	S. sp.	Lowther Island reefs, upper Facies 2 (R-4), Facies 3 (R-8, R-2).	About a dozen specimens.		
Syringoporidae indet.		Lowther Island reef, R-2, Facies 3.	"2 small (about 10 cm across) coralla, vert poorly preserved".		

Sponges
Genus	Species	Presence	Material	Notes	Images
Clathrodictyon	C. ellesmerense	Reef R-8, Facies 3 (complete specimens and fragments); reef R-4, uppermost Facies 2 (fragments only)".	"4 complete to nearly complete coenostea, and numerous fragments".		
Hindia	H. sphaeroidalis	Lowther Island, 65 m.	"A single, small (diameter 1 cm) silicified specimen".	A lithistid.	
Salairella	S. prima	Reefs R-2 and R-8, Facies 3; reefs R-3 and R-4, upper Facies 2.	5 complete to nearly complete coenostea, and numerous fragments.	A stromatoporoid.	

Tentaculita
Genus	Species	Presence	Material	Notes	Images
Nowakia	N. sp. A	Lowther Island	"10 partial to complete, isolated, silicified specimens".	A nowakiid.	
Nowakia	N. cf N. praecursor	Lowther Island	"A few hundred isolated, silicified specimens".		
Nowakiidae	Nowakiidae n. gen n. sp.	Lowther Island 45 m.	"4 isolated, silicified specimens, 2 partial, 2 complete".	New genus and species, probably represents an earlier offshoot of the Nowakia lineage, perhaps derived fromTurkestanella (Nowakia) acuaria.	
Styliolina	S. cf. S. sp. A	Young Island and Lowther Island.	"About 100 isolated silicified specimens preserving the proximal 3-4 mm (Young Island). Many hundreds of complete silicified specimens (Lowther Island)".	A styliolinid.	
Uniconus	Uniconus cf. U. orbiculus	Young Island and Lowther Island.		A tentaculitid.	
Viriatella	V. n. sp.	Young Island 2 m.	4 isolated, silicified specimens.		
Viriatellina	V. aff. V. pseudogeinitziana	"Young Island 2 m, Lowther Island 45 m, and reefs R-10, R-7 and R-4 (reef facies 1, 2, and 2A)".		A nowakiid.	
Volynites	V. triannulatus	Lowther Island.	"About 100 isolated, silicified specimens".	A tentaculitid	

Trilobites
Genus	Species	Presence	Material	Notes	Images
Arctipeltis	A. canadensis	Lowther Island reefs, samples R-7 no. 5, R-4 no.4b, R-10 no.8 (all Reef Facies 2).	3 partial to nearly complete pygdia.	Originally referred to Weberopeltis aff. arcticum.	
Astycoryphe	A. n. sp.?	Lowther Island, reef R-10, sample locality no.3 (Facies 2A).	Numerous partial to complete cranidia and pygdia.		
Kielania	K. triabsidata				
Schizoproetoides	S. ellesmerensis	Lowther Island, off-reef section LLW-4 (40 m level), Young Island 2 m.	"One complete enrolled specimen, and two separate pygdial impressions".	A proetid.	

Other invertebrates
Genus	Species	Presence	Material	Notes	Images
Hyolithes	H. n. sp.	Lowther Island, reef R-10, Reef Facies 2.	A single complete specimen.	Robust conoid shell measuring 25 millimeters long.	
Plagioglypta	P. sp.	Lowther Island off-reef strata	"About 100 silicified specimens".	A dentalioid scaphopod.	

=== Plants and algae ===
Algae
Genus	Species	Presence	Material	Notes	Images
Dasycladacea indet.		Reef R-7 (Facies 2)	"2 separate occurrences of densely aggregated thalli, with poorly preserved internal structure".	Distinguished from Vermiporella? sp. by being half its size and possessing distinctive, very regular segmented branching pattern.	
Girvanella	G. problematica (=G. ducii)	"Found throughout the reefal succession, most evidently preserved in reef R-10 (Facies 2A)".	Found either as encrustacions or small aggregates.	A cyanophyte	
Indeterminate algal spheroids		Observed in algally-dominated reef sediments, principally in reef R-10.	A small number of relatively large (up to 1.5 cm in diameter) spheroids of uncertain algal origin, apparently composed of thin, radiating tubules or filaments, but completely dolomitized that internal observation is impossible.		
Ischadites	I. sp.	"Lowther Island, reef R-7 (upper Facies 2), reef R-4 (Facies 2); silicified meroms from 65m level in the off-reed strata".	"Two complete specimens, and two incomplete, flattened specimens. Two isolated silicified meroms".	A receptaculitceaen	
Renalcis	R. cf. "devonicus"	"Evident throughout the lower reefal succession, but most commonly encountered and best preserved in reef R-10 (Facies 2)".	"Occurs as thin encrustations, especially on large-bodied algae such as Vermiporella, and also as small aggregates. Typically poorly preserved".	A cyanophyte	
Resteignella	R. sp.	Reefs R-10 and R-7 (Facies 2 and 2A).	Numerous thin-sections and polished slabs.	Intimately associated with other algae, notably Sphaerocodium and Vermiporella.	
Sphaerocodium	S. magnum	"Throughout the lower reefal succession (Facies 1 and 2), but most commonly preserved in reef R-10 (Facies 2A)".		Often intimately associated with Resteignella sp. and rarely occurs as encrustations on larger particles.	
Sphaerocodium	S. munthei	"Throughout the lower reefal succession (Facies 1 and 2), but most commonly preserved in reef R-10 (Facies 2A)".	Occurs either as thin encrustations or small aggregates.		
Vermiporella?	V.? sp.	Lowther Island reefs, Facies 2 and 2A, but most commonly preserved in reefs R-10, R-7 and R-4.	Numerous thin-sections and polished slabs.	A dasycladale	

Plants
Genus	Species	Presence	Material	Notes	Images
Drepanophycus?	D.? sp.	"Lowther Island, 45 m, off-reef strata".	"A single, poorly-preserved, silicified fragment, some 9 cm long by 1 cm in diameter".	May indicate the presence of a nearby landmass at the time of the formation's deposition.	

== See also ==
- List of fossiliferous stratigraphic units in Nunavut
