= Otomar Pravoslav Novák =

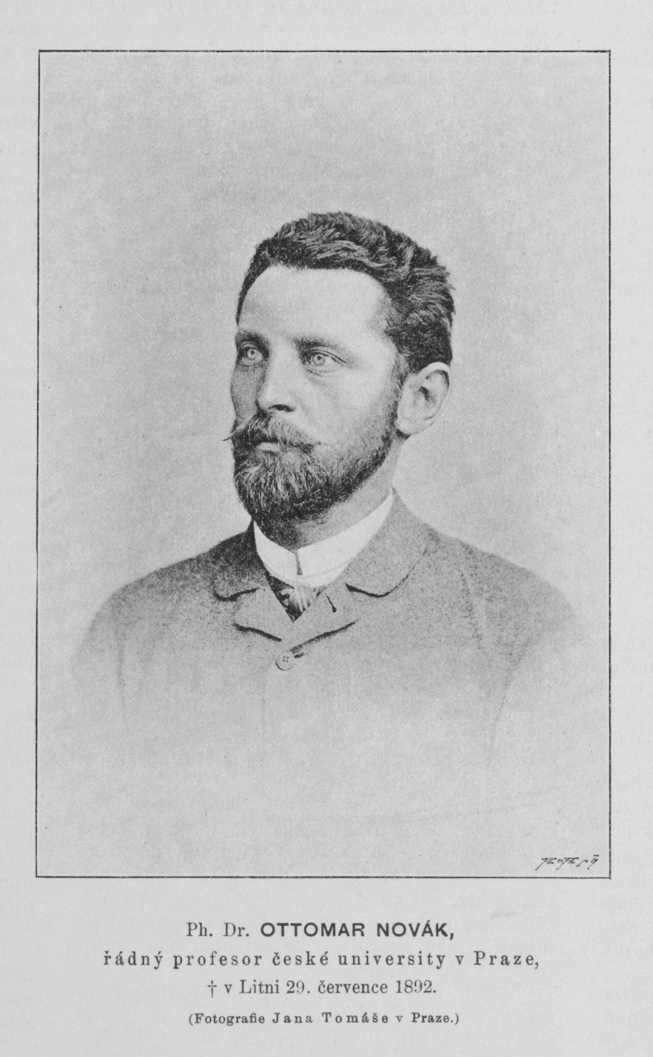
Novák in 1892

Otomar Pravoslav Novák (16 November 1851 – 28 July 1892) was a Czech paleontologist. A student of Joachim Barrande, he worked at the University of Prague and specialized in the trilobites.

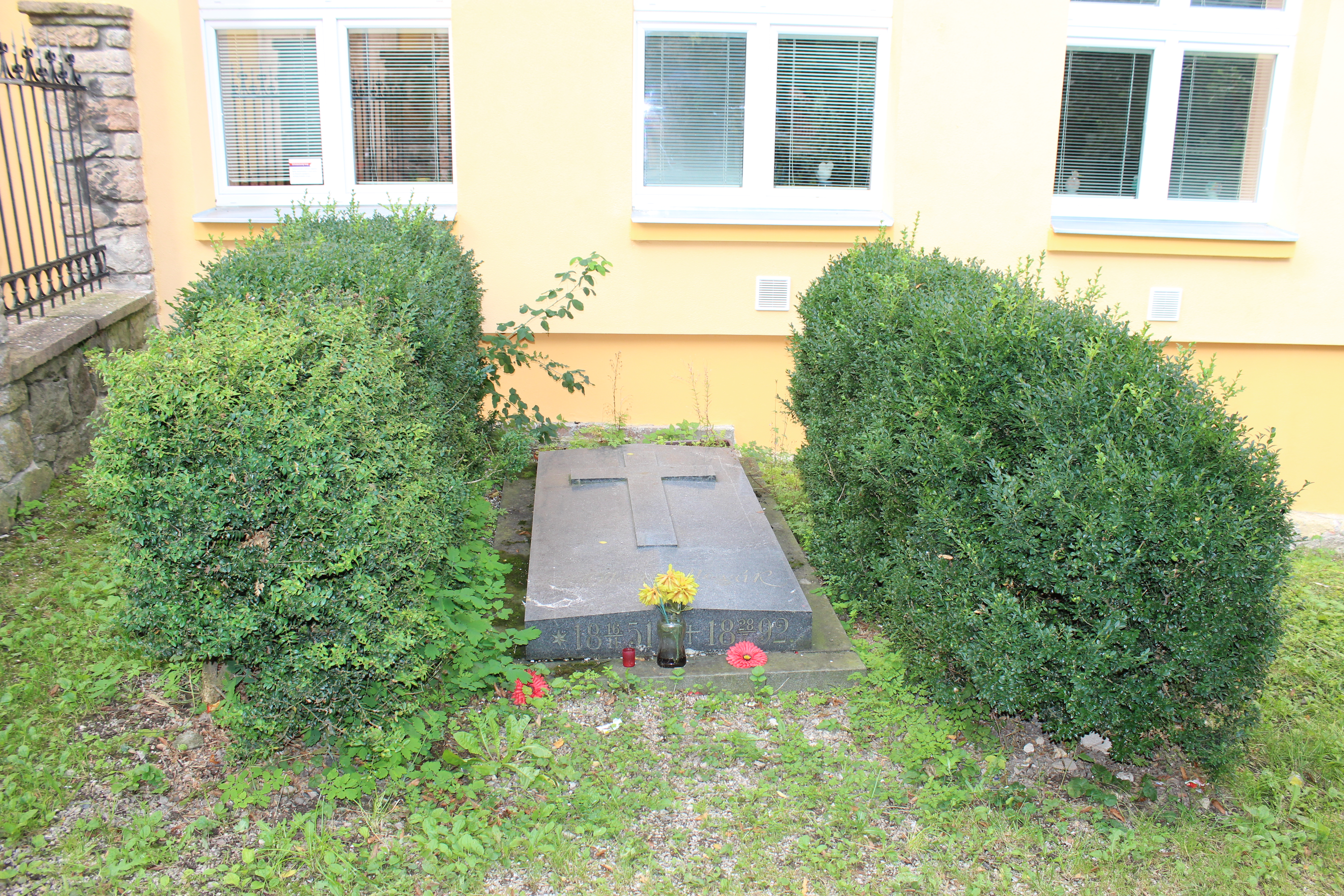
Novák's grave beside the high school in Liteň

Novák was born in Königgrätz (Hradec Králové), son of government officer Johann and Aloisia née Piperger. He became interested in paleontology early in life thanks to the influence of his uncle Karel Feistmantel (1819–1885). He studied at the grammar school in Prague followed by medical studies at the university until 1875. He did not complete his studies and in 1873 he became an assistant in paleontology under Antonín Frič at the museum. He then studied at the University of Prague and in 1879 his dissertation was on the bryozoa of the Bohemian cretaceous. In 1879 he became an assistant to Jan Krejčí. Around 1874 he studied the Silurian fauna along with Joachim Barrande and began to work along with Wilhelm Heinrich Waagen. He worked at the University of Vienna for two years under Eduard Suess. From 1881 to 1883 he worked at the university teaching paleontology until Otokar Feistmantel was appointed. From 1883 he worked at the geological institute of the Czech University in Prague. He married Elonora Fiedler in 1884. He examined the collections of Josef Freiherr von Zeidler and others. In 1887 he succeeded Krejčí as professor at the University of Prague but his health became bad in 1891 and he went to Italy to improve. He returned in 1892 without much improvement and lived with his sister Růžena Wiltrová in Liteň. He began to study the Paleolithic in quarry sites near Liteň while living with his sister who was married to Jan Wilt, the headmaster of the local school. He died here from tuberculosis.

Several species have been named after Novák including the genus Nowakia and the trilobites Encrinurus novaki (1887), Tropidocoryphe novaki (1896) and Proetus novaki (1964).
