= Feistmantl =

Feistmantl or Feistmantel is a German surname. Notable people with the surname include:

- Josef Feistmantl (1939–2019), Austrian luger
- Karl Feistmantl, Austrian luger
- Karel Feistmantel (1819–1885), Czech geologist
- Otokar Feistmantel (1848-1891), Czech-Austrian geologist and paleontologist

== See also ==
- Feistmantel Valley, fossiliferous valley in Antarctica, named after Otokar Feistmantel
