= Garrett Island =

Garrett Island may refer to:

- Garrett Island (Nunavut), in the Barrow Strait
- Garrett Island (Maryland), in the Susquehanna River
