= Barrandeites =

Scientific classification
- Kingdom: Animalia
- Phylum: Mollusca
- Class: Cephalopoda
- Subclass: †Ammonoidea
- Genus: †Barrandeites

Genus of molluscs (fossil)

Barrandeites is an extinct genus of cephalopods belonging to the Ammonite subclass. It takes its name in honour of the paleontologist Joachim Barrande.
