= Dacryoconarida =

Dacryoconarida Temporal range: Devonian

Scientific classification
- Kingdom: Animalia
- Class: †Tentaculita
- Subclass: †Dacryoconarida; Fisher, 1962

Orders
- Nowakiida†; Styliolinida†

Dacryoconarida is an extinct subclass of free living animals from the Tentaculita class, which were common in the Devonian oceans (Fisher, 1962). Dacryoconarids have a subspherical, drop- or tear-shaped embryonic chamber. The phylogenetic affinities of tentaculites are not fully resolved; they have often been placed among molluscs, but recent microstructural analyses place them among the Lophophorata. Their fossils are known from Devonian rocks of Australia, Asia, Europe, North Africa and North America.
