= Karel Feistmantel =

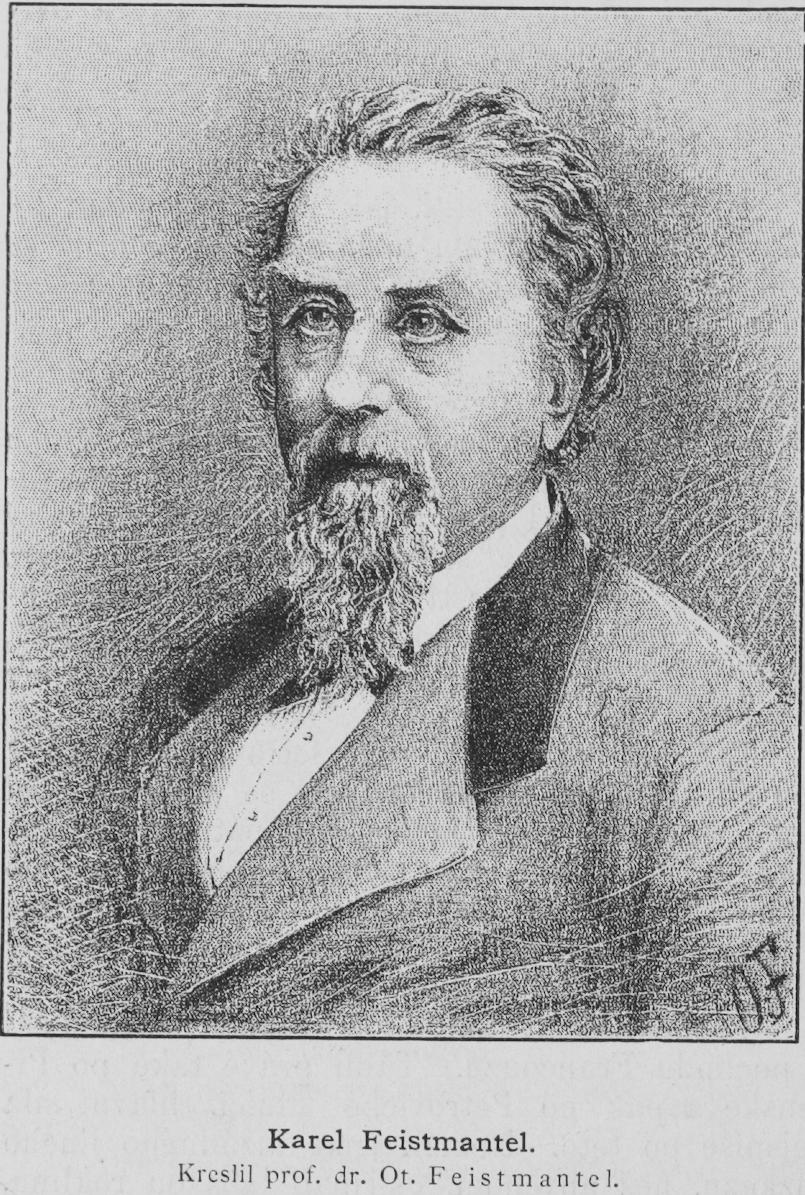

Karel Feistmantel (14 February 1819 – 29 September 1885) was a Czech geologist and paleontologist who explored the coal deposits of central of western Bohemia. His son Otakar Feistmantel became a geologist in India.

== Life ==
Feistmantel was born in Prague, the son of a popular theatre actor Franz X. František. He studied at the local grammar schools before joining Prague polytechnic in 1834 where he was influenced by the mineralogist Franz Xaver Zippe. He then worked for the industrialist and nobleman Karel Fürstenberg at Křivoklát estate working on the management of mines and smelting in Stará Huť, Nová Huť, Nový Jáchymov, Roztoky and Břasy. He worked on iron smelting until he retired in 1878 to Prague. Joachim Barrande was a friend. He identified a fossil in 1850 that he called Lingula Feistmanteli. After his retirement he took a greater interest in paleontology and discovered many fossil including several that have been named after him. Most of his work on the fossil flora of Bohemia was published in Lotos. He also drew illustrations of his finds and was an excellent watercolour artist. He was a correspondent of Royal Czech Society of Sciences (1868) and a member of the Society of the Kingdom of Bohemia (1883).

He was buried in the Malvazinky Cemetery in Prague. His son Otakar Feistmantel went to work in the Geological Survey of India.
