= Nowakia =

Nowakia Temporal range: 443.7–376.1 Ma

Scientific classification
- Kingdom: Animalia
- Class: †Tentaculita
- Order: †Nowakiida
- Family: †Nowakiidae
- Genus: †Nowakia; Gurich, 1896

Species
- Nowakia acuaria† M Truyols Massoni, 1986; Nowakia hercynica† (Bouček 1964); Nowakia sulcata† (Roemer 1843)

Genus of molluscs

Nowakia is an extinct genus of free living animals from family Nowakiidae. The genus is named after Otomar Pravoslav Novák.

== Other sources ==
- Le genre Nowakia (Dacryoconarides) dans le Praguien (Dévonien) de la République Tcheque: Biométrie, systématique, Phylogénie, Paléoenvironnements. S Gessa, 1996
