= Hamilton Island (Nunavut) =

Uninhabited island in the Canadian Arctic

- Location within Nunavut Location within Canada

Geography
- Location: Parry Channel
- Coordinates: 74°20′N 099°01′W
- Archipelago: Arctic Archipelago

Administration
- Canada
- Nunavut: Nunavut
- Region: Qikiqtaaluk

Demographics
- Population: Uninhabited

The uninhabited Hamilton Island is located in Qikiqtaaluk Region, Nunavut, Canada. It is a member of the Arctic Archipelago and lies in the Parry Channel, north of Russell Island, and southwest of Young Island.
