= Young Island (Nunavut) =

Island in Nunavut, Canada

- Location within Nunavut Location within Canada

Geography
- Location: Northern Canada
- Coordinates: 74°19′N 98°40′W
- Archipelago: Arctic Archipelago

Administration
- Canada
- Territory: Nunavut
- Region: Qikiqtaaluk

Demographics
- Population: Uninhabited

Young Island is an uninhabited member of the Arctic Archipelago in the territory of Nunavut. It lies in the Parry Channel, southwest of Lowther Island, and northeast of Hamilton Island.

Two more Young Islands lie within Nunavut. One is a member of the Low Islands, in Ungava Bay, near Aupaluk; the other is a member of the Hopewell Islands, in Hudson Bay, near Inukjuak.
