= Hýskov =

- Municipality
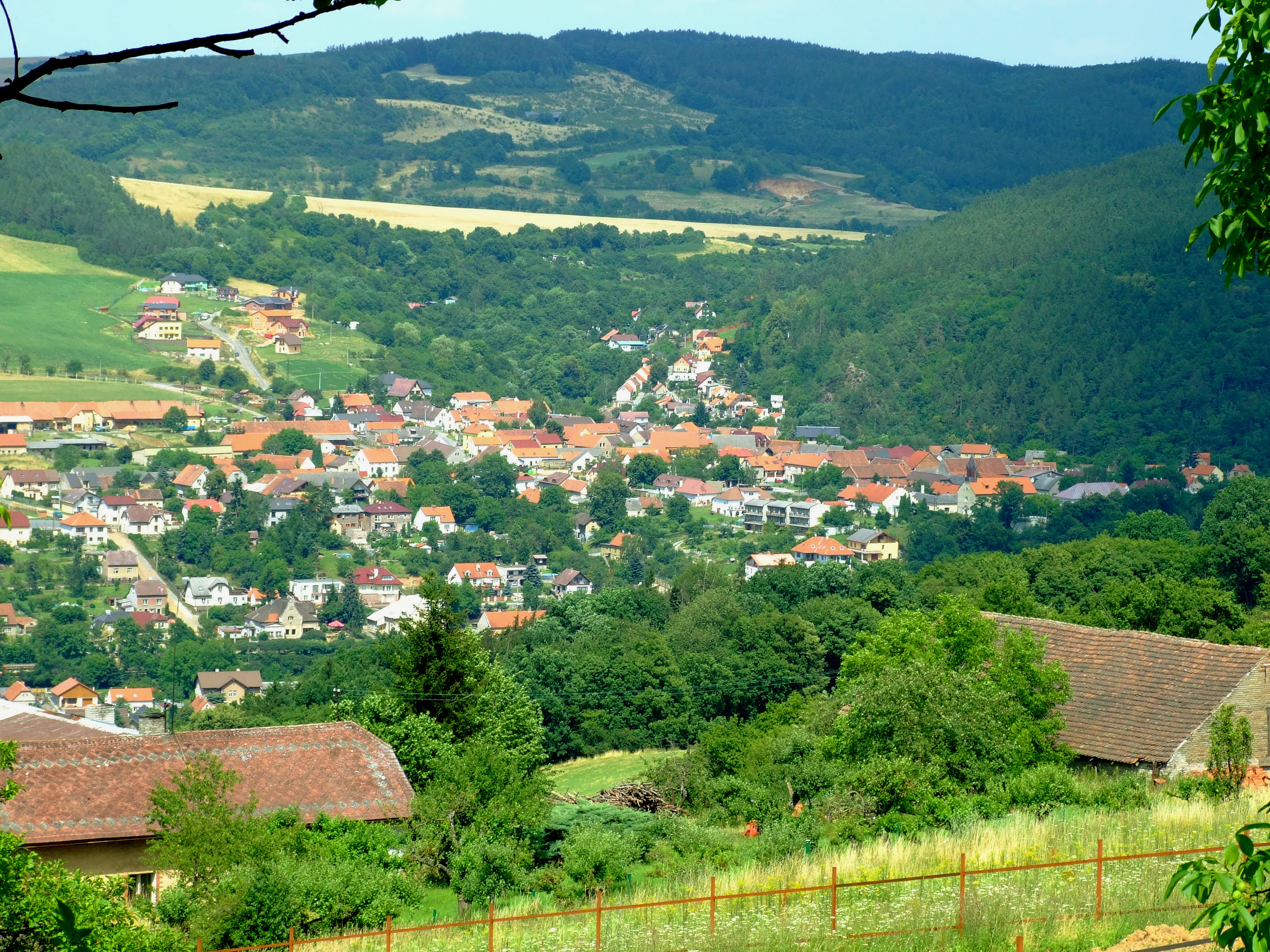
- View from the south

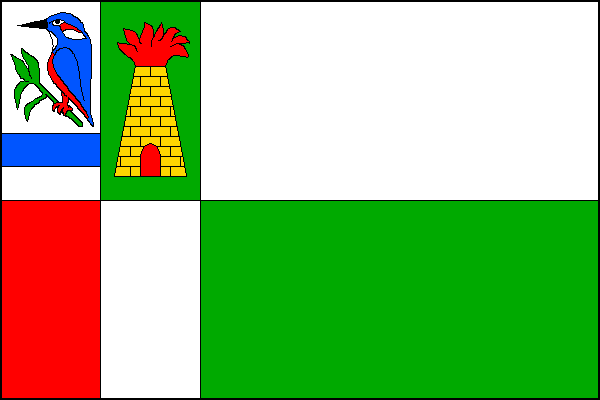
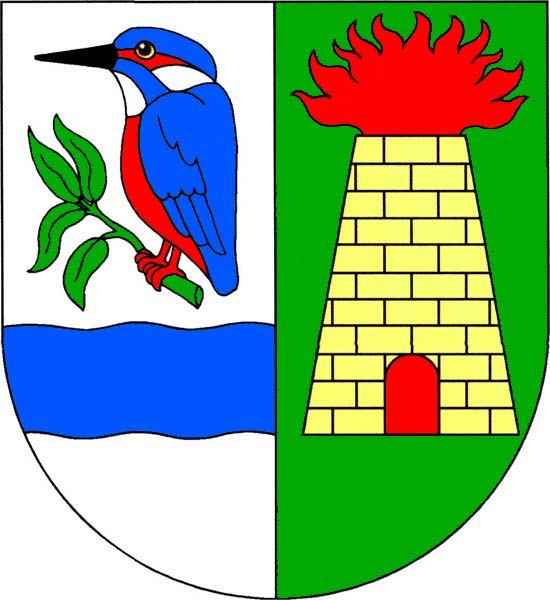
- Flag Coat of arms

- Location in the Czech Republic
- Coordinates: 49°59′27″N 14°3′2″E
- Country: Czech Republic
- Region: Central Bohemian
- District: Beroun
- First mentioned: 1088

Area
  - Total: 6.40 km^{2} (2.47 sq mi)
- Elevation: 266 m (873 ft)

Population (2026-01-01)
  - Total: 2,253
  - Density: 352/km^{2} (912/sq mi)
- Time zone: UTC+1 (CET)
  - Summer (DST): UTC+2 (CEST)
- Postal code: 267 06
- Website: www.obechyskov.cz

Hýskov is a municipality and village in Beroun District in the Central Bohemian Region of the Czech Republic. It has about 2,300 inhabitants.

== Etymology ==
The initial name of the settlement was Héskov. The name was derived from the personal name Hések, meaning "Hések's (court)". From the 17th century, the name Hýskov is used.

== Geography ==
Hýskov is located about 3 kilometres (2 mi) north of Beroun and 21 km (13 mi) west of Prague. It lies in the Křivoklát Highlands, and partly in the Křivoklátsko Protected Landscape Area. The highest point is the hill Kluk at 392 m (1,286 ft) above sea level. The municipality is situated on the left bank of the Berounka River.

== History ==
The first written mention of Hýskov is from 1088, when the village was property of the Vyšehrad Chapter.

== Demographics ==
Historical population

Year	Pop.	±%
1869	1,403	—
1880	1,562	+11.3%
1890	1,529	−2.1%
1900	1,872	+22.4%
1910	1,865	−0.4%

Year	Pop.	±%
1921	1,630	−12.6%
1930	1,636	+0.4%
1950	1,295	−20.8%
1961	1,313	+1.4%
1970	1,272	−3.1%

Year	Pop.	±%
1980	1,236	−2.8%
1991	1,192	−3.6%
2001	1,210	+1.5%
2011	1,582	+30.7%
2021	2,096	+32.5%

Source: Censuses

== Transport ==
Hýskov is located on the railway line Beroun–Rakovník.

== Sights ==
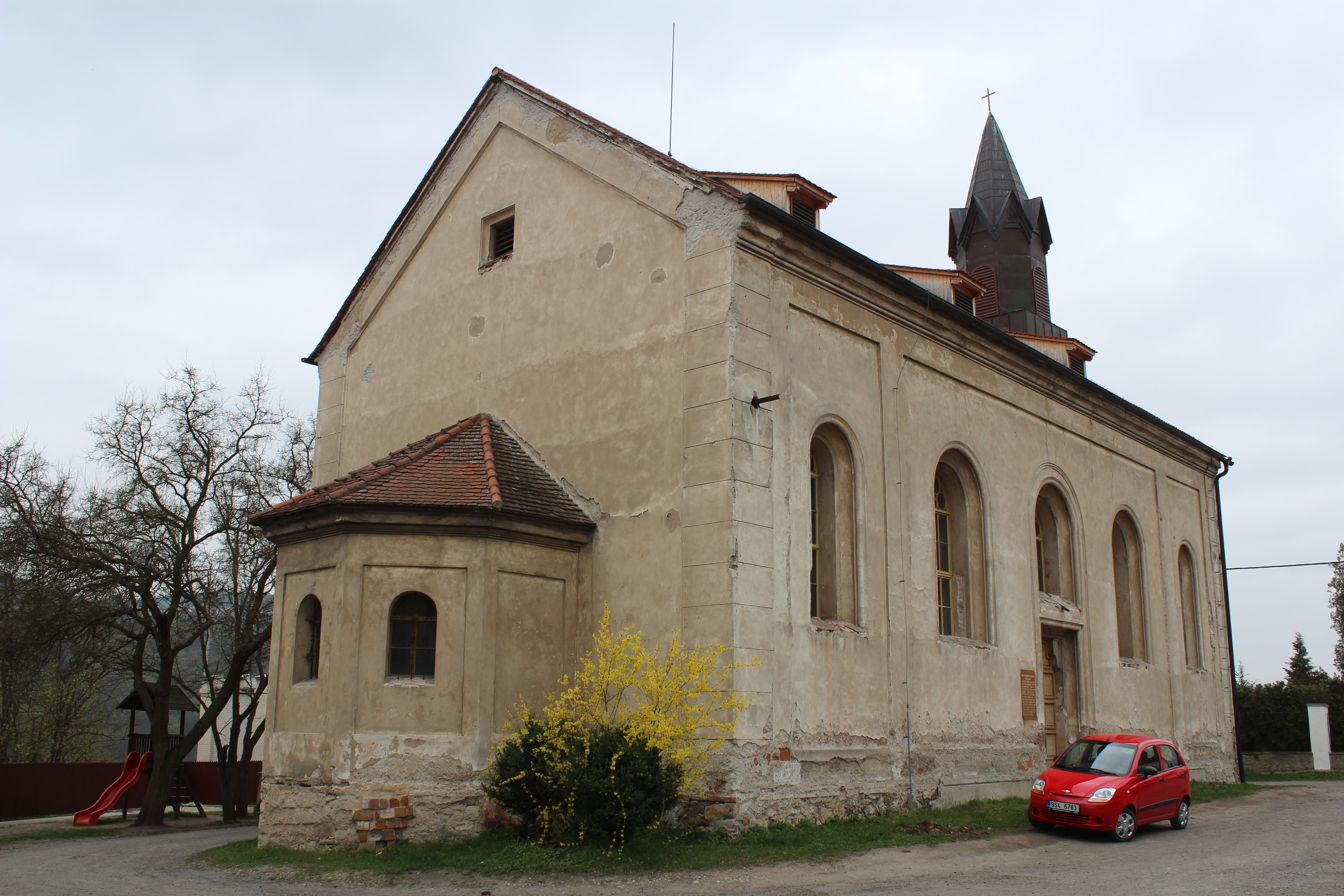
Church of the Nativity of the Virgin Mary

The main landmark of Hýskov is the Church of the Nativity of the Virgin Mary. It was built in the Neo-Romanesque style in the 1840s.

== Notable people ==
- Otokar Feistmantel (1848–1891), geologist and paleontologist
