= Garrett Island (Nunavut) =

Island in Nunavut, Canada

- Location within Nunavut Location within Canada

Geography
- Location: Northern Canada
- Coordinates: 74°45′N 98°15′W
- Archipelago: Queen Elizabeth Islands; Arctic Archipelago

Administration
- Canada
- Territory: Nunavut

Demographics
- Population: Uninhabited

Garrett Island is an island of the Arctic Archipelago, in the territory of Nunavut. It lies in the Barrow Strait, between Bathurst Island (to the north) and Lowther Island (to the southeast).
