= Karlín (Hodonín District) =

- Municipality
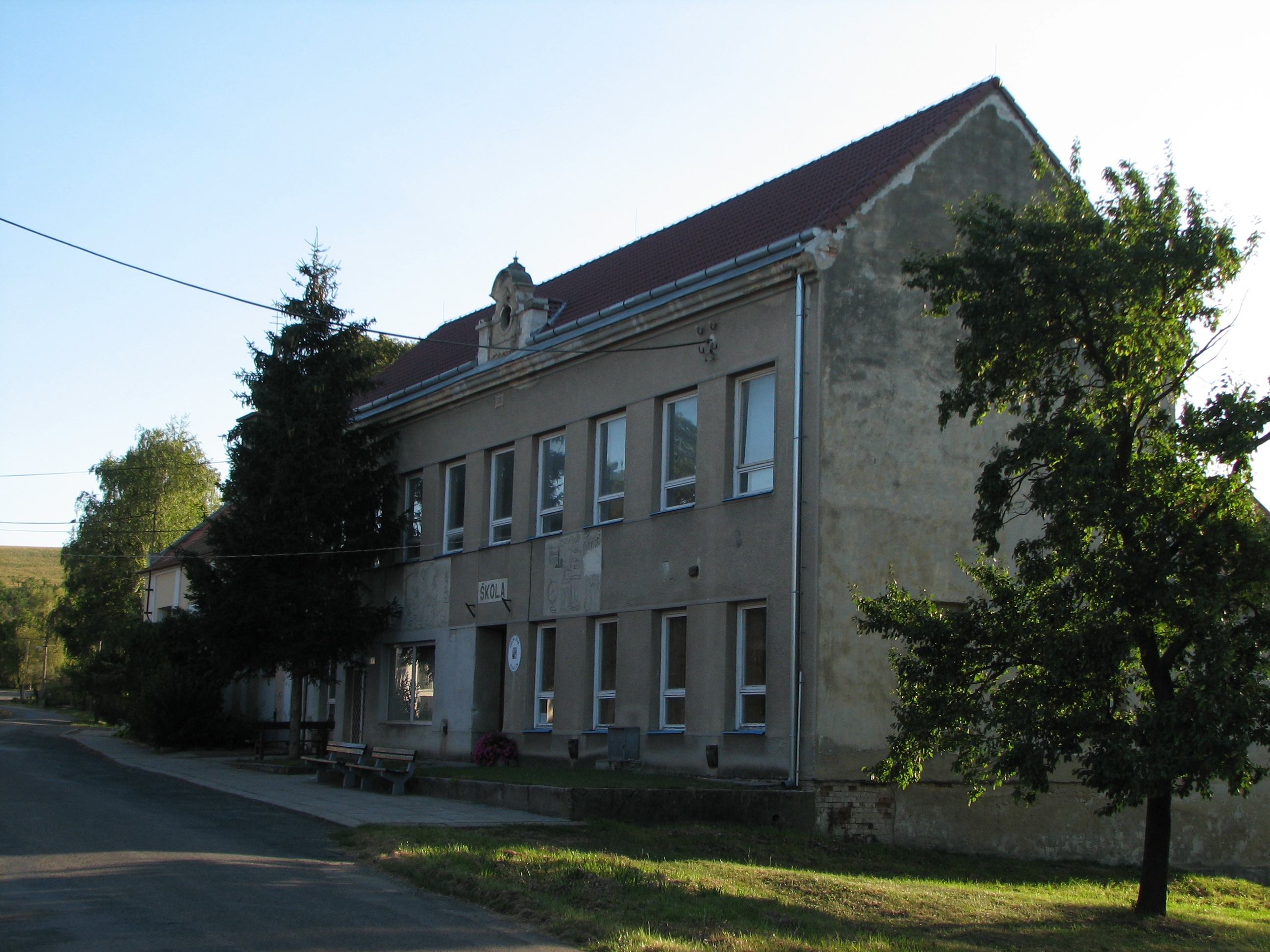
- Municipal office

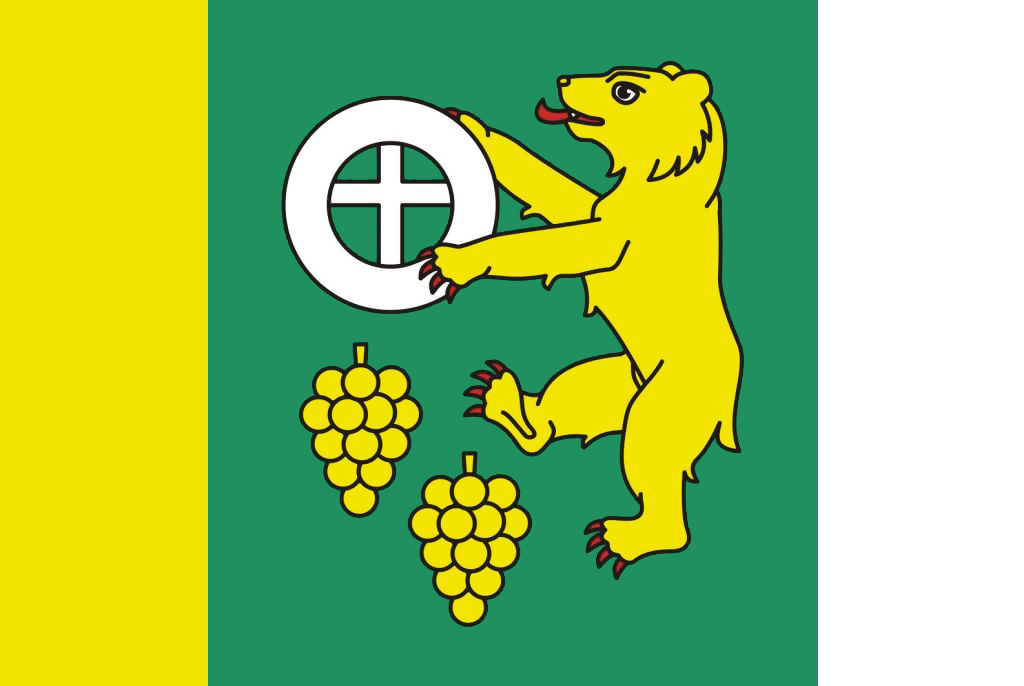
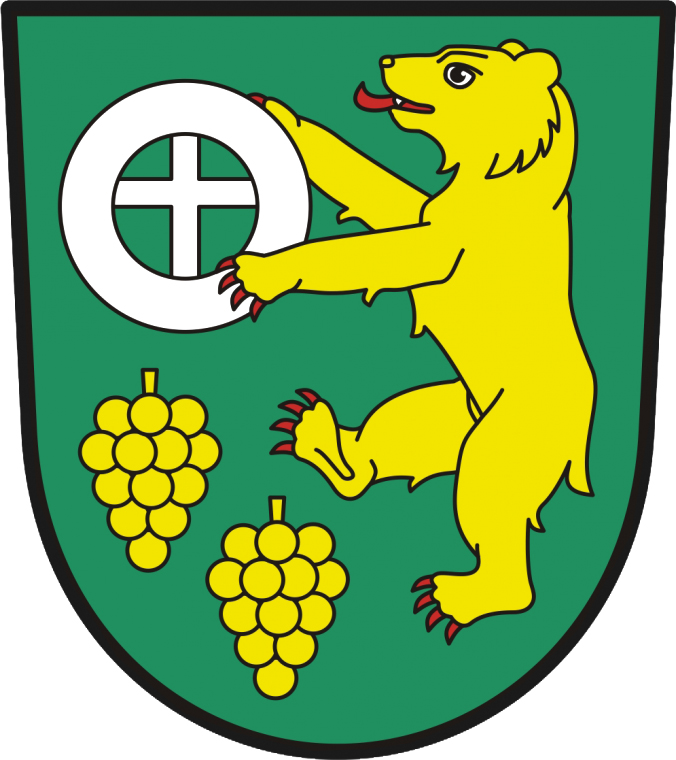
- Flag Coat of arms

- Location in the Czech Republic
- Coordinates: 48°58′33″N 16°58′38″E
- Country: Czech Republic
- Region: South Moravian
- District: Hodonín
- First mentioned: 1292

Area
  - Total: 2.24 km^{2} (0.86 sq mi)
- Elevation: 195 m (640 ft)

Population (2026-01-01)
  - Total: 186
  - Density: 83.0/km^{2} (215/sq mi)
- Time zone: UTC+1 (CET)
  - Summer (DST): UTC+2 (CEST)
- Postal code: 696 14
- Website: www.obeckarlin.cz

Karlín (German: Charlottenfeld) is a municipality and village in Hodonín District in the South Moravian Region of the Czech Republic. It has about 200 inhabitants.

Karlín lies approximately 18 kilometres (11 mi) north-west of Hodonín, 37 km (23 mi) south-east of Brno, and 223 km (139 mi) south-east of Prague.

== Demographics ==
Historical population
Year	Pop.	±%
1869	215	—
1880	268	+24.7%
1890	219	−18.3%
1900	284	+29.7%
1910	419	+47.5%
1921	412	−1.7%
1930	443	+7.5%
1950	377	−14.9%
1961	384	+1.9%
1970	333	−13.3%
1980	283	−15.0%
1991	217	−23.3%
2001	209	−3.7%
2011	257	+23.0%
2021	197	−23.3%
Source: Censuses
