= Otokar Feistmantel =

Czech-Austrian geologist and paleontologist (1848–1891)

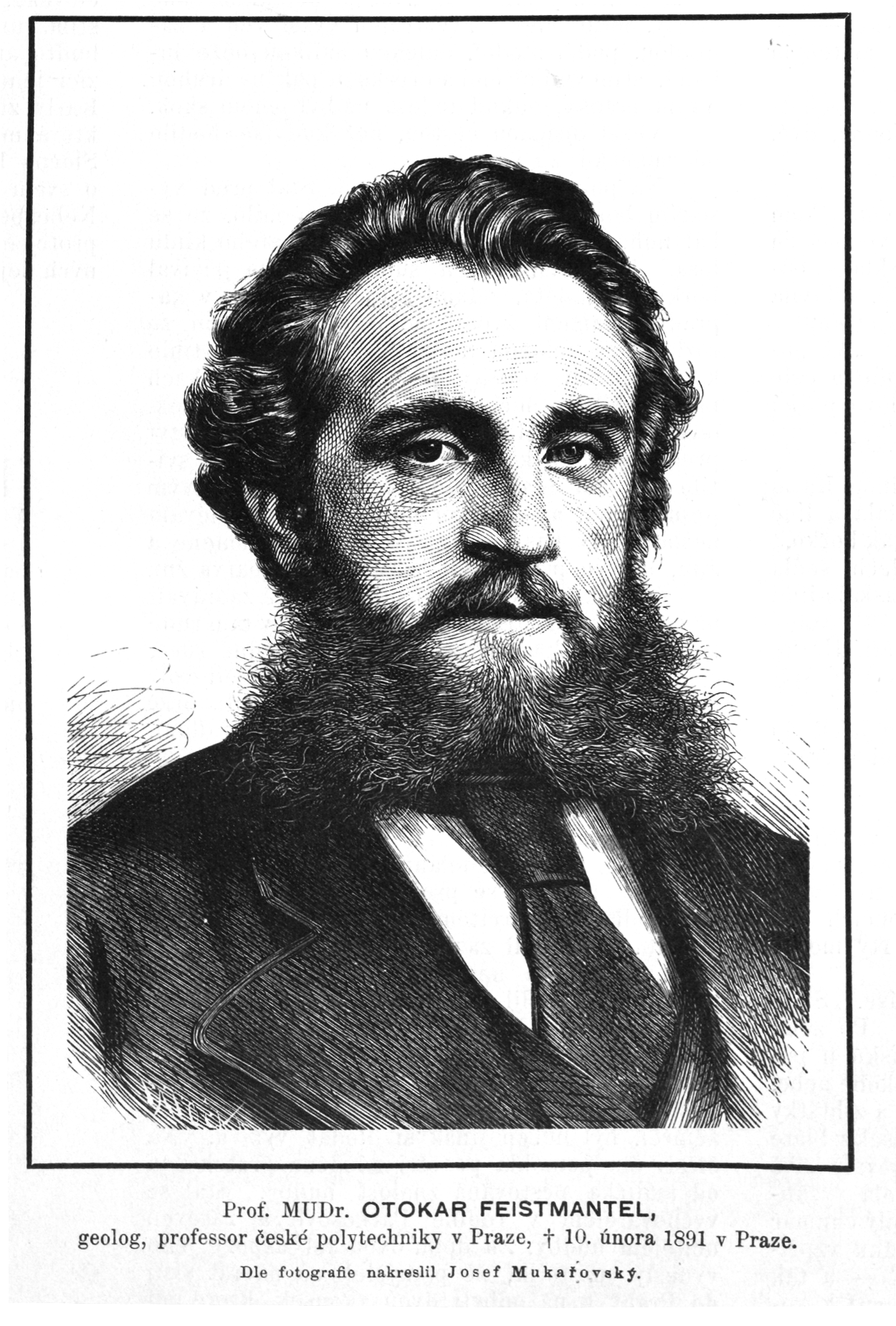

Otokar Eduard Franz Karel Feistmantel (other spellings include Otakar Feistmantl; 20 November 1848 – 10 February 1891) was a Czech-Austrian geologist and paleontologist. He studied in Prague and Berlin and worked with the Geological Survey of India in India, where he replaced Ferdinand Stoliczka who died of altitude sickness on an expedition in 1874. Feistmantel described several genera and species of fossil plants from peninsular India, and his work on the "Gondwana Series" contributed to the development of the idea of the ancient supercontinent of Gondwanaland.

== Early life ==
Otokar was the second son of Karel Feistmantel (1819–1885), an expert on iron smelting who later took an interest in geology and palaeontology and Františka, née Nechvátalová. Although most records note that he was born on 20 November 1848 in Stará Huť, Bohemia, Austrian Empire (today a part of Hýskov) near Beroun in the Czech Republic), he recorded it as 21 November in an unpublished autobiographical note. Although of German ancestry, Otokar's father spoke Czech at home and supported Czech nationalism. He received his early schooling at Křivoklát Castle and after his father moved to Břasy, he studied at Prague. He graduated from the Nové Město grammar school in 1867 and attended Prague University (Charles-Ferdinand University) to study medicine. His interest in science was nurtured by his father's circle of friends who included the geologist Jan Krejčí, biologist Antonín Frič, and cartographer Karl Kořistka.

== Work in Europe ==
Feistmantel spent some time at the National Museum at Prague in 1868 organizing the Sternberg collection and in 1869, he accompanied Jan Krejčí to the coal mines in the Krkonoše mountains. He continued his medical studies with an internship and military service in 1872 at a military hospital and graduated in August 1873 as a doctor of general medicine. He however maintained a keen interest in geology throughout his student life, and after graduation, he was assisted by Kořistka to obtain a position at the Imperial Geological Institute at Vienna to work on an exhibit for the World Exhibition showing the fuel reserves of Austria. A vacancy at the University of Wrocław to assist Professor Ferdinand von Roemer opened up in June 1873, and Otokar was able to obtain this position. By this time Feistmantel had published a large number of papers and was a member of several scholarly societies including the German geological society in Berlin and the Royal Czech Society of Sciences. Feistmantel had met Thomas Oldham in the Vienna exhibition, and when Ferdinand Stoliczka died of altitude sickness on an expedition, there was an opening at the Geological Survey of India. Feistmantel tended to be rash in his personal interactions and this led to him being at loggerheads with many other geologists. He took the offer in Calcutta (with a pay of Rs 300 a month and a one-time outfitting allowance of £40), marrying Berta née Pichlerová (24 June 1853 – 10 February 1929), despite suggestions from Oldham that he needs to make suitable prior arrangements at Calcutta first.

== Work in India ==
Feistmantel and his wife Berta arrived in March 1875 and were initially housed in a room in the local Madrasa school that belonged to its German headmaster Blochmann. After the birth of his daughter, he moved to a larger home at 10 Sudder Street. Work in India included expeditions to central and eastern India, and on these trips, he maintained careful notes and made sketches of tribal life that he intended to publish in a book. One of the major tasks was mapping coal reserves, and by 1880, this was completed. Although he continued making studies, he ran into conflicts with the director H. B. Medlicott as well as other colleagues. The English referred to him in jest as the Bohemian. He made a trip back to Prague in 1878 with his wife and their two children, a girl Berta and a boy Ottokar who were born in Calcutta. He left his wife and children in Prague and returned to India with the Indian servant who had accompanied him. Feistmantel made several expeditions in this period before his family joined back in 1879. A second daughter and third child, Emmanuela, was born in 1880. In 1881, he was awarded a prize at the Melbourne International Exhibition for his work on the Australian fossil flora and around this time he obtained a faculty position at the Czech Polytechnic School in Prague but continued to work in India. Feistmantel tried to obtain a job in India for his paleontologist cousin Otomar Pravoslav Novák around 1882. He retired in 1883 to return to Prague and continued his researches at the Czech Technical College. In May 1884 he held an exhibition on India at the Prague water tower at Karlovy Lázně. The family grew in Prague with the birth of another daughter Marie and a son František.

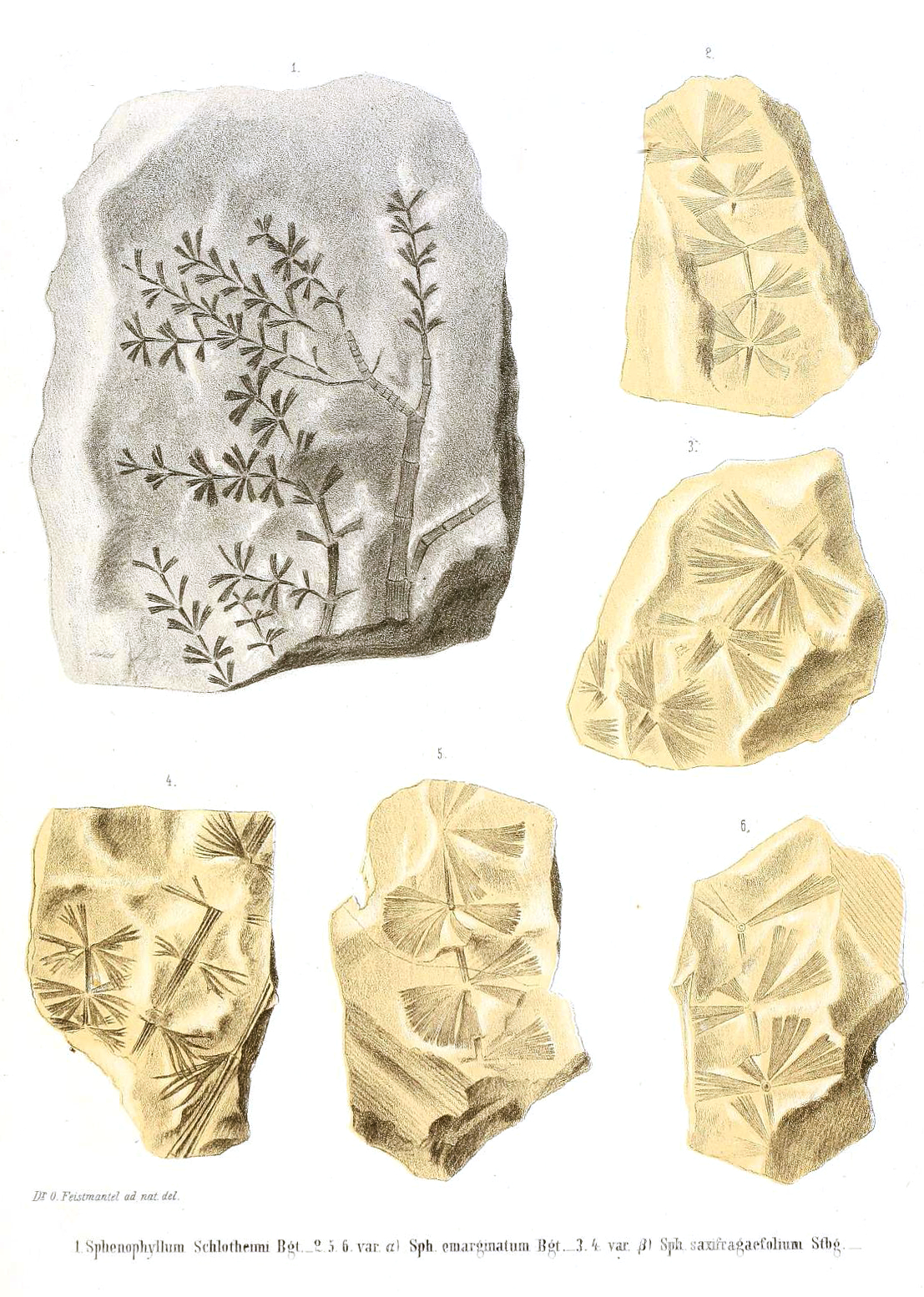
Illustrations of Sphenophyllum by Feistmantel

Apart from his official work in India, Feistmantel wrote letters on life in India to newspapers in Prague. In his 1884 book titled "Osm let ve Východní Indií" (Eight years in East India) based on his eight years of life in India, he described the nature of his work and the land and people that he encountered in his travels. Expeditions were supported by servants and there were three tents, one for him, one for the servants, and one for the kitchen. Their luggage was carried on elephants and he himself often rode on one (of three). Feistmantel was particularly fascinated by the tribal Gonds and Santals. He admired that they were open, direct and honest. He noted that the non-tribal village people were, in contrast, often unsupportive of the travelling geologists. They apparently did not provide food as ordered by government letters to the travelling teams and sometimes force in the form of whipping had to be used against villagers. Life in Calcutta during that period, he noted, was pleasant and safe, with servants attending to most work and leaving him free to pursue his interests. He also appreciated the joys of outdoor life and the freedom with which he could shoot when on expeditions, something reserved for royalty back in Europe. He observed that the European leisure life in Calcutta revolved around the beach, which served as a center that he compared with the Prater in Vienna. He noted that the beach was packed in the evenings with Europeans arriving in carriages, wearing fine clothes and women riding horses.

He became unwell in 1890 and died in Prague on 10 February 1891 of bowel cancer. He was buried at Vyšehrad cemetery. His wife died on 10 February 1929. They had daughters Berta (b. 1875), Emmanuela (or Amra) (b. 1880), Marie (b. 1884), and sons Ottokar (b. 1877), and František (b. 1887). The collections of artefacts he made from India are now part of the Náprstek Museum. Feistmantel Valley in Antarctica was named in his honour.

== Works ==
Feistmantel published his work-related research mainly in the records of the Geological Survey of India. He also published on other matters and a partial list includes:

- Steinkohlenflora von Kralup in Böhmen (1871)
- Palaeozoische und mesozoische Flora des ostlichen Australiens (1878)
- Politické zřízení Východní Indie Britské ("A political history of British India", 1887)
- Die theekultur in Britisch-Ost-Indien (1888)
