= Nowakiidae =

Nowakiidae Temporal range: 443.7–376.1 Ma

Scientific classification
- Kingdom: Animalia
- Class: †Tentaculita
- Order: †Nowakiida
- Family: †Nowakiidae; Ljaschenko, 1955

Genera
- Alexiella†; Cepanonowakia†; Dmitriella†; Kinderlina†; Nowakia†; Stylionowakia†; Sulcatonowakia†; Turkestanella†; Variella†; Viriatellina†

Nowakiidae is an extinct family of free-living animals from the order Nowakiida.
