= Nový Jáchymov =

- Municipality
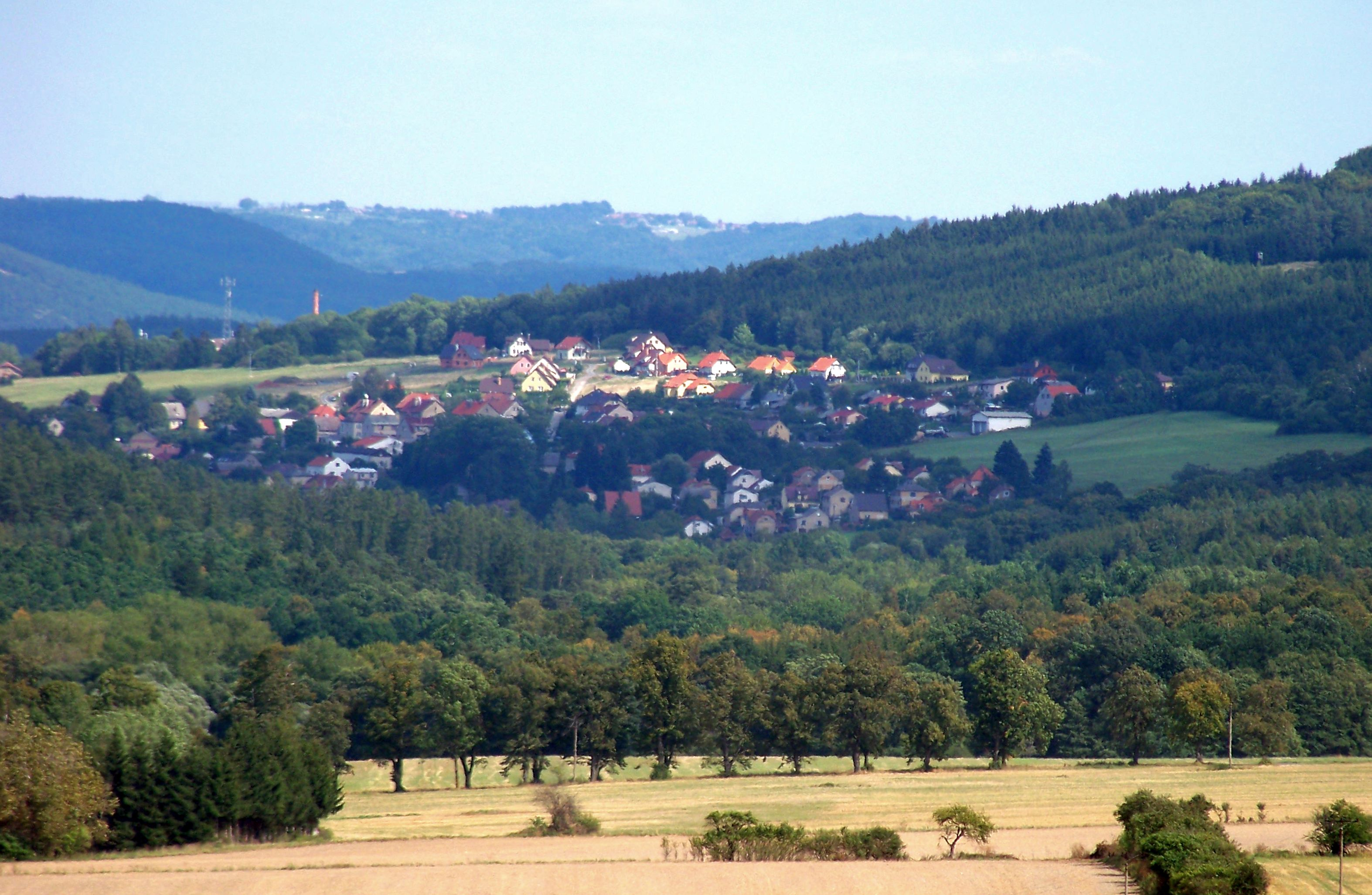
- General view

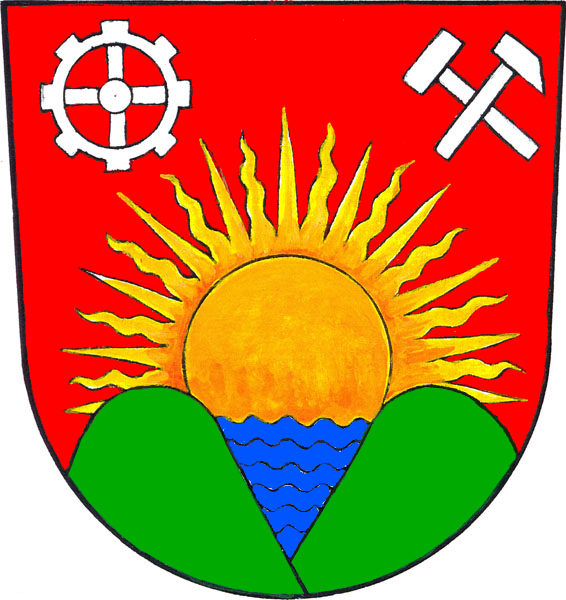
- Flag Coat of arms

- Location in the Czech Republic
- Coordinates: 49°58′51″N 13°56′36″E
- Country: Czech Republic
- Region: Central Bohemian
- District: Beroun
- Founded: 1810

Area
  - Total: 4.97 km^{2} (1.92 sq mi)
- Elevation: 374 m (1,227 ft)

Population (2026-01-01)
  - Total: 755
  - Density: 152/km^{2} (393/sq mi)
- Time zone: UTC+1 (CET)
  - Summer (DST): UTC+2 (CEST)
- Postal code: 267 03
- Website: www.obecnovyjachymov.cz

Nový Jáchymov is a municipality and village in Beroun District in the Central Bohemian Region of the Czech Republic. It has about 800 inhabitants.

== History ==
Nový Jáchymov was founded in 1810, which makes it one of the youngest settlements in the region.

== Demographics ==
Historical population
Year	Pop.	±%
1869	774	—
1880	481	−37.9%
1890	443	−7.9%
1900	442	−0.2%
1910	452	+2.3%
1921	502	+11.1%
1930	533	+6.2%
1950	382	−28.3%
1961	646	+69.1%
1970	629	−2.6%
1980	566	−10.0%
1991	484	−14.5%
2001	526	+8.7%
2011	673	+27.9%
2021	714	+6.1%
Source: Censuses
