= Nowakiida =

Nowakiida Temporal range: 443.7–376.1 Ma

Scientific classification
- Kingdom: Animalia
- Class: †Tentaculita
- Subclass: †Dacryoconarida
- Order: †Nowakiida; Ljaschenko, 1955

Families
- Crassilinidae†; Nowakiidae†; Peneauiidae†; Striatostyliolinidae†; Undastriatostyliolinidae†

Nowakiida is an extinct order of free living animals from the Dacryoconarida subclass.
