= Silicification =

Geological petrification process

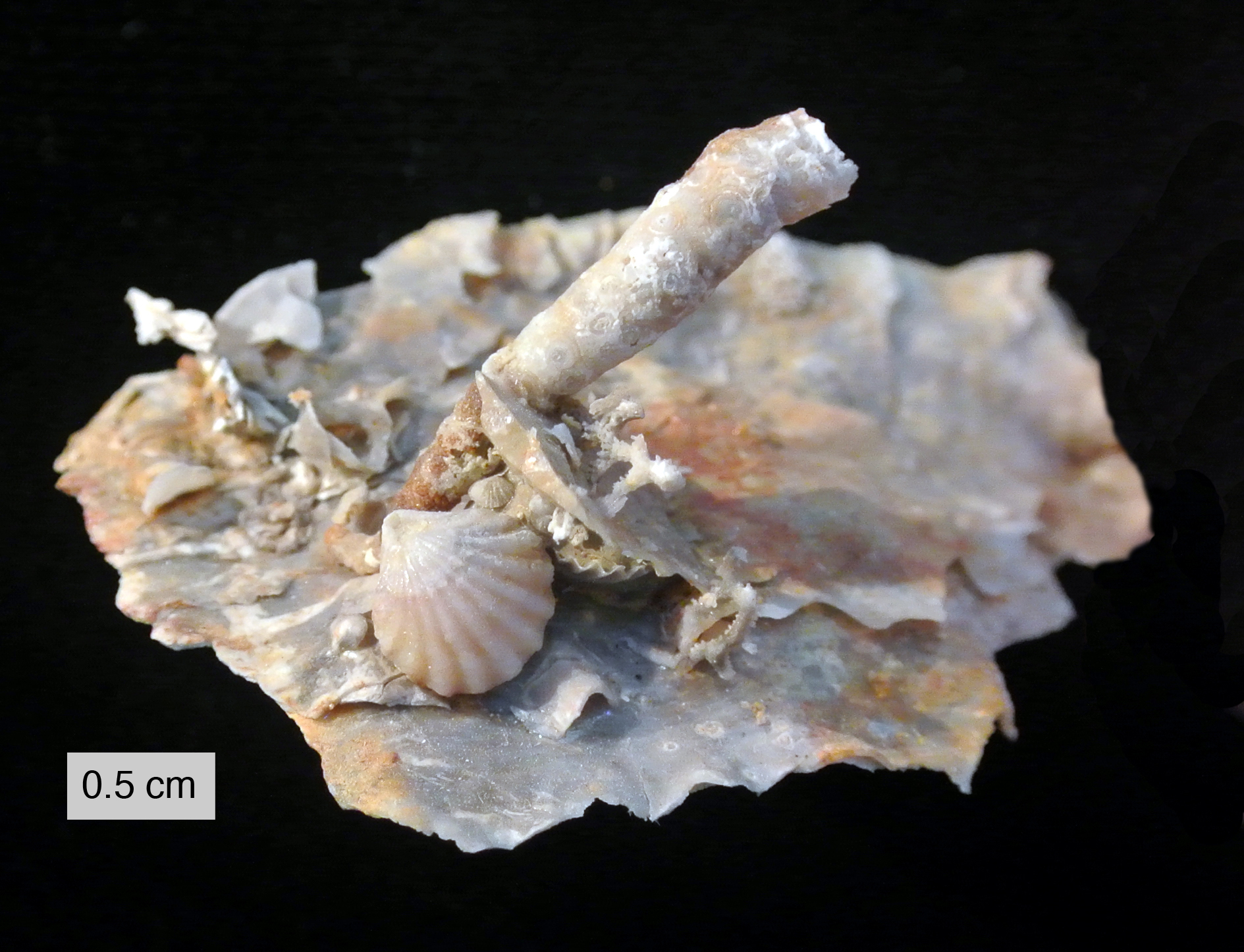
Silicified fossils from the Middle Permian Road Canyon Formation, Glass Mountains, Texas.

In geology, silicification is a process in which silica-rich fluids seep into the voids of Earth materials, e.g., rocks, wood, bones, shells, and replace the original materials with silica (SiO_{2}). Silica is a naturally existing and abundant compound found in organic and inorganic materials, including Earth's crust and mantle. There are a variety of silicification mechanisms. In silicification of wood, silica permeates into and occupies cracks and voids in wood such as vessels and cell walls. The original organic matter is retained throughout the process and will gradually decay through time. In the silicification of carbonates, silica replaces carbonates by the same volume. Replacement is accomplished through the dissolution of original rock minerals and the precipitation of silica. This leads to a removal of original materials out of the system. Depending on the structures and composition of the original rock, silica might replace only specific mineral components of the rock. Silicic acid (H_{4}SiO_{4}) in the silica-enriched fluids forms lenticular, nodular, fibrous, or aggregated quartz, opal, or chalcedony that grows within the rock. Silicification happens when rocks or organic materials are in contact with silica-rich surface water, buried under sediments and susceptible to groundwater flow, or buried under volcanic ashes. Silicification is often associated with hydrothermal processes. Temperature for silicification ranges in various conditions: in burial or surface water conditions, temperature for silicification can be around 25°−50°; whereas temperatures for siliceous fluid inclusions can be up to 150°−190°. Silicification could occur during a syn-depositional or a post-depositional stage, commonly along layers marking changes in sedimentation such as unconformities or bedding planes.

== Sources of silica ==
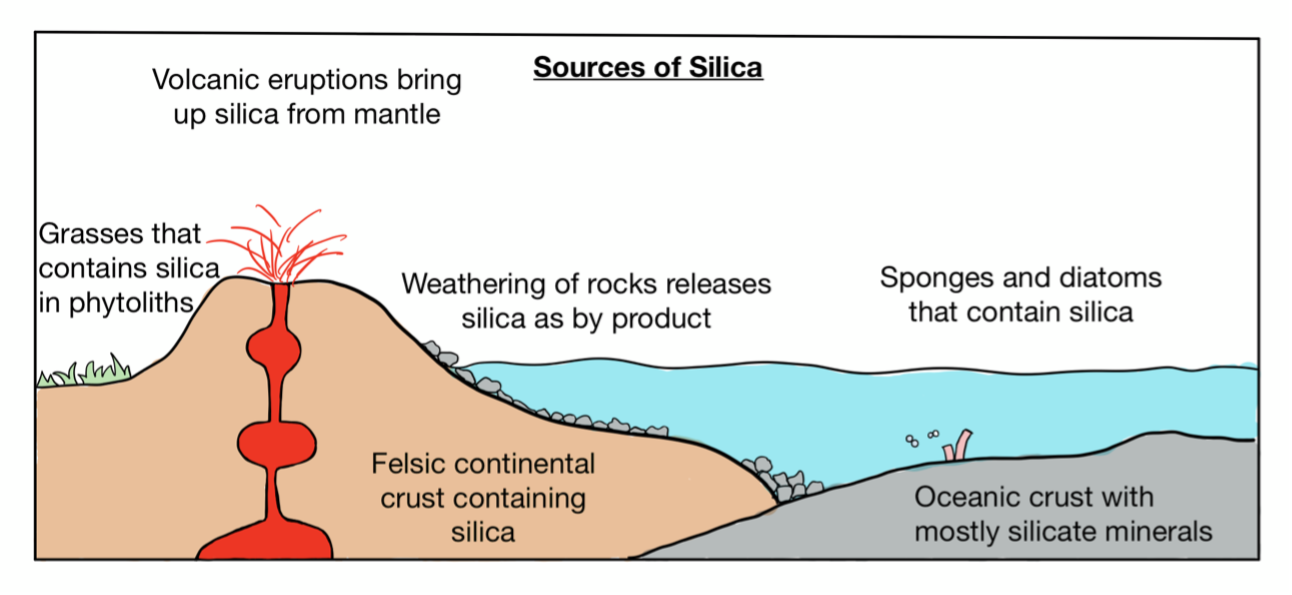
A simplified diagram explaining the sources of silica for silicification. Phytoliths in grasses, sponges and diatoms are the biogenic sources of silica. Phytoliths usually provide continental source of silica while sponges and diatoms are marine silica sources. Lithological silica are brought to surface through volcanic events whereas weathering of pre-existing rocks releases silica into the waters.

The sources of silica can be divided into two categories: silica in organic and inorganic materials. The former category is also known as biogenic silica, which is a ubiquitous material in animals and plants. The latter category is the second most abundant element in Earth's crust. Silicate minerals are the major components of 95% of presently identified rocks.

=== Biology ===
Biogenic silica is the major source of silica for diagenesis. One of the prominent examples is the presence of silica in phytoliths in the leaves of plants, i.e. grasses, and Equisetaceae. Some suggested that silica present in phytoliths can serve as a defense mechanism against the herbivores, where the presence of silica in leaves increases the difficulty in digestion, harming the fitness of herbivores. However, evidence on the effects of silica on the wellbeing of animals and plants is still insufficient.

Besides, sponges are another biogenic source of naturally occurring silica in animals. They belong to the phylum Porifera in the classification system. Silicious sponges are commonly found with silicified sedimentary layers, for example in the Yanjiahe Formation in South China. Some of them occur as sponge spicules and are associated with microcrystalline quartz or other carbonates after silicification. It could also be the main source of precipitative beds such as cherts beds or cherts in petrified woods.

Diatoms, an important group of microalgae living in marine environments, contribute significantly to the source of diagenetic silica. They have cell walls made of silica, also known as diatom frustules. In some silicified sedimentary rocks, fossils of diatoms are unearthed. This suggests that diatoms frustules were sources of silica for silicification. Some examples are silicified limestones of Miocene Astoria Formation in Washington, silicified ignimbrite in El Tatio Geyser Field in Chile, and Tertiary siliceous sedimentary rocks in western pacific deep sea drills. The presence of biogenic silica in various species creates a large-scale marine silica cycle that circulates silica through the ocean. Silica content is therefore high in active silica upwelling areas in the deep-marine sediments. Besides, carbonate shells that deposited in shallow marine environments enrich silica contents at continental shelf areas.

=== Geology ===
The major component of the Earth's upper mantle is silica (SiO_{2}), which makes it the primary source of silica in hydrothermal fluids. SiO_{2} is a stable component. It often appears as quartz in volcanic rocks. Some quartz that is derived from pre-existing rocks, appear in the form of sand and detrital quartz that interact with seawater to produce siliceous fluids. In some cases, silica in siliceous rocks are subjected to hydrothermal alteration and react with seawater at certain temperatures, forming an acidic solution for silicification of nearby materials. In the rock cycle, the chemical weathering of rocks also releases silica in the form of silicic acid as by-products. Silica from weathered rocks is washed into waters and deposit into shallow-marine environments.

== Mechanisms of silicification ==
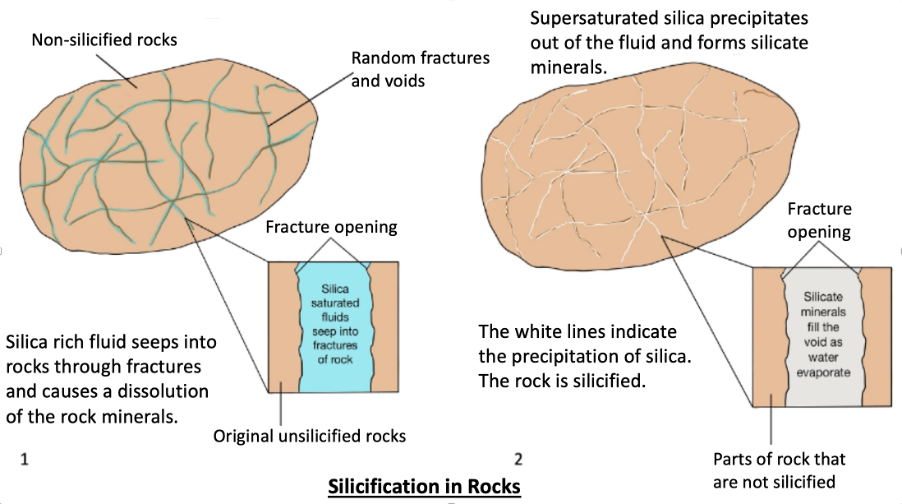
This diagram shows the mechanics of silicification through dissolution of rock materials and precipitation of silica. Silica enriched fluids are usually supersaturated with silica so that when they seep into voids, silica precipitate out. On the other hand, these fluids are relatively undersaturated with other rock minerals, which leads to a dissolution of the minerals. These materials are carried away by the fluids and are replaced by silica.

The presence of hydrothermal fluids is essential as a medium for geochemical reactions during silicification. In the silicification of different materials, different mechanisms are involved. In the silicification of rock materials like carbonates, replacement of minerals through hydrothermal alteration is common; while the silicification of organic materials such as woods is solely a process of permeation.

=== Replacement ===
The replacement of silica involves two processes:

1) Dissolution of rock minerals

2) Precipitation of silica

It could be explained through the carbonate-silica replacement. Hydrothermal fluids are undersaturated with carbonates and supersaturated with silica. When carbonate rocks get in contact with hydrothermal fluids, due to the difference in gradient, carbonates from the original rock dissolve into the fluid whereas silica precipitate out of it. The carbonate that dissolved is therefore pulled out from the system while the silica precipitated recrystallizes into various silicate minerals, depending on the silica phase. The solubility of silica strongly depends on the temperature and pH value of the environment where pH9 is the controlling value. Under a condition of pH lower than 9, silica precipitates out of the fluid; when the pH value is above 9, silica becomes highly soluble.

=== Permeation ===
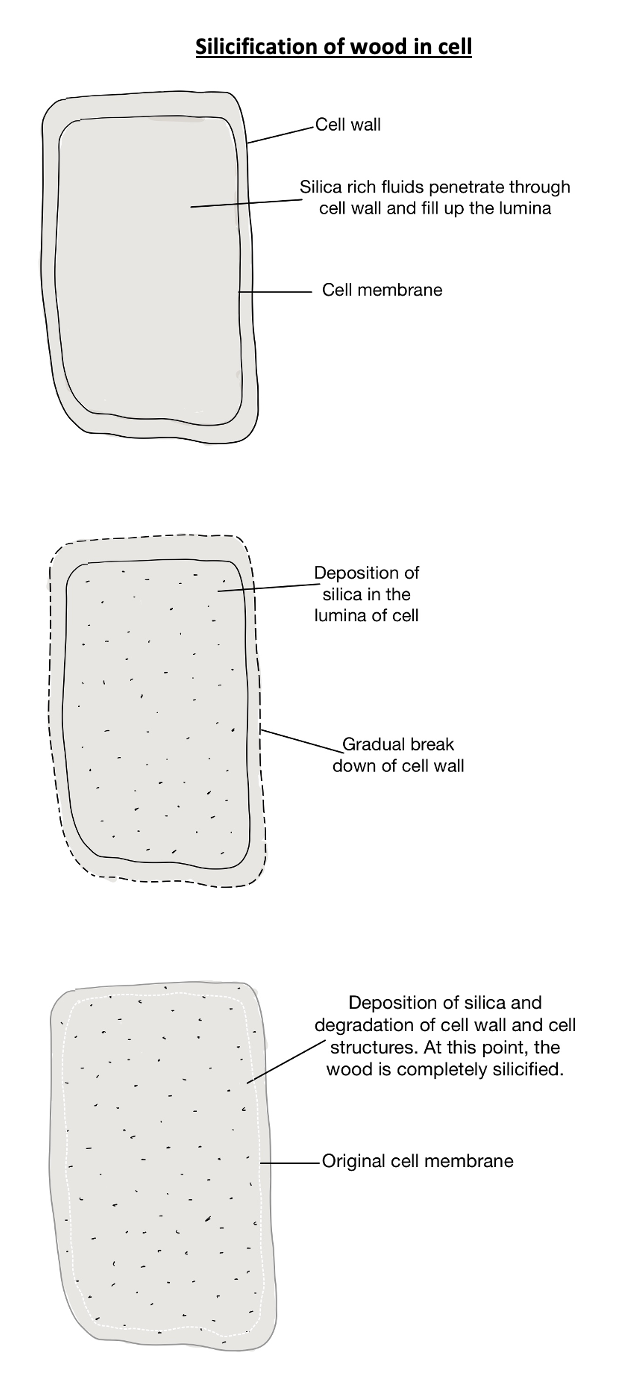
This diagram shows the mechanism of silicification of wood in a cell. Silica penetrates through the cell wall. Cell structures gradually deteriorate and silica deposits in the entire cell. Adapted and modified from Furuno,1986 and Fengel, 1991.

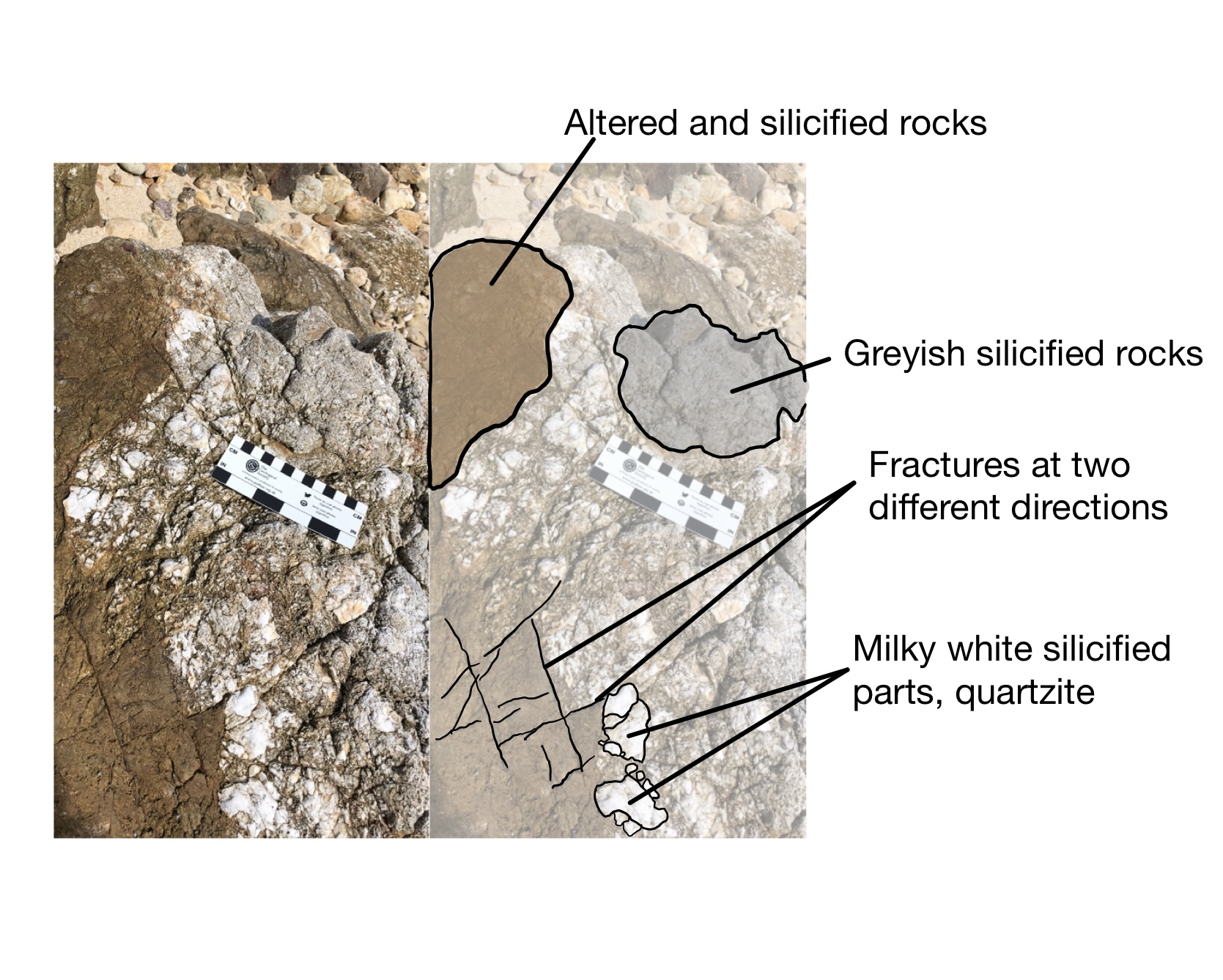
Left: Silicified hydrothermal breccia. The greyish white parts have undergone silicification. Right: Annotated diagram of the left image, showing features of a silicified breccia.

In the silicification of woods, silica dissolves in hydrothermal fluid and seeps into lignin in cell walls. Precipitation of silica out of the fluids produces silica deposition within the voids, especially in the cell walls. Cell materials are broken down by the fluids, yet the structure remains stable due to the development of minerals. Cell structures are slowly replaced by silica. Continuous penetration of siliceous fluids results in different stages of silicification i.e. primary and secondary. The loss of fluids over time leads to the cementation of silicified woods through late silica addition.

The rate of silicification depends on a few factors:

1) Rate of breakage of original cells

2) Availability of silica sources and silica content in the fluid

3) Temperature and pH of silicification environment

4) Interference of other diagenetic processes

These factors affect the silicification process in many ways. The rate of breakage of original cells controls the development of the mineral framework, hence the replacement of silica. Availability of silica directly determines the silica content in fluids. The higher the silica content, the faster silicification could take place. The same concept applies to the availability of hydrothermal fluids. The temperature and pH of the environment determine the condition for silicification to occur. This is closely connected to the burial depth or association with volcanic events. Interference of other diagenetic processes could sometimes create disturbance to silicification. The relative time of silicification to other geological processes could serve as a reference for further geological interpretations.

== Examples ==
=== Volcanic rocks ===
In the Conception Bay in Newfoundland, Southeastern coast of Canada, a series of Pre-Cambrian to Cambrian-linked volcanic rocks were silicified. The rocks mainly consist of rhyolitic and basaltic flows, with crystal tuffs and breccia interbedded. Regional silicification was taken place as a preliminary alteration process before other geochemical processes occurred. The source of silica near the area was from hot siliceous fluids from rhyolitic flow under a static condition. A significant portion of silica appeared in the form of white chalcedonic quartz, quartz veins as well as granular quartz crystal. Due to the difference in rock structures, silica replaces different materials in rocks of close locations. The following table shows the replacement of silica at different localities:

Replacement of Different Materials during Silicification in Newfoundland
Location	Material Replaced	Form of silica
Manuels	Spherulites of rhyolites	Chalcedonic quartz
Clarenville	Groundmass of rocks	Chalcedonic quartz with sericite along glassy cracks

=== Metamorphic rocks ===
In the Semail Nappe of Oman in the United Arb Emirates, silicified serpentinite was found. The occurrence of such geological features is rather unusual. It is a pseudomorphic alteration where the protolith of serpentinite was already silicified. Due to tectonic events, basal serpentinite was fractured and groundwater permeated along the faults, forming a large-scale circulation of groundwater within the strata. Through hydrothermal dissolution, silica precipitated and crystallized around the voids of serpentinite. Therefore, silicification can only be seen along groundwater paths. The silicification of serpentinite was formed under the condition where groundwater flow and carbon dioxide concentration are low.

=== Carbonates ===
Silicified carbonates can appear as silicified carbonate rock layers, or in the form of silicified karsts. The Paleogene Madrid Basin in Central Spain is a foreland basin resulted from the Alpine uplift, an example of silicified carbonates in rock layers. The lithology consists of carbonate and detritus units that were formed in a lacustrine environment. The rock units are silicified where cherts, quartz, and opaline minerals are found in the layers. It is conformable with the underlying evaporitic beds, also dated from similar ages. It is found that there were two stages of silicification within the rock strata. The earlier stage of silicification provided a better condition and site for the precipitation of silica. The source of silica is still uncertain. There are no biogenic silica detected from the carbonates. However, microbial films in carbonates are found, which could suggest the presence of diatoms.

Karsts are carbonate caves formed from a dissolution of carbonate rocks such as limestones and dolomites. They are usually susceptible to groundwater and are dissolved in these drainage. Silicified karsts and cave deposits are formed when siliceous fluids enter karsts through faults and cracks. The Mid-Proterozoic Mescal Limestone from the Apache Group in central Arizona is classic examples of silicified karsts. A portion of the carbonates are replaced by cherts in early diagenesis and the remaining portion is completely silicified in later stages. The source of silica in carbonates are usually associated with the presence of biogenetic silica; however, the source of silica in Mescal Limestone is from weathering of overlying basalts, which are extrusive igneous rocks that have high silica content.

=== Silicified woods ===
Silicification of woods usually occur in terrestrial conditions, but sometimes it could be done in aquatic environments. Surface water silicification can be done through the precipitation of silica in silica-enriched hot springs. On the northern coast of central Japan, the Tateyama hot spring has a high silica content that contributes to the silicification of nearby fallen woods and organic materials. Silica precipitates rapidly out of the fluids and opal is the main form of silica. With a temperature of around 70 °C and a pH value of around 3, the opal deposited is composed of silica spheres of different sizes arranged randomly.

== Early silicification ==
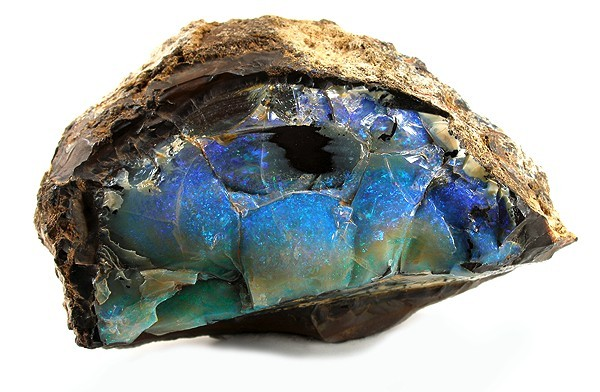
Opal embedded in jasper

Mafic magma dominated the seafloor at around 3.9 Ga during the Hadean-Archean transition. Due to rapid silicification, the felsic continental crust began to form. In the Archean, the continental crust was composed of tonalite–trondhjemite–granodiorite (TTG) as well as granite–monzonite–syenite suites.

The Mount Goldsworthy in the Pilbara Craton located in Western Australia holds one of the earliest silicification example with an Archean clastic meta-sedimentary rock sequence, revealing the surface environment of the Earth in the early times with evidence from silicification and hydrothermal alteration. The unearthed rocks are found to be SiO2 dominant in terms of mineral composition. The succession was subjected to a high degree of silicification due to hydrothermal interaction with seawater at low temperatures. Lithic fragments were replaced with microcrystalline quartz and protoliths were altered during silicification. The condition of silicification and the elements that were present suggested that the surface temperature and carbon dioxide contents were high during either or both syn-deposition and post-deposition.

The Barberton Greenstone Belt in South Africa, specifically the Eswatini Supergroup of around 3.5–3.2 Ga, is a suite of well-preserved silicified volcanic-sedimentary rocks. With the composition ranging from ultramafic to felsic, the silicified volcanic rocks are directly beneath the bedded chert layer. Rocks are more silicified near the bedded chert contact, suggesting a relationship between chert deposition and silicification. The silica altered zones reveal that hydrothermal activities, as in seawater circulation, actively circulate the rock layers through fractures and fault during the deposition of bedded chert. The seawater was heated up and therefore picked up silicious materials from underneath volcanic origin. The silica enriched fluids bring about silicification of rocks through seeping into porous materials in the syn-depositional stage at a low-temperature condition.

== See also ==
- Metasomatism
- Permineralization
- Pseudomorph
- Silica cycle
