= Joachim Barrande =

French palaeontologist (1799–1883)

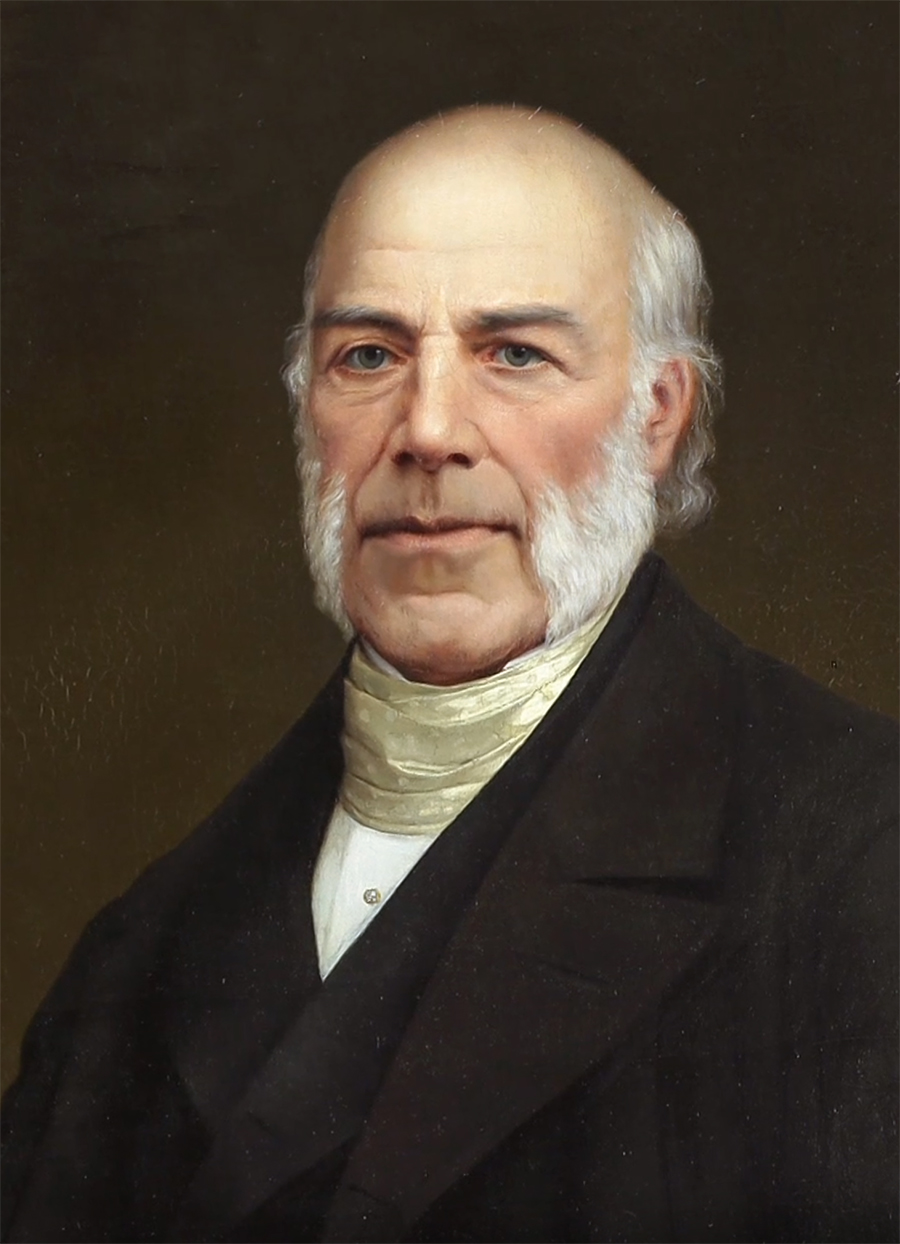
- Portrait of Barrande crerated in 1884
- Born: 11 August 1799; Saugues, Haute Loire
- Died: 5 October 1883 (aged 84); Frohsdorf, Austria-Hungary
- Education: École Polytechnique
- Awards: Wollaston Medal (1857)
- Scientific career
- Fields: geology palaeontology
- Author abbrev. (botany): Barrande

Signature
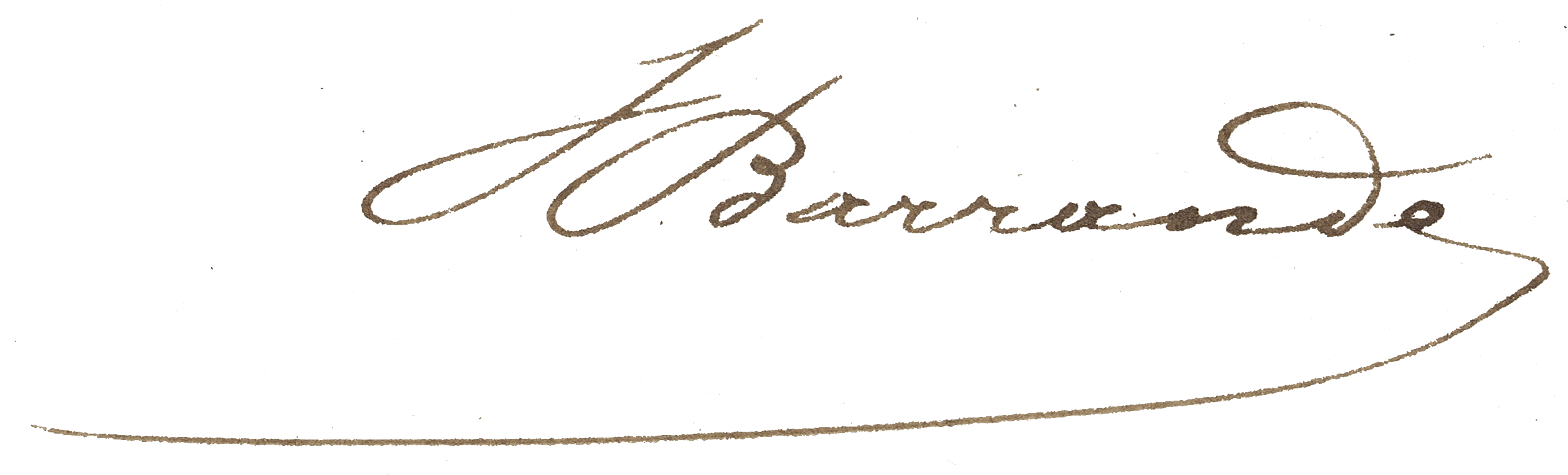

Joachim Barrande (11 August 1799 – 5 October 1883) was a French geologist and palaeontologist. He was particularly known for his work on trilobites, published in the Systéme Silurien de la Bohéme which he published in 22 parts. Trained under the school of Georges Cuvier, he opposed the evolutionary views of Charles Darwin.

== Life and career ==
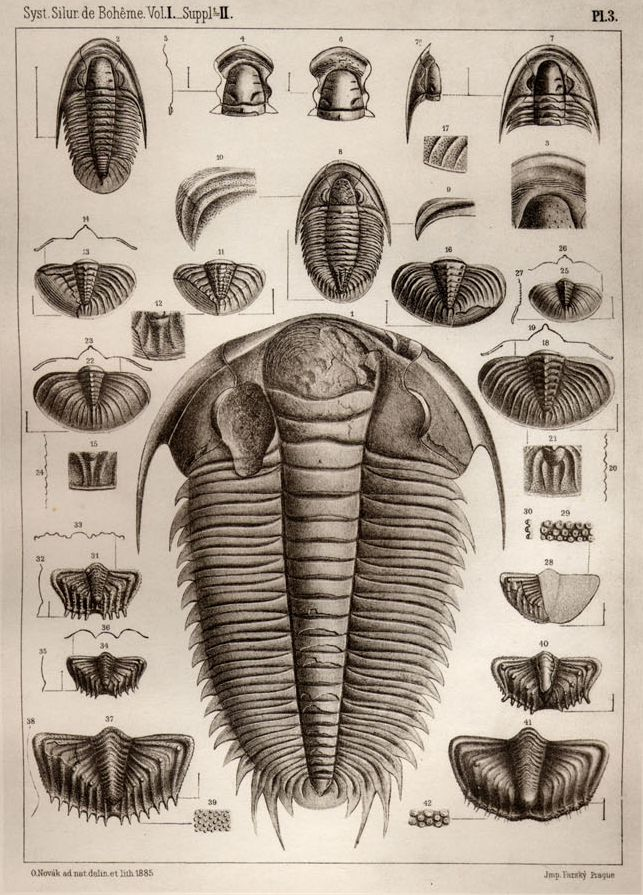
Plate from Système silurien du centre de la Bohême

Barrande was born on the family estate at Saugues, Haute Loire, and he was educated in the École Polytechnique and École Nationale des Ponts et Chaussées at Paris. He attended the lectures of Georges Cuvier, Brongniart, Jussieu, Prevost, Serres, Auduoin, and de Blainville. He received the training of an engineer and was initially appointed engineer at Decize where he built an aqueduct over the Loire. While living in Decize he was introduced to Louis-Antoine de Bourbon, duke d'Angoulême and he was then appointed tutor to family of the duc de Bordeaux (afterwards known as the comte de Chambord), grandson of Charles X. He set up a laboratory for their education at Tuileries that was later destroyed. When the king abdicated in 1830, Barrande accompanied the royal exiles to England and Scotland, and afterwards to Prague. Settling in that city in 1831, he became occupied in engineering works, and his attention was then attracted to the fossils from the Lower Palaeozoic rocks of Bohemia. He began to build up a collection at his home Kleinseite No. 419, Chotekgasse. He also had a house in Paris. Apart from French, he mastered English, German and Czech.

The publication in 1839 of Murchison's Silurian System incited Barrande to carry on systematic researches on the equivalent strata in Bohemia. For ten years (1840–1850) he made a detailed study of these rocks, engaging workmen specially to collect fossils, and in this way he obtained upwards of 3500 species of graptolites, brachiopoda, mollusca, trilobites and fishes. The first volume of his great work, Système silurien du centre de la Bohême (dealing with trilobites, several genera, including Deiphon, which he personally described), appeared in 1852; and from that date until 1881, he issued twenty-one quarto volumes of text and plates. Two other volumes were issued after his death in 1887 and 1894. It is estimated that he spent nearly £10,000 on these works. In addition he published a large number of separate papers.

In recognition of his important researches the Geological Society of London in 1857 awarded to him the Wollaston medal. In 1862, he was elected as a member to the American Philosophical Society. In 1870, he was elected a foreign member of the Royal Swedish Academy of Sciences. He was elected a Foreign Honorary Member of the American Academy of Arts and Sciences in 1875.

Barrande died at Frohsdorf on 5 October 1883 after suffering from a lung infection. His extensive collection has been stored in National Museum in Prague on grounds of his testament.

In 1884 the Silurian strata at Kuchelbad was named as Barrande rock and a slab with his name was placed on it. This was done by Anton Fritsch and other Czech scientists. On 24 February 1928, the Barrandov district of Prague was named after him.

== Opposition to evolution ==
Barrande was an advocate of the theory of catastrophes (as taught by Georges Cuvier). He later opposed Charles Darwin's theory of evolution. He rejected transmutation of species. He also wrote a five-volume book on the defense of his theory of so-called "colonies", presuming that the cause of the presence of fossils typical for one layer surrounded by those typical for another is atectonical. He tended to name those colonies with names of his scientific adversaries. The opponents included Jan Krejčí, Marko Vincenc Lipold and John Edward Marr.

Barrande also took part victoriously in the dispute concerning the independence of the so-called Taconic System in North America, ending a discussion of many years by proving that the fauna which was discovered by Emmons and Marcou represented his primordial Cambrian fauna.

His anti-evolutionary views were criticized by geologist Henry Hicks who commented that "Barrande is well known to be a determined opponent to the theory of evolution, and doubtless this strong bias has prevented him from seeing and accepting many facts which would otherwise, to so keen and careful an observer, have seemed inconsistent with such strong views."
