= Lowther Island =

Canadian Arctic island

- Location within Nunavut Location within Canada

Geography
- Location: Northern Canada
- Coordinates: 74°33′N 097°30′W
- Archipelago: Queen Elizabeth Islands; Arctic Archipelago
- Area: 145 km^{2} (56 sq mi)

Administration
- Canada
- Territory: Nunavut

Demographics
- Population: Uninhabited

Lowther Island lies within the Arctic Archipelago in the Qikiqtaaluk Region of northern Canada's territory of Nunavut. It is one of the mid-channel islands in the western sector of Barrow Strait. Bathurst Island and Cornwallis Island are to the north, while Prince of Wales Island is to the south. The island is clustered within a group of uninhabited islands. It is 15.5 mi (24.9 km) northeast of Young Island, separated by the Kettle Passage, a shipping route, and 13 mi (21 km) southeast of Garrett Island, separated by Hayes Channel.

Lowther Island is 17 mi (27 km) long, 2–6 mi (3.2–9.7 km) wide, and 145 km^{2} (56 sq mi). It is rimmed by raised beaches, the highest being at 106.5 m (349 ft). above sea level. Gourdeau Point is on the island's south side, and Lowther Shoal is to the south/southeast.

== History ==
The first European to sight the island was William Edward Parry in 1819. It is named after a relative of Hugh Lowther, 5th Earl of Lonsdale (who visited Lowther Island himself), that worked for the Hudson's Bay Company.

In August 1852, ÉMile-Frédéric de Bray, searching for Sir John Franklin, spent a week at Lowther Island and close by Griffith Island. The island was also visited by Francis Leopold McClintock as part of Capt. Henry Kellett's 1852 to 1854 expedition.
