= Jan Krejčí =

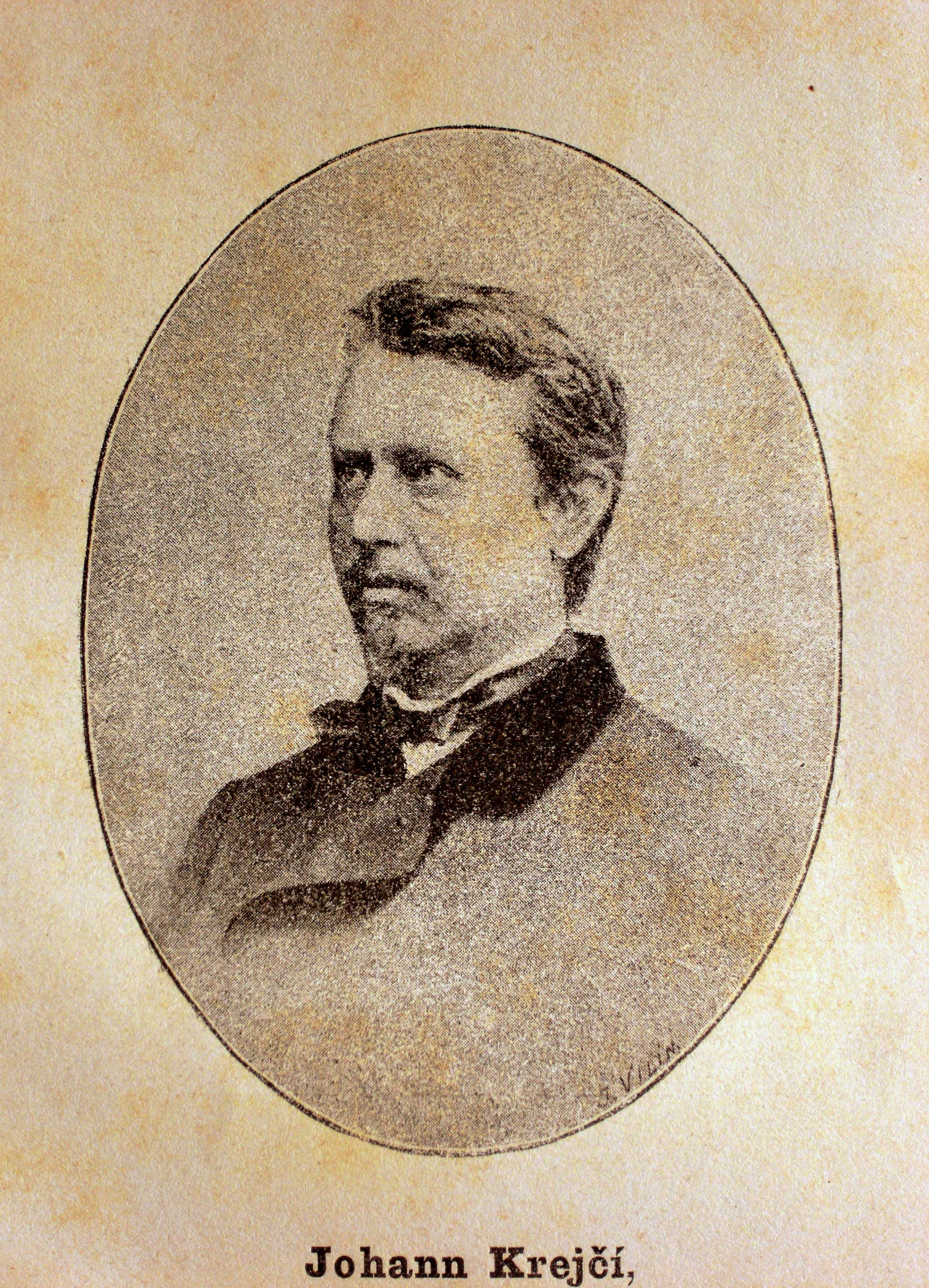
Portrait of Krejčí

Jan Krejčí (28 February 1825 – 1 August 1887) was a Czech geologist, educator, journalist and politician. He wrote the first Czech textbook of geology in 1860, whose revised edition was released again in 1877 under the title Geologie čili nauka o tvarech zemských se zvláštním ohledem na krajiny Československé.

== Biography ==
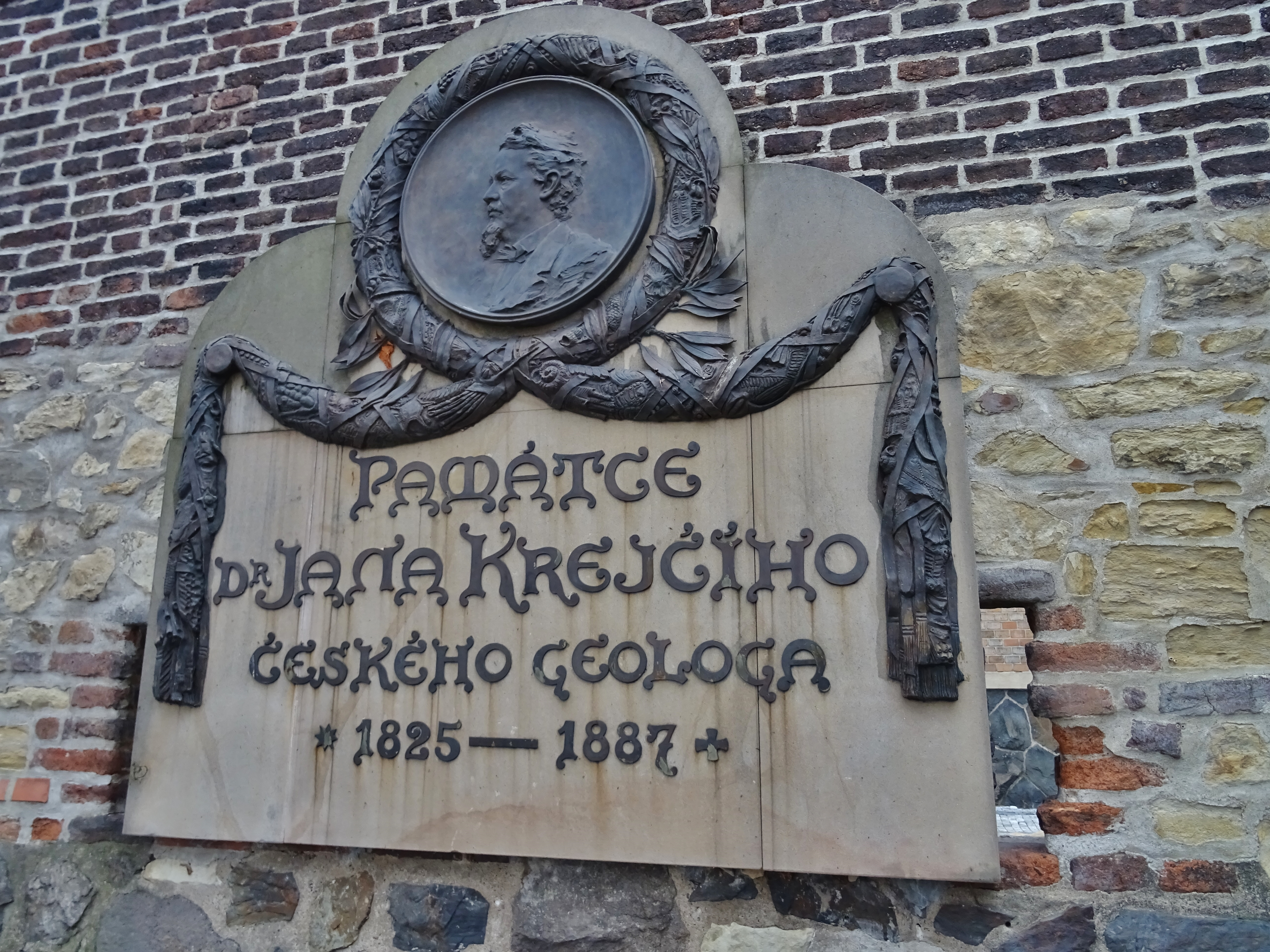
Commemorative plaque at Vyšehrad

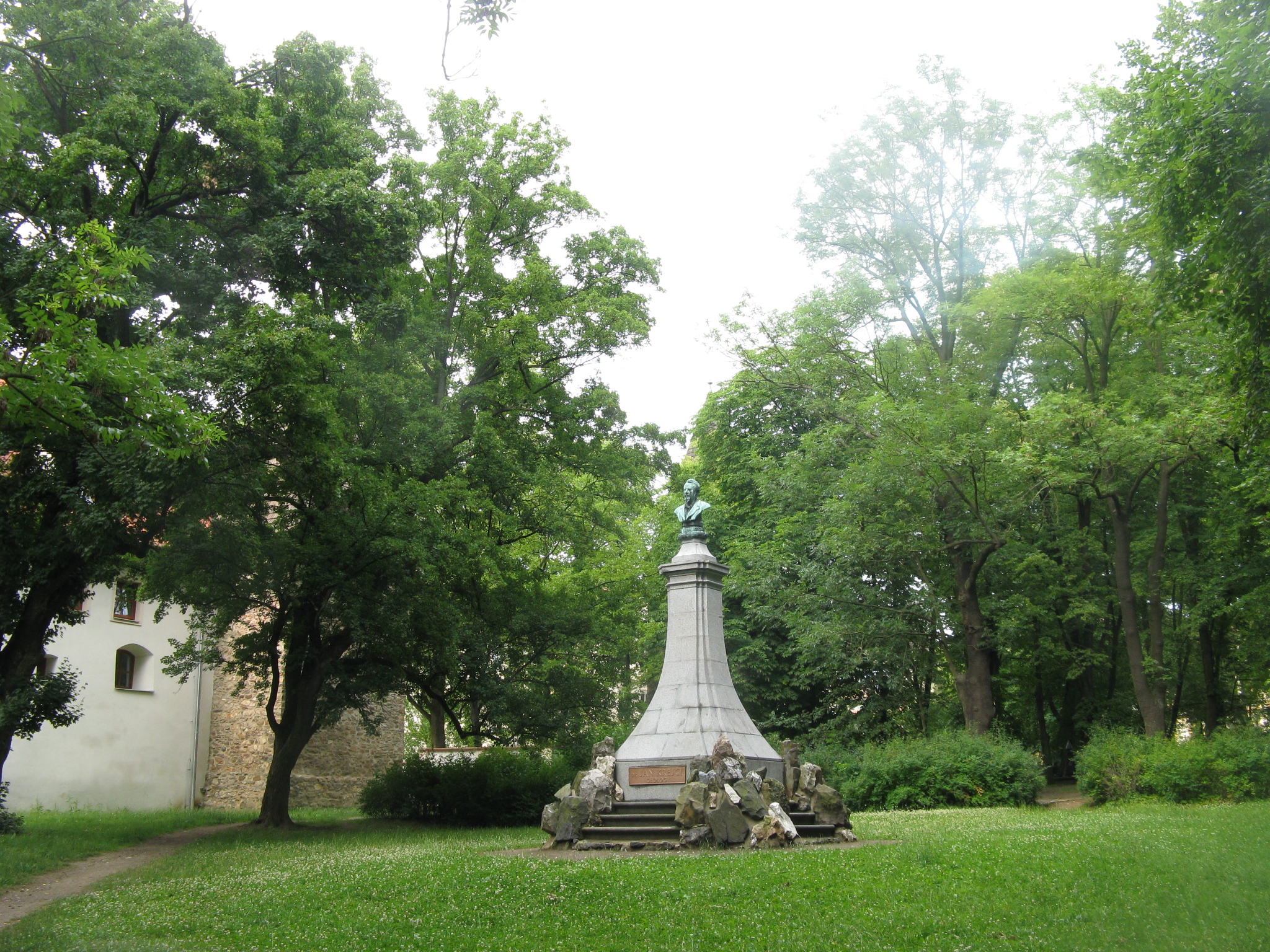
Jan Krejčí Monument in Jaroslava Vrchlického Park in Klatovy

Krejčí was born on 28 February 1825 in Klatovy to a family of a retired dragoon and a laundress. As a four-year-old he moved with his parents to Prague, to the surroundings of Karlín's Invalidovna. He went to the German general school and raised his relationship to Czech from Josef Jungmann, who was his teacher at that time. Then he joined the Academic Gymnasium and after graduating from his studies he went to study at the Polytechnic Institute of Mineralogy and Chemistry in Prague from 1844 to 1848.

Right after the studying in 1848 he taught at the first real school. And in 1849 he was appointed as administrator of mineralogical collections of the Czech Museum in Prague. A year later, he was a substitute for a university professor for mineralogy and geology at the Prague Polytechnic Institute. After 1847 he wrote articles in magazines, where he mapped the geological and natural conditions around Prague during 10 years. He excelled not only in scientific activity, but also as a popularizing scientist especially in student and apprentice youth circles. Since 1850 he has also published many textbooks of geology and mineralogy and mineralogical handbooks. Between 1854 and 1859 he published the textbooks of natural sciences and physics for secondary schools, crystallography and the university textbook of geology – in 1860 the first piece in this field in Bohemia. At first he published his works in Czech, so he is rightly considered to be the "Father of Czech geology" and the foremost Czech natural scientist of the 19th century.

At that time, from 1860 to 1862, he was a professor at the Realschule in Písek and later in Prague. He was not just a didactic and a scientist. He was also attracted by the literature, participated in the collection Perly české and in 1859 – 1860 he contributed to the almanac Máj, edited by Vítězslav Hálek. He also participated in the geological mapping of Bohemia in 1859 – 1861 and already since 1853 he has published, together with J. E. Purkyně, the journal Živa. In 1862, the unique work Cesta po Německu, Švýcarsku, Francii, Anglii a Belgii was created, full of humorous observations, observation of people, social conditions and monitoring of apprenticeship, educational institutions for the poor and abandoned youth. In the same year, he founded the Committee for Natural Science Research of Bohemia at the National Museum.

The publications Všeobecné a horopisné poměry, jakož i rozčlenění křídového útvaru v Čechách (1870) are of great importance. He also wrote a comprehensive textbook on geology (1853), a description of Czech coal seams (1853), characteristics of the nature of ores and metals (1869) and others. He was also active as a politician. His career began in Písek, when he became a member of the city council in 1861, and in the same year he was appointed as a member of the Czech Parliament in the district of Prachatice – Netolice. In August 1868, he was among the 81 signatories, members of the Czech constitutional law. In 1873 he signed the Mlada Bohemian testimony to the voters, followed by a bust up with František Ladislav Rieger. He returned to politics in the early 1980s. In 1881 he was reelected to the Czech Landtag.

On 24 February 1881 he became a member of the Imperial Council. He gave more than 100 speeches in this council, in which he also fought for the rights of the Czech. However, in 1883, due to his progressive illness, he resigned from his mandate, but remained a member of the Czech Parliament. He was also a member of the Council of the Capital City of Prague.

He was seriously ill for the last months of his life and died of cold on 1 August 1887 in his villa on the north side of Vyšehrad Rock, buried in a family tomb at the Vyšehrad Cemetery. On this occasion, poet Adolf Heyduk composed the poem Za Janem Krejčím.

== Gallery ==
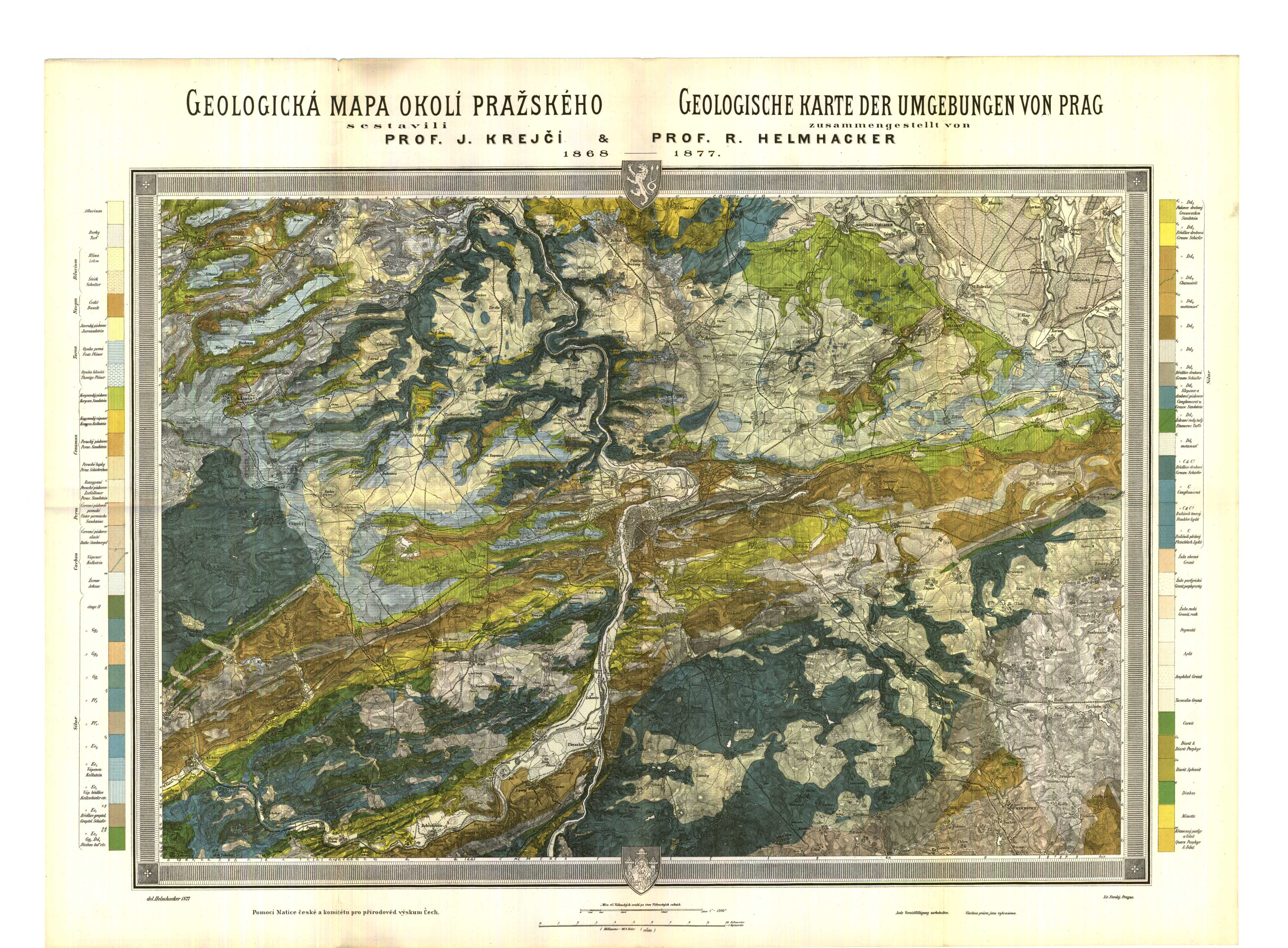
Geological map Prague Bohemia 1877

Magazine Živa

== After death ==
His house was demolished during the construction of a tunnel, the memorial plaque was installed before the World War I on the wall. Unfortunately, in the early 1990s, the plaque was taken down and the wall was demolished. The area was used as a parking lot. The new owner is committed to restoring the plaque, but the time has passed and traffic conditions have worsened. With the support and with the approval of the State Institute of Monument Care, a memorial plaque was placed on the outer wall of the castle at the entrance to Vyšehrad.
