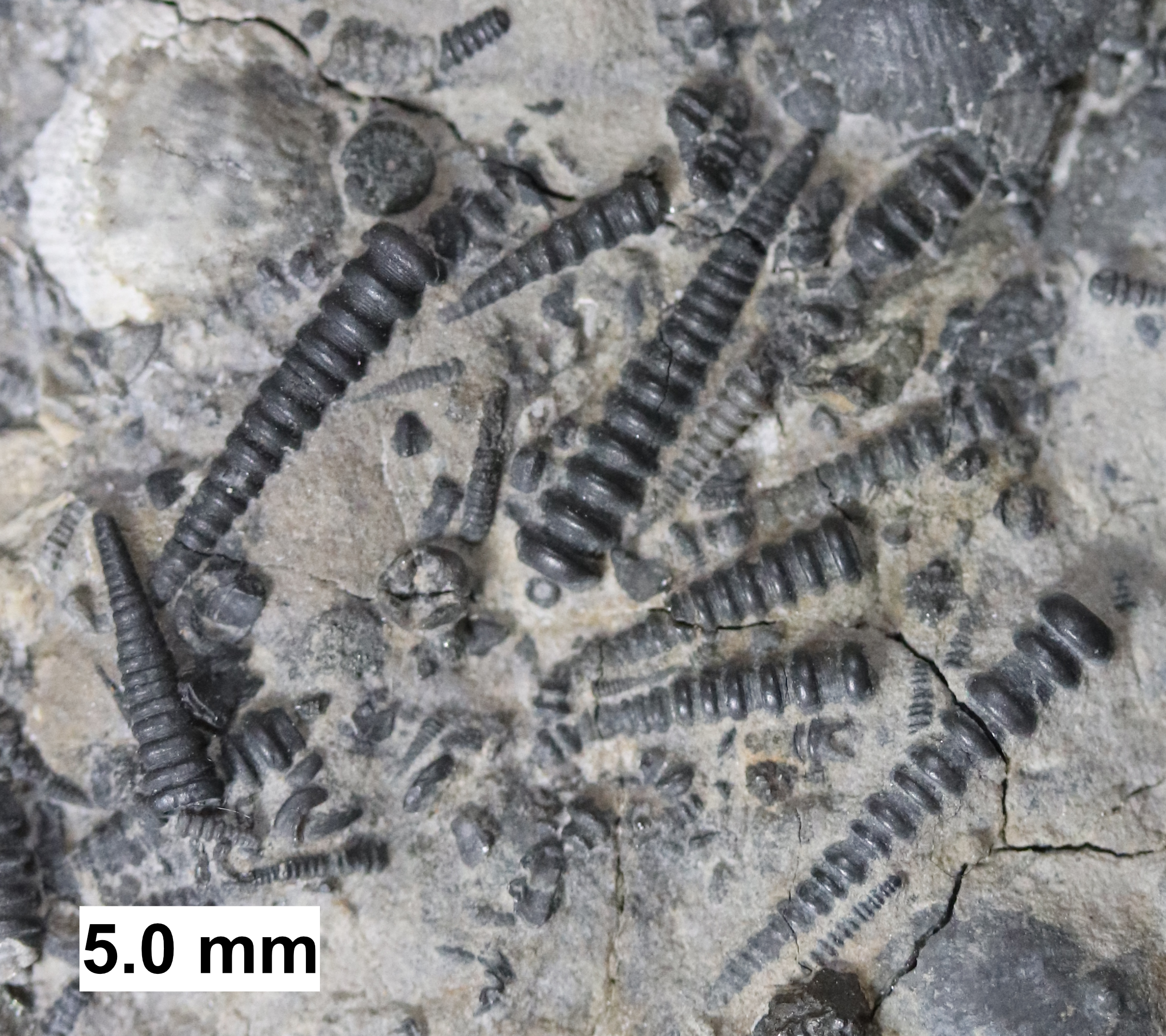
- Tentaculites bellulus from the Middle Devonian of Wisconsin

Scientific classification
- Kingdom: Animalia
- Class: †Tentaculita
- Order: †Tentaculitida
- Family: †Tentaculitidae
- Genus: †Tentaculites von Schlotheim, 1820

Species
- T. altenaensis Roemer, 1850; T. anglicus Schlotheim, 1820; T. annularus Schlotheim, 1820; T. bellulus Hall, 1876; T. crotalinus Salter, 1856; T. exaltatus Talent, 1963; T. gracillimus Sandberger & Sandberger, 1854; T. grandis Roemer, 1870; T. hisingeri Larsson, 1979; T. lebiensis Zagora, 1972; T. mucronatus Maurer, 1885; T. ornatus Sowerby, 1839; T. oswegoensis F.B. Meek & A.H. Worthen, 1865; T. polonicus Gürich, 1839; T. scalaris Schlotheim, 1820; T. Schlotheimi Koken, 1889

= Tentaculites =

Tentaculites Temporal range: Early Ordovician – Late Devonian

Extinct genus of invertebrates

Tentaculites is an extinct genus of conical fossils of uncertain affinity, class Tentaculita, although it is not the only member of the class. It is known from Lower Ordovician to Upper Devonian deposits both as calcitic shells with a brachiopod-like microstructure and carbonaceous 'linings'.

== Affinity ==
The taxonomic classification of tentaculitids is uncertain. Some grouped them with pteropods, but there is no modern support and only superficial similarity. They may also be related to other conical shells of uncertain affinity including cornulitids, Anticalyptraea, microconchids and trypanoporids. Their shell microstructure has warranted their comparison with the brachiopods and phoronids, and the possible Ediacaran lophophorate Namacalathus. Musculature also points to a lophophorate affinity, with similarities found to bryozoan and brachiopod musculature and tentacles.

== Morphology ==
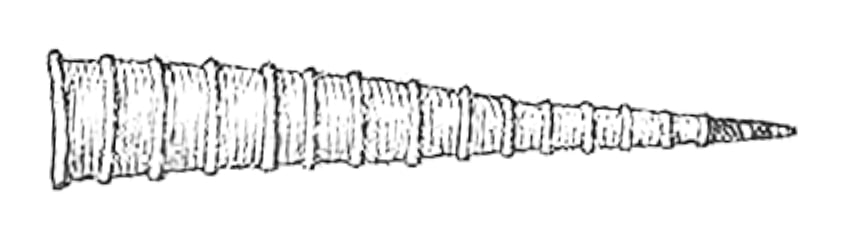
Sketch of a Tentaculites ornatus, Silurian.

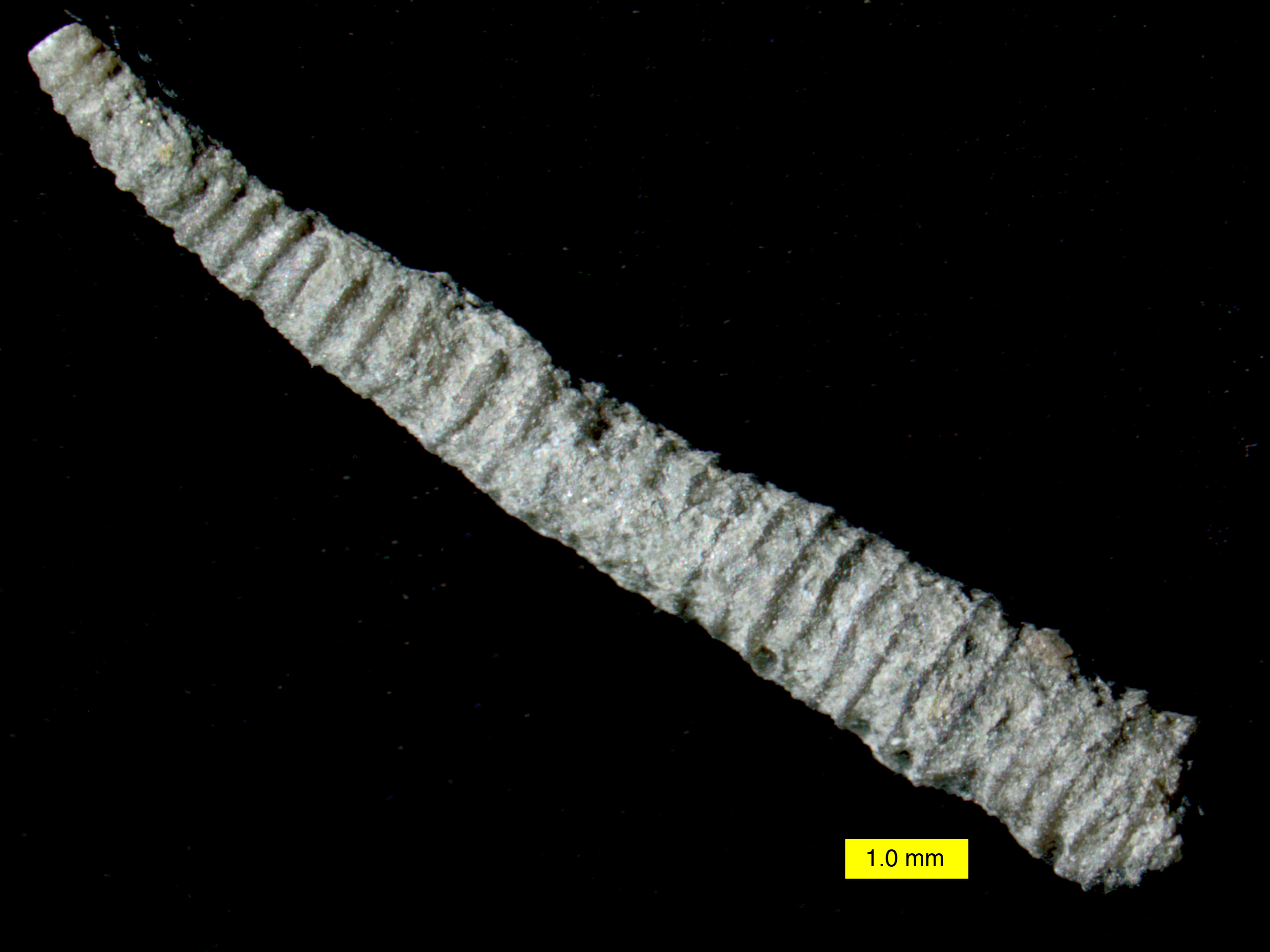
Tentaculitid from the New Creek Limestone (Lochkovian, Early Devonian) of New Creek, West Virginia.

Tentaculitids have ribbed, cone-shaped shells which range in length from 5 to 20 mm. Some species septate; their embryonic shell, which is retained, forms a small, sometimes spherical, chamber.

== Ecology ==
Some species are inferred to have been planktonic.

== See also ==
- Mari Mari Group, fossil formation in the state of Amazonas of northwestern Brazil
