= Douvillinella =

Douvillinella Temporal range: 409.1–382.7 Ma

Scientific classification
- Kingdom: Animalia
- Phylum: Brachiopoda
- Class: †Strophomenata
- Order: †Strophomenida
- Family: †Douvillinidae
- Subfamily: †Protodouvillininae
- Genus: †Douvillinella; Spriestersbach, 1925

Subgenera and species
- Subgenera: †Douvillinella (Crinistrophia); †Douvillinella (Douvilinella); Species: † Douvillinella (Crinistrophia) elegans (syn †Crinistrophia elegans Drevermann, 1902); †Douvillinella filifer; †Douvillinella variabilis (Calvin)

Synonyms
- Crinistrophia Havlíček, 1967

Extinct genus of brachiopods

Douvillinella is an extinct genus of prehistoric brachiopods in the extinct family Douvillinidae. Species are from the Devonian of the Czech Republic and Germany. C. elegans (also spelled Crinostrophia elegans) is found only at Arauz Formation, Lezna Member, Palencia Province, North Spain (Devonian of Spain).

== See also ==
- List of brachiopod genera
