= Arauz Formation =

Geologic formation in Spain

- Stratigraphic range: Emsian; ~407–392 Ma
- Type: Geological formation
- Unit of: Abadia Group
- Sub-units: Lezna & Requejada Members

Lithology
- Primary: Marl
- Other: Shale, limestone

Location
- Coordinates: 43.0°N 0.9°W
- Approximate paleocoordinates: 43.0°S 35.4°E
- Region: Palencia
- Country: Spain

Type section
- Named for: Arauz River
- Arauz Formation (Spain)

The Arauz Formation is an Emsian fossiliferous stratigraphic unit in Spain. It is a member of the Abadia Group. It is situated in the Province of Palencia, North Spain. It is in the north of Natural Park of Fuentes Carrionas and Fuente Cobre-Montaña Palentina where the Rio Arauz lies. It is from the Devonian of Spain.

== Fossil content ==
The following fossils have been reported from the formation:

- Trilobites
  - Kayserops obsoletus
  - Metacanthina cf. asnoensis
  - Leonaspis sp.
  - Metacanthina sp.
  - Odontochile sp.
  - Otarion (Maurotarion) sp.
  - Xiphogonium sp.
  - Phacopida indet.
- Cephalopods
  - Erbenoceras advolvens
  - Fidelites ruppachensis
  - Gyroceratites gracilis
  - G. aff. laevis
  - Latanarcestes (Latanarcestes) noeggerathi
  - Mimagoniatites bohemicus
  - Mimosphinctes sp.
- Corals
  - Cleistodictyum porosum
  - Pleurodictyum microspinosum
  - Procterodictyum polentinoi
  - Combophyllum sp.
  - Rugosa indet.
- Conodonts
  - Icriodus bilatericrescens
  - I. corniger
  - I. culicellus
  - I. fusiformis
  - I. sigmoidalis
  - Ozarkodina steinhornensis
  - Polygnathus dehiscens
  - P. gronbergi
  - P. perbonus
  - Icriodus sp.
- Tentaculita
  - Nowakia barrandei
  - N. cancellata
  - N. elegans
  - N. richteri
- Rhynchonellata
  - Arduspirifer arduennensis
  - Bifida lepida
  - Euryspirifer paradoxus
  - Holynatrypa mirabilis
  - Mauispirifer scutiformis
  - Prokopia bouskai
  - Schizophoria vulvaria
- Strophomenata
  - Bojodouvillina (Bojodouvillina) morzakeci
  - Crinostrophia aff. elegans
  - Eodevonaria cf. jahnkei
  - Plectodonta (Dalejodiscus) minor
  - Strophochonetes sp.

== See also ==
- List of fossiliferous stratigraphic units in Spain
