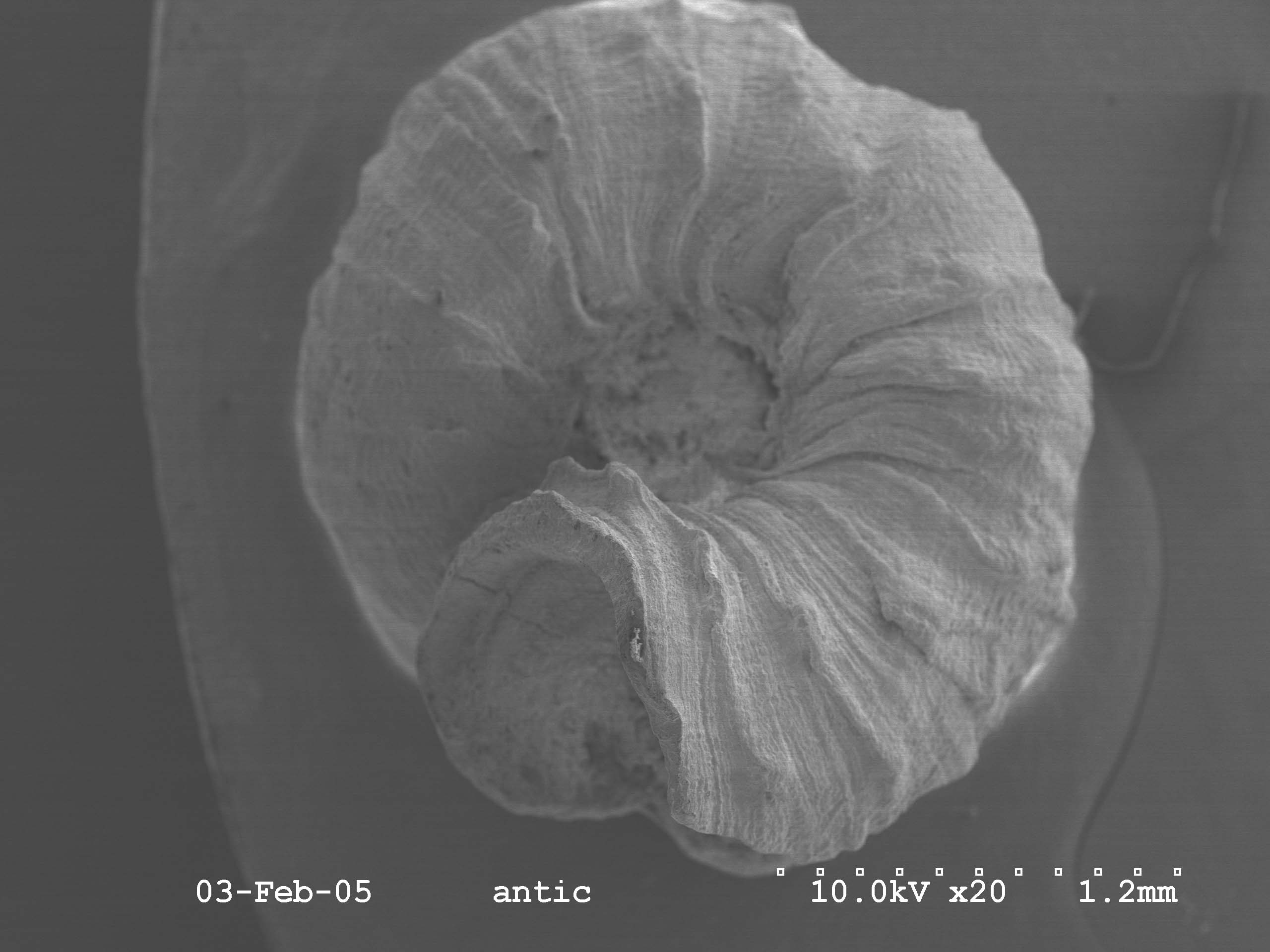
- Annuliconchus siluricus (Eichwald, 1860) from Eke Formation, Ludlow, Lau, Gotland.

Scientific classification
- Kingdom: Animalia
- Class: †Tentaculita
- Order: †Microconchida
- Family: †Palaeoconchidae
- Genus: †Annuliconchus; Vinn, 2006

= Annuliconchus =

Annuliconchus Temporal range: Silurian

Extinct genus of microconchids

Annuliconchus is a genus of microconchid tubeworms. Their tubes have pseudopunctae penetrating the tube wall. Tubes lumen is annulated. Annuliconchus occurs in the Silurian of Baltica.
