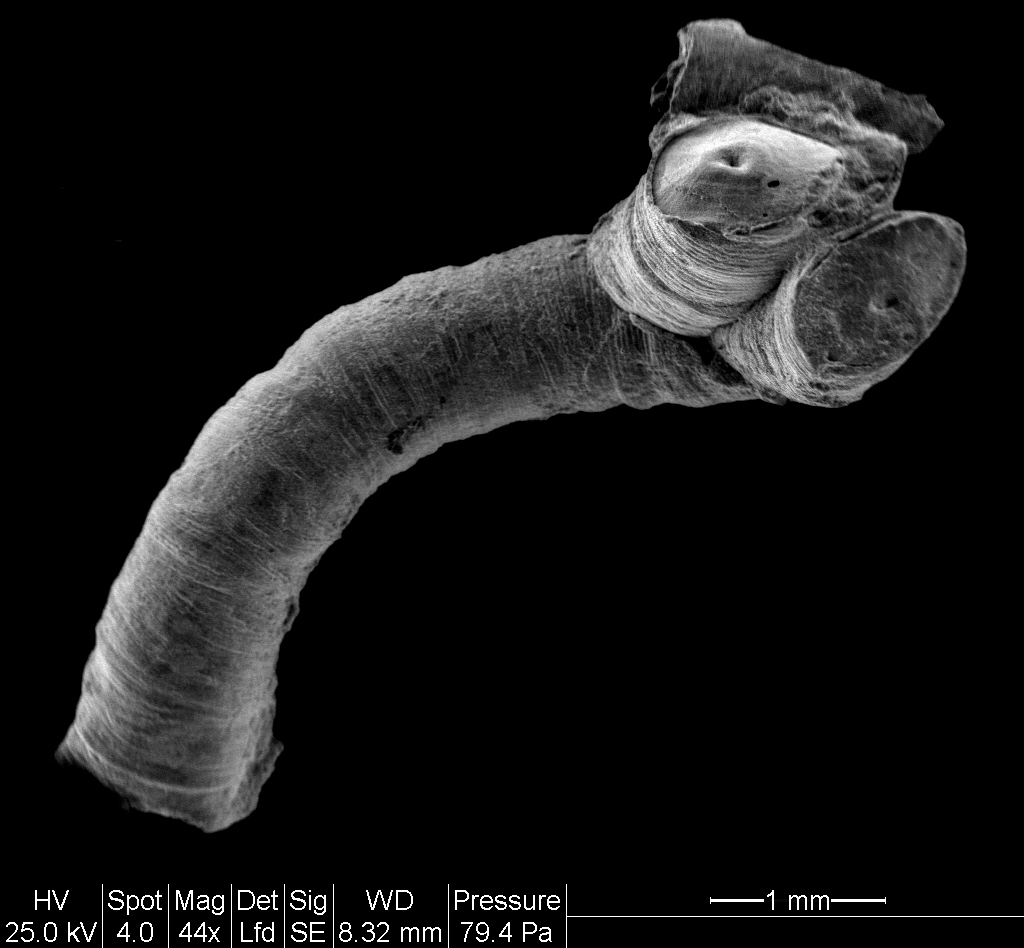
- Helicoconchus elongatus Wilson et al., 2011 from Lower Permian of Texas.

Scientific classification
- Kingdom: Animalia
- Class: †Tentaculita
- Order: †Microconchida
- Family: †Helicoconchidae; Zatoń in Zatoń and Olempska, 2017
- Genus: †Helicoconchus; Wilson, Vinn and Yancey, 2011

= Helicoconchus =

Helicoconchus Temporal range: Early Permian

Extinct genus of microconchids

Helicoconchus is a microconchid genus that occurs in the Lower Permian of Texas. It forms small reef-like bodies of tubes branching from a common origin. The impunctate tubes are greatly elongated for microconchids and have occasional diaphragms with central pits. The tubes branch in two ways: budding from the tube wall and binary fission. They lived in shallow, normal marine environments.

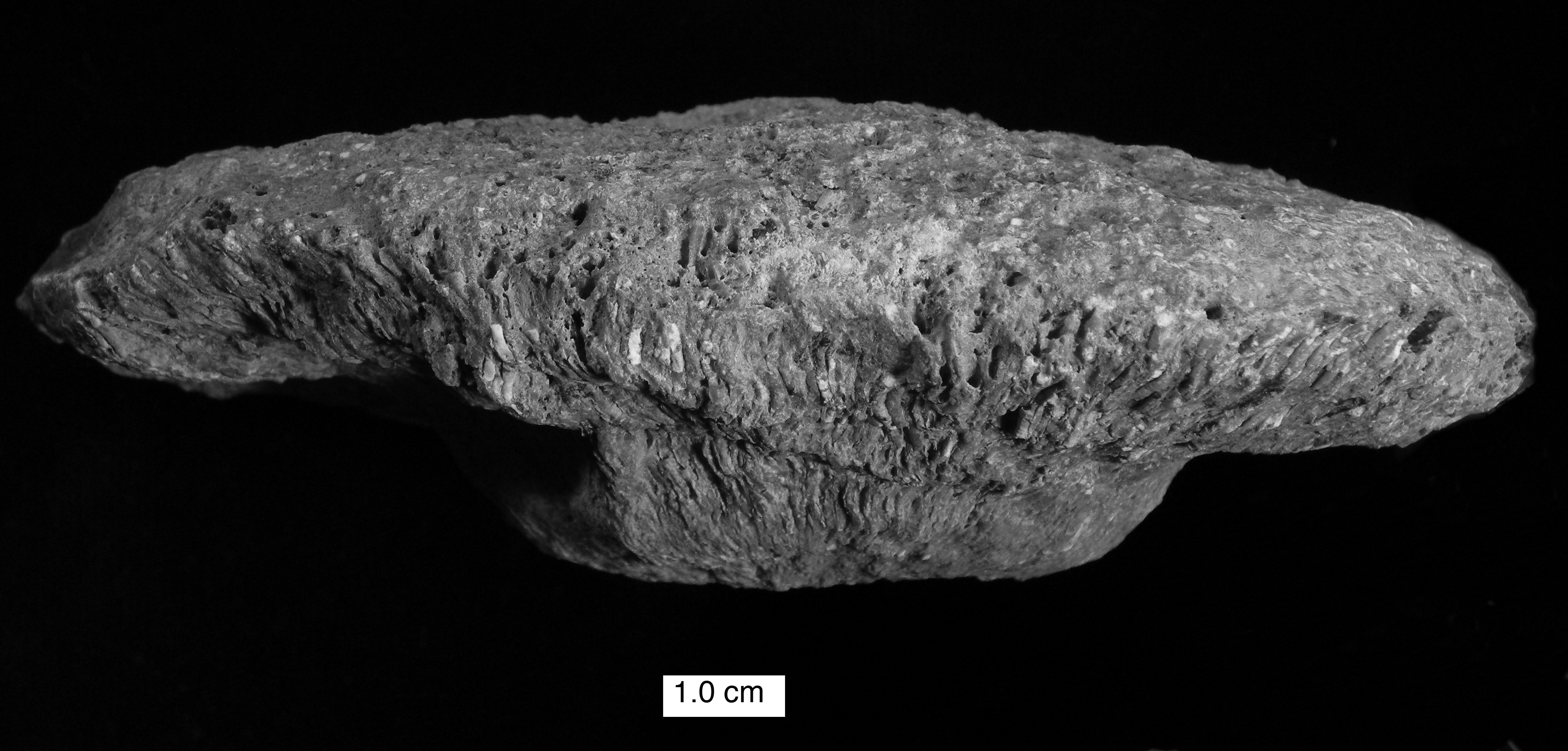
Helicoconchus elongatus; view of branching aggregation of tubes.
