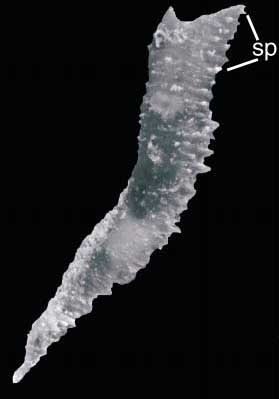
- Conchicolites sp. overview of the rings with spines, Lilla Karlsö, Sweden, Wenlock–Ludlow, sp–spines.

Scientific classification
- Kingdom: Animalia
- Class: †Tentaculita
- Order: †Cornulitida
- Family: †Cornulitidae
- Genus: †Conchicolites; Nicholson, 1872

= Conchicolites =

Conchicolites Temporal range: Late Ordovician–Devonian

Fossil genus of tubeworms

Conchicolites is a fossil genus of cornulitid tubeworms. Their shells lack vesicular wall structure and have a smooth lumen. They are externally covered with transverse ridges. Some species have spines. They usually occur as encrusters on various shelly fossils. Their fossils are known from the Late Ordovician to the Devonian.
