= Christianiidae =

Christianiidae Temporal range: 460.9–439.0 Ma

Scientific classification
- Domain: Eukaryota
- Kingdom: Animalia
- Phylum: Brachiopoda
- Class: †Strophomenata
- Order: †Strophomenida
- Superfamily: †Strophomenoidea
- Family: †Christianiidae; Williams, 1953

Genera
- †Christiania; †Nubialba

Extinct family of brachiopods

Christianiidae is an extinct family of prehistoric brachiopods in the superfamily Strophomenoidea.
