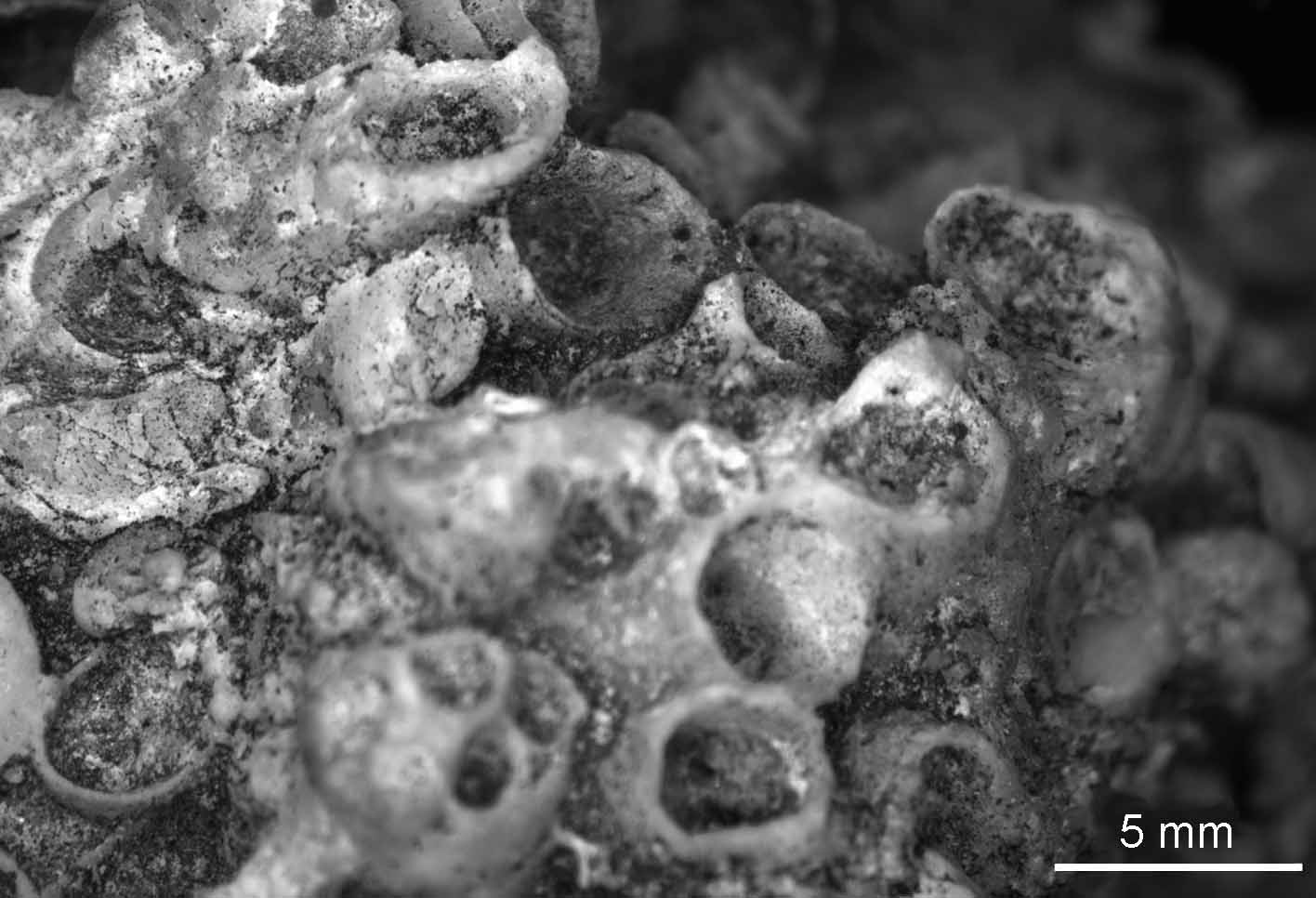
- Septalites septatus from the Silurian of Gotland

Scientific classification
- Kingdom: Animalia
- Class: †Tentaculita
- Order: †Cornulitida
- Family: †Cornulitidae
- Genus: †Septalites; Vinn, 2005

= Septalites =

Septalites Temporal range: Silurian

Genus of ctenophores

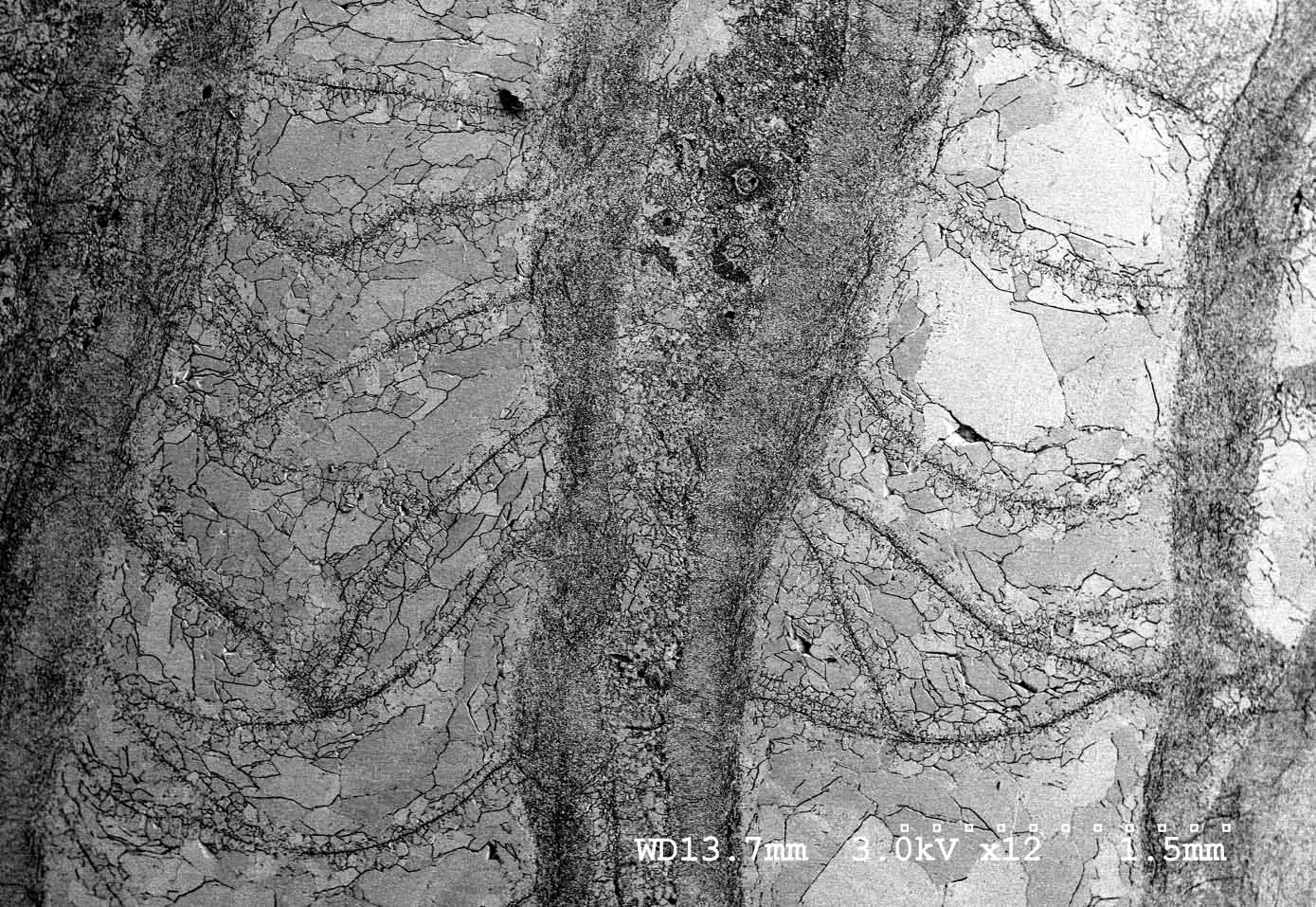
Septalites septatus longitudinal section of the tube showing septa. Silurian of Gotland

Septalites is a genus of cornulitid tubeworms. Their shells lack vesicular wall structure and have a smooth lumen filled with numerous transverse septa. They are externally covered with transverse ridges. Their fossils are known only from the Silurian of Gotland.
