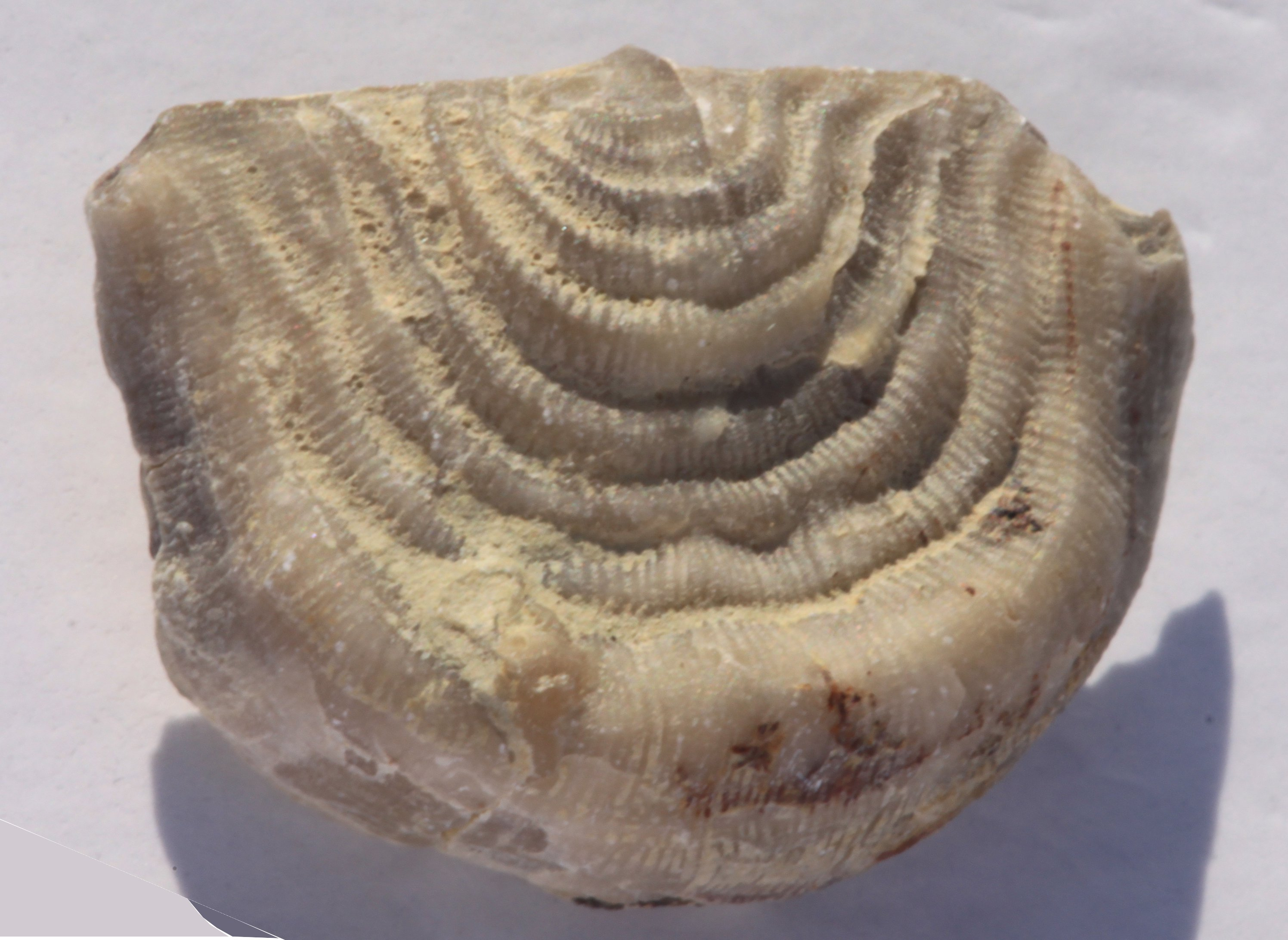
- Leptaena rhomboidalis

Scientific classification
- Kingdom: Animalia
- Phylum: Brachiopoda
- Class: †Strophomenata
- Order: †Strophomenida
- Family: †Rafinesquinidae
- Subfamily: †Leptaeninae
- Genus: †Leptaena; Dalman, 1828

Type species
- Leptaena rugosa Dalman, 1828

Species
- See Species

Synonyms
- Kurnamena Roomusoks, 1989; Leptaenopoma Marek and Havlíček, 1967; Orhoria Havlicek and Storch, 1990; Similoleptaena Roomusoks, 1989; Turgenostrophia

= Leptaena =

Leptaena Temporal range: Darriwilian–Emsian

Genus of paleozoic brachiopods

Leptaena is an extinct genus of mid-sized brachiopod that existed from the Dariwilian epoch to the Emsian epoch, though some specimens have been found in strata as late in age as the Tournasian epoch. Like some other Strophomenids, Lepteana were epifaunal, meaning they lived on top of the seafloor, not buried within it, and were suspension feeders.

== Physical description ==
Leptaena usually have concentric wrinkling and concentric lines on the shell. Leptaena have a concavo-convex profile, and are sometimes Semiquadrate to semielliptical. The Cardinal Process is split in two and the hinge line is straight. Their width is usually greater than their length, like most Strophomenids.

== Distribution ==
Leptaena fossils have been found on every continent except Antarctica.

== Species ==
Leptaena was a diverse genus, with over 70 recognized species and subgenera. Species in the genus Leptaena include the following. Any synonymous genera to which a given species may belong to are labelled with the synonymous genus in parentheses.

- L. acuta (Kurnamena) (Roomusoks, 2004)
- L. acuticuspidata Amsden, 1958
- L. aequalis Amsden, 1974
- L. alliku (Oraspold, 1956)
- L. altera Rybnikova, 1966
- L. amelia (Havlicek, 1967)
- L. analogaeformis Biernat, 1966
- L. arberae Kelly, 1967
- L. argentina (Thomas, 1905)
- L. bergstroemi Cocks, 2005
- L. borghiana Mergl & Massa, 1992
- L. boyaca Caster, 1939
- L. contermina Cocks, 1968
- L. convexa Weller, 1914
- L. cooperi Easton et al., 1958
- L. crassorugata (Similoleptaena) (Rõõmusoks, 2004)
- L. croma (Havlicek & Storch, 1990)
- L.crypta Opik, 1930
- L. cryptoides (Oraspold, 1956)
- L. dejecta (Baarli, 1995)
- L. delicata Amsden, 1949
- L. depressa (Sowerby, 1825)
- L. diademata (Williams, 1962)
- L. electra (Havlicek, 1967)
- L. ennessbe Spjeldnaes, 1957
- L. enucleata Klenina, 1984
- L. eska Gallager & Harper, 2024
- L. friedrichi (Similoleptaena) (Rõõmusoks, 2004)
- L. gibbosa (James, 1874)
- L. haverfordensis Bancroft, 1949
- L. holcrofti Bassett, 1974
- L. indigena Spjeldnaes, 1957
- L. infrunita (Williams, 1962)
- L. ingrica (Similoleptaena) (Rõõmusoks, 2004)
- L. juvenilis (Öpik, 1930)
- L. kentuckiana Pope, 1982
- L. lappa (Havlicek & Storch, 1990)
- L. lappina (Havlicek & Storch, 1990)
- L. laterorugata (Kurnamena) (Roomusoks, 1989)
- L. lemniscata (Havlicek, 1967)
- L. limbifera (Havlicek, 1967)
- L. martinensis Cocks, 1968
- L. moniquensis Foerste, 1924
- L. nanaformis Zhang et al., 1983
- L. nassichuki Smith, 1980
- L. odeon Havlicek, 1967
- L. oklahomensis Amsden, 1951
- L. ordovicica (Cooper, 1956)
- L. orhor (Havlicek & Storch, 1990)
- L. palmrei (Kurnamena) (Roomusoks, 2004)
- L. parvirugata Hoel, 2005
- L. parvissima Ivanovskii & Kulkov, 1974
- L. paucirugata (Roomusoks 1989)
- L. pertenuis (Similoleptaena) (Rõõmusoks, 2004)
- L. planitia (Similoleptaena) (Rõõmusoks, 2004)
- L. poulseni Kelly, 1967
- L. praequalis Rozman, 1977
- L. provellerosa (Havlicek & Storch, 1990)
- L. purpurea Cocks, 1968
- L. quadrata Bancroft, 1949
- L. quadrilatera (Logan, 1863)
- L. rara (Alekseeva and Erlanger, 1983)
- L. reedi Cocks, 1968
- L. rhomboidalis (Wahlanberg, 1818)
- L. richmondensis Foerste, 1909
- L. roomusoki Cocks, 2005
- L. rugata (Lindström, 1861)
- L. rugaurita (Havlicek, 1967)
- L. rugosa (Dalman, 1828)
- L. rugosides Oraspold, 1956
- L. salopiensis (Williams, 1963)
- L. semiradiata Sowerby, 1842
- L. senecta Roomusoks, 2004
- L. sperion Bassett, 1977
- L. spumiferra (Kurnamea) (Opik, 1930)
- L. strandi (Spjeldnaes, 1957)
- L. tarwanpensis (Similoleptaena) (Rõõmusoks, 2004)
- L. taxilla (Kurnamena) (Oraspold, 1965)
- L. tenuissimestriata McCoy, 1852
- L. tenuistrata Sowerby, 1839
- L. tenuistriata (de Sowerby and Murchison, 1839)
- L. trifidium (Leptaenopoma) (Marek and Havlíček, 1967)
- L. trifidum (Marek and Havlíček, 1967)
- L. undosa (Similoleptaena) (Rõõmusoks, 2004)
- L. valentia (Cocks, 1968)
- L. valida Bancroft, 1949
- L. veldrensis Spjeldnaes, 1957
- L. vellerosa Havlicek, 1967
- L. ventricosa Williams, 1963
- L. zeta Lamont, 1947
- L. ziegleri Cocks, 1968
