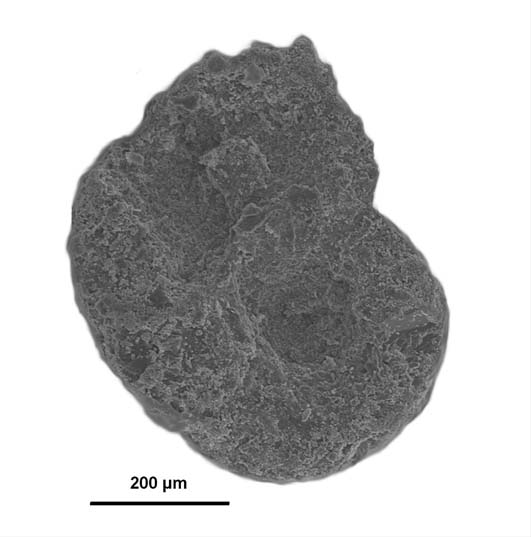
- Palaeoconchus minor Vinn, 2006 from Late Ordovician of Kõrgessaare, Hiiumaa, Estonia.

Scientific classification
- Kingdom: Animalia
- Class: †Tentaculita
- Order: †Microconchida
- Family: †Palaeoconchidae
- Genus: †Palaeoconchus; Vinn, 2006

= Palaeoconchus =

Palaeoconchus Temporal range: Late Ordovician–Devonian

Extinct genus of microconchids

Palaeoconchus is a genus of microconchid tubeworms. Their tubes have pseudopunctae penetrating the tube wall. Tubes lumen is smooth. Palaeoconchus occurs in the Late Ordovician of Baltica and Avalonia. In the Devonian it had a global distribution.
