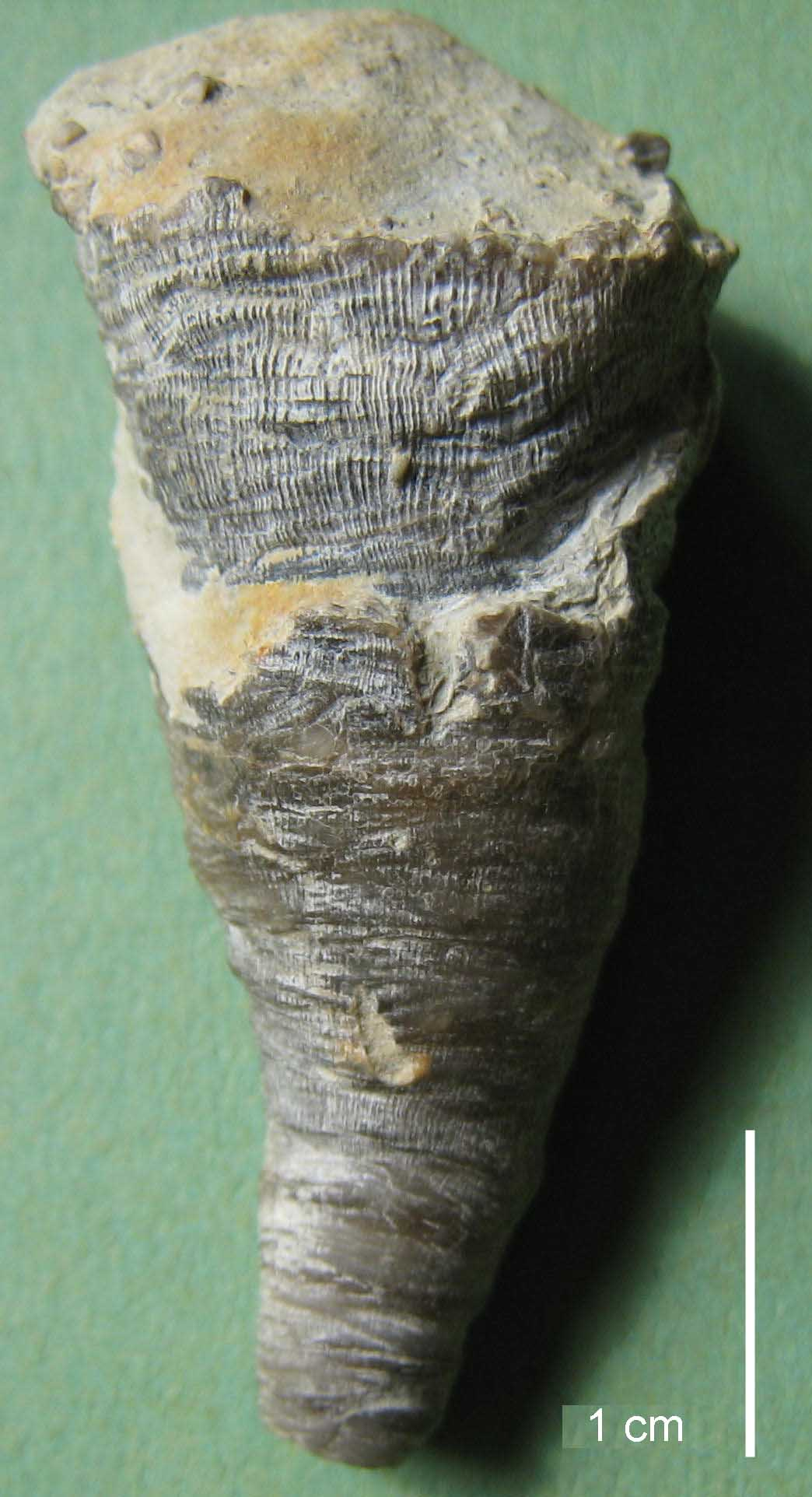
- Cornulites cellulosus from Wenlock of Saaremaa, Estonia.

Scientific classification
- Kingdom: Animalia
- Class: †Tentaculita
- Order: †Cornulitida
- Family: †Cornulitidae
- Genus: †Cornulites; Schlotheim, 1820

= Cornulites =

Cornulites Temporal range: Mid Ordovician–Carboniferous

Genus of cornulitid tubeworms

Cornulites is a genus of cornulitid tubeworms. Their shells have vesicular wall structure, and are both externally and internally annulated. They usually occur as encrusters on various shelly fossils. Their fossils are known from the Middle Ordovician to the Carboniferous.

== Species ==
- Cornulites cancellatus
- Cornulites cellulosus
- Cornulites concavus
- Cornulites gremialis
- Cornulites levigatus
- Cornulites mainensis
- Cornulites rosehillensis
- Cornulites scalariformis
- Cornulites semiapertus
- Cornulites serpularius (type)
- Cornulites stromatoporoides
- Cornulites subdistans
- Cornulites youngi
