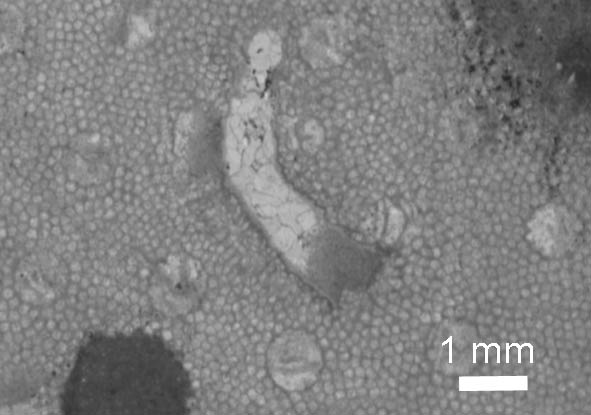
- Coralloconchus bragensis in Heliolites sp., Upper Ludlow, Silurian of Podolia, Ukraine.

Scientific classification
- Kingdom: Animalia
- Class: †Tentaculita
- Order: †Cornulitida
- Family: †Cornulitidae
- Genus: †Coralloconchus; Vinn and Mõtus, 2008

= Coralloconchus =

Coralloconchus Temporal range: Silurian(Vinn and Mõtus, 2008)

Extinct genus of animals

Coralloconchus is a genus of cornulitid tubeworms with small, slender, irregularly curved conical tubes with slowly increasing diameter. Tubes have thin walls and a smooth lumen. Tube wall has a lamellar microstructure. Tubes are devoid of septa and vesicles in the adult part and are not spirally coiled.
