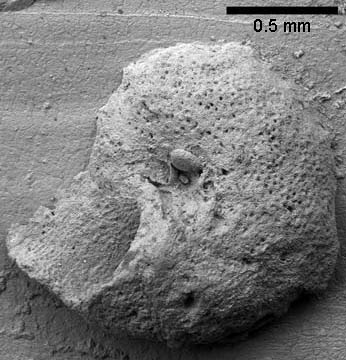
- Punctaconchus ampliporus Vinn and Taylor, 2007 from the Bathonian, White Limestone Formation, Foss Cross Quarry, Gloucestershire, UK.

Scientific classification
- Kingdom: Animalia
- Class: †Tentaculita
- Order: †Microconchida
- Family: †Punctaconchidae; Zatoń in Zatoń and Olempska, 2017
- Genus: †Punctaconchus; Vinn and Taylor, 2007

= Punctaconchus =

Punctaconchus Temporal range: Mid Jurassic

Extinct genus of microconchids

Punctaconchus is a genus of microconchid tubeworms. It was the last genus of microconchids, and the only genus to exist beyond the Triassic. Their tubes have large pores (punctae) penetrating the tube wall. Tubes lumen is covered by ripplemark−like transverse ridges. Punctaconchus occurs in the Middle Jurassic of England, France and Poland.
