= Christiania (brachiopod) =

Christiania Temporal range: 460.9–439.0 Ma

Scientific classification
- Domain: Eukaryota
- Kingdom: Animalia
- Phylum: Brachiopoda
- Class: †Strophomenata
- Order: †Strophomenida
- Family: †Christianiidae
- Genus: †Christiania; Hall and Clarke, 1892

Species
- See text

Synonyms
- †Christianella

Extinct genus of brachiopods

Christiania is an extinct genus of prehistoric brachiopods in the family Christianiidae.

== Species ==
- Christiania aseptata
- Christiania bilobata
- Christiania dalarnensis
- Christiania hastata
- Christiania hollii
- Christiania holtedahli
- Christiania perrugata
- Christiania portlocki
- Christiania proclivis
- Christiania subquadrata
- Christiania sulcata
- Christiania tenuicincta
- Christiania trentonensis
