= Protodouvillininae =

Protodouvillininae Temporal range: 460.9–383.7 Ma

Scientific classification
- Domain: Eukaryota
- Kingdom: Animalia
- Phylum: Brachiopoda
- Class: †Strophomenata
- Order: †Strophomenida
- Family: †Douvillinidae
- Subfamily: †Protodouvillininae; Harper and Boucot, 1978

Genera
- See text

Extinct subfamily of marine lamp shells

Protodouvillininae is an extinct subfamily of prehistoric brachiopods in the extinct family Douvillinidae. The type genus is Protodouvillina.

== Genera ==
- Bojodouvillina
- Contradouvillina
- Cymostrophia
- Douvillinella
- Hercostrophia
- Malurostrophia
- Megastrophiella
- Moravostrophia
- Nadiastrophia
- Paucistrophia
- Phragmostrophia
- Protodouvillina
- Radiomena
- Taemostrophia
- Teichostrophia
- Telaeoshaleria
