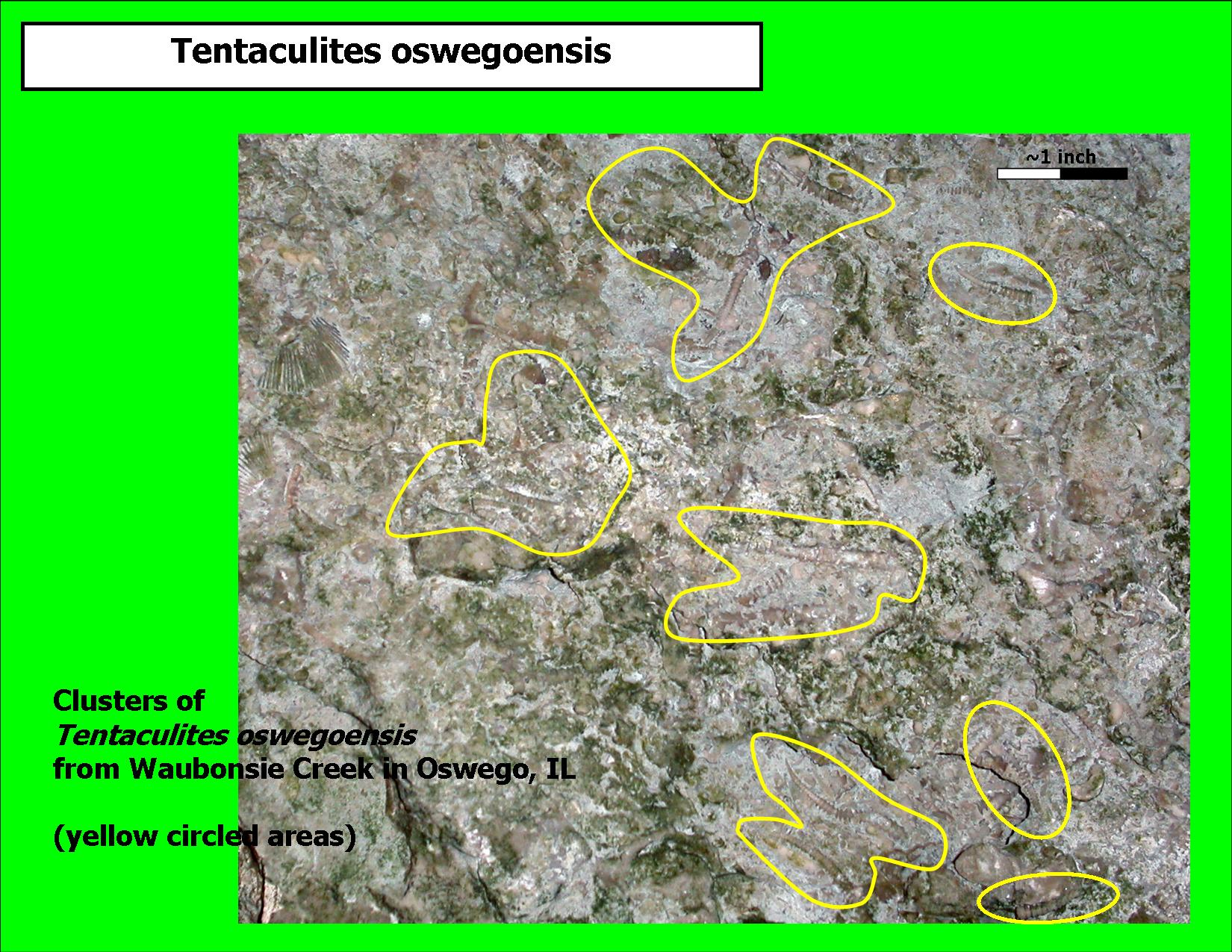
- Sample of a bound grainstone with abundant invertebrate marine fossil debris from Waubonsie Creek, Oswego, Illinois

Scientific classification
- Domain: Eukaryota
- Kingdom: Animalia
- Class: †Tentaculita
- Order: †Tentaculitida
- Family: †Tentaculitidae
- Genus: †Tentaculites
- Species: †T. oswegoensis

Binomial name
- †Tentaculites oswegoensis F.B. Meek & A.H. Worthen, 1865

= Tentaculites oswegoensis =

Extinct species of worm-like animal

Tentaculites oswegoensis is a small animal of unresolved phylogenetic affinities that has often been classified with molluscs or even with marine worms and has recently been interpreted as a lophophorate based on shell microstructure. The genus Tentaculites was named in 1820 by von Schlotheim. Tentaculites oswegoensis was named by 1877 and is known from the Upper Ordovician rocks of the Maquoketa Group. It ranged from Oswego, IL (Kendall County) to possibly Kankakee River State Park (KRSP) in Will County, Illinois. At KRSP it appears in the basal Silurian of the Kankakee Formation but has not been found in the underlying Ordovician rocks.

This particular species is approximately 0.75 to 1.25 inches in length. In Oswego, Illinois it is found mostly in clusters at Waubonsie Creek in the basal Brainard Formation (Upper Ordovician), just west of the railroad tracks. The entirety of Class Tentaculita became extinct at the end of the Devonian, leaving no known extant descendants or related species.
