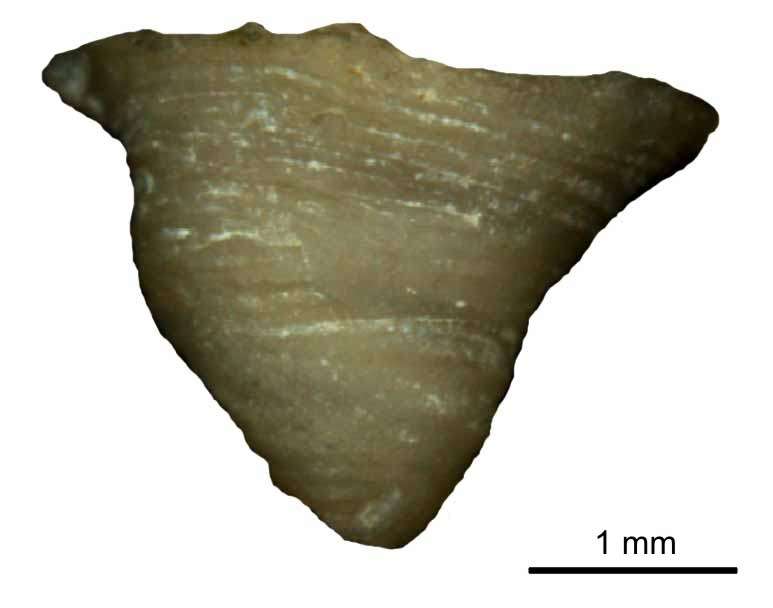
- Anticalyptraea calyptrata from the Kaugatuma Formation (Silurian, Pridoli) in Saaremaa, Estonia.

Scientific classification
- Kingdom: Animalia
- Class: †Tentaculita
- Genus: †Anticalyptraea; Quenstedt, 1867

Species
- Anticalyptraea bastli; Anticalyptraea calyptrata; Anticalyptraea westergaardi

Synonyms
- Autodetus Lindström, 1884

= Anticalyptraea =

Anticalyptraea Temporal range: Silurian–Devonian

Extinct genus of animals

Anticalyptraea is a fossil genus of encrusting tentaculitoid tubeworms from the Silurian to Devonian of Europe and North America (Vinn, 2010). Anticalyptraea commonly encrust various invertebrate fossils such as stromatoporoids, rugose corals, bryozoans, brachiopods and crinoids, but they can also be common on the hardgrounds.

They were often attacked by predators in the Pridoli of Baltica.

Anticalyptraea was traditionally interpreted as a phorid gastropod, but was later assigned to the class Tentaculita. Its dextrally coiled substrate-cemented tube, bulbous initial chamber, vesicular tube wall and pseudopunctate microlamellar shell structure closely resembles trypanoporids (Tentaculita), but Anticalyptraea differs in having the cones of the pseudopunctae oriented in the opposite direction. Pseudopunctae oriented similarly to Anticalyptraea occur in Cornulites (cornulitids) and thick-walled tentaculitids. The name Anticalyptraea is a reference to the gastropod genus Calyptraea.
