= Strophomenoidea =

Strophomenoidea Temporal range: Ordovician–Carboniferous

Scientific classification
- Domain: Eukaryota
- Kingdom: Animalia
- Phylum: Brachiopoda
- Class: †Strophomenata
- Order: †Strophomenida
- Superfamily: †Strophomenoidea; King, 1846

Families
- See text

Superfamily of marine lamp shells

Strophomenoidea is an extinct superfamily of prehistoric brachiopods in the order Strophomenida.

== Families ==
- after Williams, Alwyn; Brunton, C.H.C.; Carlson, S.J.; et al. (1997–2007). Kaesler, Roger L.; Selden, Paul (eds.). Part H, Brachiopoda (Revised). Treatise on Invertebrate Paleontology. Boulder, Colorado; Lawrence, Kansas: Geological Society of America; University of Kansas.

- Amphistrophiidae
- Christianiidae
- Douvillinidae
- Eopholidostrophiidae
- Glyptomenidae
- Leptaenoideidae
- Leptostrophiidae
- Rafinesquinidae
- Shaleriidae
- Strophodontidae
- Strophomenidae
- Strophonellidae
