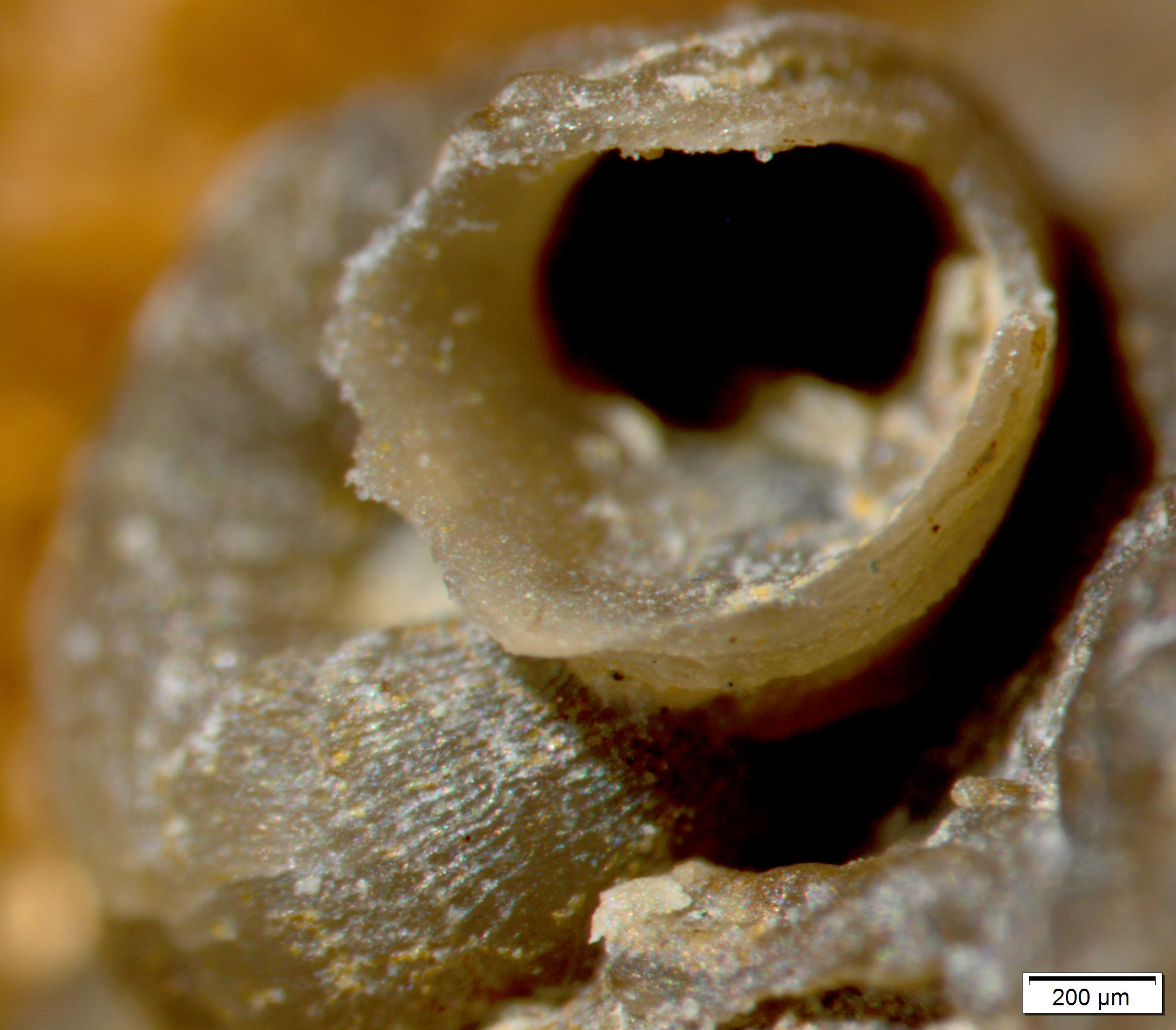
- Palaeoconchus angulatus (Hall, 1861) on a brachiopod from the Middle Devonian (Givetian) of Michigan

Scientific classification
- Kingdom: Animalia
- Class: †Tentaculita
- Order: †Microconchida; Weedon 1991

Families and genera
- Helicoconchidae; Helicoconchus; Microconchidae; Microconchus; Spathioconchus; Palaeoconchidae; Annuliconchus; Palaeoconchus; Polonoconchus; Spinuliconchus; Tuberoconchus; Punctaconchidae; Punctaconchus

= Microconchida =

Microconchida Temporal range: Upper Ordovician - Middle Jurassic (Taylor and Vinn, 2006)

Extinct order of animals

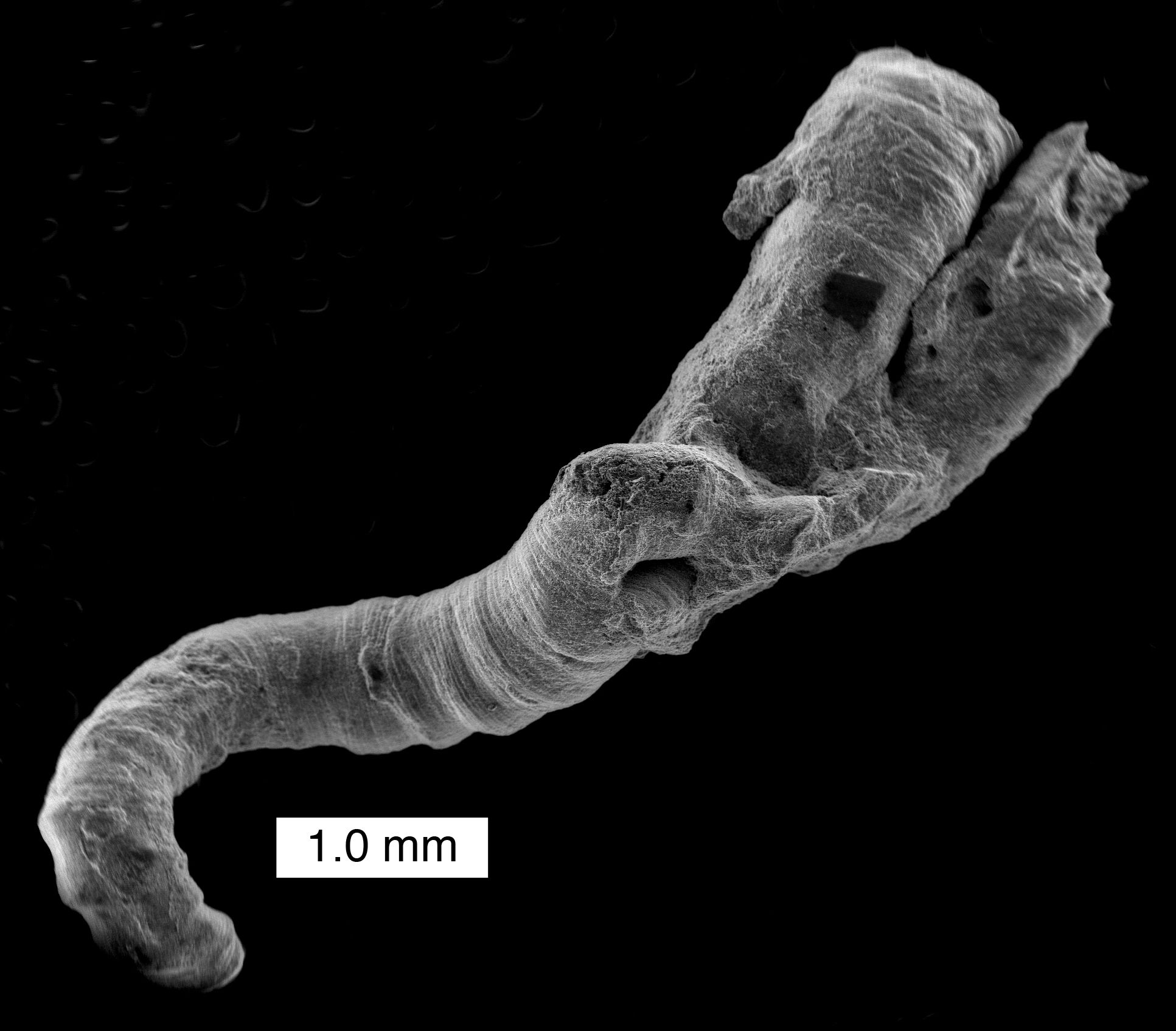
Helicoconchus elongatus, a microconchid from the Lower Permian of Texas. (See Wilson et al., 2011).

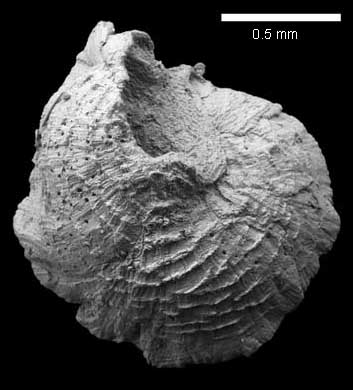
Punctaconchus midfordensis (Richardson, 1907). Bajocian, Clypeus Grit Member, Worgan's Quarry, Gloucestershire, UK.

The order Microconchida is a group of small, spirally-coiled, encrusting fossil "worm" tubes from the class Tentaculita found from the Upper Ordovician to the Middle Jurassic (Bathonian) around the world. They have lamellar calcitic shells, usually with pseudopunctae or punctae and a bulb-like origin. Many were long misidentified as the polychaete annelid Spirorbis until studies of shell microstructure and formation showed significant differences. All pre-Cretaceous "Spirorbis" fossils are now known to be microconchids. Their classification at the phylum level is still debated. Most likely they are some form of lophophorate, a group which includes phoronids, bryozoans and brachiopods. Microconchids may be closely related to the other encrusting tentaculitoid tubeworms, such as Anticalyptraea, trypanoporids and cornulitids. Their habitat is more controversial. While there is a consensus that they were present in the seas and in brackish water, there is a debate about their presence in freshwater. Some studies suggested that they colonised freshwater in the Early Devonian, whereas others suggest that microconchids never colonised that environment. A recent review of the associated fauna failed to find reliable occurrences of microconchids in the Middle Devonian to Early Permian time interval because microconchids seem to co-occur with other signs of marine influence, such as xiphosurans and chondrichthyan egg capsules.
