= Douvillinidae =

Douvillinidae Temporal range: 460.9–370.6 Ma

Scientific classification
- Domain: Eukaryota
- Kingdom: Animalia
- Phylum: Brachiopoda
- Class: †Strophomenata
- Order: †Strophomenida
- Superfamily: †Strophomenoidea
- Family: †Douvillinidae; Caster, 1939

Subfamilies
- †Dicoelostrophiinae; †Douvillininae; †Leptodontellinae; †Protodouvillininae

Extinct family of brachiopods

Douvillinidae is an extinct family of prehistoric brachiopods in the extinct superfamily Strophomenoidea. The type genus is Douvillina.
