= Mari Mari Group =

Geologic group of the Amazon Basin in the state of Amazonas of northwestern Brazil

- Stratigraphic range: Eifelian; ~392–384 Ma
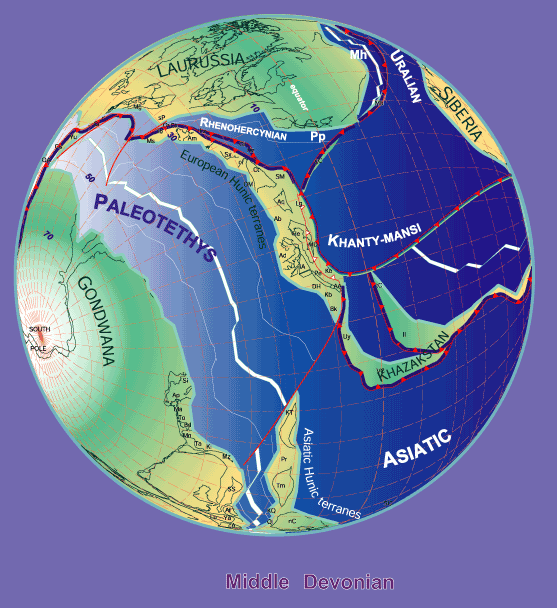
- Late Devonian paleogeography (380 Ma)
- Type: Geological group

Lithology
- Primary: Shale
- Other: Sandstone

Location
- Coordinates: 6.0°S 70.0°W
- Approximate paleocoordinates: 59.9°S 61.5°W
- Region: Amazonas
- Country: Brazil
- Extent: Amazon Basin

Type section
- Named for: Marimari River
- Mari Mari Group (Brazil)

The Mari Mari Group is an Eifelian to Frasnian geologic group of the Amazon Basin in the state of Amazonas of northwestern Brazil. The group comprises shales and sandstones.

== Fossil content ==
The formation has provided fossils of Tentaculites sp., foraminifera and ostracods.
