= Chonioconarida =

Chonioconarida Temporal range: Silurian–Devonian

Scientific classification
- Domain: Eukaryota
- Kingdom: Animalia
- Class: †Tentaculita
- Subclass: †Chonioconarida; Farsan, 1994

Superorders
- Trompetoconarida†; Liriconarida†

Extinct subclass of animals

Chonioconarida is an extinct subclass of free living animals from the Tentaculita class, which were common in the Silurian and Devonian oceans. Chonioconarids have a slim and long needle-like larval parts. They are covered with sculpture throughout (Farsan 2005). Their affinity is unknown. Their fossils are known from Australia, Asia, Europe, Africa, North and South America.
