= Tymbochoos =

Tymbochoos Temporal range: Ordovician

Scientific classification
- Kingdom: Animalia
- Phylum: incertae sedis
- Class: †Tentaculita
- Genus: †Tymbochoos Steele-Petrovich and Bolton, 1998

Tymbochoos is an extinct genus of encrusting tentaculitoid tubeworms. Tymbochoos has a laminar tube structure and pseudopuncta similar to those of the tentaculitoids. It has previously been interpreted as a Palaeozoic polychaete. The world's oldest build-ups with tube-supported frameworks belong to Tymbochoos sinclairi. They occur in the Ordovician limestones of the Ottawa Valley.
