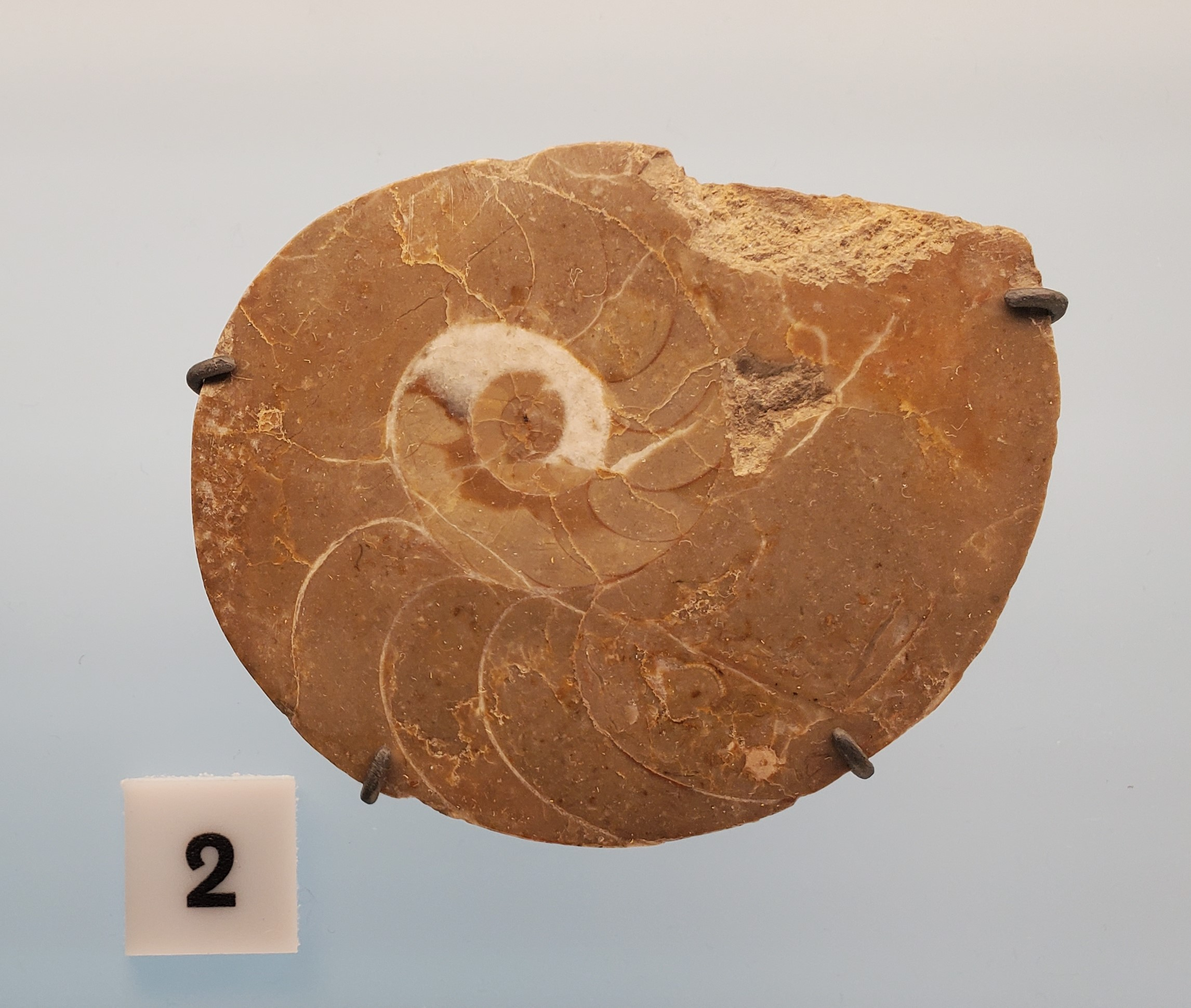
- Mimagoniatites bohemicus

Scientific classification
- Kingdom: Animalia
- Phylum: Mollusca
- Class: Cephalopoda
- Subclass: †Ammonoidea
- Order: †Agoniatitida
- Family: †Mimagoniatitidae
- Genus: †Mimagoniatites; Eichenberg, 1930

= Mimagoniatites =

Mimagoniatites Temporal range: Early Devonian

Extinct genus of molluscs

Mimagoniatites is a genus of ammonoid cephalopod which lived during the early Devonian, regarded as belonging to the family Mimagoniatitidae.

The shell is discoidal, primarily evolute, becoming mildly involute in later growth stage, moderately to rapidly expanding. Whorl section of first two whorls approximately circular, subtrapezoidal in later whorls. Umbilicas perforated, protoconch swollen, not in contact with first whorl. Growth lines biconvex with prominent ventrolateral projections and a deep ventral sinus.
