= Trypanoporida =

Trypanoporida Temporal range: Devonian

Scientific classification
- Kingdom: Animalia
- Class: †Tentaculita
- Order: †Trypanoporida; Weedon, 1991

Genera
- Trypanopora†; Torquaysalpinx†

Trypanoporida is an extinct order of encrusting animals within class Tentaculita, which were common in Devonian oceans (Weedon, 1991). Their affinity is unknown; they have been placed among worms and corals. They appear to be closely related to other taxa of uncertain affinity, including the microconchids, cornulitids, and tentaculitids. Spirally coiled trypanoporids (Devonian) were most likely derived from the geologically older microconchids (Late Ordovician).
