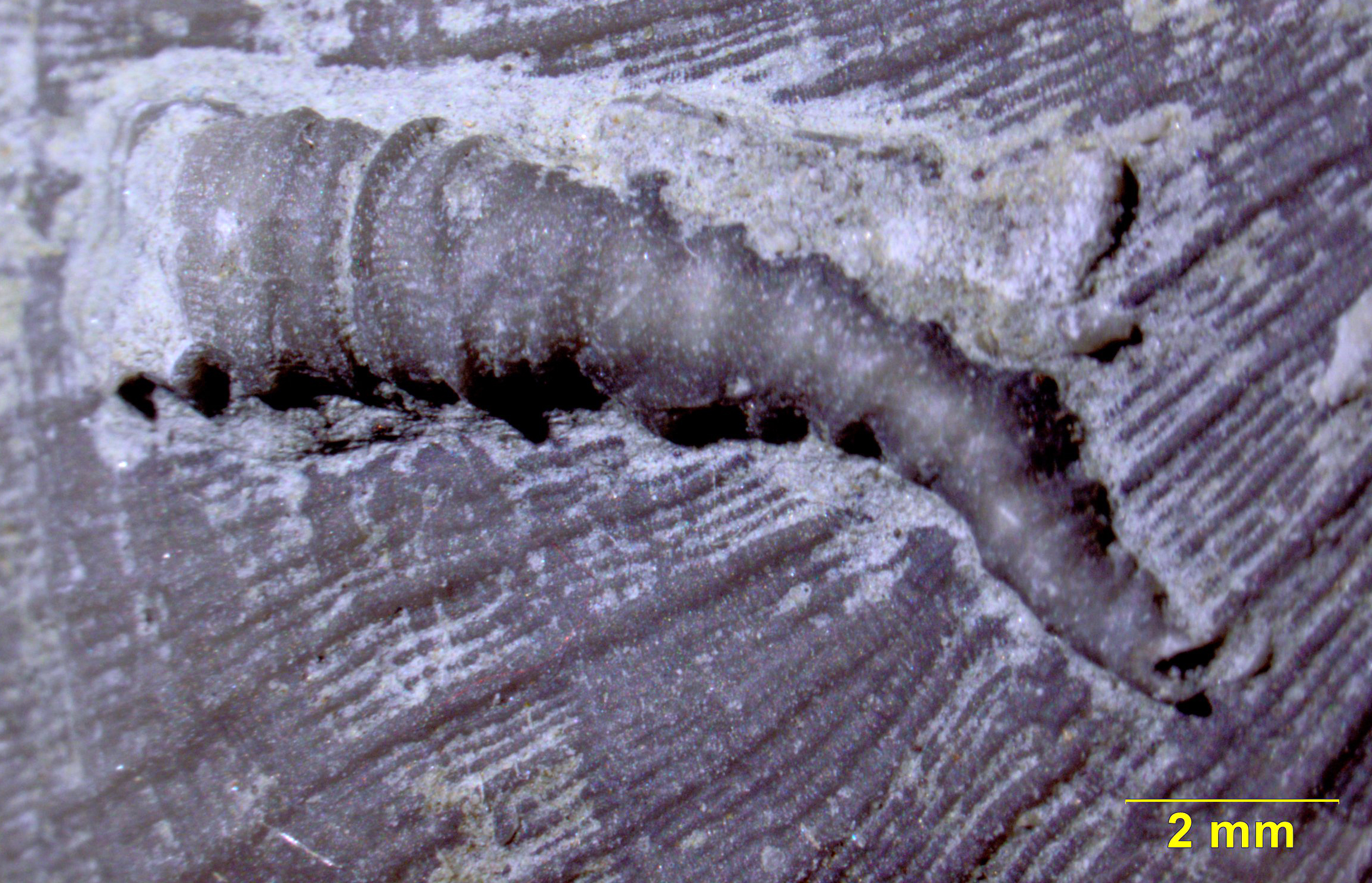
- Cornulitid on a brachiopod valve (Upper Ordovician, SE Indiana)

Scientific classification
- Kingdom: Animalia
- Class: †Tentaculita
- Order: †Cornulitida; Bouček, 1964

Genera
- Conchicolites; Coralloconchus; Cornulitella; Cornulites; Cornulitozoon; Opatozoon; Reticornulites; Septalites

= Cornulitida =

Cornulitida Temporal range: Mid Ordovician–Late Carboniferous

Extinct order of Devonian organisms

Cornulitida is an extinct order of encrusting animals from class Tentaculita, which were common around the globe in the Ordovician to Devonian oceans, and survived until the Carboniferous. Organisms that may be the oldest cornulitids have been found in Cambrian sediments of Jordan.

Cornulitids had shells, and were subject to predation by boring and other means from the Ordovician onwards. Many survived attacks by predators. Several cornulitids were endobiotic symbionts in the stromatoporoids and tabulates.

Their affinity is unknown; they have been placed in many phyla, and have been considered worms, corals, molluscs and more. They appear to be closely related to other taxa of uncertain affinity, including the microconchids, trypanoporids and tentaculitids.

== Gallery ==
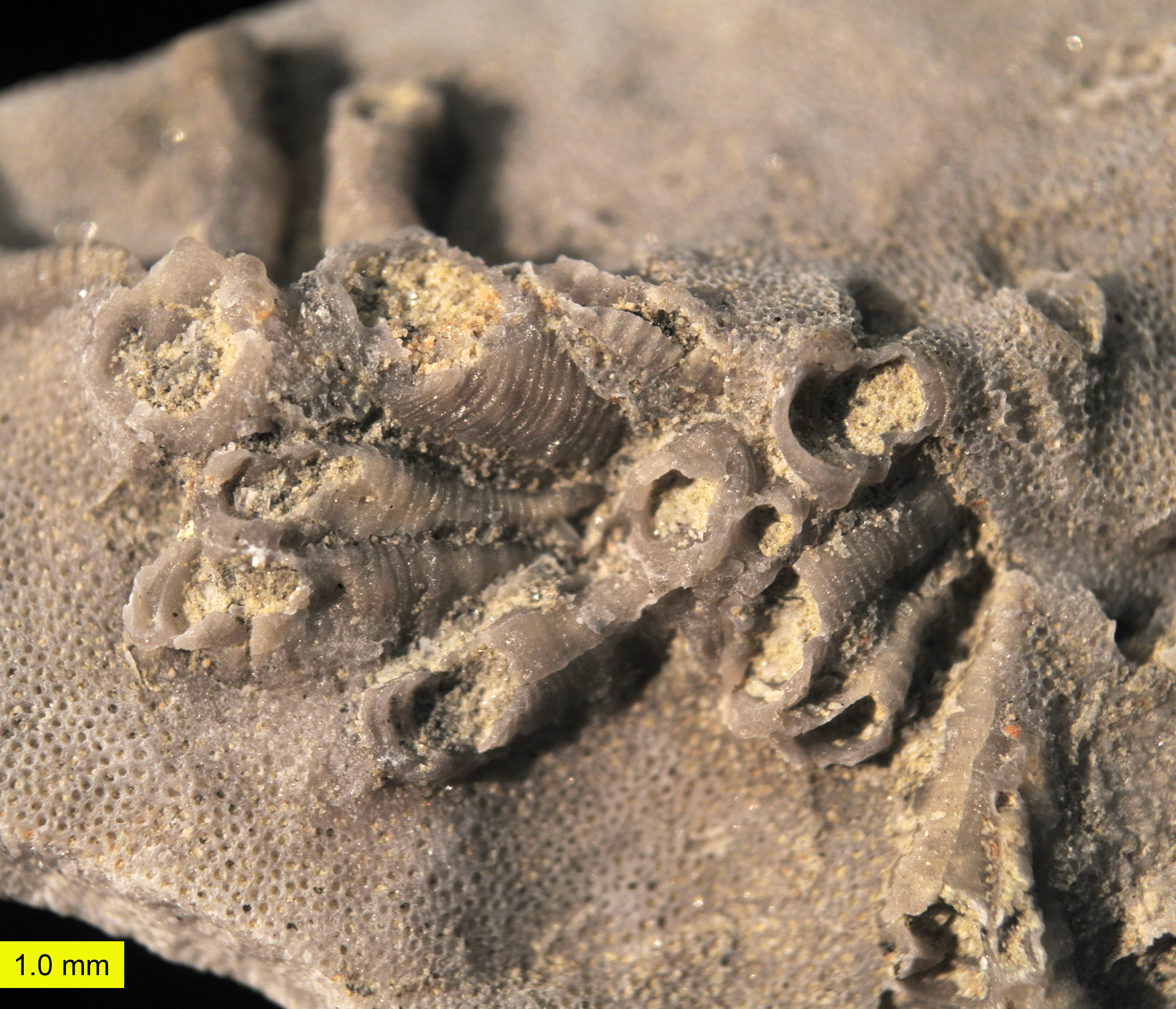
Cornulitids on a bryozoan; Bellevue Member, Grant Lake Formation, northern Kentucky

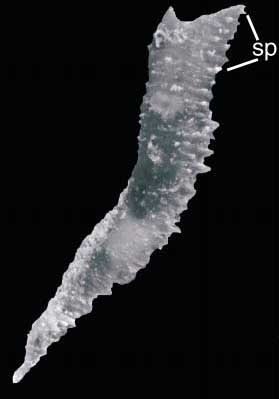
Conchicolites sp. overview of the rings with spines, Lilla Karlsö, Sweden

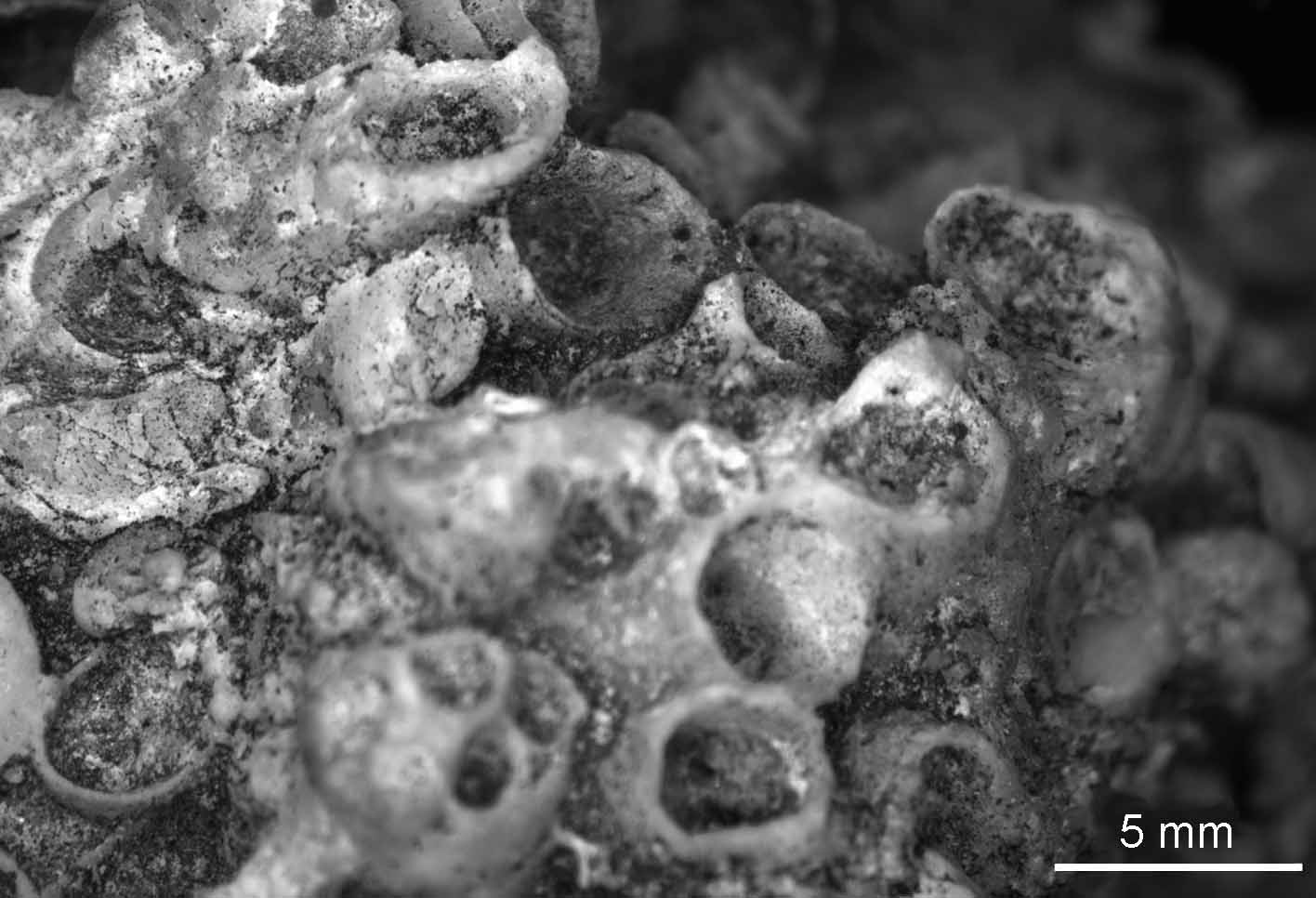
Septalites septatus from the Silurian of Gotland

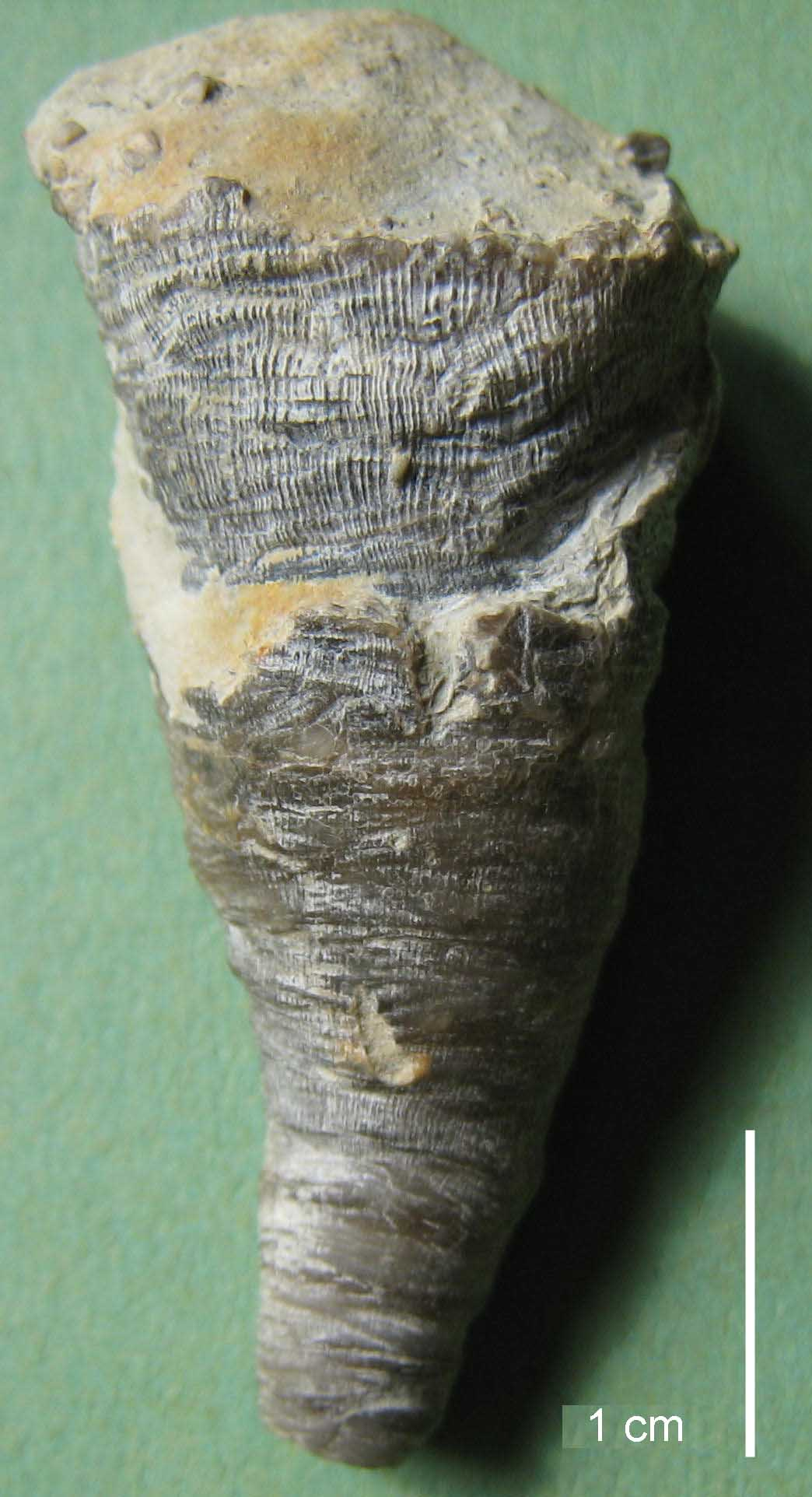
Cornulites cellulosus from Wenlock of Saaremaa, Estonia
