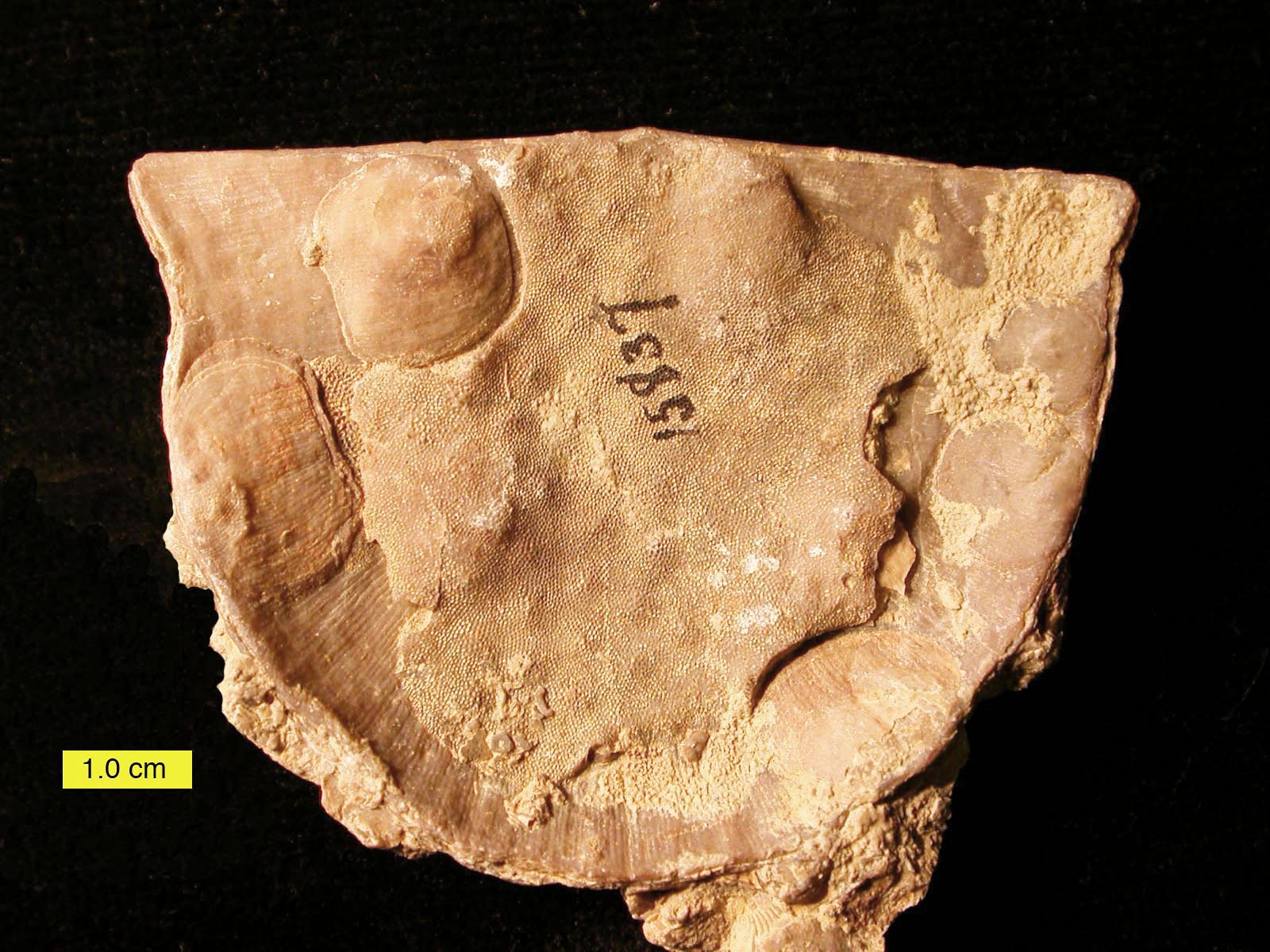
- An Ordovician strophomenid with encrusting inarticulate brachiopods (the craniid Philhedra) and a bryozoan.

Scientific classification
- Kingdom: Animalia
- Phylum: Brachiopoda
- Class: †Strophomenata
- Order: †Strophomenida; Opik, 1934

= Strophomenida =

Strophomenida Temporal range: Ordovician–Permian

Extinct order of brachiopods

Strophomenida is an extinct order of articulate brachiopods which lived from the lower Ordovician period to the mid Carboniferous period. Strophomenida is part of the extinct class Strophomenata, and was the largest known order of brachiopods, encompassing over 400 genera. Some of the largest and heaviest known brachiopod species belong to this class. Strophomenids were among the most diverse and abundant brachiopods during the Ordovician, but their diversity was strongly impacted at the Late Ordovician mass extinction. Survivors rediversified into new morphologies in the Silurian, only to be impacted once again at the Late Devonian mass extinction.

== Description ==
A typical strophomenid possesses a distinct outline, with a strophic(straight) hinge line and rounded commissure. Thus, the average strophomenid could be described as being shaped like a half circle or half oval. Surface ornamentation of strophomenids are variable, with thin, light, and numerous radial ornaments being common. Concentric ornaments may also be spotted, and are prominent in the subfamily Leptaeninae with characteristic concentric wrinkles(rugae). The valves of strophomenids are often concave on one side and convex on the other.

Adult strophomenids lack an opening for the pedicle (stalk), so in life, they either lay free or cemented the ventral valve (lower shell) onto a firm substrate at the umbo (hinge). In juveniles, a tiny hole for the pedicle was present on the ventral valve near the umbo, but this is closed up through development. The dorsal valve was typically concave or flat, though occasionally it was convex; the ventral valve was always convex. The hinge line at the rear of the shell was quite wide and strophic in shape, meaning that it was nearly straight. Many strophomenid shells are wider than long. The interior of the valves have a distinctive pseudopunctate microtexture: deflections in the mineralized shell layers stack up and unfurl into tiny bumps, which are usually supported by calcite rods known as a taleolae.

== Subtaxa (superfamilies) ==
- †Plectambonitoidea (paraphyletic?)
- †Strophomenoidea

== Gallery ==
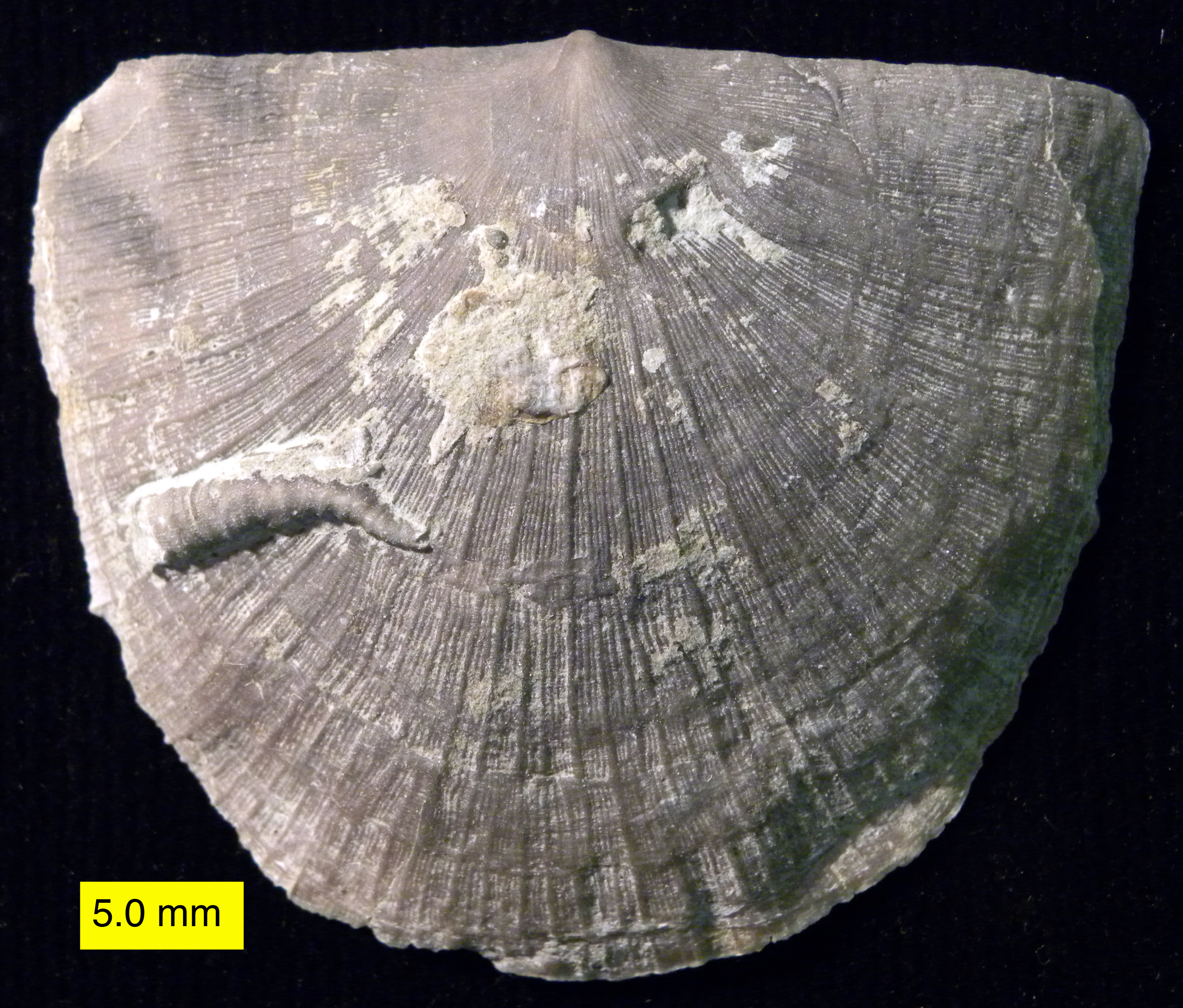
Strophomenid brachiopod with encrusting cornulitid tubeworm (Upper Ordovician, SE Indiana).

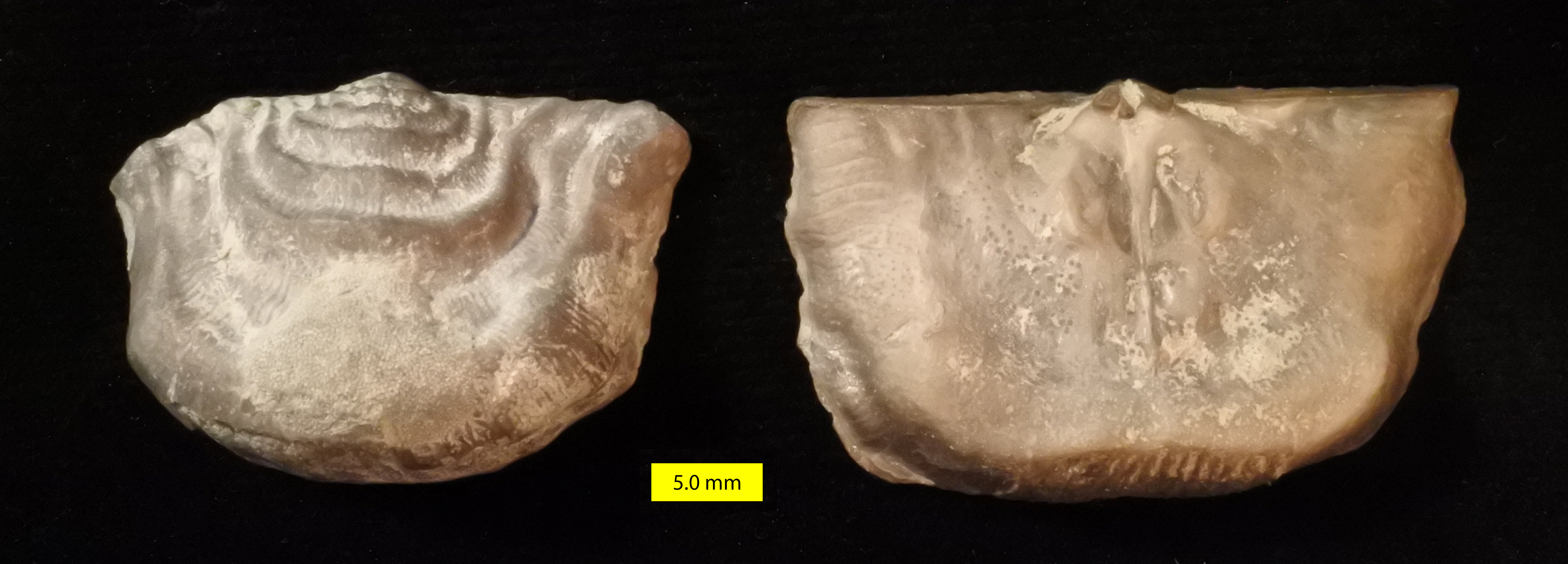
Strophomenid brachiopod Leptaena from the Upper Ordovician of Iowa.
