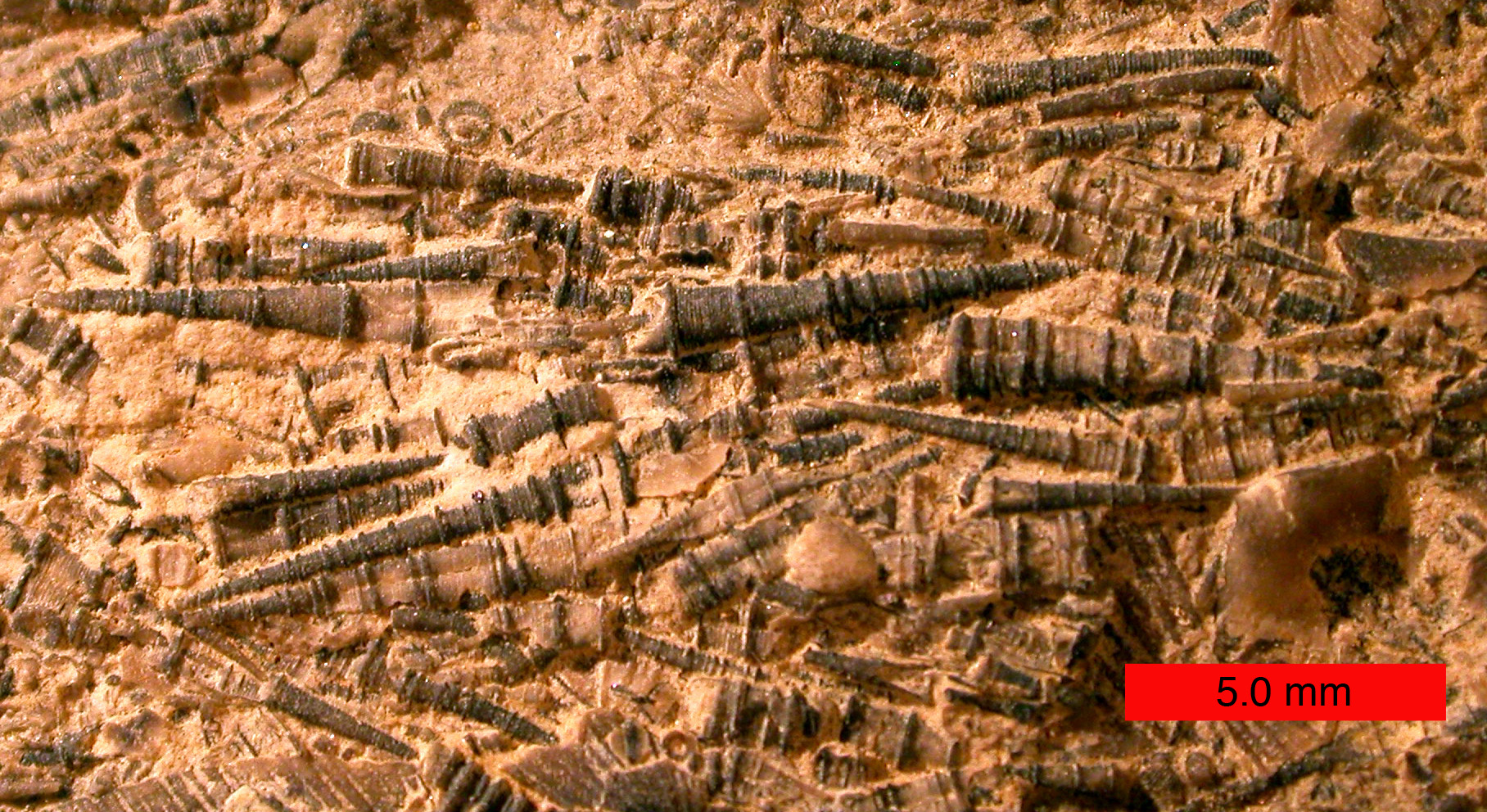
- Tentaculitids from the Devonian of Maryland.

Scientific classification
- Kingdom: Animalia
- Clade: Lophophorata
- Class: †Tentaculita; Bouček, 1964

Subdivisions
- Anticalyptraeida; Anticalyptraea; Lindstroemiella; Chonioconarida; Cornulitida; Dacryoconarida; Microconchida; Tentaculitida; Trypanoporida

Synonyms
- Tentaculitoidea Lyashenko, 1957; Cricoconarida Fisher, 1962

= Tentaculita =

Tentaculita Temporal range: Ordovician–Middle Jurassic Early Ordovician to Middle Jurassic (Vinn 2010)

Extinct class of uncertain affiliation

Tentaculita is an extinct class of lophophorates ranging from the Early Ordovician to the Middle Jurassic. They were suspension feeders with a near worldwide distribution. For a more thorough discussion, see Tentaculites.

The presence of perforate septa and "septal necks" has been used to argue for a cephalopod affinity, whereas the shell microstructure, notably the presence of punctae, points to a brachiopod relationship, and preserved musculature suggests a relationship with bryozoans.

== Subdivisions ==
Subclasses

- Chonioconarida
- Dacryoconarida

Orders

- Anticalyptraeida
  - Anticalyptraea
  - Lindstroemiella
- Cornulitida
- Microconchida
- Tentaculitida
- Trypanoporida

Genera

- Tymbochoos
