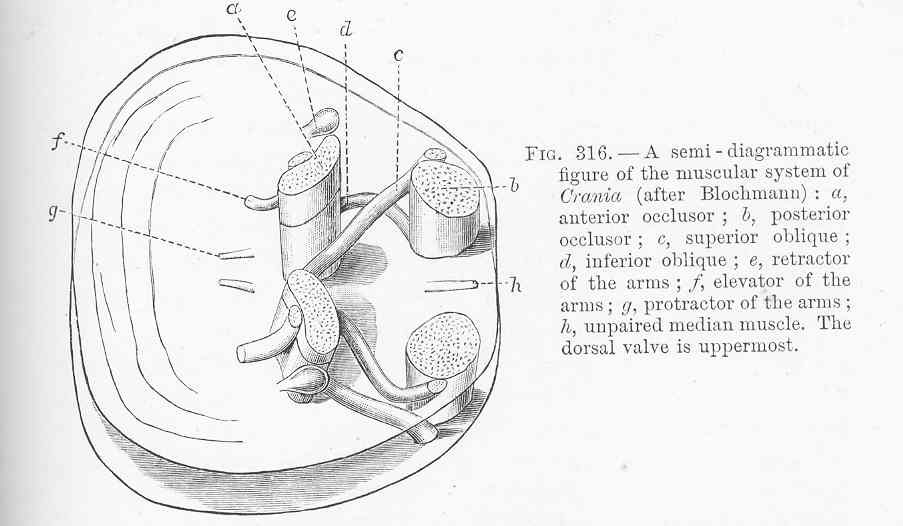

Scientific classification
- Kingdom: Animalia
- Phylum: Brachiopoda
- Class: Craniata
- Order: Craniida
- Family: Craniidae
- Genus: †Crania; Retzius, 1781

Species
- C. craniolaris (Linnaeus, 1758) type species = C. numulus, Anomia craniolaris, Nummulus brattenburgensis (Brattenburgpenningar); C. antiqua Defrance, 1818; C. armata; C. aspera; C. bipartita; C. gracilis; C. intermedia; C. obsoleta; C. personata; C. porosa; C. prisca; C. proavia; C. ringens

= Crania (brachiopod) =

Crania Temporal range: Campanian–Maastrichtian

Genus of brachiopods

Crania is an extinct genus of brachiopods that lived during the Upper Cretaceous.

== Description ==
Crania has small (up to 2 centimetres or 0.79 inches in diameter) circular shells. The dorsal valve is smooth or has slight pustules. The ventral valve is only attached posteriorly and has a thickened flat grainy rim.

== Reassigned species ==
As the genus Crania was erected early on in paleontology, many species have since been reassigned.

- C. abnormis = Ancistrocrania abnormis
- C. austriaca = Danocrania austriaca
- C. barbata = Isocrania barbata
- C. bredai = Ancistrocrania bredai
- C. bromelli = Ancistrocrania bromelli
- C. nysti = Novocrania nysti
- C. californica = Novocrania californica
- C. comosa = Ancistrocrania comosa
- C. costata = Isocrania costata
- C. davidsoni = Ancistrocrania davidsoni
- C. egnabergensis = Isocrania egnabergensis
- C. guelhemensis = Danocrania geulhemensis
- C. hagenowi = Danocrania hagenowi
- C. hawaiiensis = Novocrania hawaiiensis
- C. kressenbergensis = Danocrania kressenbergensis
- C. lecontei = Novocrania lecontei
- C. nysti = Novocrania nysti
- C. parisiensis = Ancistrocrania parisiensis
- C. philippinensis = Novocrania philippinensis
- C. pourtalesi = Novocrania pourtalesi
- C. permiana = Prorichthofenia permiana
- C. quadrangularis = Ancistrocrania quadrangularis
- C. quadrata = Pseudolingula quadrata
- C. retzii = Ancistrocrania retzii
- C. rostrata = Novocrania anomala
- C. spiculata = Acanthocrania spiculata
- C. spinulosa = Danocrania spinulosa
- C. stobaei = Ancistrocrania stobaei
- C. striata = Discina striata
- C. suessi Bosquet, 1859 = Ancistrocrania suessi
- C. suessi Reeve, 1862 = Novocrania japonica
- C. tripartita = Craniscus tripartita
- C. tuberculata = Danocrania tuberculata
- C. turbinata = Novocrania anomala
- C. unguiculata = Siphonotreta unguiculata
- C. valdiviae = Novocrania valdiviae

== See also ==
- List of brachiopod genera
