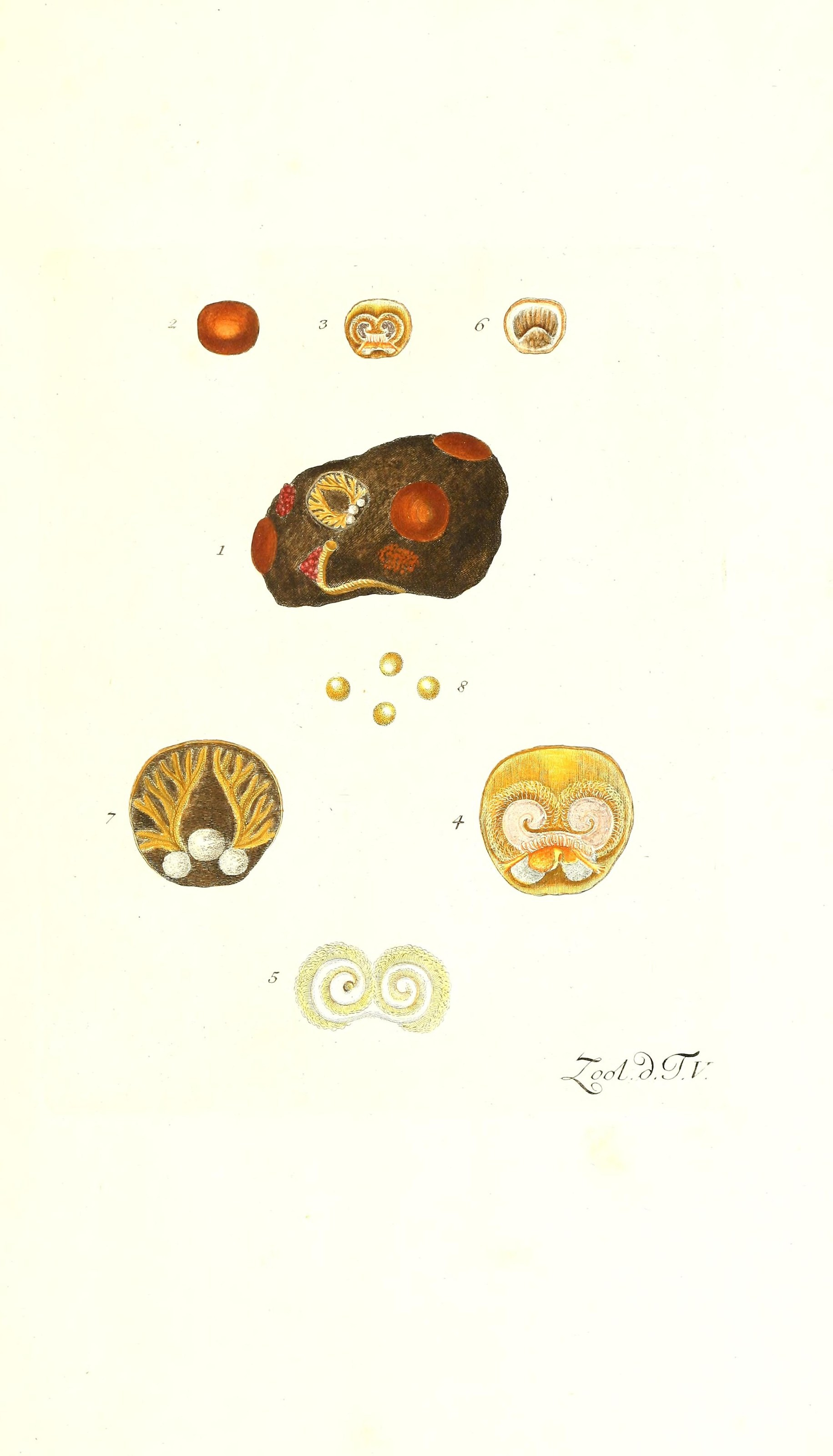
- Illustration from first description of species

Scientific classification
- Kingdom: Animalia
- Phylum: Brachiopoda
- Class: Craniata
- Order: Craniida
- Family: Craniidae
- Genus: Novocrania
- Species: N. anomala

Binomial name
- Novocrania anomala (Müller, 1776)

Synonyms
- Crania anomala (Müller, 1776); Neocrania anomala (Müller, 1776); Patella anomala O. F. Müller, 1776

= Novocrania anomala =

Species of marine lamp shell

Novocrania anomala is a species of brachiopod found offshore in the eastern Atlantic Ocean.

== Distribution and habitat ==
Novocrania anomala is found from the Canary Isles, Ireland, Scotland, the Faeroe Isles, Norway, Iceland and Svalbard. It is found attached to the bedrock and boulders at a depth of up to 1500 metres in sheltered environments where the water movement is low.

== Description ==
In appearance, N. anomala resembles a cockle or limpet with a low conical, oval shell up to fifteen millimetres long. The upper valve is the only part visible as the lower valve is cemented to the rock beneath. The shell surface is smooth, white, buff or pale grey and has fine concentric lines. The outer surface is covered by a thin brown periostracum.

== Biology ==
Novocrania anomala is a filter feeder, using the lophophore between the two valves to selectively catch particles that drift past. It lives for up to ten years but growth is slow after the first year. It is free-spawning with external fertilisation in the water. The eggs sink to the bottom and hatch into free-swimming juveniles. These larvae are fully developed within three days and settle out a few days later, attaching themselves to the substrate. Because N. anomala favours waters with tidal flows of less than one knot, dispersal may be limited.

== Ecology ==
Novocrania anomala is often the dominant species in its environment. It is eaten by starfish, crustacea, gastropods and fish. Compared to molluscs, the shell is easily drilled into and the shells are often heavily bored. However predation seems to be limited, perhaps because the brachiopod is unpalatable.

This species is often found in association with the sea anemone Protanthea simplex in very sheltered deep water, usually on littoral bedrock, silty boulders and rock slopes in fiords and other areas with calm waters. They are often accompanied by the parchment worm Chaetopterus variopedatus, encrusting red algae and the polychaete worm Pomatoceros triqueter. Other members of the community may be the saddle oyster Pododesmus patelliformis and the fan worm Sabella pavonina. Scattered colonies of Alcyonium digitatum are occasionally present along with the hydroid Bougainvillia muscus. The barnacle Balanus balanus and the hermit crab Pagurus bernhardus can often be seen in the vicinity and the squat lobster Munida rugosa may be hiding in crevices nearby.

A range of solitary sea squirts are often present including Ciona intestinalis, Corella parallelogramma, Polycarpa pomaria, Ascidia mentula and Ascidia virginea. Echinoderms such as the brittle star Ophiothrix fragilis are frequently seen with their arms protruding from rock cracks, whilst the starfish Asterias rubens and the sea urchins Echinus esculentus and Psammechinus miliaris occasionally form part of the community, as does the whelk Buccinum undatum.

A survey was undertaken of the marine ecology in deep water off County Kerry in Ireland, The rock and boulders were covered with a fine silt and there were coralline crusts over most surfaces. N. anomala was found on the steep sides and lower parts of boulders while the tube worm Pomatoceros triqueter and the stony coral Caryophyllia smithii predominated on the upper parts.
