= Valdiviathyris quenstedti =

Valdiviathyris quenstedti Temporal range: Eocene–Recent

Scientific classification
- Domain: Eukaryota
- Kingdom: Animalia
- Phylum: Brachiopoda
- Class: Craniata
- Order: Craniida
- Family: Craniidae
- Genus: Valdiviathyris
- Species: V. quenstedti

Binomial name
- Valdiviathyris quenstedti Helmcke, 1940

Species of marine lamp shell

Valdiviathyris quenstedti is a small species of brachiopods with a maximum size of about 0.3 inches or 7.6 millimetres wide.

== Distribution ==
=== Occurrence over time ===
Specimens attributed to V. quenstedti from the Upper Eocene have been found near New Zealand.

=== Recent distribution ===
V. quenstedti has been found near Chile and around New Zealand, but is assumed to be widespread in the Southern Ocean on hard (rock) substrates.

== Ecology ==
V. quenstedti is found in cryptic environments together with species of Novocrania.

== Description ==
The largest specimen found is 6mm length, 7mm wide and 2½mm height. Both valves are very thin and translucent, have small pores (a state called punctate by science) and are obliquely conical in profile with the tip close to the straight posterior margin. The exteriors of the valves have irregular hummocks, and hollows with occasional pustules and some concentric growth lines. The valves vary in shape from subquadrate to subhexagonal, fitting the rock crevice in which it is growing. Some valves are encrusted by Spirorbis worm tubes.

In adulthood, the dorsal valve has a concave rim up to 1mm wide. The outer edge is extremely thin, about 50 μm, and the interior lip of the rim is marked by a coarse granular ridge. The concave rim of the dorsal valve rests upon the convex rim of the ventral valve. The ventral valve convex rim also carries granules that probably interlock with those on the dorsal valve ridge. The posterior margin of the dorsal valve is straight and about 200 μm thick. The inside edge is rounded and fits into a straight posterior trough on the ventral valve, together acting as a hinge. Three pairs of muscle attachment "scars" are arranged in a hexagon, with the largest oval in shape and close to the straight posterior margin of the valves, small ones to the sides and crescent-shaped muscle "scars". The inside of the valves of V. quenstedti each carry two processes on both sides of the midline approximately at its centre, which may grow to almost 1mm long. During the growth of this brachiopod their shape changes from thorns on the inner surface, via tapering cylinders at an angle to the valve and slightly diverging mid-size, to transversely flattened, sub-parallel and erect. These are not the support of the lophophores, which are located to the side of these processes. The dorsal valve contains many pores (or punctae) in radial rows with tiny ridges between them. These punctae entirely perforate the shell, and split in branches outwards repeatedly within the extremely thin valve.

The ventral valve is concave and much thicker near the margin than the dorsal valve (up to 1 mm). It is cemented to the substrate. The raised margin is convex, of variable width (averaging around 1 mm), and sometimes covered with granules. The slightly concave outermost rim is about 200 μm wide, smooth, and within it fits the dorsal valve. The posterior margin is a straight trough. In the central cavity of most specimens a wide ridge begins in the middle, gradually becomes wider and higher and ends steeply. In its centre the valve is very thin or even absent with the rock substrate showing through.
