= Ussuniidae =

Ussuniidae Temporal range: Ordovician (Llandeilo–lower Caradoc)

Scientific classification
- Kingdom: Animalia
- Phylum: Brachiopoda
- Class: Craniata
- Order: †Trimerellida
- Superfamily: †Trimerelloidea
- Family: †Ussuniidae

Genera
- Ussunia

Extinct family of marine lamp shells

Ussuniidae is a monogeneric family of Ordovician brachiopods aligned with the Trimerellids, but showing additional similarities to the craniids and considered intermediate in morphology.
