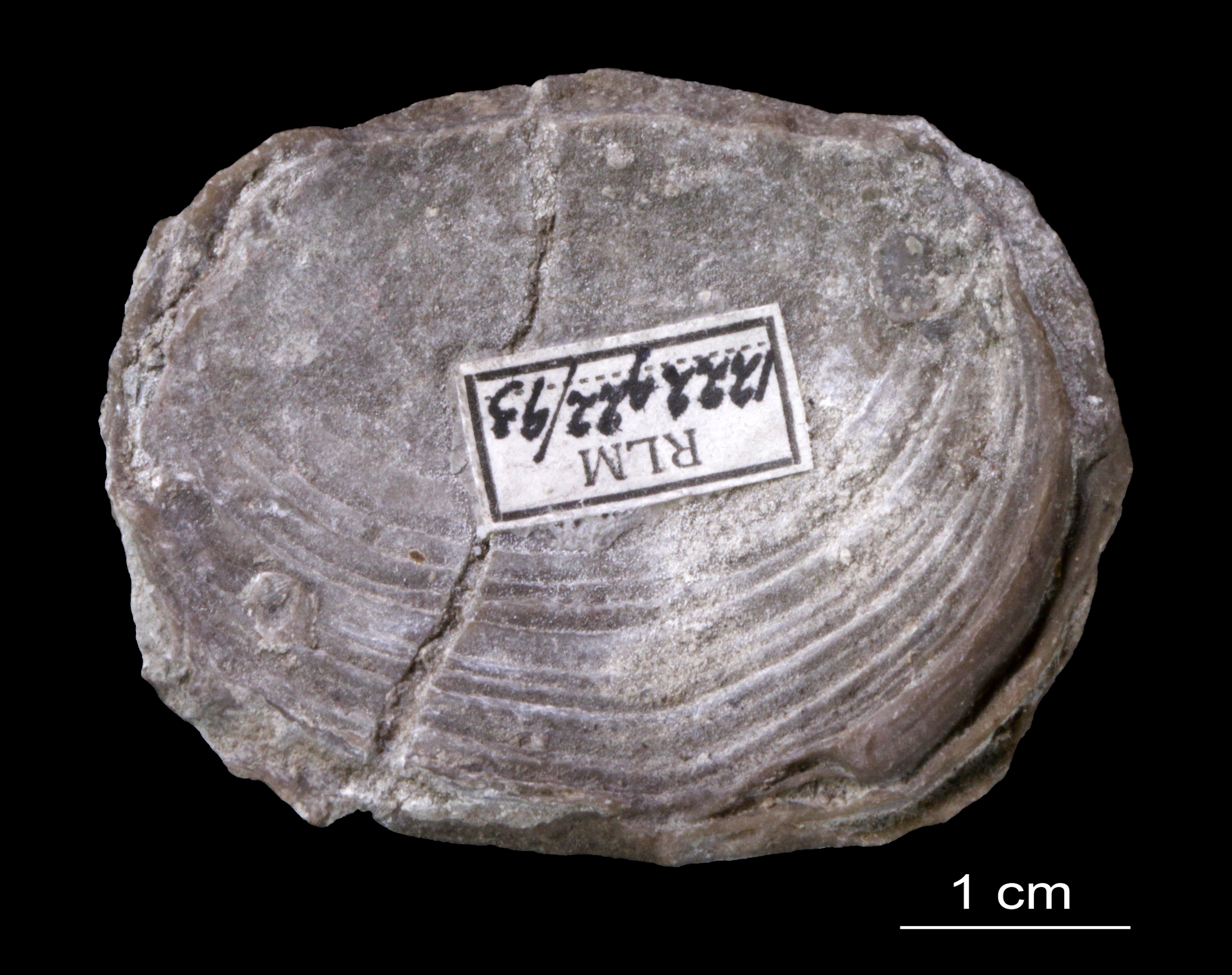
- Dinobolus davidsoni, a trimerellid from the Silurian of Estonia

Scientific classification
- Kingdom: Animalia
- Phylum: Brachiopoda
- Class: Craniata
- Order: †Trimerellida; Gorjansky & Popov, 1985
- Superfamily: †Trimerelloidea; Davidson & King, 1872

Families
- See text.

= Trimerellida =

Trimerellida Temporal range: Darriwilian–Ludlow

Extinct order of brachiopods

Trimerellida is an extinct order of craniate brachiopods, containing the sole superfamily Trimerelloidea and the families Adensuidae, Trimerellidae, and Ussuniidae. Trimerellidae was a widespread family of warm-water brachiopods ranging from the Middle Ordovician ("Llandeilo" / Darriwilian) to the late Silurian (Ludlow). Adensuidae and Ussuniidae are monogeneric families restricted to the Ordovician of Kazakhstan. Most individuals were free-living, though some (namely Australian populations of the genus Eodinobolus) clustered into large congregations similar to modern oyster reefs.

== Evolution ==
Trimerellides probably originated from tropical island arcs in the region of Kazakhstania (present-day Kazakhstan) during the "Llandeilo" (late Darriwilian stage). By the late Sandbian and early Katian stages, many dispersed eastward to nearby regions equivalent to South China and Australia. A few managed to populate the vicinity of Laurentia (North America), possibly through its diminishing proximity to the Australian portion of Gondwana. By the late Katian, trimerellides had also dispersed westward, populating the seas around Baltica (eastern Europe), Scotland, and Siberia. Trimerellides were an exclusively tropical group, with most genera endemic to a specific region. There are some exceptions: Eodinobolus and Monomerella were particularly widespread, found at low-latitude ecosystems worldwide. At their acme in the late Katian, trimerellides reached the highest diversity ever seen among craniiform brachiopods, forming a significant component of brachiopod assemblages worldwide.

Trimerellide diversity collapsed during global cooling in the first pulse of the Late Ordovician mass extinction. This fate was shared by several other orders of "inarticulate" brachiopods. Trimerellides are an example of a Lazarus taxon: their fossils are absent from the Hirnantian (last stage of the Ordovician) and the Rhuddanian (first stage of the Silurian), with only a few new Silurian genera afterwards. Silurian species were most likely descended from relictual survivors in South China and Australia. Trimerellides managed to recover slightly during the late Wenlock Epoch (mid-Silurian), experiencing a mild rediversification at the species level. New species emphasized deeper muscle attachments relative to most of their Ordovician counterparts. Silurian trimerellide species may have been too specialized to adapt to rapid changes, resulting in their total extinction in the Ludlow Epoch.

== Anatomy ==
Trimerellides are massive by the standards of early brachiopods. They have fairly smooth and unornamented shells, which were probably aragonitic in composition. The shells are unequally biconvex (both valves convex to different degrees), in some cases nearly spherical in shape. There is no opening for the pedicle. Trimerellides show some similarities to rhynchonelliform ("articulate") brachiopods, including mixoperipheral shell growth (where the valves converge towards each other) and the development a fixed hinge at the back of the shell. In trimerellides, this hinge is an articulation between a wide plate on the dorsal valve and a socket-like groove on the ventral valve, opposite to the socket-and-teeth articulation of rhynchonelliforms.

Like other craniate brachiopods, the musculature consisted of two pairs of large and vertically-oriented adductor muscles (which close the shell) alongside two pairs of horizontally-oriented oblique muscles (which slide each valve past each other). The inner (internal) pair of oblique muscles extend nearly straight back to the dorsal valve hinge plate. This contrasts with craniids and craniopsids, where the oblique internals splay out and attach besides the posterior adductors. A shelf is usually present near the middle of each valve, in front of the attachments for the anterior adductors. In later trimerellides especially, the anterior adductors sockets are deep vaulted pockets hollowed out from the internal surface of each valve.

== Subgroups ==
From the Treatise on Invertebrate Paleontology Part H, Revised (unless stated otherwise):

- Family Adensuidae Popov & Rukavishnikova, 1986
  - Adensu Popov & Rukavishnikova, 1986 [Upper Ordovician ("Caradoc" – "Ashgill")]
- Family Trimerellidae Davidson & King, 1872
  - Belubula Percival, 1995 [Upper Ordovician ("Caradoc" – "Ashgill"?)]
  - Bowanpodium Percival, 1995 [Upper Ordovician ("Caradoc")]
  - Corystops Percival, 1995 [Upper Ordovician ("Caradoc")]
  - Costitrimella Rong & Li, 1993 [Upper Ordovician ("Ashgill")]
  - Dinobolus Hall, 1871 [lower-mid Silurian (Llandovery – Wenlock)]
  - Eodinobolus Rowell, 1963 [Upper Ordovician ("Caradoc" – "Ashgill")]
  - Fengzuella Li & Han, 1980 [Upper Ordovician ("Ashgill")]
  - Gasconsia Northrop, 1939 [Upper Ordovician ("Ashgill") – upper Silurian (Ludlow)]
  - Gyroselenella? Li, 1985 = Selenella [Upper Ordovician ("Ashgill")]
  - Keteiodoros Strusz et al., 1998 [mid-Silurian (Wenlock)]
  - Monomerella Billings, 1871 [Upper Ordovician ("Caradoc") – mid-Silurian (Wenlock)]
  - Ovidiella Nikitin & Popov, 1984 [Middle Ordovician ("Llandeilo") – Upper Ordovician ("Caradoc")]
  - Palaeotrimerella Li & Han, 1980 [Middle Ordovician ("Llandeilo") – Upper Ordovician ("Ashgill")]
  - Paradinobolus Li & Han, 1980 [Upper Ordovician ("Ashgill")]
  - Peritrimerella Liang, 1983 [Upper Ordovician ("Ashgill")]
  - Porcidium Percival, 1995 [Upper Ordovician ("Caradoc")]
  - Rhynobolus Hall, 1871 [mid-Silurian (Wenlock)]
  - Sinotrimerella Li & Han, 1980 [Upper Ordovician ("Ashgill")]
  - Trimerella Billings, 1862 [Upper Ordovician ("Ashgill") – mid-Silurian (Wenlock)]
  - Yidurella Zeng, 1987 [lower Silurian]
- Family Ussuniidae Nikitin & Popov, 1984
  - Ussunia Nikitin & Popov, 1984 [Middle Ordovician ("Llandeilo") – Upper Ordovician ("Caradoc")]

== Bibliography ==
- Modzalevskaya, Tatyana Lvovna (2003). "Silurian and Devonian brachiopods from Severnaya Zemlya" (Russian Arctic). Geodiversitas 25 (1). pp. 73–107.
