= Craniopsidae =

Craniopsidae Temporal range: Middle Cambrian–Tournaisian

Scientific classification
- Kingdom: Animalia
- Phylum: Brachiopoda
- Class: Craniata
- Order: †Craniopsida; Gorjansky & Popov, 1985
- Superfamily: †Craniopsoidea; Williams, 1963
- Family: †Craniopsidae; Williams, 1963

Genera
- See text.

Synonyms
- Sanxiaella

Extinct family of brachiopods

Craniopsidae is an extinct family of craniiform brachiopods which lived from the mid-Cambrian to the Lower Carboniferous (Tournaisian). It is the only family in the monotypic superfamily Craniopsoidea and the monotypic order Craniopsida. If one includes the ambiguous Cambrian genus Discinopsis, craniopsids were the first craniiforms to appear, and may be ancestral to craniids and trimerellides. An even earlier Cambrian genus, Heliomedusa, has sometimes been identified as a craniopsid. More recently, Heliomedusa has been considered a stem-group brachiopod related to Mickwitzia.

Craniopsids are among the simplest of brachiopods, with few identifiable features shared between genera. The calcitic shell is rounded in profile and biconvex, with both valves equally convex. Like other craniiforms, they had two pairs of adductor (vertical closing) muscles and two pairs of oblique (diagonal sliding) muscles, with the muscle scars shifted to just behind the center of the shell. They show some similarities with kirengellids, a group of problematic Cambrian fossils representing the shells of marine organisms.

== List of genera ==
- †Craniops Hall, 1859 [Upper Ordovician ("Caradoc") – Lower Carboniferous (late Tournaisian)]
- †Discinopsis? Hall & Clarke 1892 [mid-Cambrian]
- †Lingulapholis Schuchert 1913 [Devonian]
- †Paracraniops Williams 1963 [Upper Ordovician ("Caradoc") – early Silurian (Llandovery)]
- †Pseudopholidops Bekker, 1921 [Ordovician]
- †Wrightiops Popov and Cocks 2014 [Upper Ordovician (Katian)]
