= Gasconsia =

Scientific classification
- Domain: Eukaryota
- Kingdom: Animalia
- Phylum: Brachiopoda
- Class: Craniata
- Order: †Trimerellida
- Family: †Trimerellidae
- Genus: †Gasconsia; Northrop 1939

Species
- Gasconsia gigantea; Gasconsia schucherti (type); Gasconsia transversa; Gasconsia worsleyi

Extinct genus of marine lamp shells

Gasconsia is a genus of (aragonitic) Trimerellid brachiopod.
