= Craniops =

Craniops Temporal range: 488.3–354.0 Ma

Scientific classification
- Kingdom: Animalia
- Phylum: Brachiopoda
- Class: Craniata
- Order: †Craniopsida
- Family: †Craniopsidae
- Genus: †Craniops; Hall, 1859

Species
- †Craniops antiquus (Schlotheim, 1822); †Craniops brussai Benedetto, Lavié & Salas, 2024; †Craniops curvata (Bekker, 1921); †Craniops elegans (Bekker, 1921); †Craniops estona (Bekker, 1921); †Craniops implicatus (J. de C. Sowerby, 1839); †Craniops hamiltoniae Hall, 1867; †Craniops infrasilurica (Huene, 1899); †Craniops obtusa (Bekker, 1921); †Craniops pristina Popov & Cocks, 2014; †Craniops speculum Benedetto, Lavié & Salas, 2024; †Craniops subtruncata Hall, 1847; †Craniops tenuis Cooper, 1956

Extinct genus of brachiopods

Craniops is an extinct genus of brachiopods in the family Craniopsidae with species known from the Ordovician to the Devonian periods of the Palaeozoic era.

== Distribution ==
C. curvata, C. elegans, C. estona and C. obtusa are from the Kukruse Stage (Ordovician) of Kohtla-Järve, in north-eastern Estonia.

C.brussai and C. speculum are from the Silurian Los Espejos Formation in the Precordillera Basin in Argentina.

C. tenuis is from the Pooleville Member of the Bromide Formation from the Middle and Upper Ordovician of Oklahoma.

== Palaeobiology ==
=== Life history ===
Craniops underwent a lecithotrophic larval stage during its ontogeny.

== See also ==
- List of brachiopod genera
