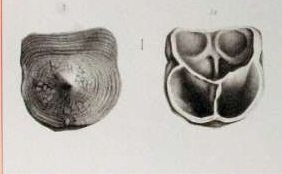
- Craniscus tripartitus

Scientific classification
- Kingdom: Animalia
- Phylum: Brachiopoda
- Class: Craniata
- Order: Craniida
- Family: Craniidae
- Genus: Craniscus; Dall, 1871

Species
- C. tripartitus (Münster, 1840) type species = Crania tripartita, Lower Oxfordian; C. suevica (Quenstedt, 1857) = Crania suevica, Upper Oxfordian; C. japonicus (Adams, 1863) = Crania japonica, recent; C. quadrangularis (Tate, 1893) = Crania quadrangularis non C. quadrangularis (Lundgren, 1885)

= Craniscus =

Craniscus Temporal range: Upper Jurassic–Recent

Genus of brachiopods

Craniscus is a genus of small brachiopods (lamp shells). The shell is approximately round to square with one side rounded. The ventral valve is approximately flat and attached to the underground by the entire surface. The outside of the dorsal valve is more or less conical, the inside is divided by three ridges that join in the center.
