= Munida affinis =

Scientific classification
- Domain: Eukaryota
- Kingdom: Animalia
- Phylum: Arthropoda
- Class: Malacostraca
- Order: Decapoda
- Suborder: Pleocyemata
- Infraorder: Anomura
- Family: Munididae
- Genus: Munida
- Species: M. affinis

Binomial name
- Munida affinis A. Milne Edwards, 1880

Species of crustacean

Munida affinis is a species of squat lobster in the family Munididae. It is found off of Cuba, at depths between about 360 and 550 metres (1,180 and 1,800 ft).
