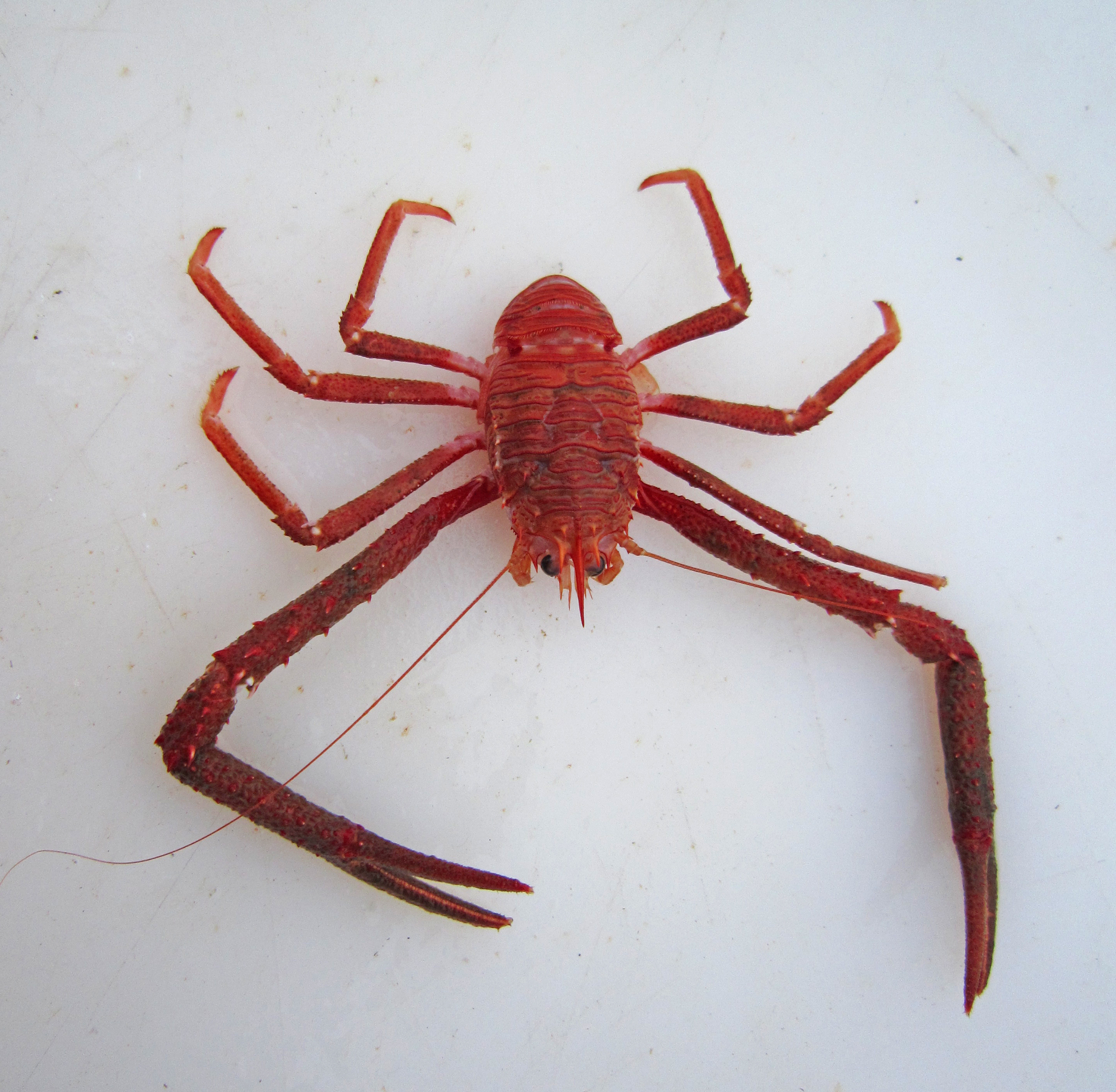

Scientific classification
- Kingdom: Animalia
- Phylum: Arthropoda
- Clade: Pancrustacea
- Class: Malacostraca
- Order: Decapoda
- Suborder: Pleocyemata
- Infraorder: Anomura
- Family: Munididae
- Genus: Munida
- Species: M. quadrispina

Binomial name
- Munida quadrispina Benedict, 1902

= Munida quadrispina =

Species of crustacean

Munida quadrispina is a species of squat lobster. It was originally introduced to science by James E. Benedict in 1902. This and other species of squat lobsters are sometimes referred to as "pinch bugs".

== Description ==
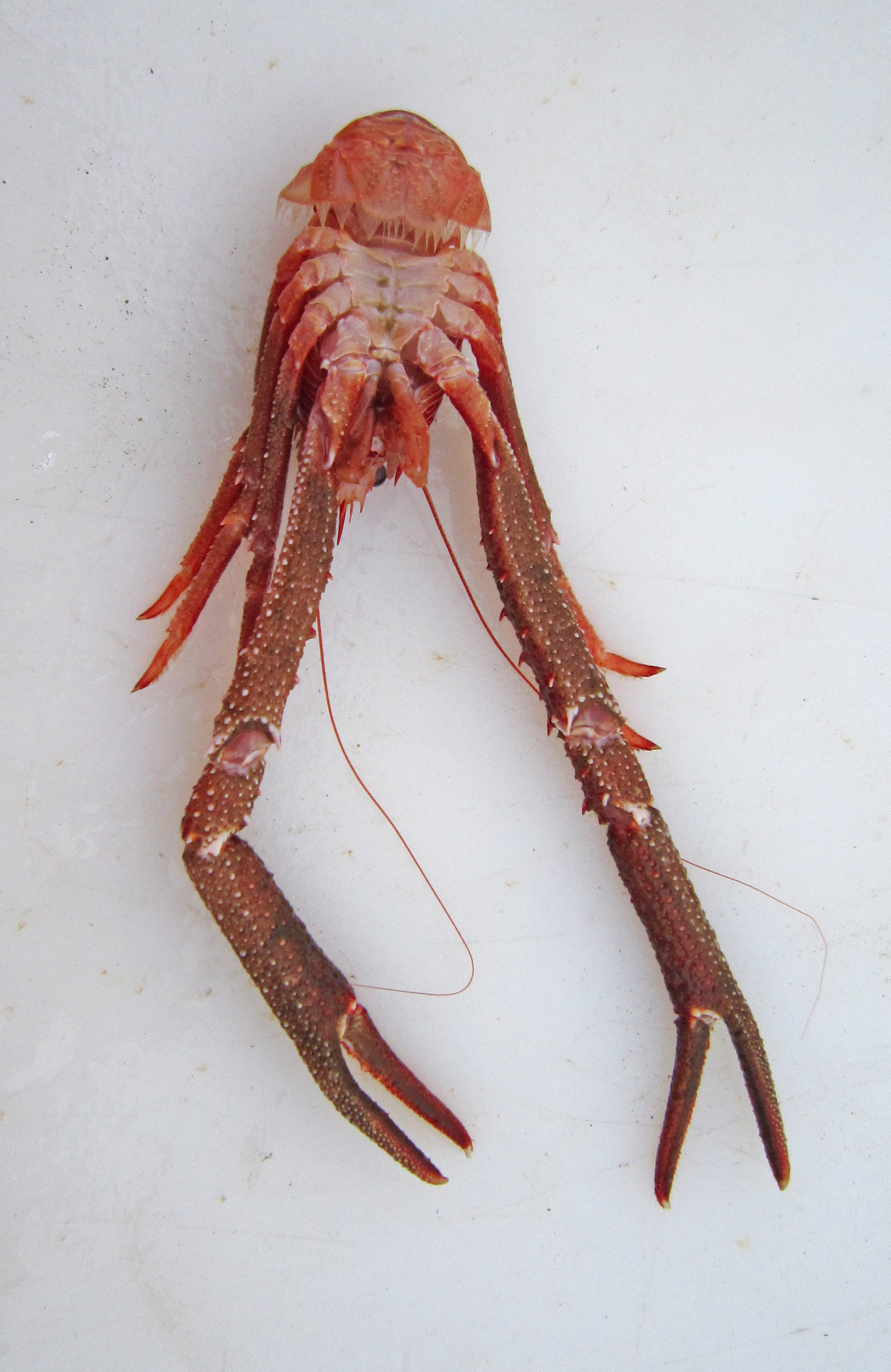
Munida quadrispina - ventral view

Munida quadrispina is brick red on its upper, dorsal side, and lighter colored underneath on its ventral side. The claws, chelipeds, are exceptionally long. There are small spines on the chelipeds. There are three pair of thin walking legs. The tail, telson, and large uropods on either side of the tail create a large tail fan. These animals can swim backwards rapidly by flexing their tail fan. The eyes are pigmented. The carapace of this animal may be up to 6.7 cm (2.6") long, but the chellipeds may be several times longer.

== Habitat ==
This squat lobster is found in Eastern Pacific waters from Sitka, Alaska to the Coronado Islands, Baja California, including Puget Sound. It is found in water depths from 12 to 1463 meters. These animals favor rocky bottoms and rock faces in areas of low current. The low current often results in a silty habitat. There is evidence that this species can tolerate low oxygen concentrations.

== Life history ==
These crabs forage on the bottom, eating detritus, carrion, plankton, and benthic shrimp. They hide from predators in rock crevices and under cobbles. Their long claws allow them to feed from the safety of these recesses. They are found on deep water sponges in British Columbia. Unlike most other species of squat lobsters, Munida quadrispina juveniles are pelagic, swimming freely in the sea, foraging on plankton, before they mature and settle to the bottom.

== Edibility ==
There are commercial fisheries for several species of squat lobster, and even an experiment serving them at Long John Silver's, but there is no commercial fishery for Munida quadrispina. This species is not listed in the Food and Drug Administration's Seafood List. They are, however, occasionally caught in recreational prawn traps and adventurous chefs have prepared them as they might other crabs. They are reported safe for human consumption.
