= Munida acacia =

Scientific classification
- Domain: Eukaryota
- Kingdom: Animalia
- Phylum: Arthropoda
- Class: Malacostraca
- Order: Decapoda
- Suborder: Pleocyemata
- Infraorder: Anomura
- Family: Munididae
- Genus: Munida
- Species: M. acacia

Binomial name
- Munida acacia Ahyong, 2007

Species of crustacean

Munida acacia is a species of squat lobster in the family Munididae. The species name is derived from the genus Acacia, referring to the spiny exterior margin of the propodi of the second and third pereopods. It is found near the western portion of Norfolk Ridge, at depths between about 510 and 560 metres (1,670 and 1,840 ft).
