= Valdiviathyris =

Valdiviathyris Temporal range: Silurian–Recent

Scientific classification
- Kingdom: Animalia
- Phylum: Brachiopoda
- Class: Craniata
- Order: Craniida
- Family: Craniidae
- Genus: Valdiviathyris; Helmcke, 1940

Type species
- Valdiviathyris quenstedti Helmcke, 1940

Species
- V. quenstedti Helmcke, 1940 Late Eocene to recent; V. bicornis Holmer, Popov & Bassett, 2013 Silurian

Genus of brachiopods

Valdiviathyris is a genus of craniate brachiopods that has changed little since the Silurian, from when fossils are known. The extant species V. quenstedti is known from the late Eocene.

It was initially known only from the holotype collected from the southern Indian Ocean, near Île Saint-Paul, at a depth of 672 metres (2,205 ft). The specimen is considered to be adolescent and has a thin (0.1 mm (100 μm; 3.9-thou) thick) calcareous dorsal valve. This has an irregular conical shape, with the tip (or apex) not coinciding with the middle, and is on the outside only adorned by growth lines. On the inside it has pits (or punctae) that branch into four or five canals further to the outside. More recent specimens have been found near New Zealand. Since no fossils of Vadiviathyris have yet been found dating between the Silurian and the Eocene, this genus is currently regarded as a Lazarus taxon.
