= Chronospecies =

Species derived from extinct ancestor

In palaeontology, the evidence for species and evolution comes mainly from the comparative anatomy of fossils. A chronospecies is defined in a single lineage (solid line) whose morphology changes with time. At some point, palaeontologists judge that enough change has occurred that two forms (A and B), separated in time and anatomy, once existed. If only sporadic examples of each survive in the fossil record, the forms will appear sharply distinct.

A chronospecies is a species derived from a sequential development pattern that involves continual and uniform changes from an extinct ancestral form on an evolutionary scale. The sequence of alterations eventually produces a population that is physically, morphologically, and/or genetically distinct from the original ancestors. Throughout the change, there is only one species in the lineage at any point in time, as opposed to cases where divergent evolution produces contemporary species with a common ancestor. The related term paleospecies (or palaeospecies) indicates an extinct species only identified with fossil material. That identification relies on distinct similarities between the earlier fossil specimens and some proposed descendant although the exact relationship to the later species is not always defined. In particular, the range of variation within all the early fossil specimens does not exceed the observed range that exists in the later species.

A paleosubspecies (or palaeosubspecies) identifies an extinct subspecies that evolved into the currently-existing form. The connection with relatively-recent variations, usually from the Late Pleistocene, often relies on the additional information available in subfossil material. Most of the current species have changed in size and so adapted to the climatic changes during the last ice age (see Bergmann's Rule).

The further identification of fossil specimens as part of a "chronospecies" relies on additional similarities that more strongly indicate a specific relationship with a known species. For example, relatively recent specimens, hundreds of thousands to a few million years old with consistent variations (such as always smaller but with the same proportions) as a living species might represent the final step in a chronospecies. The possible identification of the immediate ancestor of the living taxon may also rely on stratigraphic information to establish the age of the specimens.

The concept of chronospecies is related to the phyletic gradualism model of evolution, and it also relies on an extensive fossil record since morphological changes accumulate over time, and two very different organisms could be connected by a series of intermediaries.

== Examples ==
- Bison (several paleospecies and -subspecies)
- Marine sloths (paleospecies)
- Coragyps (chronospecies)
- Gymnogyps (paleospecies)
- Panthera (numerous chrono- and paleospecies and -subspecies)
- Valdiviathyris (no visible change since the Priabonian, 35 million years ago)

== See also ==
- Orthogenesis
