= Munida alia =

Scientific classification
- Kingdom: Animalia
- Phylum: Arthropoda
- Clade: Pancrustacea
- Class: Malacostraca
- Order: Decapoda
- Suborder: Pleocyemata
- Infraorder: Anomura
- Family: Munididae
- Genus: Munida
- Species: M. alia

Binomial name
- Munida alia Baba, 1994

Species of crustacean

Munida alia is a species of squat lobster in the family Munididae. The specific epithet is derived from the Latin alius, meaning "another", in reference to the other species that are centered around M. heteracantha. M. alia is found off of central Queensland, at depths between about 490 and 510 metres (1,610 and 1,670 ft).
