= Munida abelloi =

Scientific classification
- Kingdom: Animalia
- Phylum: Arthropoda
- Class: Malacostraca
- Order: Decapoda
- Suborder: Pleocyemata
- Infraorder: Anomura
- Family: Munididae
- Genus: Munida
- Species: M. abelloi

Binomial name
- Munida abelloi Macpherson, 1994

Species of crustacean

Munida abelloi is a species of squat lobster in the family Munididae. The species name is dedicated to Pere Abellô. It is found off of Kiribati and Futuna Island, at depths between about 105 and 400 metres (344 and 1,312 ft).
