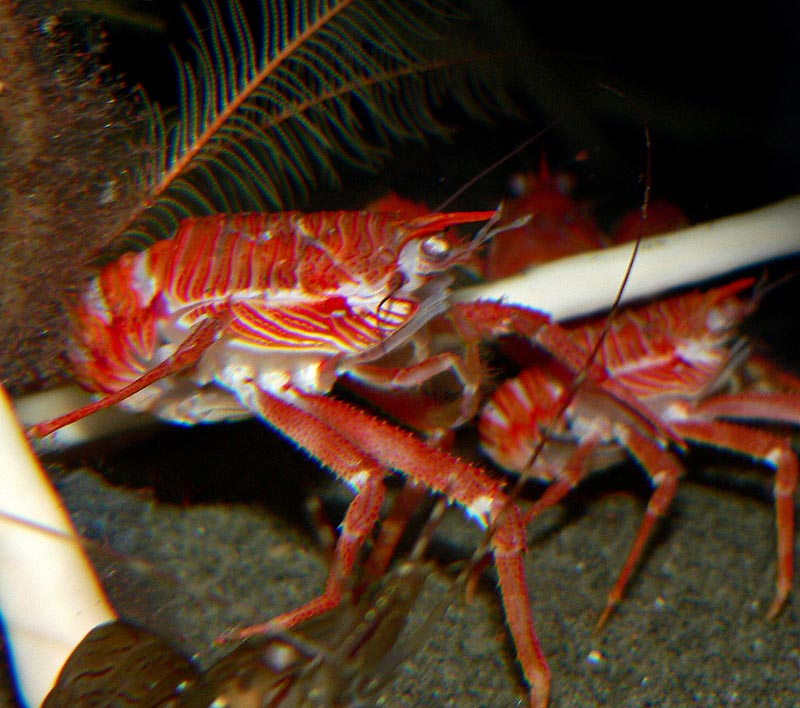
- Munida quadrispina

Scientific classification
- Domain: Eukaryota
- Kingdom: Animalia
- Phylum: Arthropoda
- Class: Malacostraca
- Order: Decapoda
- Suborder: Pleocyemata
- Infraorder: Anomura
- Family: Munididae
- Genus: Munida; Leach, 1820

Type species
- Pagurus rugosus Fabricius, 1775

= Munida =

Genus of crustaceans

Munida is the largest genus of squat lobsters in the family Munididae, with over 240 species.

== Species ==
- Munida abelloi Macpherson, 1994
- Munida acacia Ahyong, 2007
- Munida acantha Macpherson, 1994
- Munida acola Macpherson, 2009
- Munida aequalis Ahyong & Poore, 2004
- Munida affinis A. Milne Edwards 1880
- Munida africana Balss, 1913
- Munida agave Macpherson & Baba, 1993
- Munida albiapicula Baba & Yu, 1987
- Munida alia Baba, 1994
- Munida alonsoi Macpherson, 1994
- Munida amathea Macpherson & de Saint Laurent, 1991
- Munida amblytes Macpherson, 1994
- Munida andamanica Alcock, 1894
- Munida angulata Benedict 1902
- Munida angusta Macpherson, 2004
- Munida antliae Macpherson, 2006
- Munida antonbruuni Tirmizi & Javed, 1980
- Munida apheles Macpherson, 2006
- Munida apodis Macpherson, 2004
- Munida arabica Tirmizi & Javed, 1992
- Munida arae Macpherson, 2006
- Munida armata Baba, 1988
- Munida armilla Macpherson, 1994
- Munida asprosoma Ahyong & Poore, 2004
- Munida atlantica de Melo-Fihlo & de Melo, 1994
- Munida aulakodes Macpherson, 2006
- Munida babai Tirmizi & Javed, 1976
- Munida bapensis Hendrickx, 2000
- Munida barangei Macpherson, 1994
- Munida barbeti Galil, 1999
- Munida beanii Verrill, 1908
- Munida benedicti Chace, 1942
- Munida benguela de Saint Laurent & Macpherson, 1988
- Munida brachytes Macpherson, 1994
- Munida caesura Macpherson & Baba, 1993
- Munida carinata Baba, 2005
- Munida cerisa Ahyong, 2007
- Munida chacei de Melo-Fihlo and de Melo, 1992
- Munida chathamensis Baba, 1974
- Munida chydaea Ahyong & Poore, 2004
- Munida clinata Macpherson, 1994
- Munida collier Ahyong, 2007
- Munida coltroi de Melo-Filho and de Melo, 2006
- Munida columbae Macpherson, 2006
- Munida comorina Alcock & Anderson, 1899
- Munida compacta Macpherson, 1997
- Munida compressa Baba, 1988
- Munida congesta Macpherson, 1999
- Munida constricta A. Milne Edwards 1880
- Munida cornuta Macpherson, 1994
- Munida crassa Baba, 1982
- Munida curvimana A. Milne Edwards & Bouver, 1894
- Munida curvipes Benedict, 1902
- Munida curvirostris Henderson, 1885
- Munida debilis Benedict, 1902
- Munida declivis Baba, 1994
- Munida delicata Macpherson, 2004
- Munida descensa Macpherson, 2006
- Munida devestiva Macpherson, 2006
- Munida disgrega Baba, 2005
- Munida dispar Macpherson & Baba, 1993
- Munida dissita Macpherson, 1999
- Munida distiza Macpherson, 1994
- Munida ducoussoi Macpherson & de Saint Laurent, 1991
- Munida eclepsis Macpherson, 1994
- Munida elachia Macpherson, 1994
- Munida elfina Boone 1927
- Munida endeavourae Ahyong & Poore, 2004
- Munida erato Macpherson, 1994
- Munida erugata Macpherson, 2006
- Munida eudora Macpherson & Baba, 1993
- Munida evarne Macpherson & de Saint Laurent, 1991
- Munida evermanni Benedict 1901
- Munida exilis Ahyong, 2007
- Munida fasciata Macpherson, 2006
- Munida flinti Benedict 1902
- Munida forceps A. Milne Edwards 1880
- Munida foresti Macpherson & de Saint Laurent, 2002
- Munida fornacis Macpherson, 2006
- Munida galaxaura Macpherson, 1996
- Munida gilii Macpherson, 1993
- Munida glabella Macpherson, 2000
- Munida gordoae Macpherson, 1994
- Munida gracilipes Faxon, 1893
- Munida gracilis Henderson, 1885
- Munida gregaria Fabricius, 1793
- Munida guineae Miyake & Baba, 1970
- Munida guttata Macpherson, 1994
- Munida haswelli Henderson, 1885
- Munida heblingi de Melo-Filho and de Melo, 1994
- Munida heteracantha Ortmann, 1892
- Munida hispida Benedict, 1902
- Munida honshuensis Benedict, 1902
- Munida howensis Ahyong, 2007
- Munida hyalina Macpherson, 1994
- Munida icela Ahyong, 2007
- Munida idyia Macpherson, 1994
- Munida ignea Macpherson, 2006
- Munida inornata Henderson, 1885
- Munida insularis Macpherson, 1999
- Munida intermedia A. Milne Edwards & Bouvier, 1899
- Munida iris A. Milne Edwards, 1880
- Munida irrasa A. Milne Edwards 1880
- Munida isos Ahyong & Poore, 2004
- Munida janetae Tirmizi & Javed, 1992
- Munida japonica Stimpson, 1858
- Munida kapala Ahyong & Poore, 2004
- Munida kawamotoi Osawa & Okuno, 2002
- Munida keiensis Baba, 2005
- Munida kuboi Yanagita, 1943
- Munida laevis Macpherson & Baba, 1993
- Munida latior Baba, 2005
- Munida leagora Macpherson, 1994
- Munida lenticularis Macpherson & de Saint Laurent, 1991
- Munida leptitis Macpherson, 1994
- Munida leptosyne Macpherson, 1994
- Munida limatula Macpherson, 2004
- Munida limula Macpherson & Baba, 1993
- Munida lineola Macpherson, 1994
- Munida llenasi Macpherson, 2006
- Munida longicheles Macpherson & de Saint Laurent, 1991
- Munida maatijadakurnaaku McCallum, Ahyong & Andreakis, 2021
- Munida macrobrachia Hendrickx, 2003
- Munida magniantennulata Baba & Türkay, 1992
- Munida major Baba, 1988
- Munida masi Macpherson, 1994
- Munida masoae Macpherson, 1996
- Munida media Benedict, 1902
- Munida melite Macpherson & Baba, 1993
- Munida mexicana Benedict, 1902
- Munida microphthalma A. Milne Edwards, 1880
- Munida microps Alcock, 1894
- Munida micula Macpherson, 1996
- Munida miles A. Milne Edwards, 1880
- Munida militaris Henderson, 1885
- Munida miniata Macpherson, 1996
- Munida minuta Macpherson, 1993
- Munida moliae Macpherson, 1994
- Munida montemaris Bahamonde & López, 1962
- Munida muscae Macpherson & de Saint Laurent, 2002
- Munida nesaea Macpherson & Baba, 1993
- Munida nesiotes Macpherson, 1999
- Munida notata Macpherson, 1994
- Munida notialis Baba, 2005
- Munida nuda Benedict, 1902
- Munida obesa Faxon, 1893
- Munida oblonga Macpherson, 2006
- Munida ocellata Macpherson & de Saint Laurent, 1991
- Munida offella Macpherson, 1996
- Munida olivarae Macpherson, 1994
- Munida ommata Macpherson, 2004
- Munida oritea Macpherson & Baba, 1993
- Munida pagesi Macpherson, 1994
- Munida parca Macpherson, 1996
- Munida parile Macpherson & Machordom, 2005
- Munida parvioculata Baba, 1982
- Munida parvula Macpherson, 1993
- Munida pasithea Macpherson & de Saint Laurent, 1991
- Munida pavonis Macpherson, 2004
- Munida pectinata Macpherson & Machordom, 2005
- Munida perlata Benedict, 1902
- Munida petronioi de Melo-Filho & de Melo, 1994
- Munida pherusa Macpherson & Baba, 1993
- Munida philippinensis Macpherson & Baba, 1993
- Munida pilorhyncha Miyake & Baba, 1966
- Munida polynoe Macpherson & de Saint Laurent, 1991
- Munida pontoporea Macpherson, 1994
- Munida profunda Macpherson & de Saint Laurent, 1991
- Munida prominula Baba, 1988
- Munida propinqua Faxon, 1893
- Munida proto Macpherson, 1994
- Munida psamathe Macpherson, 1994
- Munida pseliophora Macpherson, 1994
- Munida psylla Macpherson, 1994
- Munida pubescens Dong, Gan & Li, 2021
- Munida pulchra Macpherson & de Saint Laurent, 1991
- Munida pumila Macpherson, 2004
- Munida punctata Macpherson, 1997
- Munida pusilla Benedict, 1902
- Munida pusiola Macpherson, 1993
- Munida pygmaea Macpherson, 1996
- Munida quadrispina Benedict, 1902
- Munida redacta Ahyong, 2007
- Munida refulgens Faxon, 1893
- Munida remota Baba, 1990
- Munida rhodonia Macpherson, 1994
- Munida robusta A. Milne Edwards, 1880
- Munida rogeri Macpherson, 1994
- Munida rosea Dong, Gan & Li, 2021
- Munida roshanei Tirmizi, 1966
- Munida rosula Macpherson, 1994
- Munida rubella Macpherson & de Saint Laurent, 1991
- Munida rubiesi Macpherson, 1991
- Munida rubridigitalis Baba, 1994
- Munida rubrimana Ahyong, 2007
- Munida rubrovata Macpherson & de Saint Laurent, 1991
- Munida rufiantennulata Baba, 1969
- Munida rugosa Fabricius, 1775
- Munida runcinata Macpherson, 1994
- Munida rupicola Lin & Chan, 2005
- Munida rutllanti Zariquiey Álvarez, 1952
- Munida sacksi Macpherson, 1993
- Munida sagamiensis Doflein, 1902
- Munida sanctipauli Henderson, 1885
- Munida sao Macpherson, 1994
- Munida sarsi Huus, 1935
- Munida sculpta Benedict, 1902
- Munida semoni Ortmann 1894
- Munida sentai Baba, 1986
- Munida serrata Mayo, 1972
- Munida shaula Macpherson & de Saint Laurent, 2002
- Munida simplex Benedict, 1902
- Munida simulatrix Macpherson & Machordom, 2005
- Munida sinensis Zong & Wang, 1989
- Munida speciosa von Martens, 1878
- Munida sphinx Macpherson & Baba, 1993
- Munida spicae Macpherson & de Saint Laurent, 2002
- Munida spilota Macpherson, 1994
- Munida spinicruris Ahyong & Poore, 2004
- Munida spinifrons Henderson, 1885
- Munida spinosa Henderson, 1885
- Munida spinulifera Miers, 1884
- Munida spissa Macpherson, 1996
- Munida stia Macpherson, 1994
- Munida stigmatica Macpherson, 1994
- Munida stimpsoni A. Milne Edwards, 1880
- Munida striata Chace, 1942
- Munida striola Macpherson & Baba, 1993
- Munida subcaeca Bouvier, 1922
- Munida taenia Macpherson, 1994
- Munida tangaroa Ahyong, 2007
- Munida tenella Benedict, 1902
- Munida tenuimana Sars, 1872
- Munida thoe Macpherson, 1994
- Munida tiresias Macpherson, 1994
- Munida tropicalis A. Milne Edwards & Bouvier, 1897
- Munida tuberculata Henderson, 1885
- Munida tyche Macpherson, 1994
- Munida typhle Macpherson, 1994
- Munida valida Smith, 1883
- Munida victoria de Melo-Filho, 1996
- Munida vigiliarum Alcock, 1901
- Munida volantis Macpherson, 2004
- Munida williamsi Hendrickx, 2000
- Munida zebra Macpherson, 1994
