= Danocrania =

Danocrania Temporal range: Maastrichtian–Danian

Scientific classification
- Domain: Eukaryota
- Kingdom: Animalia
- Phylum: Brachiopoda
- Class: Craniata
- Order: Craniida
- Family: Craniidae
- Genus: †Danocrania; Rozenkrantz, 1964

Species
- D. tuberculata (Nilsson, 1826) type species = Crania tuberculata, Craniolites brattenburgicus (suppressed); D. allani (Cockbain, 1967) = Westalicrania allani; D. austriaca (Traub, 1938) = Crania austriaca; D. guelhemensis (Kruytzer & Meijer, 1958) = Crania guelhemensis; D. hagenowi (Davidson, 1852) = Crania hagenowi; D. kressenbergensis (Gümbel, 1861) = Crania kressenbergensis; D. polonica Rozenkrantz, 1964; D. spinulosa (Nilsson, 1827) = Crania spinulosa

Synonyms
- Westalicrania, Cockbain, 1967

Extinct genus of brachiopods

Danocrania is an extinct genus of brachiopods from the Upper Cretaceous and Lower Paleocene of Europe and Australia. The shell is round to rounded square. The dorsal valve is covered in fine pustules or spines.
