= Munida aequalis =

Scientific classification
- Kingdom: Animalia
- Phylum: Arthropoda
- Clade: Pancrustacea
- Class: Malacostraca
- Order: Decapoda
- Suborder: Pleocyemata
- Infraorder: Anomura
- Family: Munididae
- Genus: Munida
- Species: M. aequalis

Binomial name
- Munida aequalis Ahyong & Poore, 2004

Species of crustacean

Munida aequalis is a species of squat lobster in the family Munididae. It was first described in 2004 by Shane Ahyong and GartyPoore. The species name is derived from the Latin aequalis, meaning "like" or "same", referring to the similar size of the terminal spines of the basal antennular segment. It is found northwest of Tweed Heads, New South Wales to near Wooli, New South Wales, at depths between about 150 and 550 metres (490 and 1,800 ft). The males are usually between 14.0 and 41.5 millimetres (0.55 and 1.63 in) long, with the females being between about 19.1 and 28.5 millimetres (0.75 and 1.12 in) long.
