= Munida africana =

Scientific classification
- Domain: Eukaryota
- Kingdom: Animalia
- Phylum: Arthropoda
- Class: Malacostraca
- Order: Decapoda
- Suborder: Pleocyemata
- Infraorder: Anomura
- Family: Munididae
- Genus: Munida
- Species: M. africana

Binomial name
- Munida africana Balss, 1913

Species of crustacean

Munida africana is a species of squat lobster in the family Munididae. The specific epithet refers to its distribution off Africa, where it was first found at depths of about 865 metres (2,840 ft). The males are generally around 9.5 millimetres (0.37 in) in size.
