= Munida albiapicula =

Scientific classification
- Kingdom: Animalia
- Phylum: Arthropoda
- Clade: Pancrustacea
- Class: Malacostraca
- Order: Decapoda
- Suborder: Pleocyemata
- Infraorder: Anomura
- Family: Munididae
- Genus: Munida
- Species: M. albiapicula

Binomial name
- Munida albiapicula Baba & Yu, 1987

Species of crustacean

Munida albiapicula is a species of squat lobster in the family Munididae. The specific epithet is derived from the combination of the Latin albus, meaning "white", and apiculus, meaning "tip", referring to the white tips of the supraocular spines. The males usually measure up to 20.7 millimetres (0.81 in), with the females measuring up to 16.9 millimetres (0.67 in). It is found off of the north east coast of Taiwan, at depths between about 50 and 450 metres (160 and 1,480 ft).
