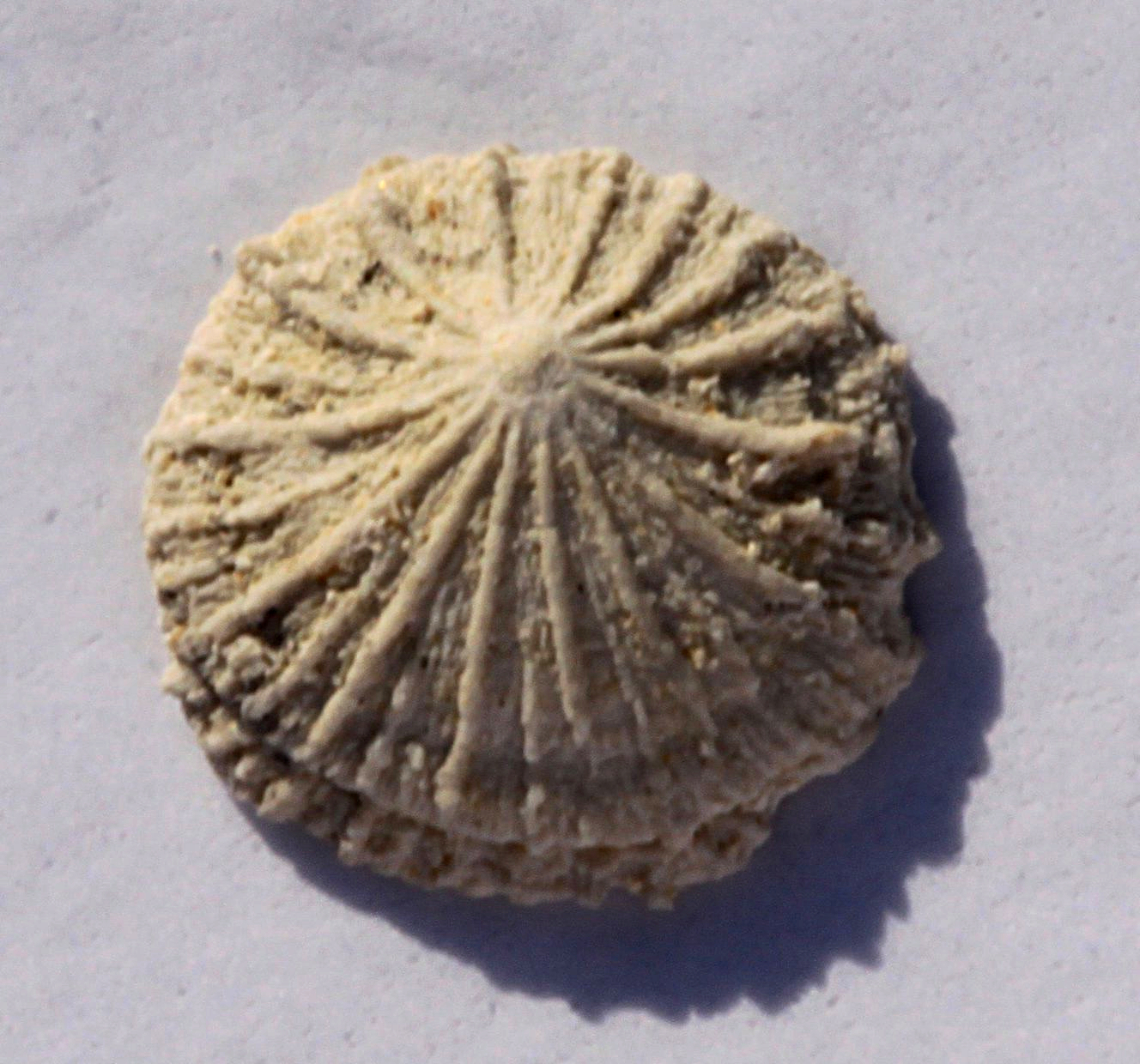
- Isocrania egnabergensis, 7 mm Ø

Scientific classification
- Kingdom: Animalia
- Phylum: Brachiopoda
- Class: Craniata
- Order: Craniida
- Family: Craniidae
- Genus: †Isocrania; Jäckel, 1902

Species
- I. egnabergensis (Retzius, 1781) type species = Crania engabergensis, regularly misspelled as ignabergensis; I. barbata (Von Hagenow, 1842) = Crania barbata; I. borealis Ernst, 1984; I. campaniensis Ernst, 1984; I. costata (J. Sowerby, 1823) = Crania costata; I. paucicostata (Bosquet, 1859) = Crania paucicostata; I. phosphatica Simon, 1998; I. praecostata Ernst, 1984; I. restricta Ernst, 1984; I. sendeni Simon, 2007

= Isocrania =

Isocrania Temporal range: Turonian–Danian

Extinct genus of brachiopods

Isocrania is an extinct genus of brachiopods found during the Upper Cretaceous. Early representatives were attached to the underground, but later species are presumed to be free living at an increasingly earlier age. This was probably an adaptation to the increasing very thick and fine sedimentation during the latest Cretaceous.

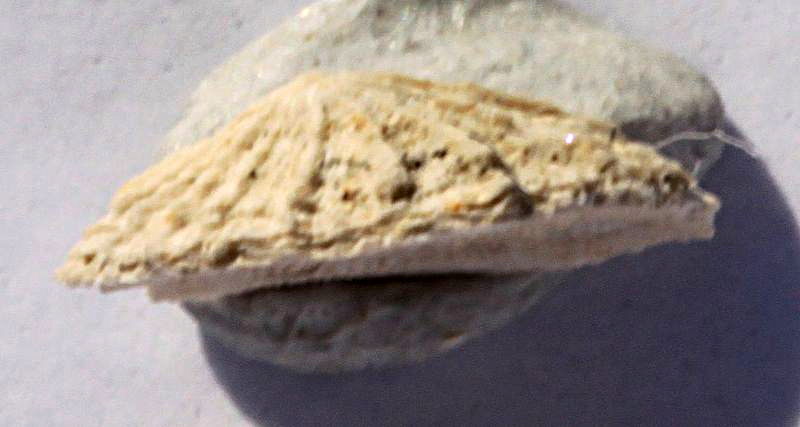
Isocrania egnabergensis, lateral view

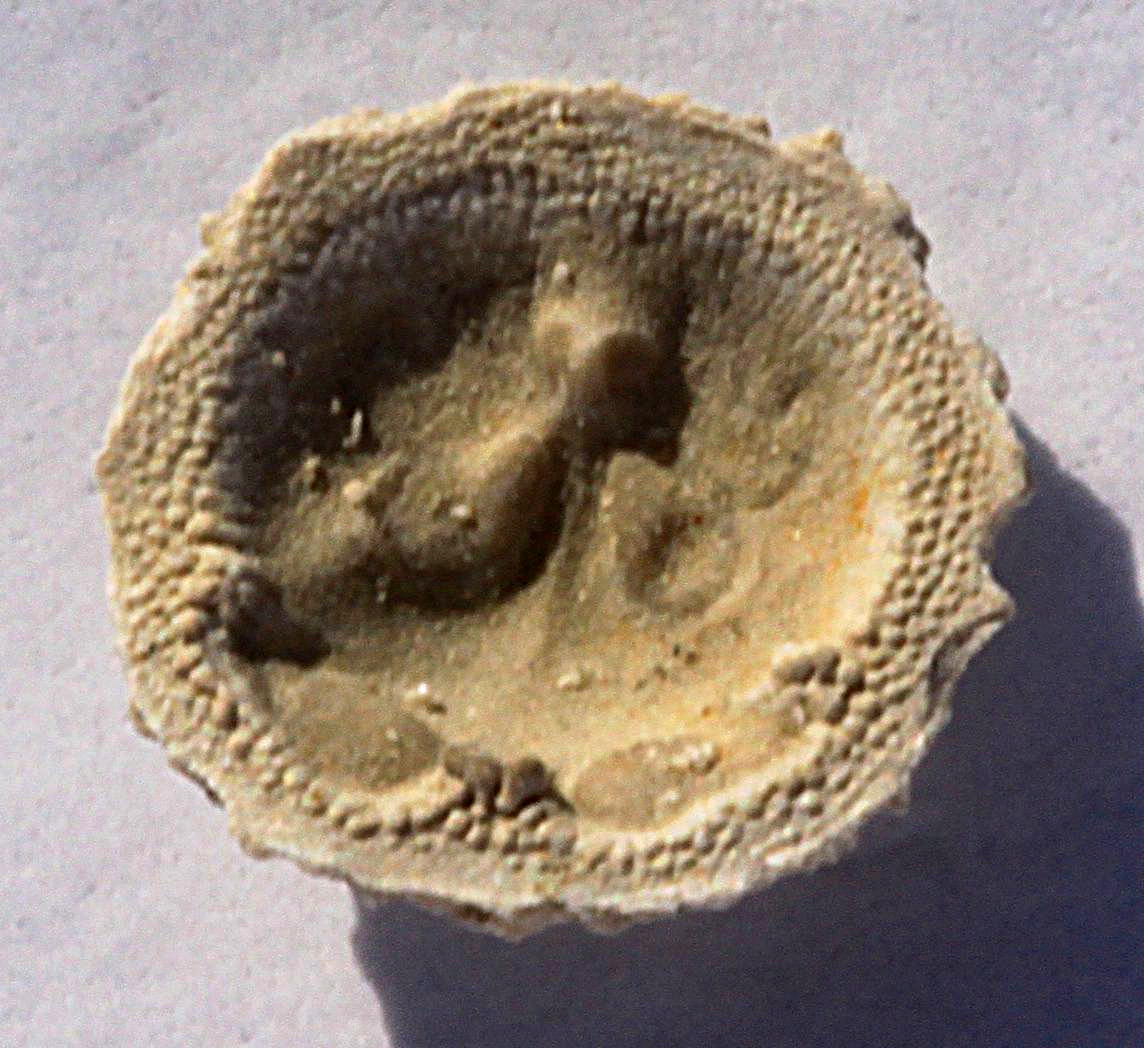
internal

== Description ==
Isocrania is round to ovate, up to 1 cm in diameter, and has 15-65 strong ribs, that start at ±½mm from the origin of growth (or umbo). These ribs may extend beyond the edge of the valves. The umbo is not precisely in the centre of the valve. The attachment area is smaller than usual, and virtually absent in adults of later species. The dorsal valve is conical, the ventral valve flat to conical, flatter for adolescents and earlier species. The inner edge of the valves is flattened and grainy.

== Species and distribution ==
- I. campaniensis is known from the Upper Cretaceous of Belgium (Upper Campanian, Craibel Quarry, Obourg, Craie d'Obourg and Craie de Trivieres Formations, 50.4° N, 3.9° E).
- I. costata has been found in the Upper Cretaceous of France (Lower Campanian, d'Avezac Formation, Tercis, 43.7° N, 1.1° W; and Upper Campanian, Tercis, Les Vignes Formation), Denmark (Maastrichtian, Nye Klov 3-7, 55.5° N, 12.5° E) and the Lower Paleogene of Denmark (Lower Danian, Nye Klov 8, 9 and 20-28, 55.5° N, 12.5° E). This species occurs in sediments from quiet, deep, off-shore waters, which is consistent with the fact that the preservation state is excellent and many specimens have boring holes testifying that they were predated by molluscs.

== See also ==
- List of brachiopod genera
