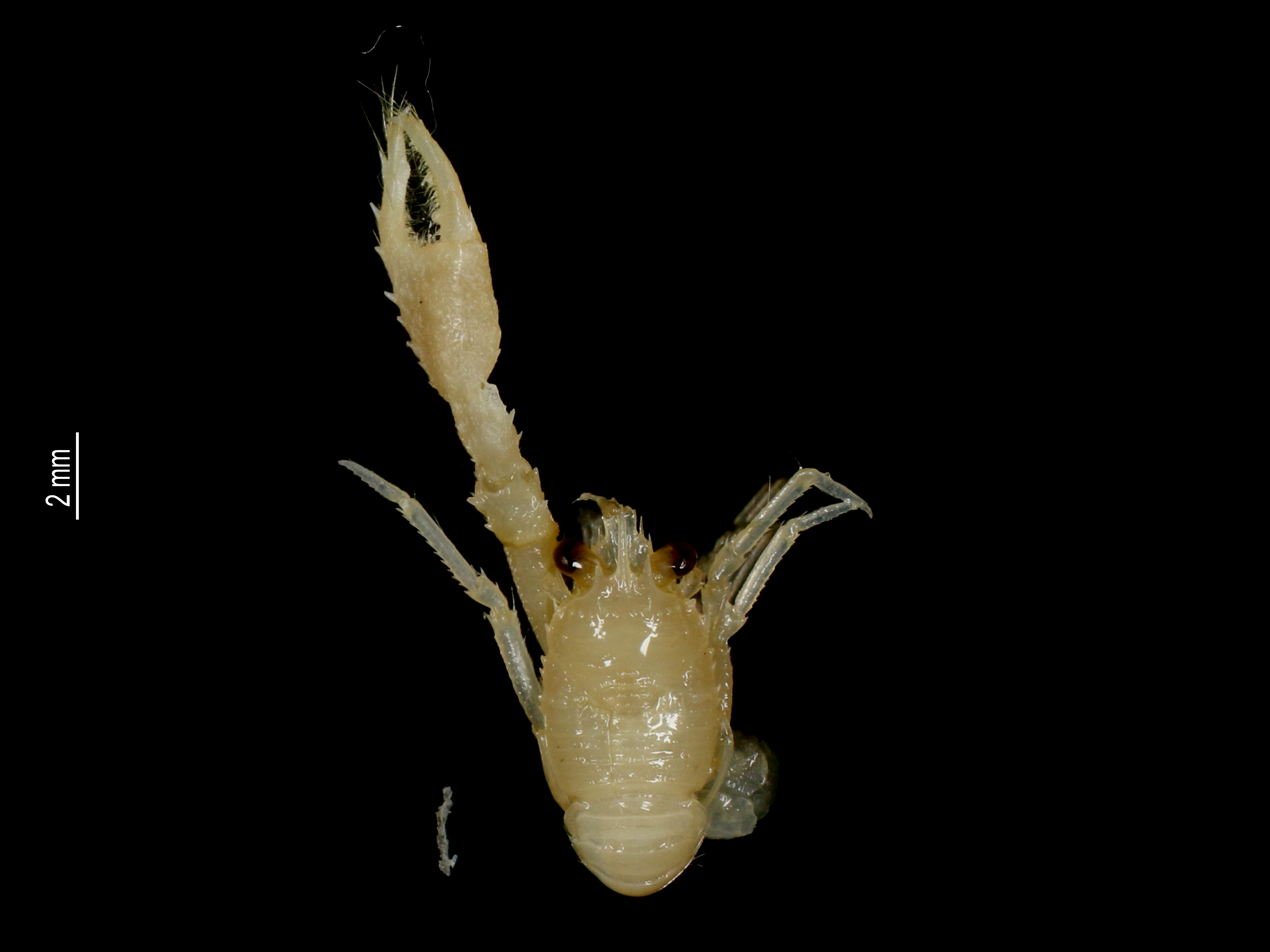
- Munida acola Macpherson, c.2009

Scientific classification
- Kingdom: Animalia
- Phylum: Arthropoda
- Class: Malacostraca
- Order: Decapoda
- Suborder: Pleocyemata
- Infraorder: Anomura
- Family: Munididae
- Genus: Munida
- Species: M. acola

Binomial name
- Munida acola Macpherson, 2009

= Munida acola =

Species of crustacean

Munida acola is a species of squat lobster in the family Munididae. The species name is derived from the Greek akolos, meaning "bit", referring to its small size. It is found off of the Loyalty Islands, at depths between about 4 and 30 metres (13 and 98 ft). The males are usually between 3.0 and 4.1 millimetres (0.12 and 0.16 in) long, with the females being between about 2.8 and 3.1 millimetres (0.11 and 0.12 in) long.
