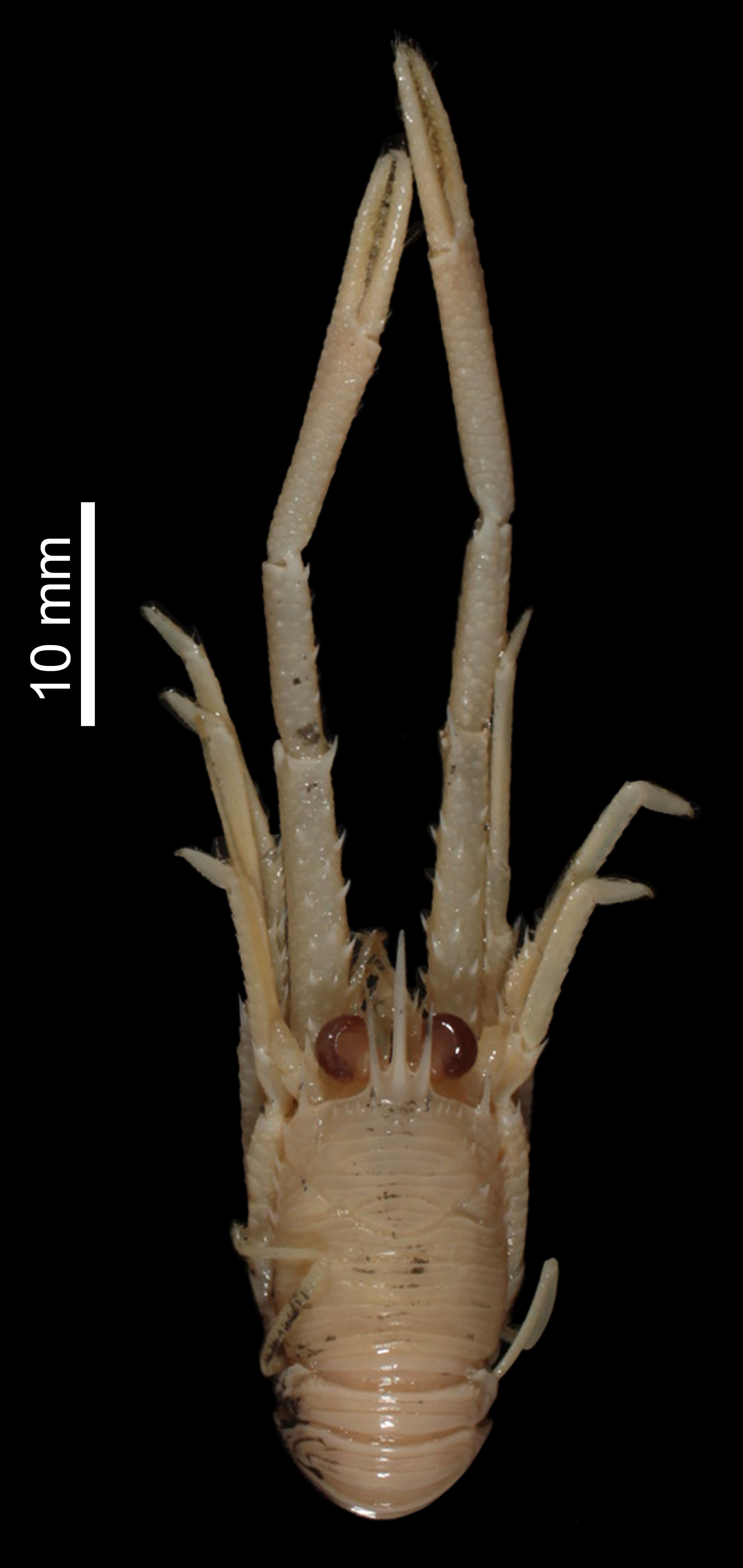

Scientific classification
- Kingdom: Animalia
- Phylum: Arthropoda
- Class: Malacostraca
- Order: Decapoda
- Suborder: Pleocyemata
- Infraorder: Anomura
- Family: Munididae
- Genus: Munida
- Species: M. acantha

Binomial name
- Munida acantha Macpherson, 1994

= Munida acantha =

Species of crustacean

Munida acantha is a species of squat lobster in the family Munididae. The species name is derived from the Greek acantha, meaning "spine", referring to the long distomesial spine on the base antennal segment. It is found near Atoll de la Surprise, and off New Caledonia and the Loyalty Islands, at depths between about 60 and 460 metres (200 and 1,510 ft). The males are usually between 5.8 and 12.6 millimetres (0.23 and 0.50 in) long, with the females being between about 4.5 and 11.4 millimetres (0.18 and 0.45 in) long.
