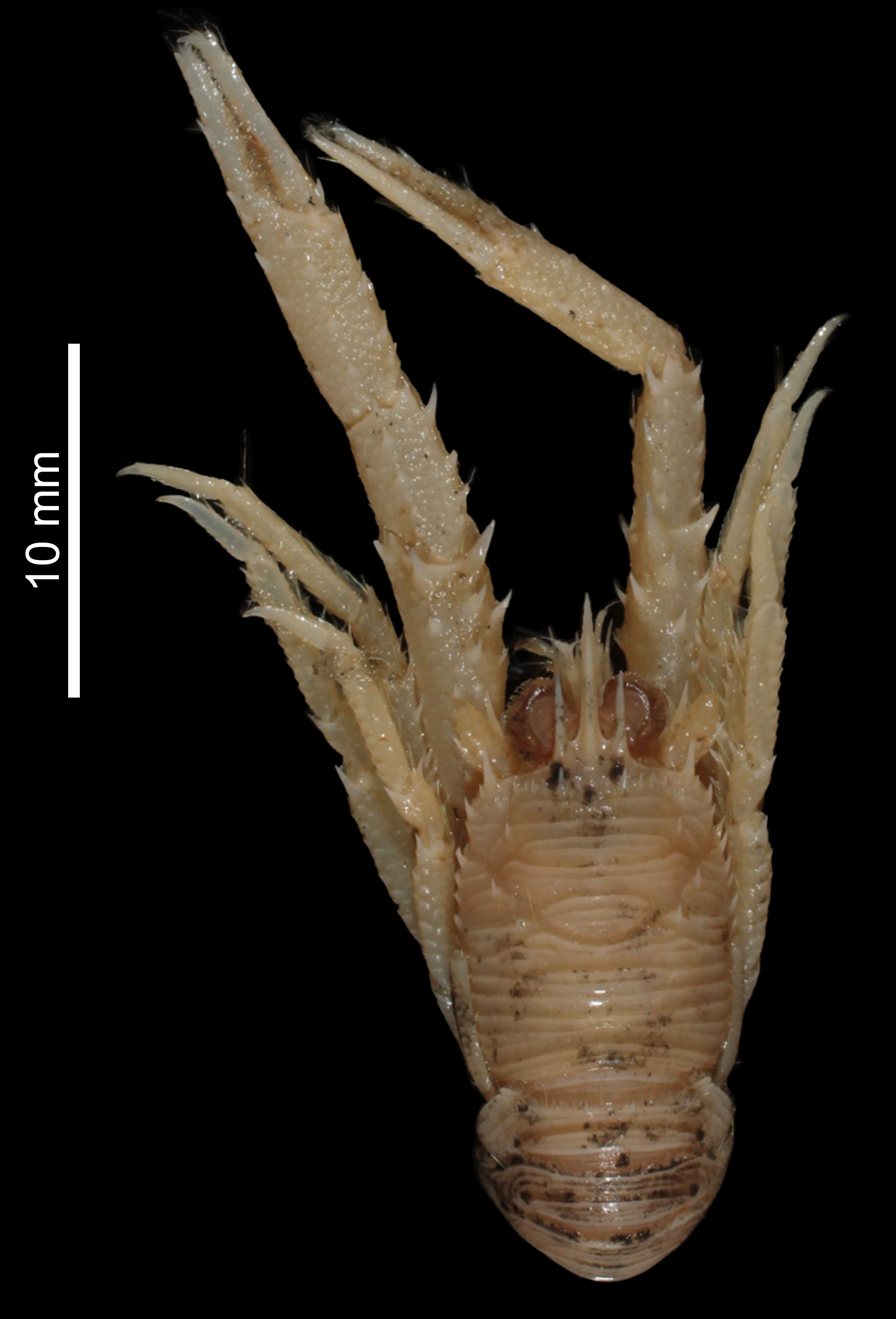

Scientific classification
- Kingdom: Animalia
- Phylum: Arthropoda
- Clade: Pancrustacea
- Class: Malacostraca
- Order: Decapoda
- Suborder: Pleocyemata
- Infraorder: Anomura
- Family: Munididae
- Genus: Munida
- Species: M. agave

Binomial name
- Munida agave Macpherson & Baba, 1993

= Munida agave =

Species of crustacean

Munida agave is a species of squat lobster in the family Munididae. The specific epithet is derived from the name of one of Greek nereids, Agave. The males usually measure between 4.9 and 12.7 millimetres (0.19 and 0.50 in), with the females measuring between 3.7 and 9.7 millimetres (0.15 and 0.38 in). It is found off of Indonesia, the Philippines, Taiwan, and Japan, at depths between about 90 and 550 metres (300 and 1,800 ft).
