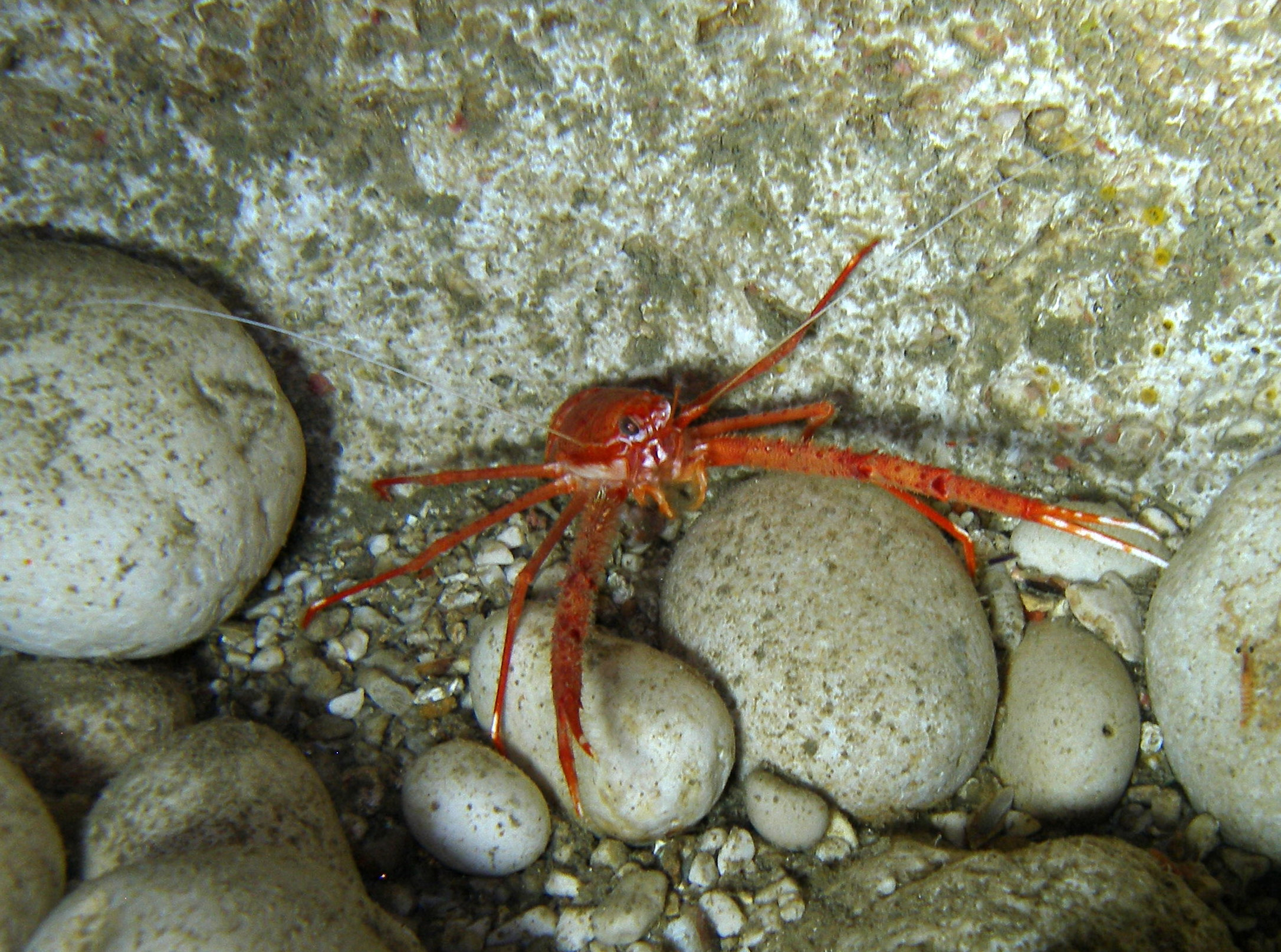

Scientific classification
- Domain: Eukaryota
- Kingdom: Animalia
- Phylum: Arthropoda
- Class: Malacostraca
- Order: Decapoda
- Suborder: Pleocyemata
- Infraorder: Anomura
- Family: Munididae
- Genus: Munida
- Species: M. rugosa

Binomial name
- Munida rugosa (Fabricius, 1775)

Synonyms
- Astacus bamffius Pennant, 1777; Cancer bamfficus; Cancer rugosus (Fabricius, 1775); Galathea bamfia; Galathea longipeda Lamarck, 1801; Galathea rugosa (Fabricius, 1775); Munida bamffia (Pennant, 1777); Munida bamffica (Pennant, 1777); Munida bamffica var. rugosa; Munida bamfica; Munida banffica; Munida rondeletii Bell, 1846; Pagurus rugosus Fabricius, 1775

= Munida rugosa =

Species of crustacean

Munida rugosa, commonly known as the rugose squat lobster or plated lobster, is a species of decapod crustacean found in the north east Atlantic Ocean and the Mediterranean Sea.

== Taxonomy ==
There has been confusion over the nomenclature of certain members of the genus Munida for some time but in 1986, A. L. Rice and Michèle de Saint Laurent examined the literature and specimens in collections and determined that there were four species involved. They determined that the correct names were Munida rugosa (Fabricius, 1775), M. tenuimana G. O. Sars, 1872, M. intermedia A. Milne Edwards & Bouvier, 1899, and M. sarsi Huus, 1935. The first three species occur in both the Atlantic Ocean and the Mediterranean Sea while M. sarsi is found only in the Atlantic. The name M. bamffia was used extensively in the 19th century and early 20th century but it seems to have been used for two species, M. intermedia and M. rugosa. The specific epithet "bamffius" was itself an error as Thomas Pennant was naming his newly described species after the town of Banff in Scotland near where his specimen was found.

== Description ==
Munida rugosa is orange with transverse bands of darker colour on the carapace and abdomen. It is up to 10 centimetres (3.9 in) long but like other members of the genus, it folds its abdomen beneath its cephalothorax. The carapace including the rostrum is about 30 millimetres (1.2 in) long. The carapace has a few spines on the back edge and the rostrum has a single central spine, flanked by two shorter spines above the eyes. The thread-like antennae are slightly shorter than the first pair of appendages which are tipped by long narrow white pincers. The next three pairs of limbs also have white tips and are used for walking. The fifth pair is particularly thin and is usually held underneath the margins of the carapace. The eyes are relatively small in this species and the morphology varies over its range. More southerly specimens are more spiny, have more setae on the abdomen and have longer, more slender limbs.

== Distribution ==
Munida rugosa is found in the western Mediterranean Sea, around Madeira, in the north eastern Atlantic Ocean, in the North Sea and adjacent continental waters north of 25°N. at depths of up to 150 metres (490 ft), typically in cracks or under boulders.

== Biology ==
Gametogenesis is followed by spawning, larval release and larval settling. The eggs are carried in the female's brood patch and the larvae are released at the most favourable season for their survival when there is the most particulate food available. In a study of M. rugosa from the west of Scotland, it was found that 86% of the females carrying embryos had mated with more than one male.

It has been found that some larger males exhibit sexual dimorphism in that their claws become arched rather than being straight. This seems to be a form of sexual selection and it may be that such chela are more able to inflict puncture wounds when males are interacting in competition for females.
