= Ancistrocrania =

Ancistrocrania Temporal range: Senonian–Maastrichtian

Scientific classification
- Domain: Eukaryota
- Kingdom: Animalia
- Phylum: Brachiopoda
- Class: Craniata
- Order: Craniida
- Family: Craniidae
- Genus: †Ancistrocrania; Dall, 1877

Species
- A. parisiensis (Defrance, 1818) type species = Crania parisiensis; A. abnormis (Defrance, 1818) = Crania abnormis; A. bredai (Bosquet, 1854) = Crania bredai; A. bromelli (Lundgren, 1885) = Crania bromelli; A. comosa (Bosquet, 1854) = Crania comosa; A. davidsoni (Davidson, 1856) = Crania davidsoni; A. hesperius (Cooper, 1955) = Craniscus hesperius; A. mülleri (Bosquet, 1859) = Crania mülleri; A. nodulosa (Höninghaus, 1828) = Crania nodulosa; A. quadrangularis (Lundgren, 1885) = Crania quadrangularis; A. retzii (Lundgren, 1885) = Crania retzii; A. stobaei (Lundgren, 1885) = Crania stobaei; A. suessi (Bosquet, 1859) = Crania suessi

Synonyms
- Craniopsis, Dall, 1871 non Craniopsis Adams, 1860, a keyholelimpet

Extinct genus of brachiopods

Ancistrocrania is an extinct genus of brachiopods from the Upper Cretaceous of Europe and North-America. The name is derived from the Greek words αγκιστρο (agkistro) "fish hook" and κρανίον (kranion) skull.
