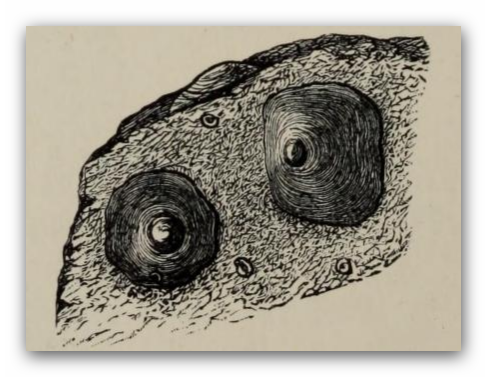
- Three specimens of Novocrania anomala on a stone

Scientific classification
- Kingdom: Animalia
- Phylum: Brachiopoda
- Class: Craniata
- Order: Craniida
- Family: Craniidae
- Genus: Novocrania; Lee & Brunton, 2001

Species
- Novocrania anomala (Müller, 1776) (type species) = Crania anomala, Neocrania anomala, Crania rostrata, Neocrania rostrata, Novocrania rostrata, Crania turbinata, Neocrania turbinata, Novocrania turbinata; Novocrania altivertex (Zezina, 1990) = Crania altivertex; Novocrania californica (Berry, 1921) = Crania californica; Novocrania chathamensis (Allan, 1940) = Crania chathamensis; Novocrania hawaiiensis (Dall, 1920) = Crania hawaiiensis; Novocrania huttoni (Thomson, 1916) = Crania huttoni; Novocrania indonesiensis (Zezina, 1981) = Crania indonesiensis; Novocrania japonica (Adams, 1863) = Crania japonica, C. reevei, N. reevei; Novocrania lecointei (Joubin, 1901) = Crania; Novocrania nysti (Davidson, 1874) = Crania nysti; Novocrania philippinensis (Dall, 1920) = Crania philippinensis; Novocrania pourtalesi (Dall, 1871) = Crania pourtalesi; Novocrania roseoradiata (Jackson, 1952) = Crania roseoradiata; Novocrania valdiviae (Helmcke, 1940) = Crania valdiviae

Synonyms
- Neocrania Lee & Brunton, 1986 non Neocrania Davis, 1978, a moth

= Novocrania =

Genus of brachiopods

Novocrania is a genus of brachiopods found off shore.

Species taxonomy was reviewed by Jeffrey H. Robinson.
