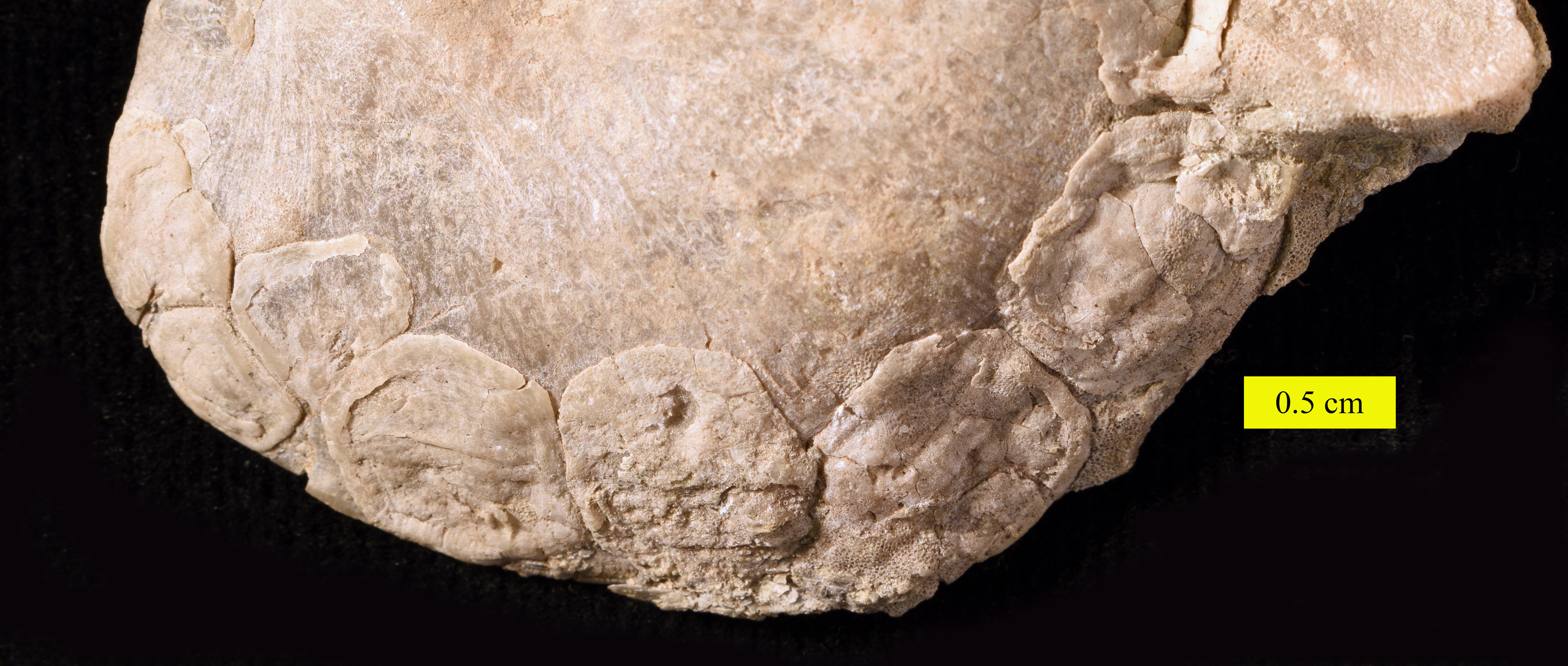
- Petrocrania scabiosa encrusting the edge of a strophomenide brachiopod; Upper Ordovician of northern Kentucky.

Scientific classification
- Kingdom: Animalia
- Phylum: Brachiopoda
- Class: Craniata
- Order: Craniida; Waagen, 1885
- Suborder: Craniidina; Waagen, 1885
- Superfamily: Cranioidea; Menke, 1828
- Family: Craniidae; Menke, 1828

Genera
- See text

Synonyms
- Valdiviathyrididae

= Craniidae =

Craniidae Temporal range: Ordovician–Recent

Family of shelled animals

The Craniidae are a family of brachiopods, the only surviving members of the subphylum Craniiformea. They are the only members of the order Craniida, the monotypic suborder Craniidina, and the superfamily Cranioidea; consequently, the latter two taxa are at present redundant and rarely used. There are three living genera within Craniidae: Neoancistrocrania, Novocrania, and Valdiviathyris. As adults, craniids either live freely on the ocean floor or, more commonly, cement themselves onto a hard object with all or part of the ventral valve.

Like the burrowing lingulids, Craniids are inarticulate brachiopods. There are no outgrowths forming a hinge between both valves, nor is there any support for the lophophore. Unlike lingulids, which have shells consisting of apatite and organic material, craniids have shells composed mainly of calcium carbonate. No craniids are known to bear a pedicle at any development stage.

== Evolution ==
=== Extinct craniids ===
Most craniid genera are extinct, known only from fossils like other craniiforms. Craniids first appeared in the later part of the Tremadocian, the first stage of the Lower Ordovician. In the Lower Ordovician, they were mostly restricted to peri-Gondwanan terranes (modern central Europe) in the South Polar region. By the Middle Ordovician, they had spread northwards to Baltica. In the Late Ordovician, their range expanded eastwards to Avalonia before crossing the Iapetus Ocean to Laurentia.

Craniid diversity and abundance was respectable but still fairly low during the Late Ordovician, and even lower through the rest of the Paleozoic. The craniid fossil record is patchy, with fossils unknown from the Upper Carboniferous, Upper Permian, and the entire Triassic. They reappear in the Oxfordian stage of the Late Jurassic and briefly regain their Ordovician level of diversity in the Late Cretaceous.

=== Living craniids ===
Craniids are remarkable for their slow rate of evolution. Approximately 11 species of this 480-million-year-old lineage still survive today, with minimal differences relative to their fossil counterparts. One species, Valdiviathyris quenstedti, has remained essentially unchanged for the last 35 million years or so. Although some evolution would have taken place in the meantime, this was essentially silent mutations and marginal adaptations to cooler habitat. Present-day Valdiviathyris are indistinguishable from fossils of the Late Eocene, and the genus cannot even be divided into chronospecies. V. quenstedti can be considered a living fossil and one of the oldest and most long-lived species known to science.

Valdiviathyris and Neoancistrocrania have occasionally been separated into their own family, Valdiviathyrididae, though few authors follow this suggestion. Craniscus has sometimes been cited as a fourth living craniid genus, based on "Craniscus japonica", a putative species from waters off Japan. Genetic evidence has clarified this misconception, revealing that "Craniscus japonica" actually represents a misattributed species of Neoancistrocrania.

== Life history ==
Up until the Jurassic, all craniids had planktotrophic larvae possessing a larval shell. In the Late Jurassic, the first craniids with leicithotrophic larvae evolved. Craniids with planktotrophic larvae persisted until the Cenozoic, however.

== List of genera ==
From the Treatise on Invertebrate Paleontology Part H, Revised (unless stated otherwise):

- †Acanthocrania Williams, 1943 [Upper Ordovician ("Caradoc") – Lower Carboniferous]
- †Ancistrocrania Dall, 1877 = Cranopsis [Upper Cretaceous (Coniacian) – Paleocene (Danian?)]
- †Celidocrania Liu, Xhy, & Xue, 1985 [Middle Ordovician] (possible synonym of Acanthocrania)
- †Crania Retzius, 1781 [Upper Cretaceous (Campanian – Maastrichtian)]
- †Craniscus Dall, 1871 [Upper Jurassic (Oxfordian)]
- †Conocrania Smirnova, 1996 [Lower Cretaceous (Berriasian – Valanginian)]
- †Danocrania Rozenkrantz, 1964 [Upper Cretaceous (Maastrichtian) – Paleocene (Danian?)]
- †Deliella Halamski, 2004 [Lower Devonian (Emsian) – Middle Devonian (Givetian)]
- †Isocrania Jäkel, 1902 [Upper Cretaceous (Campanian) – Paleocene (Danian?)]
- †Lepidocrania Cooper and Grant, 1974 [Lower Permian]
- †Mesocrania Smirnova, 1997 [Upper Jurassic (Oxfordian) – Lower Cretaceous (Berriasian)]
- †Nematocrania Grant, 1976 [Lower Permian (Artinskian)]
- Neoancistrocrania Laurin, 1992
- Novocrania Lee and Bruton, 2001 = Neocrania
- †Orthisocrania Rowell, 1963 [Ordovician]
- †Petrocrania Raymond, 1911 [Lower Ordovician (Tremadocian) – Lower Carboniferous]
- †Philhedra Koken, 1889 [Ordovician]
- †Pseudocrania McCoy, 1851 [Lower Ordovician ("Arenig")]
- Valdiviathyris Helmcke, 1940

== Gallery ==
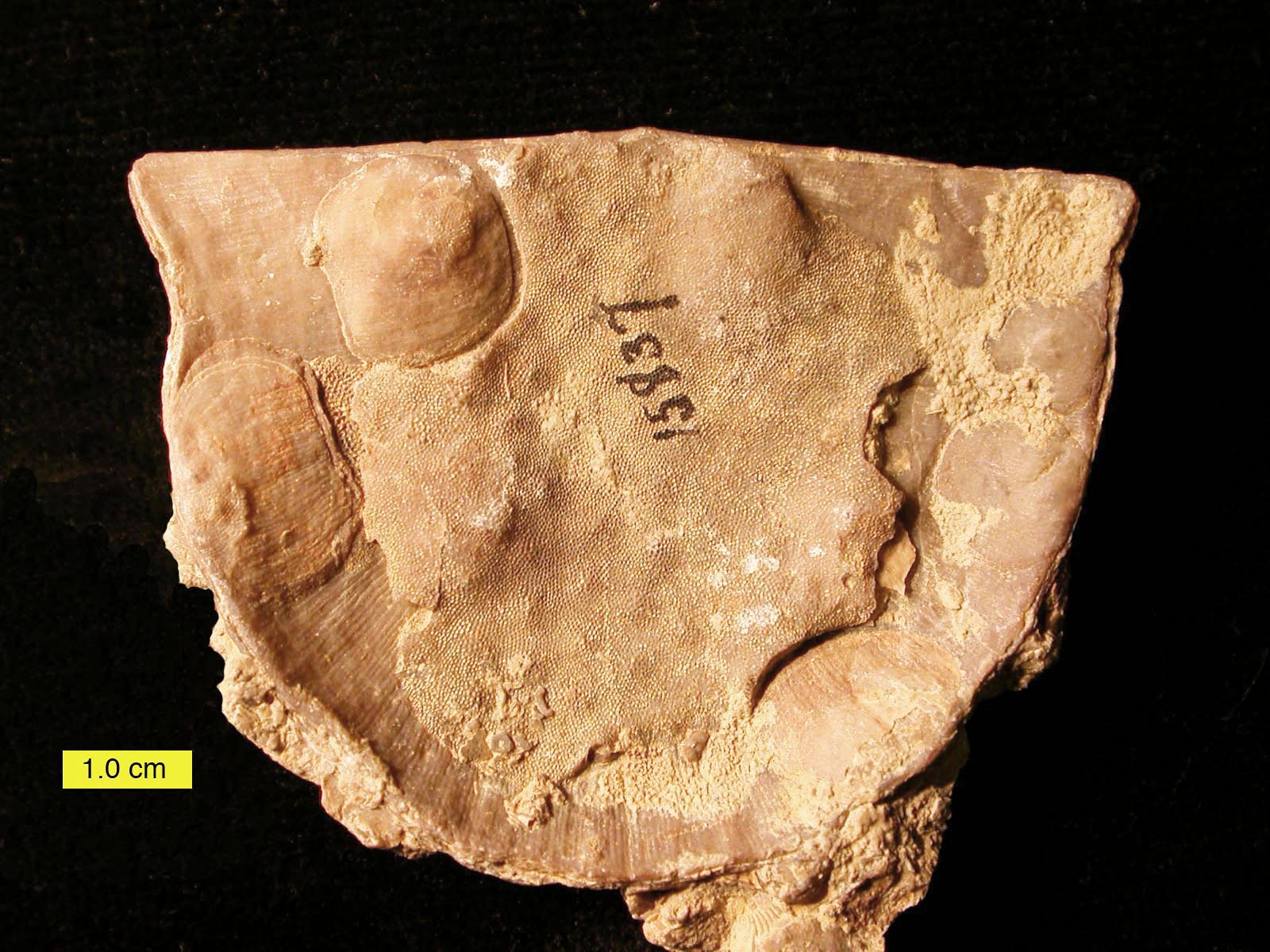
Petrocrania (small rounded shells) encrusting an Ordovician strophomenide brachiopod

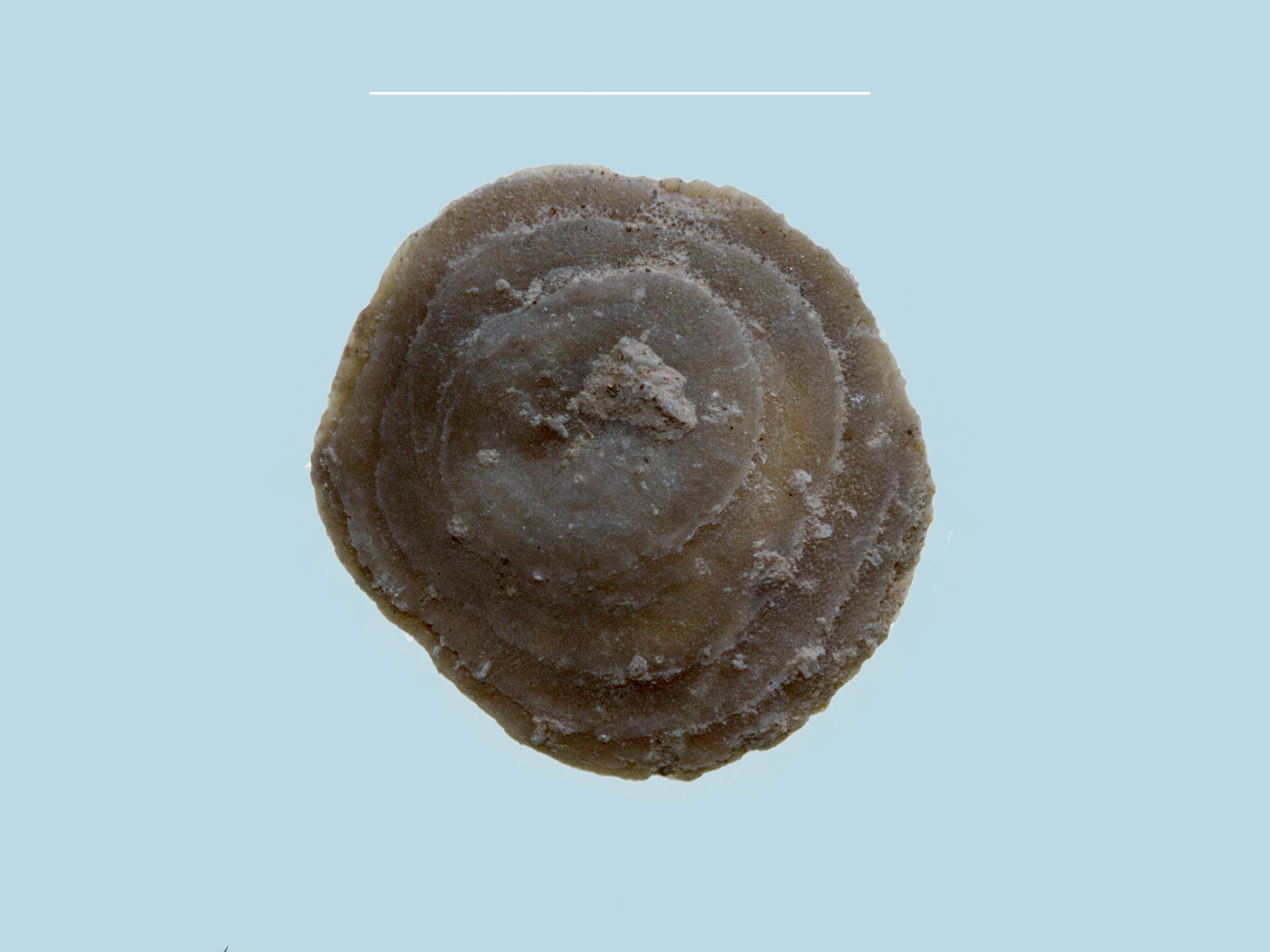
Pseudocrania sp., from the Ordovician of Estonia

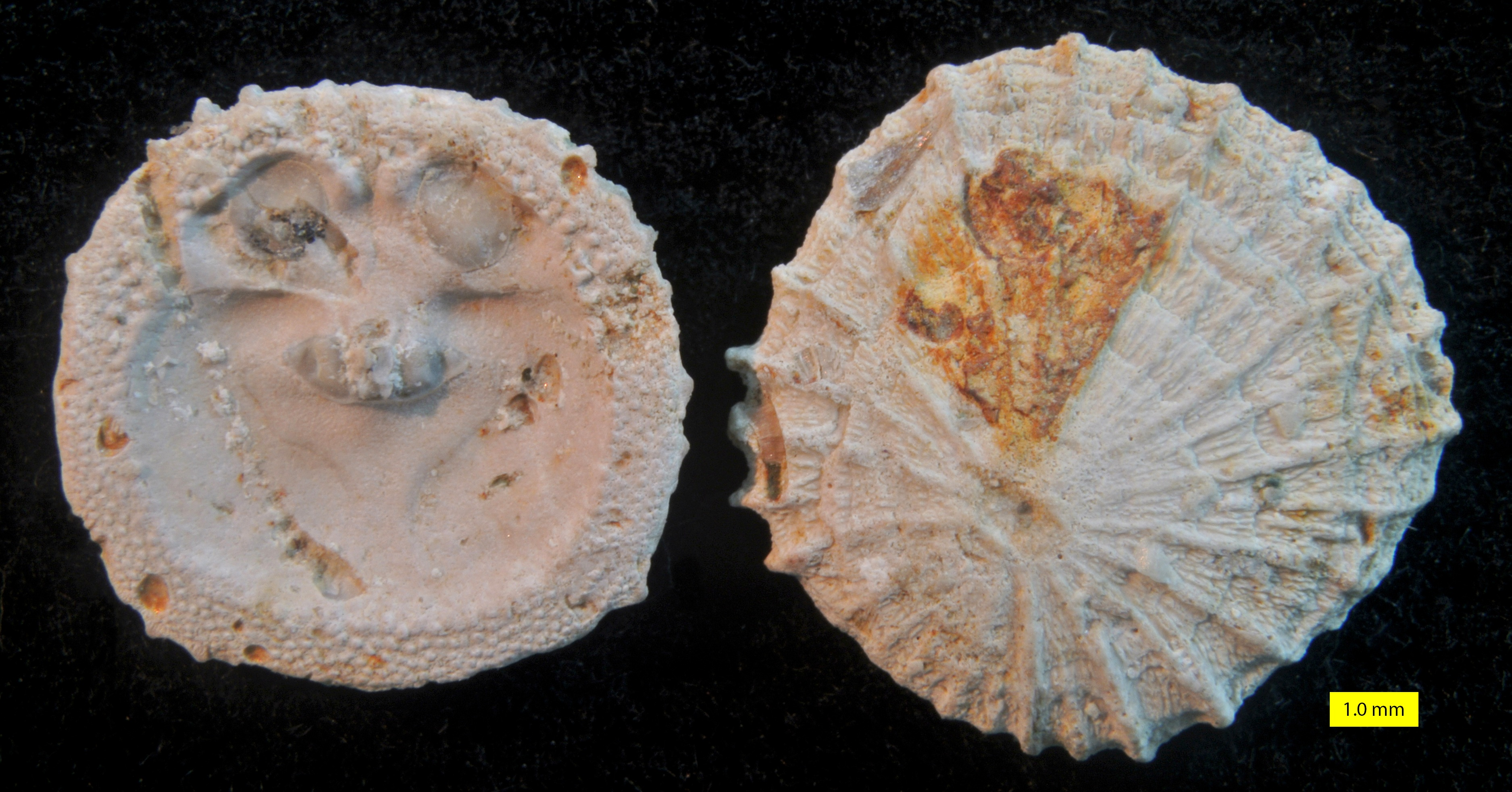
Isocrania costata, from the Upper Cretaceous of The Netherlands

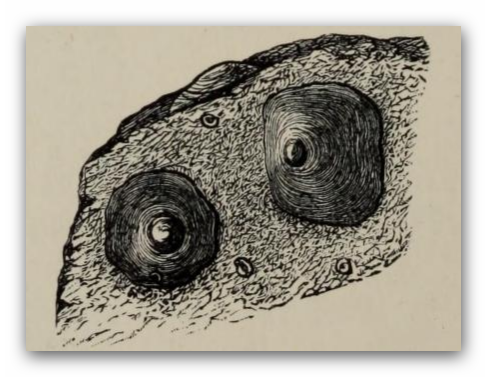
Illustration of Novocrania anomala, a living craniid native to the North Atlantic
