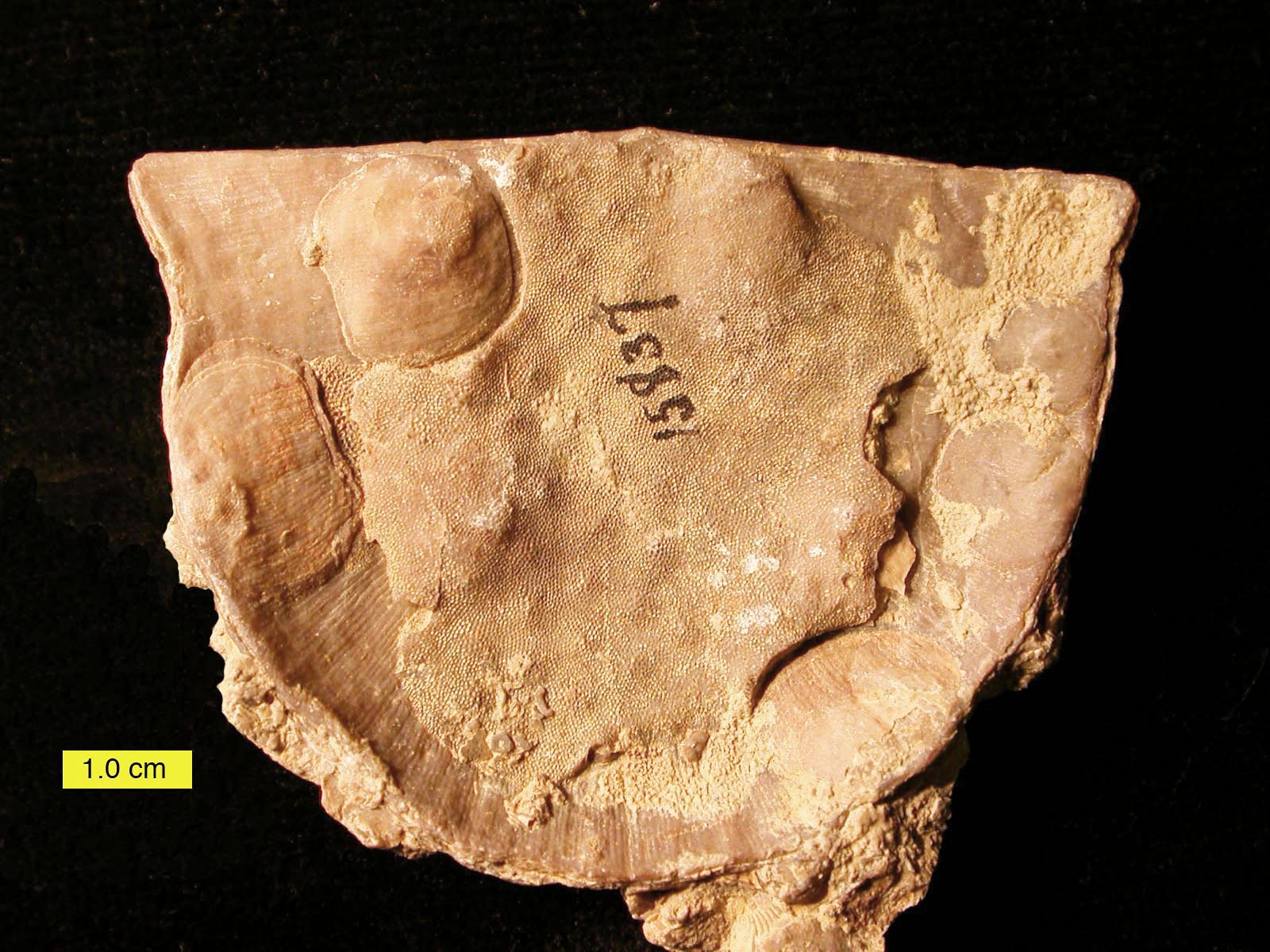
- Ordovician strophomenid brachiopod with encrusting craniid brachiopods (Philhedra, the round attached shells).

Scientific classification
- Domain: Eukaryota
- Kingdom: Animalia
- Phylum: Brachiopoda
- Subphylum: Craniiformea; Popov, Basset, Holmer & Laurie, 1993
- Class: Craniata; Williams, Carlson, Brunton, Holmer & Popov, 1996 (non Linnaeus 1758: preoccupied)

Orders
- Craniida; †Craniopsida; †Trimerellida

Synonyms
- (Class) Craniforma

= Craniata (brachiopod) =

Craniata Temporal range: Middle Cambrian– Recent

Class of marine lamp shells

Craniata is a class of brachiopods originating in the Cambrian period and still extant today. It is the only class within the subphylum Craniiformea, one of three major subphyla of brachiopods alongside linguliforms and rhynchonelliforms. Craniata is divided into three orders: the extinct Craniopsida and Trimerellida, and the living Craniida, which provides most information on their biology. Living members of the class have shells which are composed of calcite, though some extinct forms my have aragonite shells. The shells are inarticulate (lack a hinge with distinct tooth-and-socket connections) and are usually rounded in outline. There is no pedicle; the rear edge of the body cavity is a smooth and flat wall perforated by the anus. This class of brachiopods has an unsupported lophophore with only a single row of tentacles. In the absence of a pedicle, the shell is usually attached directly to a hard substrate. Many craniiforms are encrusting animals which attach directly to the shell of another animal, usually another brachiopod. The plicae from the host brachiopod will then appear within the shell of the craniiform.

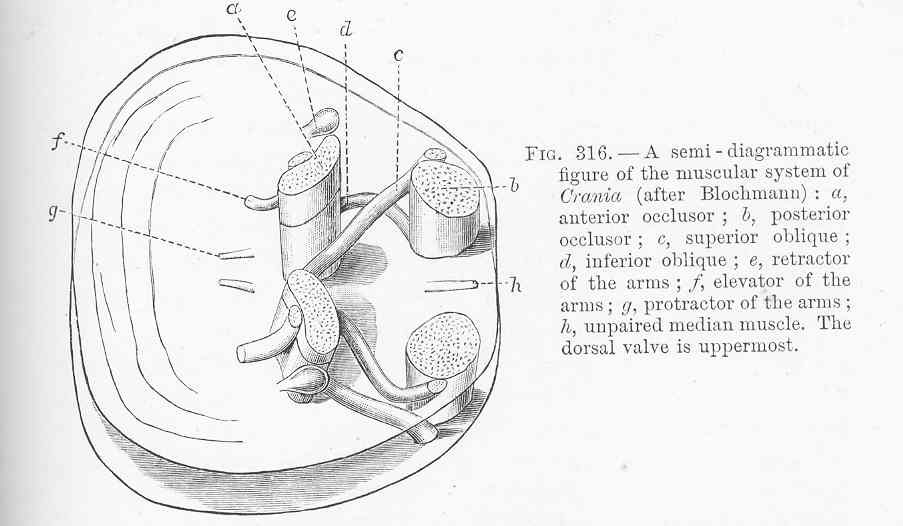
Muscular diagram for Crania, showing column-like "occlusor" (adductor) muscles and narrower oblique muscles, along with other minor muscles.

Living craniiforms have a distinctive muscle system, which can be reconstructed from muscle scars in extinct forms as well. There are two pairs of column-like adductor muscles, which extend vertically and function to close the shell. There are also two pairs of oblique muscles, which lie at a shallow angle and help to slide and rotate the valves against each other. The internal oblique muscles are closely spaced, extending up and back from the middle of the ventral valve to the back of the dorsal valve. The lateral oblique muscles are widely spaced, extending forwards from the back of the ventral shell to the front of the soft body wall.

Craniiforms share some similarities with both linguliforms and rhynchonelliforms, though they are distinct from either group. Like linguliforms, they have an anus, inarticulate shells, and a muscle system mainly based on adductor and oblique muscles. Like rhynchonelliforms, they have a calcareous shell and a modified lophophore.
